= National Administrative Council =

Executive council of the Independent Labour Party

The National Administrative Council (NAC) was the executive council of the Independent Labour Party (ILP), a British socialist party which was active from 1893 until 1975.

== Creation ==
The Independent Labour Party (ILP) was founded at a conference in Bradford in 1893 by a large number of localised organisations. Delegates wished there to be a body which would implement policy between conferences, and also raise funds, and select candidates for Parliamentary elections. However, the local organisations did not wish the new body to have too much power, requiring it not to initiate any policy which had not been approved by a conference, and to emphasise this subordinate nature, it was decided to name it the "National Administrative Council", rather than "Executive Committee".

The first NAC was elected on a regional basis, with five seats for the Northern Counties, four for London, three for Scotland, and three for the Midland Counties. The membership was:

Northern Counties	London	Scotland	Midland, Eastern and Wales
William Henry Drew; James C. Kennedy; William Johnson; John Lister; Alf Settle	Edward Aveling; Joseph Burgess; Pete Curran; Katherine St John Conway	George Carson; Chisholm Robertson; William Small	J. W. Buttery; Jordie Christie; Arthur Field

There were many candidates from the North and Scotland to choose from, but the London candidates were better known for their national activity than their local work, and there was a lack of suitable candidate from the Midlands. It was decided that there would be no chair, and the NAC would meet at locations around the country. However, a lack of funds led to it meeting only twice: in Manchester in March, and Halifax in November. However, it succeeded in agreeing to distance the organisation from Henry Hyde Champion, and it selected seven candidates for the next UK general election.

== 1894 to 1906 ==
The second conference of the ILP, held in Manchester in 1894, started with the reading of the minutes of the NAC meetings. The organisation decided to only permit ILP branches to send delegates, and this less individualised membership agreed to reduce the NAC to nine members. Three would be elected as president, treasurer and general secretary, while the other six would be elected by all delegates, using plurality-at-large voting. Only three members retained their seats, and Keir Hardie was elected, establishing his dominance within the party. The NAC now met more frequently, and had a greater role in determining policy.

The title of president was changed to chairman in 1896, and by 1898, the membership of the NAC had begun to settle down, with Hardie joined by Ramsay Macdonald, Bruce Glasier and Philip Snowden, and the "Big Four" held the leading roles in the party for many years.

Year	Chair	Treasurer	Member	Member	Member	Member	Member	Member	General Secretary
1894	Keir Hardie	John Lister	Fred Brocklehurst	Jordie Christie	Pete Curran	Leonard Hall	James Tattersall	Ben Tillett	Tom Mann
1895	Keir Hardie	John Lister	Richard Pankhurst	Jordie Christie	Pete Curran	Russell Smart	James Tattersall	Enid Stacy	Tom Mann
1896	Keir Hardie	France Littlewood	Richard Pankhurst	Fred Brocklehurst	Pete Curran	Russell Smart	Ramsay MacDonald	Enid Stacy	Tom Mann
1897	Keir Hardie	France Littlewood	Bruce Glasier	Tom Shaw	Pete Curran	Russell Smart	Ramsay MacDonald	Florence Harrison-Bell	Tom Mann
1898	Keir Hardie	France Littlewood	Bruce Glasier	Fred Brocklehurst	Emmeline Pankhurst	Russell Smart	Ramsay MacDonald	Philip Snowden	John Penny
1899	Keir Hardie	France Littlewood	Bruce Glasier	Joseph Burgess	James Parker	Russell Smart	Ramsay MacDonald	Philip Snowden	John Penny
1900	Bruce Glasier	France Littlewood	Keir Hardie	Joseph Burgess	James Parker	Ramsay Macdonald	Sidney Shallard	Philip Snowden	John Penny
1901	Bruce Glasier	T. D. Benson	Keir Hardie	Fred Jowett	James Parker	Ramsay Macdonald	Sidney Shallard	Philip Snowden	John Penny
1902	Bruce Glasier	T. D. Benson	Keir Hardie	Fred Jowett	James Parker	Ramsay Macdonald	Sidney Shallard	Philip Snowden	John Penny
1903	Philip Snowden	T. D. Benson	Keir Hardie	Fred Jowett	James Parker	Ramsay Macdonald	Bruce Glasier	Isabella Ford	Francis Johnson
1904	Philip Snowden	T. D. Benson	Keir Hardie	Fred Jowett	James Parker	Ramsay Macdonald	Bruce Glasier	Emmeline Pankhurst	Francis Johnson
1905	Philip Snowden	T. D. Benson	Keir Hardie	Fred Jowett	James Parker	Ramsay Macdonald	Bruce Glasier	Isabella Ford	Francis Johnson

== 1906 to 1909 ==
By 1906, there was a feeling that there was too little change in the membership of the NAC, and activists highly popular in one region but little known in others were unable to win places on it. As a result, seven regional divisions were created, each holding conferences to elect one NAC member, joined by the chair, treasurer and secretary and four national members, who continued to be elected by delegates at conference.

Year	Chair	Treasurer	National	National	National	National	1 Scotland	2 North East	3 Yorkshire	4 North West & Ireland	5 South Wales	6 Midlands	7 South	General Secretary
1906	Ramsay Macdonald	T. D. Benson	Isabella Ford	Bruce Glasier	Keir Hardie	Philip Snowden	William Stewart	Thomas Richardson	T. Russell Williams	James Howard	William Field	Harry Brockhouse	Margaret McMillan	Francis Johnson
1907	Ramsay Macdonald	T. D. Benson	James Parker	Bruce Glasier	Keir Hardie	Philip Snowden	William Stewart	William Wood	T. Russell Williams	James Howard	William Field	Harry Brockhouse	Margaret McMillan	Francis Johnson
1908	Ramsay Macdonald	T. D. Benson	William Anderson	Bruce Glasier	Keir Hardie	Philip Snowden	William Stewart	W. E. Moll	Ben Riley	James Howard	William Field	Harry Brockhouse	Margaret McMillan	Francis Johnson

== 1909 to 1970 ==
In 1909, the divisions were reorganised, and four more created, and further adjustments were made over the next three years, including in 1912 the formation of a single division for the whole of Wales. This endured for many decades.

From 1935, the ILP's conferences were based around a policy statement from the NAC. The NAC began electing a smaller executive committee from its ranks, and with the executive committee taking on more powers, the NAC met less frequently.

Year	Chair	Treasurer	National	National	National	National	1 Scotland	2 North East	3 Yorkshire	4 Midlands	5 East Anglia	6 London & South	7 South West	8 South Wales	9 Lancashire	10 Manchester	11 Ireland & Cumbria	Gen Sec
1909	Fred Jowett	T. D. Benson	William Anderson	J. R. Clynes	George Lansbury	Mary Macarthur	Thomas McKerrell	W. E. Moll	Ben Riley	Leonard Hall	Bill Holmes	Robert Ensor	James H. Belcher	William Field	William Williams	J. M. McLachlan	Hugh Stockman	Francis Johnson
1910	William Anderson	T. D. Benson	Bruce Glasier	Fred Jowett	George Lansbury	Mary Macarthur	Thomas McKerrell	W. E. Moll	Ben Riley	Leonard Hall	Bill Holmes	Harry Snell	James H. Belcher	Harry Davies	C. T. Douthwaite	J. M. McLachlan	Merged into Division 2	Francis Johnson
1911	William Anderson	T. D. Benson	Bruce Glasier	Fred Jowett	George Lansbury	Mary Macarthur	Thomas McKerrell	W. E. Moll	Ben Riley	J. W. Kneeshaw	Bill Holmes	Harry Dubery	Geoffrey A. Ramsay	Harry Davies	R. C. Wallhead	J. M. McLachlan	Merged into Division 2	Francis Johnson

Year	Chair	Treasurer	National	National	National	National	1 Scotland	2 North East	3 Yorkshire	4 Midlands	5 East Anglia	6 London & South	7 South West	8 Wales	9 Lancashire	Gen Sec
1912	William Anderson	T. D. Benson	Bruce Glasier	Fred Jowett	Mary Macarthur	J. M. McLachlan	James A. Allan	W. E. Moll	Ben Riley	John Kneeshaw	Bill Holmes	Harry Dubery	Geoffrey A. Ramsay	James Winstone	R. C. Wallhead	Francis Johnson
1913	Keir Hardie	T. D. Benson	Bruce Glasier	Fred Jowett	William Anderson	Margaret Bondfield	James A. Allan	W. E. Moll	John Palin	John Kneeshaw	Bill Holmes	Harry Dubery	Geoffrey A. Ramsay	John Watt	R. C. Wallhead	Francis Johnson
1914	Fred Jowett	T. D. Benson	Bruce Glasier	Keir Hardie	William Anderson	Margaret Bondfield	James Maxton	W. E. Moll	Charlie Glyde	John Kneeshaw	Bill Holmes	Harry Dubery	Walter Ayles	Ivor H. Thomas	R. C. Wallhead	Francis Johnson
1915	Fred Jowett	T. D. Benson	Bruce Glasier	Keir Hardie	William Anderson	Margaret Bondfield	James Maxton	W. E. Moll	Ben Riley	John Kneeshaw	Bill Holmes	Harry Dubery	Walter Ayles	Ivor H. Thomas	R. C. Wallhead	Francis Johnson
1916	Fred Jowett	T. D. Benson	Bruce Glasier	Philip Snowden	William Anderson	Margaret Bondfield	Tom Johnston	W. E. Moll	Ben Riley	John Kneeshaw	Harry Dubery		Walter Ayles	Ivor H. Thomas	R. C. Wallhead	Francis Johnson
1917	Philip Snowden	T. D. Benson	Bruce Glasier	Fred Jowett	William Anderson	Margaret Bondfield	Tom Johnston	W. E. Moll	Ben Riley	J. W. Murby	Harry Dubery		Walter Ayles	Ivor H. Thomas	R. C. Wallhead	Francis Johnson
1918	Philip Snowden	T. D. Benson	Bruce Glasier	Fred Jowett	James Maxton	Margaret Bondfield	J. B. Houston	W. E. Moll	Ben Riley	J. W. Murby	Herbert Witard		Walter Ayles	Ivor H. Thomas	R. C. Wallhead	Francis Johnson
1919	Philip Snowden	T. D. Benson	David Kirkwood	Fred Jowett	Neil Maclean	Margaret Bondfield	Hugh Guthrie	W. E. Moll	Ben Riley	J. W. Murby	Herbert Witard		Walter Ayles	Ivor H. Thomas	R. C. Wallhead	Francis Johnson
1920	R. C. Wallhead	Philip Snowden	David Kirkwood	Fred Jowett	Neil Maclean	Margaret Bondfield	Manny Shinwell	Jack Lees	Ben Riley	Clement Bundock	Herbert Witard	Clifford Allen	Walter Ayles	John Barr	James Hindle Hudson	Francis Johnson
1921	R. C. Wallhead	Philip Snowden	David Kirkwood	Fred Jowett	Neil Maclean	Ramsay Macdonald	Manny Shinwell	Jack Lees	Ben Riley	Clement Bundock	Herbert Witard	Ernest E. Hunter	Walter Ayles	Morgan Jones	James Hindle Hudson	Francis Johnson
1922	R. C. Wallhead	Clifford Allen	David Kirkwood	Fred Jowett	Neil Maclean	Ramsay Macdonald	Manny Shinwell	Jack Lees	Ben Riley	Charles Simmons	Percy F. Pollard	Ernest E. Hunter	Walter Ayles	Morgan Jones	James Hindle Hudson	Francis Johnson
1923	Clifford Allen	George Benson	R. C. Wallhead	Fred Jowett	John Wheatley	Ramsay Macdonald	Patrick Dollan	Jack Lees	Ben Riley	Clement Bundock	Percy F. Pollard	Ernest E. Hunter	Walter Ayles	George Gethin	James Hindle Hudson	Francis Johnson
1924	Clifford Allen	George Benson	R. C. Wallhead	Fred Jowett	John Wheatley	Ramsay Macdonald	Patrick Dollan	Jack Lees	Ben Riley	George Banton	Percy F. Pollard	Ernest E. Hunter	Walter Ayles	George Gethin	James Hindle Hudson	Fenner Brockway
1925	Clifford Allen	Charles Roden Buxton	R. C. Wallhead	Fred Jowett	John Wheatley	James Maxton	Patrick Dollan	Fred Tait	Ben Riley	Fred Longden	Percy F. Pollard	Ernest E. Hunter	Walter Ayles	Harry Davies	Elijah Sandham	Fenner Brockway
1926	James Maxton	Charles Roden Buxton	R. C. Wallhead	David Kirkwood	Minnie Pallister		Patrick Dollan	Fred Tait	Thomas William Stamford	Fred Longden	Dorothy Jewson	John Scurr	Walter Ayles	Harry Davies	Elijah Sandham	Fenner Brockway
1927	James Maxton	Charles Roden Buxton	R. C. Wallhead	David Kirkwood	Oswald Mosley	Manny Shinwell	Patrick Dollan	Fred Tait	Thomas William Stamford	Frank Wise	Dorothy Jewson	Ernest E. Hunter	Fred Berriman	David Mort	Elijah Sandham	John Paton
1928	James Maxton	Fred Jowett	John William Moor	David Kirkwood	Oswald Mosley	Manny Shinwell	Patrick Dollan	Fred Tait	Thomas William Stamford	Frank Wise	Dorothy Jewson	John Scurr	Fred Berriman	David Mort	Elijah Sandham	John Paton
1929	James Maxton	Fred Jowett	John William Moor	David Kirkwood	Fenner Brockway	Manny Shinwell	Patrick Dollan	Fred Tait	Thomas William Stamford	Frank Wise	Dorothy Jewson	J. Allen Skinner	Kate Spurrell	David Mort	Elijah Sandham	John Paton
1930	James Maxton	Fred Jowett	John William Moor	David Kirkwood	Fenner Brockway	John Wheatley	Patrick Dollan	Fred Tait	Percy Williams	Frank Wise	Dorothy Jewson	J. Allen Skinner	Kate Spurrell	David Thomas	Elijah Sandham	John Paton
1931	Fenner Brockway	Fred Jowett	James Maxton	David Kirkwood	R. C. Wallhead	Frank Wise	Patrick Dollan	Fred Tait	Percy Williams	Jim Garton	Dorothy Jewson	J. Allen Skinner	Kate Spurrell	Dai Jones	Elijah Sandham	John Paton
1932	Fenner Brockway	Fred Jowett	James Maxton	Campbell Stephen	R. C. Wallhead	Frank Wise	Patrick Dollan	Tom Stephenson	Percy Williams	Jim Garton	Dorothy Jewson	J. Allen Skinner	Kate Spurrell	Dai Jones	Elijah Sandham	John Paton
1933	James Maxton	Fred Jowett	C. A. Smith	Campbell Stephen	Jennie Lee	Fenner Brockway	John McGovern	Tom Stephenson	Percy Williams	Jim Garton	Dorothy Jewson	Jack Gaster	Kate Spurrell	E. B. James	Elijah Sandham	Fenner Brockway
1934	James Maxton	Fred Jowett	C. A. Smith	Campbell Stephen	Jennie Lee	Alex Smillie	John McGovern	Tom Stephenson	Percy Williams	Sam Leckie	George Johnson	Jack Gaster	Kate Spurrell	E. B. James	Bob Edwards	Fenner Brockway
1935	James Maxton	Fred Jowett	James Carmichael	Campbell Stephen	Jennie Lee	Fenner Brockway	John McGovern	Tom Stephenson	Percy Williams	Sam Leckie	George Johnson	Jack Gaster	Kate Spurrell	E. B. James	Bob Edwards	Fenner Brockway
1936	James Maxton	Fred Jowett	James Carmichael	Campbell Stephen	Wilfred Young	Fenner Brockway	John McGovern	Tom Stephenson	Percy Williams	Sam Leckie	George Johnson	John Aplin	Kate Spurrell	Jim Davies	Bob Edwards	Fenner Brockway
1937	James Maxton	Fred Jowett	James Carmichael	Campbell Stephen	Sam Leckie	Fenner Brockway	John McGovern	Tom Stephenson	Percy Williams	Tom Reed	George Johnson	John Aplin	Kate Spurrell	Jim Davies	Bob Edwards	Fenner Brockway
1938	James Maxton	Fred Jowett	James Carmichael	Campbell Stephen	John Aplin	Fenner Brockway	John McGovern	Tom Stephenson	Percy Williams	Tom Reed	George Johnson	Jack Hammond	Kate Spurrell	Emrys Thomas	Bob Edwards	Fenner Brockway
1939	C. A. Smith	Fred Jowett	James Carmichael	James Maxton	Will Ballantine	Fenner Brockway	David Gibson	Tom Stephenson	Percy Williams	Tom Reed	George Johnson	Jack Hammond	Fred Berriman	Emrys Thomas	Bob Edwards	John McNair
1940	C. A. Smith	Fred Jowett	James Carmichael	James Maxton	Will Ballantine	Fenner Brockway	John McGovern	Tom Stephenson	Percy Williams	Tom Reed	George Johnson	Walter Padley	Fred Berriman	John Aplin	Bob Edwards	John McNair
1941	John McGovern	Fred Jowett	James Carmichael	James Maxton	Will Ballantine	Fenner Brockway	Tom Taylor	Tom Stephenson	Percy Williams	Tom Reed	George Johnson	Walter Padley	George Woodall	Emrys Thomas	Bob Edwards	John McNair
1942	John McGovern	Fred Jowett	James Carmichael	James Maxton	Will Ballantine	Fenner Brockway	Tom Taylor	Norman Winters	Percy Williams	Tom Reed	George Johnson	Walter Padley	Kate Spurrell	Emrys Thomas	Bob Edwards	John McNair
1943	Bob Edwards	Fred Jowett	F. A. Ridley	James Maxton	Will Ballantine	Fenner Brockway	David Gibson	T. Dan Smith	Percy Williams	Tom Reed	George Johnson	Walter Padley	Kate Spurrell	Emrys Thomas	Fred Barton	John McNair
1944	Bob Edwards	Percy Williams	F. A. Ridley	James Maxton	Will Ballantine	Fenner Brockway	David Gibson	T. Dan Smith	Don Bateman	Tom Reed	George Johnson	Walter Padley	Kate Spurrell	Emrys Thomas	Fred Barton	John McNair
1945	Bob Edwards	Percy Williams	F. A. Ridley	James Maxton	Will Ballantine	Arthur Eaton	David Gibson	Norman Winters	Don Bateman	Tom Reed	Alf Nicholls	Walter Padley	Kate Spurrell	Emrys Thomas	Fred Barton	John McNair
1946	Bob Edwards	Percy Williams	F. A. Ridley	Don Bateman	Will Ballantine	James Taylor	David Gibson	Norman Winters	George Craker	Tom Reed	Alf Nicholls	Tom Colyer	Kate Spurrell	Emrys Thomas	Fred Barton	John McNair
1947	Bob Edwards	Percy Williams	F. A. Ridley	Tom Colyer	Will Ballantine	George Stone	David Gibson	Norman Winters	George Craker	Tom Reed	Alf Nicholls	Wilfred Wigham	Kate Spurrell	Emrys Thomas	Fred Barton	John McNair
1948	David Gibson	Percy Williams	F. A. Ridley	Bob Edwards	Will Ballantine	Harley Millichap	James Taylor	Norman Winters	George Craker	Tom Reed	Ted Hardiment	Wilfred Wigham	Amy Woodall	Emrys Thomas	Fred Barton	John McNair
1949	David Gibson	Harley Millichap	Tom Colyer	Fred Barton	Will Ballantine	Jim Taylor	Robert Duncan	Norman Winters	Percy Williams	Tom Reed	Ted Hardiment	Wilfred Wigham	Don Bateman	Emrys Thomas	May Edwards	John McNair
1950	David Gibson	Harley Millichap	Tom Colyer	Fred Barton	Jim Graham	Jim Taylor	Robert Duncan	Mark Sadler	Percy Williams	John Gill	Dick Barnes	Len Collier	Don Bateman	Len Woods	Eric Hughes	John McNair
1951	Fred Barton	Harley Millichap	Tom Colyer	Vacant	Vacant	Emrys Thomas	Jim Graham	Mark Sadler	Percy Williams	John Gill	Dick Barnes	Len Collier	Don Bateman	Gwladys Thomas	Stan Iveson	John McNair
1952	Fred Barton	Harley Millichap	Tom Colyer	Stan Birkett	Dan Carradice	Annie Maxton	Jim Graham	Mark Sadler	Cissie Smith	John Gill	Dick Barnes	Wilfred Wigham	Don Bateman	David Thomas	Stan Iveson	John McNair
1953	Fred Barton	Anne Gill	Don Bateman	Jim Graham	Dan Carradice	Annie Maxton	Bert Vallance	Jack Scott	Cissie Smith	John Gill	Dick Barnes	Emrys Thomas	Harry Hardcastle	Merged into Division 7	Stan Iveson	John McNair
1954	Annie Maxton	Anne Gill	Don Bateman	Jim Graham	Stan Birkett	Jack Scott	Bert Vallance	Mark Sadler	Cissie Smith	John Gill	Dick Barnes	Ken Eaton	Harry Hardcastle	Merged into Division 7	Stan Iveson	Wilfred Wigham
1955	Annie Maxton	Anne Gill	Don Bateman	Jim Graham	Stan Birkett	Jack Scott	Bert Vallance	Mark Sadler	Cissie Smith	John Gill	Dick Barnes	Fred Morel	Harry Hardcastle	Merged into Division 7	Stan Iveson	Wilfred Wigham
1956	Annie Maxton	Anne Gill	Don Bateman	Jim Graham	Stan Birkett	Jim McKie	Bert Vallance	Mark Sadler	Ruby Sellers	John Gill	Dick Barnes	Fred Morel	Harry Hardcastle	Merged into Division 7	Stan Iveson	Wilfred Wigham
1957	Jim Graham	Anne Gill	Don Bateman	Annie Maxton	William Park	Jim McKie	Bert Vallance	Mark Sadler	Ruby Sellers	John Gill	Dick Barnes	Fred Morel	Harry Hardcastle	Merged into Division 7	Stan Iveson	Wilfred Wigham
1958	Jim Graham	Anne Gill	Don Bateman	Annie Maxton	William Park	Emrys Thomas	Bert Vallance	Mark Sadler	Ruby Sellers	Ken Eaton	Dick Barnes	Bill Hanley	Harry Hardcastle	Merged into Division 7	Stan Iveson	Wilfred Wigham
1959	Jim Graham	Anne Gill	Don Bateman	Annie Maxton	William Park	Emrys Thomas	Bert Vallance	Jack Scott	Ruby Sellers	Ken Eaton	Vacant	Bill Christopher	Harry Hardcastle	Merged into Division 7	Stan Iveson	Wilfred Wigham
1960	Annie Maxton	Anne Gill	Don Bateman	Jim Graham	Jim McKie	Fred Morel	Bert Vallance	Jack Scott	Ruby Sellers	Ken Eaton	Vacant	Bill Christopher	Harry Hardcastle	Merged into Division 7	Stan Iveson	
1961	Fred Morel	Anne Gill	Don Bateman	Jim Graham	Jim McKie	Annie Maxton	Bert Vallance	Jack Scott	Eric Preston	Ken Eaton	Vacant	Emrys Thomas	Harry Hardcastle	Merged into Division 7	Stan Iveson	
1962	Emrys Thomas	Anne Gill	Don Bateman	Jim Graham	Jim McKie	Annie Maxton	Bert Vallance	Jack Scott	Ruby Sellers	Graham Childs	Vacant	Fred Morel	Harry Hardcastle	Merged into Division 7	Stan Iveson	Penny Lockett
1963	Emrys Thomas	Don Bateman	Eric Preston	Jim Graham	Jim McKie	Bessie Murray	Bert Vallance	Jack Scott	Brian Hawkins	Arthur Taylor	Vacant	Fred Morel	Harry Hardcastle	Merged into Division 7	Stan Iveson	Jenny Morel
1964	Emrys Thomas	Don Bateman	Isabel Colman	Jim Graham	Brian Dean	Douglas Kepper	Bert Vallance	Jack Scott	Brian Hawkins	John Pugh	Vacant	Fred Morel	Harry Hardcastle	Merged into Division 7	Stan Iveson	Hira Mukherjee
1965	Emrys Thomas	Don Bateman	Isabel Colman	Jim Graham	Brian Dean	Wilfred Wigham	Bert Vallance	Jack Scott	Tony Coxon	Graham Childs	Vacant	Fred Morel	Harry Hardcastle	Merged into Division 7	Stan Iveson	Hira Mukherjee
1966	Emrys Thomas	Don Bateman	Isabel Colman	Jim Graham	Eric Preston	Wilfred Wigham	Mary Maxton	Daryl Hepple	Tony Coxon	Graham Childs	Vacant	Fred Morel	Harry Hardcastle	Merged into Division 7	Stan Iveson	Hira Mukherjee
1967	Emrys Thomas	Don Bateman	Isabel Colman	Tony Coxon	Bessie Murray	John Preston	Marian Morris	Vacant	Eric Preston	Graham Childs	Dick Barnes	Fred Morel	Harry Hardcastle	Merged into Division 7	Stan Iveson	Hira Mukherjee
1968	Emrys Thomas	Don Bateman	Alistair Graham	Tony Coxon	Bessie Murray	John Preston	Bert Vallance	Vacant	Eric Preston	Graham Childs	Dick Barnes	Fred Morel	Harry Hardcastle	Merged into Division 7	Stan Iveson	Hira Mukherjee
1969	Emrys Thomas	Don Bateman	Alistair Graham	Harry Newton	Eric Preston	Annie Read	William MacCreadie	Pat McIntyre	Brian Hawkins	Graham Childs	Dick Barnes	Bill Turner	Harry Hardcastle	Merged into Division 7	Stan Iveson	Hira Mukherjee

== 1970 onwards ==
Faced with a continuing decline in membership, in 1970 the NAC was restructured, with twelve members serving alongside the chair, treasurer and general secretary.

Year	Chair	Treasurer	Member	Member	Member	Member	Member	Member	Member	Member	Member	Member	Member	Member	Gen Sec
1970	Emrys Thomas	Don Bateman	David Alexander	Tony Coxon	Brian Dean	Alistair Graham	Anne-Marie Graham	Brian Hawkins	Stan Iveson	Colin Livett	William MacReadie	Pat McIntyre	Eric Preston	Barry Winter	Hira Mukherjee
1971	Emrys Thomas	Don Bateman	Hira Mukherjee			Alistair Graham	Anne-Marie Graham	Brian Hawkins	Stan Iveson	Colin Livett		Pat McIntyre	Eric Preston		Barry Winter
1972	Emrys Thomas	Don Bateman	Hira Mukherjee	Robin Jenkins	Danny Keneally	Alistair Graham	Anne-Marie Graham	Brian Hawkins	Stan Iveson	Colin Livett	David McGregor	Pat McIntyre	Eric Preston	Jenny Morel	Barry Winter
