= John Penny (politician) =

British socialist activist

John Penny (30 October 1870 – 9 January 1938) was a British socialist activist.

Born in Preston, Penny stayed on at school after the age of fourteen as a pupil-teacher. He then qualified as a teacher in his own right, and became the headmaster of a local elementary school. In 1892, he left this job to become editor of the Preston Advertiser. That year, he was a founder of a local branch of the Fabian Society, then in 1893 was instrumental in it becoming part of the new Independent Labour Party (ILP).

Penny spent much of his time on the ILP, and in 1895 became its assistant general secretary, serving under Tom Mann. In 1898, Mann resigned and Penny replaced him as general secretary, moving to London. He did not take such an activist role as Mann had, instead focusing on the administrative side of the post.

Penny stood down as secretary in 1903, but remained active in the ILP. He was a founder of the Planet Friendly Society in 1905, and by 1908 had moved to Sheffield to work as the organiser of its local district. While there, he was also involved in organising the local ILP, with a particular focus on the coal mining areas. In his spare time, he was a supporter of the co-operative movement, and was on the board of the Sheffield and Ecclesall Co-operative Society.

Party political offices
Preceded by John Robertson	General Secretary of the Independent Labour Party; 1898–1903	Succeeded by Francis Johnson
