= Emrys Thomas =

Welsh politician

John Emrys Thomas (15 May 1900 – 23 December 1996) was a Welsh socialist politician.

Thomas was born in Merthyr Tydfil to a family who were active in the Independent Labour Party (ILP). He studied teaching at Borough Road College and then worked as a schoolteacher in Merthyr, Pontypridd, and later Willesden and Kingsbury in London, eventually becoming acting head at the Woodfield Day Special School, before retiring in 1965.

Thomas was a member of the ILP from an early age, and by the late 1930s was the representative for South Wales on its National Administrative Committee. The ILP disaffiliated from the Labour Party in 1932, and Thomas was a member of a panel who considered the possibility of reaffiliation, in 1939. Their recommendation, against affiliation but to encourage ILP members to join Labour as individuals, was rejected by the ILP conference, and Thomas remained active in the ILP. During World War II, Thomas represented people to the Central Board of Conscientious Objectors, while, by the 1950s, Thomas was chair of the London division of the ILP. He also served as a member of the council of the Movement for Colonial Freedom until 1982.

Thomas was the chair of the ILP from 1962 until 1974. The following year, the ILP finally rejoined the Labour Party, reconstituted as Independent Labour Publications. Thomas continued to serve on its national committee until 1984, when he stood down due to difficulties with his eyesight. He remained active in local politics, and by 1990 was the longest-standing member of the ILP.

Party political offices
Preceded by Jim Davies	Wales Division representative on the National Administrative Council of the Independent Labour Party; 1938–1940	Succeeded by Fred Berriman
Preceded by Fred Berriman	Wales Division representative on the National Administrative Council of the Independent Labour Party; 1941–1950	Succeeded by Len Woods
Preceded by Wilfred Wigham	London Division representative on the National Administrative Council of the Independent Labour Party; 1953–1954	Succeeded by Ken Eaton
Preceded by Bill Christopher	London Division representative on the National Administrative Council of the Independent Labour Party; 1961–1962	Succeeded by Fred Morel
