= Kate Spurrell =

British trade unionist and socialist activist

Spurrell in 1924

Kate Florence Spurrell (March 1886 – c.1968) was a British trade unionist and socialist activist.

Born in Devonport, Devon, England, Spurrell became a schoolteacher in Plymouth and joined the Liberal Party and the National Union of Teachers (NUT). In 1918, she left the Liberals and joined the Independent Labour Party (ILP). She was elected to the executive of the NUT, and served as its president in 1922.

The ILP was affiliated to the Labour Party, and at the 1924 general election, Spurrell stood in Totnes for Labour, but took only 6.1% of the vote. She was again selected in 1929, when she increased her vote share to 12.9%. That year, she was elected to the ILP's National Administrative Council (NAC), representing South West England.

For the 1931 general election, Spurrell was selected by the Camborne Constituency Labour Party as their candidate. She was supported by the ILP, but the Labour Party's national executive refused to back her. Despite this, she took 24.5% of the vote and a strong third place. She stood again at the 1935 general election, but was on this occasion opposed by an official Labour Party candidate, and took only 1.9% of the vote.

Spurrell lost her seat on the ILP's NAC in 1938, but remained active in the party into the 1950s. In 1965, she was interviewed for the BBC Home Service on her experience of standing as an ILP candidate in the 1920s.

Party political offices
| Preceded by Fred Berriman | South West member of the National Administrative Council of the Independent Labour Party; 1929–1939 | Succeeded by Fred Berriman |
| Preceded by George Woodall | South West member of the National Administrative Council of the Independent Labour Party; 1942–1948 | Succeeded by Amy Woodall |
