= Arthur Field =

Arthur Field may refer to:

- Arthur Field (trade unionist) (1869–1944), British trade unionist and socialist activist
- Arthur Mostyn Field (1855–1950), British Royal Navy officer
- A. N. Field (Arthur Nelson Field, 1882–1963), New Zealand journalist, writer and political activist

== See also ==
- Arthur Fields (1884–1953), American singer and songwriter
- Arthur Fields (photographer) (1901–1994), Ukrainian-born Irish street photographer
