= Sidney Shallard =

British socialist activist

Sidney Dillon Shallard (born 1869) was a British socialist activist.

Born in the south of France to British parents, Shallard became interested in radicalism at a young age. When he was seventeen, he became an Anglican Sunday school teacher, and then a year later served as a sacristan. He decided to become a minister at a later date, and in the meantime found work for the War Office at the Woolwich Arsenal, but lost his faith and left the church.

By 1889, Shallard saw himself as a socialist, and joined the Social Democratic Federation, and in 1891 he stood for the party in the London School Board election. During the election campaign, he was arrested while speaking at World's End in Chelsea. He was placed in Holloway Prison while awaiting trial, but released after a week, fined £20 and bound over to keep the peace. The election was held the following week, with Shallard narrowly missing out.

Due to his socialism, Shallard was sacked by the War Office. He found work at a firm of accountants, and in his spare time became chair of the Tenants' Defence League and secretary of the Shop Hours League. He also joined the Fabian Society, and the Independent Labour Party (ILP), serving on its National Administrative Council. The ILP selected him to stand in Birmingham Bordesley at the 1906 UK general election, but he withdrew in 1904, due to poor health.

From the mid-1890s, Shallard worked full-time as a journalist. In 1910, he published Has Liberalism a Future?. He later joined the Men's League for Women's Suffrage, and in 1914 he wrote several articles for Votes for Women.
