= T. D. Benson =

Thomas Duckworth Benson (1857–1926), known as T. D. Benson, was a British socialist activist.

Living in Eccles, Benson worked as an accountant, and later as an estate agent. He first came to prominence as a follower of Swedenborg, and in 1895, he was the founding treasurer of the New Church Socialist Society, and editor of its journal, Uses. He also became active in the Independent Labour Party (ILP), and was the main financial backer of Keir Hardie's unsuccessful candidacy in the 1896 Bradford East by-election.

In 1901, Benson became Treasurer of the ILP. Within the party, he became known as a leader of the right wing. In 1909, when Hardie, Ramsay MacDonald, Philip Snowden and Bruce Glasier resigned in protest at the membership's willingness to oppose sitting Liberal Party candidates, he remained on the executive, working with J. R. Clynes and William Crawford Anderson to win the body to Macdonald's views. He also wrote extensively for the party, including a controversial pamphlet promoting eugenics in a future socialist state.

Benson remained treasurer for twenty years, opposing World War I, but suffering long-term ill health. His son, George Benson, became a Labour Party Member of Parliament, and was also Treasurer of the ILP.

Party political offices
Preceded by France Littlewood	Treasurer of the Independent Labour Party; 1901–1920	Succeeded by Philip Snowden
