= J. W. Buttery =

British socialist activist

J. W. Buttery was a British socialist activist.

Based in Stafford, Buttery became active on the Stafford Trades Council. He joined the Fabian Society in 1890, and became secretary of the Wolverhampton Fabian Society. This was a sufficiently prominent position that he was elected to the first National Administrative Council of the Independent Labour Party, in 1893, as a representative of the Midlands.

In about 1900, Buttery relocated to London, where he worked as a land surveyor with the Land Registry Office. He was also active in the Pharos Club.
