= George Johnson (Independent Labour Party politician) =

British socialist politician

George Francis Johnson (1872–1958) was a British socialist politician who devoted much of his life to the Independent Labour Party (ILP).

Born in London, Johnson worked various jobs, including a period as an actor. He trained as a scientific instrument maker, then became a schoolteacher in Norwich in about 1900, focusing on teaching practical skills. He joined the National Union of Teachers, soon becoming president of its Norfolk association, and also served as president of the Norwich Class Teachers' Association. Around 1905, he joined the ILP and, through it, the Labour Party; by the mid-1920s, he was president of the Norwich ILP, and secretary of the Norwich Labour Party. Later in the decade, he became the chairman of the ILP's Eastern Division.

At the 1922 United Kingdom general election, Johnson stood for the Labour Party in Norwich. He took 15.7% and fourth place in the two-seat constituency. He next contested Great Yarmouth at the 1929 United Kingdom general election, taking third place with 17.8% of the vote.

The ILP split from the Labour Party in 1932, and the East Anglian Division of the ILP became a stronghold of the Revolutionary Policy Committee, which advocated that the ILP should instead join the Communist Party of Great Britain. Johnson opposed this approach, instead working with John Middleton Murry on a manifesto which proposed an independent trajectory for the party. They ultimately triumphed, and from 1934, Johnson served as the division's representative on the party's National Administrative Council (NAC). He was also elected to Norwich City Council, on which he worked closely with the Labour Party, and by the end of the decade, he advocated the ILP reaffiliating to the Labour Party.

Johnson was made an alderman on the city council in 1939, and was selected by the ILP as its Prospective Parliamentary Candidate for Norwich at the next election, although due to World War II, this was not held until 1945, by which time the party had decided not to stand in the seat. He stood down from the NAC in 1945, but remained active in the party until his death in 1958.

Party political offices
Preceded by Dorothy Jewson	Eastern Division representative on the National Administrative Council of the Independent Labour Party; 1934–1945	Succeeded by Alf Nicholls
