= Ernest E. Hunter =

British political activist and journalist

Ernest Edwin Hunter (1883–1947) was a British political activist and journalist.

== Biography ==
Born in Southborough in Kent in 1883, Hunter became interested in socialism in his youth, and joined the Social Democratic Federation in 1901. He later switched to the Independent Labour Party (ILP), and was also an organiser of The Clarion's van movement. In 1913, he worked as a full-time election agent for the Labour Party in Bishop Auckland, and from 1914 to 1916, he was the political agent for the Northumberland Miners' Association.

In 1918, Hunter became the secretary of the No-Conscription Fellowship, but with the end of World War I, this was wound up. From 1921, he served on the National Administrative Council of the ILP, and chaired its London and Southern Counties division. He wrote a number of publications for the party, such as the ABC of Socialism and Socialism at Work, and became the secretary of the ILP's Information Committee. He was close to Ramsay MacDonald, even after MacDonald left the party, and also to John Beckett, with whom he shared membership of the 1917 Club. However, Fenner Brockway disliked Hunter, describing him as "a master of manipulation".

The ILP was affiliated to the Labour Party, for which Hunter stood unsuccessfully in Hackney Central at the 1923 and 1924 United Kingdom general elections. He was the editor of the ILP's newspaper, the New Leader, for a short period in 1929 and 1930. The following year, he opposed the split of the ILP from the Labour Party, deciding to leave the ILP. He found work with the Daily Herald, soon becoming its political editor. He also devoted time to the National Union of Journalists, and served as its president in 1940/41.

== Personal life ==
Ernest married Grace Helen Browning in Walthamstow in 1906. They had three children, Gilbert, Dennis and Margaret, but Grace died soon after the birth of Margaret in January 1911. The Browning family were active supporters of the early Social Democratic Federation in East London, with Grace's brother, Egbert Browning working as an agent for SDF leader, George Lansbury and sister Beatrice who was also an active member of the same movement. Ernest Hunter later remarried to Eva Rolph in Romford in 1920 and had two more children, William and David. William and David were not mothered by Eva Rolph. Ernest had separated from her and cohabited with Eleanor Dalton, an active member of the ILP, from 1924 until his death. (Source-Grandson)

Party political offices
Preceded by Clifford Allen	London Division representative on the Independent Labour Party National Administrative Council; 1921–1926	Succeeded by John Scurr
Preceded by John Scurr	London Division representative on the Independent Labour Party National Administrative Council; 1927–1928	Succeeded by John Scurr
Media offices
Preceded by Fenner Brockway	Editor of the New Leader; 1929–1930	Succeeded by John Paton
Trade union offices
Preceded by J. W. T. Ley	President of the National Union of Journalists; 1940–1941	Succeeded by Tom Foster
