= Harry Davies (socialist) =

Henry Davies (1888 – 1927) was a Welsh socialist politician and trade unionist.

Born in Morfa, Davies worked as a coal miner, then as a checkweighman. He joined the Independent Labour Party (ILP), and was a founder member of the Aberavon Constituency Labour Party. He was elected to serve on the National Administrative Committee of the ILP, as the representative of its Welsh Division, from 1910 until 1912, and again from 1925. He was also elected to Glamorgan County Council, and to Port Talbot Town Council, and was the Mayor of Port Talbot in 1924. That year, he was also elected as chair of the ILP in South Wales.

In political matters, Davies worked closely with Tal Mainwaring, often giving public speeches on socialism together. He was noted as the more impassioned speaker, and his political knowledge was broad; on returning home from work, he was known to dip his hands in cold water in order to wake himself up sufficiently that he could read. He died in 1927, and a memorial hall was erected, as the headquarters of the Taibach Labour Group.

Davies' son, D. H. Davies, followed him into local politics, and served as Mayor of Port Talbot in 1949.

Party political offices
Preceded by William Field	Wales Division representative on the National Administrative Council of the Independent Labour Party; 1910–1912	Succeeded by James Winstone
Preceded by George Gethin	Wales Division representative on the National Administrative Council of the Independent Labour Party; 1925–1927	Succeeded by David Mort
