= Annie Maxton =

Scottish politician and trade unionist (1888–1981)

Annie Drummond Maxton (9 February 1888 – 1981) was a Scottish socialist politician and trade unionist.

Born in Pollokshaws, Renfrewshire in February 1888, Maxton was convinced to join the Independent Labour Party (ILP) by her elder brother, James Maxton. She trained as a teacher and became active in the Educational Institute of Scotland.

The ILP left the Labour Party in 1931, a split which Maxton supported. She was elected to Barrhead Town Council, becoming part of a substantial ILP group there. When internal disputes rocked the ILP in Glasgow, Maxton did not get involved. As a result, in 1937, she was elected Chairman of the Scottish Divisional Council of the ILP - an important position, given that all the ILP's Members of Parliament were based in Glasgow.

With her newfound prominence, Maxton stood in several elections for the ILP, including the 1940 East Renfrewshire by-election. She stood in the important 1948 Glasgow Camlachie by-election, but took only 6.4% of the votes cast. By this point, the ILP was in sharp decline, no longer retaining any parliamentary representation. Although many members left to join the Labour Party, Maxton remained loyal to the ILP, and in 1953 was elected its chair, a position she held until 1958. She remained on the party's National Administrative Council for several further years.

Political offices
| Preceded by Fred Barton | Chair of the Independent Labour Party; 1953–1958 | Succeeded by Fred Morel |
