= Russell Smart =

British political activist

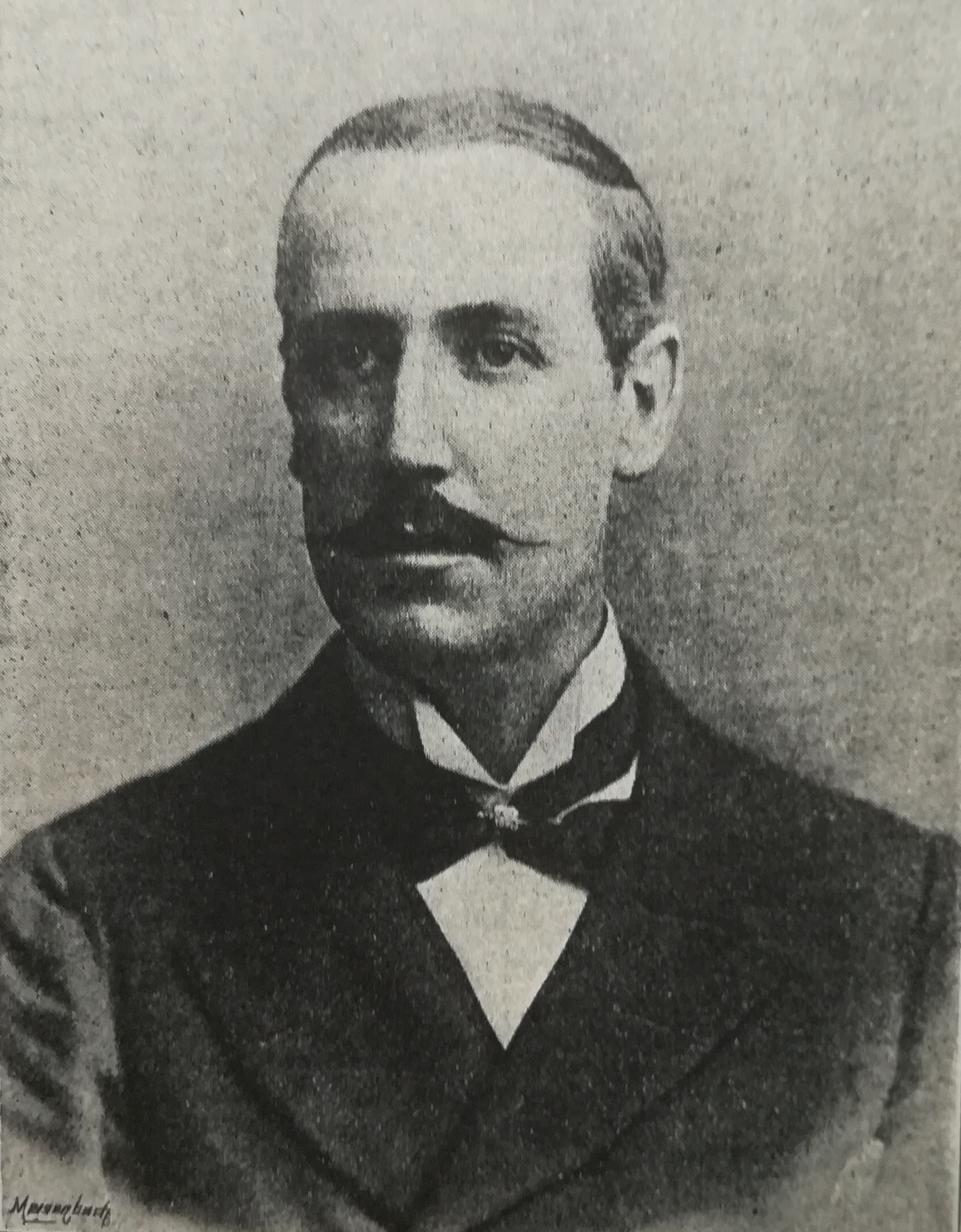
Smart in 1895

Hyman Russell Smart (1858 – 12 November 1923) was a British socialist activist.

Born in London, Smart attended Dulwich College before becoming an actor. However, he soon changed careers and instead became a sanitation engineer.

Smart became interested in socialism and joined the Social Democratic Federation (SDF) and Fabian Society, but he devoted most of his time to the Independent Labour Party (ILP). At the 1895 general election, he stood as the ILP candidate for Huddersfield; he took 11.2% of the vote and was not elected. Despite this, he became increasingly prominent in the ILP, serving on its National Administrative Council.

In 1910, Smart was a signatory to Leonard Hall's Green Manifesto, which called on the ILP to distance itself from the Labour Party's "revisionist" positions. He left the ILP in 1911, becoming a founding member of the British Socialist Party (BSP), which was largely created by the SDF, and he served on its first executive. Disappointed at the BSP's rejection of syndicalism, he and Hall resigned in 1912. He subsequently became less prominent, although he did join a new SDF, successor to the National Socialist Party, in 1923. He died suddenly later that year, while playing chess.
