= John Paton (British politician) =

British politician

John Paton (8 August 1886 – 14 December 1976) was a Labour Party politician in the United Kingdom, and a Member of Parliament (MP) from 1945 to 1964.

He was born in Aberdeen; his father James Paton was a master baker and his mother Isabella Bruce was a seamstress. After leaving school at 13 he became a printer's devil in what is now the Aberdeen Press and Journal. He then became a barber, running his own establishment until the war years. His socialist views repelled his wealthy customers and the shop failed soon after the war. Moving to Glasgow, he worked as a journeyman barber before becoming a full-time political organiser for the Independent Labour Party. he married Jessie Thomson of Springburn, Glasgow and they had a son, John. He moved to London to become the editor of the New Leader.

He was General Secretary of the Independent Labour Party from 1927 to 1933. He was elected at the 1945 general election as MP for the two-seat Norwich constituency. When that constituency was divided at the 1950 general election, he was returned to the House of Commons for the new Norwich North seat, which he held until he retired at the 1964 general election.

His second wife Florence Paton was MP for Rushcliffe from 1945 to 1950.

== See also ==
- List of political families in the United Kingdom

Parliament of the United Kingdom
Preceded by Geoffrey Shakespeare and Henry Strauss	Member of Parliament for Norwich; 1945–1950; With: Lucy Noel-Buxton	Constituency divided
New constituency	Member of Parliament for Norwich North; 1950–1964	Succeeded by George Wallace
Political offices
Preceded by John Taylor	General Secretary of the Independent Labour Party; 1927–1933	Succeeded by Fenner Brockway
Media offices
Preceded by Ernest E. Hunter	Editor of the New Leader; 1930–1931	Succeeded by Fenner Brockway
