= List of incidents of grave disorder in the British House of Commons =

In the event of "grave disorder" breaking out in the House of Commons of the United Kingdom, the Speaker has the power to suspend or to adjourn the sitting. The power derives from a standing order for public business, which states in its current form:

Power of the Speaker to adjourn House or suspend sitting
In case of grave disorder arising in the House the Speaker may, if he thinks it necessary to do so, adjourn the House without putting any question, or suspend the sitting for a time to be named by him.

— Standing Order 46

The rule was introduced on 17 February 1902 as a resolution: as proposed the Speaker could act "if in the interests of order he thinks it desirable"; as agreed it was "in the case of grave disorder arising ... if he thinks it necessary". This was initially a Sessional Order, effective only for that session. It was made permanent (a "Standing Order of the House") on 1 December 1902. It was amended to its current wording as part of a general revision of standing orders effected on 28 July 1948. The rules for televising the Commons require the broadcast to focus on the Speaker (or other occupant of the Chair) during "grave disorder", defined as "incidents of individual, but more likely collective, misconduct of such a serious disruptive nature as to place in jeopardy the continuation of the sitting". Broadcasters were unhappy with this restriction.

Meetings of standing committees are governed by separate rules of procedure, though their chairperson has similar powers, exercised for example by Roger Gale at the committee stage of the Criminal Justice and Police Bill 2001. In the Commons chamber, the Deputy Speaker or other temporary occupant of the Speaker's chair can invoke S.O. 46. However, a Committee of the Whole House (as for the committee stage of important bills) is chaired by the Deputy Speaker sitting as Chairman of Ways and Means not in the Speaker's chair. If grave disorder arises, he must call for order, rise as Chairman of Ways and Means, wait for the mace to be replaced, sit in the Speaker's chair, and then stand, before he may invoke S.O. 46.

The following table lists all the occasions on grave disorder has occasioned suspension or adjournment under this Standing Order.

Suspensions and adjournments of the British House of Commons for grave disorder
Date	Occasion	References (Note: "Journal" references are (until 2015) volume and page from Journals of the House of Commons and (since 2015) session, day number, and index from the House of Commons' Votes And Proceedings; external links are to PDF files before 1997 and webpages thereafter. Hansard references are series, volume, and column(s); external links are to webpages.)	
Date	Occasion	Journal	Hansard
22 May 1905	The Liberal Party leader Henry Campbell-Bannerman led an adjournment debate on colonial preference, demanding a statement from Prime Minister Arthur Balfour. However the Government chose Secretary of State for the Colonies, Alfred Lyttelton, to reply. Liberal MPs, considering that Lyttelton did not have sufficient authority, refused to allow him to speak and demanded that the prime minister state government policy. The Speaker adjourned the sitting.	v160 p202	s4 v146 cc1053–72
24 Jul 1911	Feelings were running high as Prime Minister H. H. Asquith had just announced that King George V would create peers to ensure passage of the Parliament Bill, and had been all but shouted down. When the House moved to begin debate on amendments proposed by the House of Lords, the Government moved that the sitting be adjourned because the House had refused to hear any debate. F. E. Smith, from the Opposition front bench, sought to oppose the motion but was denied a hearing by Government MPs who blamed him for leading the previous disruption. The Speaker adjourned the sitting.	v166 p351	s5 v28 cc1482–4
13 Nov 1912	Two days before, the Government had been defeated in a vote on the financial aspects of home rule for Ireland. The Government put down a motion to reverse the defeat. When Attorney General Rufus Isaacs rose to speak in the debate, Opposition members refused to hear him and demanded an adjournment. After eight minutes the Speaker suspended the sitting for an hour. When the sitting resumed, the disruption did likewise and the Speaker then adjourned the sitting.	v167 p409	s5 v43 cc2053–4
22 Nov 1920	Sir William Davison asked a private notice question to Prime Minister David Lloyd George to express support for British troops in Ireland and call for laws to allow people found with unlicensed arms and ammunition to be shot. Irish Nationalist MP Joseph Devlin then raised the Croke Park massacre the previous day, causing uproar. Devlin continued to try to put his question and was assaulted by Conservative MP John Elsdale Molson who pulled him over the bench; one Government MP was heard calling "Kill him!". The Speaker suspended the sitting for 15 minutes; when it resumed, Molson apologised and Devlin was able to ask his questions and to get an answer.	v175 p436	s5 v135 cc38–9
11 Apr 1923	On the previous day, the Government had been defeated in a Supply Day debate on the Civil Service estimates, over the employment of ex-servicemen. The Government put down a motion to approve the Civil Service estimate without explaining what they intended to do about ex-servicemen. Labour MPs refused to let the debate proceed without a Government pledge to change policy on ex-servicemen. The Speaker announced he was suspending the sitting; a fight then broke out on the floor of the House, when Labour MP Robert Murray was hit on the back of the head and retaliated against Walter Guinness who was standing nearest; while the two were separated, other MPs became involved in scuffles. The sitting was suspended for an hour and 13 minutes, and when it resumed, the sitting was immediately adjourned.	v178 p88	s5 v162 cc1243–66
9 May 1924	At the end of a Friday debate on a private member's bill introduced by George Buchanan on Scottish home rule, the Speaker refused to let the Bill's supporters move the closure of the debate, allowing opponents to talk until time ran out and the Bill fell. Several of the Bill's supporters, including Buchanan, David Kirkwood, Neil Maclean and James Myles Hogge protested at the Speaker's actions and refused to let the House proceed to the next business. The Speaker adjourned the sitting for the day.	v179 p178	s5 v173 cc870–4
25 Jun 1926	Conservative MP Oliver Locker-Lampson secured a Friday adjournment debate on the use of the Anglo-Soviet Trade Agreement by the Soviet Union to promote communist propaganda in Britain. At the end of the debate, Labour MP Thomas Isaac Mardy Jones raised a point of order complaining that no miner MP had been called to speak, despite the debate centring on Soviet contributions to help miners in their dispute which had led to the general strike. Other mining MPs took up the same complaint and it was impossible to resume the debate. The Speaker adjourned the sitting for the day.	v181 p232	s5 v197 cc777–8
16 Nov 1927	The Opposition had put down a motion of censure on the Government for failing to deal adequately with the problems of the coal industry. Leader of the Opposition Ramsay MacDonald opened the debate, but the Government chose President of the Board of Trade Sir Philip Cunliffe-Lister to speak. Labour MPs refused to allow Cunliffe-Lister to speak, demanding that the Prime Minister should speak for the Government. The Speaker suspended the sitting for 58 minutes. When it resumed, Cunliffe-Lister attempted to speak but was still denied a hearing by Labour MPs; after seven minutes the Speaker adjourned the sitting.	v182 p329	s5 v210 cc1067–84
2 Jul 1931	John McGovern was called to put his question to the Secretary of State for Scotland William Adamson concerning arrests of lay preachers in Glasgow. He continued to ask supplementary questions demanding the release of the preachers, and the Speaker directed him to resume his seat. McGovern refused and was 'named' for his defiance of the Speaker; a motion to suspend him from the service of the House was carried. McGovern refused to leave and the Serjeant-at-Arms was ordered to remove him by force. Labour MPs James Maxton, John Beckett and John Kinley came to McGovern's help in resisting the Serjeant-at-Arms and his assistants, causing a mass brawl. The Speaker suspended the sitting for 19 minutes while the struggle went on.	v186 p333	s5 v254 cc1465–71
22 Jul 1936 (Note: Date on which the sitting began, as used in parliamentary records; however, the incident happened after midnight and so technically on the following day.)	A debate on the Unemployment Assistance Regulations had begun at 3:59 pm. After 26 hours of debate, Sir John Simon was winding up for the Government and appeared to refer to "stinginess" in some local councils, including Glasgow. Glaswegian MP George Buchanan protested and denounced Simon as a liar, refusing to withdraw his remark. The Speaker 'named' him for an unparliamentary remark and a motion was proposed to suspend him. Fellow Glasgow MP Campbell Stephen then objected and refused to sit down. The Speaker then suspended the sitting for fifteen minutes; when it resumed, Buchanan, Stephen and a third Glasgow MP John McGovern were all suspended from the service of the House for disruption.	v191 p341	s5 v315 cc835–48
1 Nov 1956	Military action against Egypt over the Suez Canal had just begun and the Minister of Defence, Antony Head, came to make a statement. As supplementary questions were asked, a dispute arose over what subjects would be in order in an Opposition debate which was to follow, and Labour MPs disputed the Speaker's interpretation. The Speaker suspended the sitting for half an hour. When the sitting resumed, supplementary questions on the statement continued.	v211 p428	s5 v558 cc1619–30
8 Feb 1961	The Government introduced a resolution to increase the amount of National Insurance paid in contributions to the National Health Service. The Labour opposition had previously held a full day's debate on this and other changes (which it objected to). There was a bad-tempered debate in which many Labour MPs sought to speak; with several remaining but at 12:30 am, the Deputy Speaker called Financial Secretary to the Treasury Sir Edward Boyle to sum up. Labour MPs protested that there were further points to be made but the Deputy Speaker refused to allow the debate to be prolonged. With Boyle unable to speak, Government Chief Whip Martin Redmayne then moved the closure. Labour refused to name tellers so that the closure and the main motion were agreed without a vote. Labour deputy leader George Brown continued to dispute the Deputy Speaker's actions, accusing him of arranging a private deal with the Government Chief Whip. The Deputy Speaker adjourned the sitting.	v216 p98	s5 v634 cc574–92
6 Dec 1961	At committee stage of the Commonwealth Immigrants Bill, Sir Gordon Touche in his capacity as Chairman of Ways and Means announced the result of a division with the totals reversed, then corrected himself. A disorderly dispute developed over the selection of amendments for debate. Touche as Deputy Speaker suspended the sitting for half an hour. On resumption, dispute over amendments continued and eventually a motion to end debate was carried without any further progress being made.	v217 p55	s5 v650 cc1455–1500
23 Jul 1970	During a statement by Chancellor of the Duchy of Lancaster Anthony Barber on negotiations with the European Communities, a member of the public in the gallery threw two canisters of CS gas into the chamber. Many MPs were overcome and Tom Swain had to be taken to hospital, along with two members of the House of Commons staff. The sitting was suspended for an hour and 55 minutes to allow the gas to clear.	v226 p68	s5 v804 c785
25 Jan 1971	During debate on a motion to guillotine debate on the Industrial Relations Bill, Secretary of State for Employment Robert Carr was barracked by Labour MPs (particularly Charles Loughlin and Alex Eadie) who then raised points of order to disrupt debate, and a group of Labour MPs gathered on the floor of the House in an attempt to halt the debate. The Speaker suspended the sitting for 15 minutes; when it resumed a motion to extend debate was carried and debate on amendments to the guillotine motion began.	v226 p216	s5 v810 cc156–60
20 Jan 1972	On the day that unemployment statistics exceeded one million for the first time since the Second World War, Labour MPs barracked Prime Minister Edward Heath from the start of Prime Minister's Questions shouting "Heath out!" and prevented any questions being asked or answered. The Speaker suspended the sitting for 11 minutes, until the scheduled end of the question session.	v227 p109	s5 v829 cc660–1
4 Mar 1975	Opposition spokesman on Industry Michael Heseltine raised a point of order about the timing of a debate on a motion to give subsidies to motorcycle manufacturer Norton Villiers Triumph. The reply from Secretary of State for Industry Tony Benn appeared to contradict assurances given by Leader of the House of Commons Edward Short the previous night. Opposition MPs raised points of order accusing the government of lying about the financial condition of the company. The Speaker suspended the sitting for 20 minutes. Angry confrontation continued and Nigel Lawson was seen to hit junior Minister Clinton Davis with his House of Commons Order Paper. On resuming the Leader of the House made a statement explaining the confusion.	v231 p259	s5 v887 cc1270–6
27 May 1976	The Speaker had accepted a suggestion by Conservative MP Robin Maxwell-Hyslop that the Aircraft and Shipbuilding Bill was hybrid. The government moved a motion to reverse the ruling; after a debate the Government won by 1 vote when Tom Pendry, who was supposed to be paired and absent, voted anyway. Opposition Industry Secretary Michael Heseltine removed the House of Commons mace from its place on the table and advanced towards the government front bench. The Speaker suspended the sitting for 20 minutes; when it resumed, the House immediately adjourned.	v232 p360	s5 v912 cc767–8
6 Jul 1978	During points of order about debates on the Scotland Bill, members of the public threw manure into the chamber from the gallery. The Speaker suspended the sitting for 20 minutes to allow it to be cleaned.	v234 p438	s5 v953 cc675–6
13 Nov 1980	Points of order were being raised about a government announcement of increased rents for council houses when the Gentleman Usher of the Black Rod arrived from the House of Lords to summon MPs to the ceremony of prorogation (end) of the session. Labour MPs refused to allow him in, demanding more detail from the government on rents. The Speaker suspended the sitting for 11 minutes. On resuming, Labour MPs continued to press for more details from the government. After a further suspension of 15 minutes, the Secretary of State for the Environment Michael Heseltine made a longer statement.	v237 p851	s5 v992 cc763–70
16 Nov 1981	Ulster Unionist MP Robert Bradford had been murdered two days before and the Secretary of State for Northern Ireland James Prior made a statement on security. His statement was disrupted by members of the Democratic Unionist Party from the Members' Gallery. The Speaker suspended the sitting for 10 minutes. On resuming, all three MPs were 'named' and suspended from the service of the House; the sitting was suspended for a further 10 minutes so that they could be removed by force.	v238 p27	s6 v13 cc23–5
21 Nov 1984	The Secretary of State for Social Services Norman Fowler attempted to make a statement on the Government's decision to withdraw some welfare benefits from the families of strikers. Labour MPs disrupted the statement to protest at the decision. The Speaker suspended the sitting for 10 minutes. On resuming, Labour MPs stood in front of the table of the House and refused to take their seats. The Speaker then adjourned the sitting.	v241 p41	s6 v68 cc385–6
17 Jan 1985	After questions to the Leader of the House of Commons John Biffen about future business, Labour MPs continued to raise points of order demanding a debate on the National Union of Miners strike. A private member's bill was presented but the House was prevented from moving to its scheduled business. The Speaker suspended the sitting for 20 minutes; when it resumed, the scheduled business began.	v241 p163	s6 v71 cc520–6
15 Mar 1988	During the 1988 budget statement of Chancellor of the Exchequer Nigel Lawson, Labour MP Dave Nellist led a group who attempted to intervene and disrupt the sitting; he refused to resume his seat. The Deputy Speaker suspended the sitting for 10 minutes. On resuming the budget speech continued.	v244 p383	s6 v129 cc1012–3
13 Mar 1990	After an all-night sitting on the National Health Service and Community Care Bill, Labour MPs attempted to prolong proceedings in the hope that the House would keep sitting beyond 2:30 pm so that the next day's sitting would be cancelled. When Conservative MP Emma Nicholson was unable to hold her half-hour adjournment debate, the Speaker adjourned the sitting.	v246 p247	s6 v169 cc461–2
3 Jul 1990	The Secretary of State for Health Kenneth Clarke used a rare but established procedure to make a statement about NHS trusts after the end of question time. Labour MPs objected that the procedure used deprived them of the ability to scrutinise the details of the statement and therefore of the ability properly to question the Secretary of State; the time for the statement was also taken out of a Labour-initiated debate. After a series of points of order were raised, disrupting the questioning, the Speaker suspended the sitting for 10 minutes. On its resumption the Speaker announced that the statement would be made in full on the following day.	v246 p513	s6 v175 cc859–67
17 Dec 1992	During general debates held before the Christmas adjournment, Scottish Labour MPs raised points of order demanding a Government statement on the announcement that eight NHS hospitals in Scotland were to become NHS trusts. When Conservative MP Richard Ottaway was unable to hold his debate, the Speaker suspended the sitting for 8 minutes. On resuming, MPs continued to demand a statement and prevent the debate taking place. The Speaker suspended the sitting for 2 hours 40 minutes, resuming only to allow royal assent to be signified to three new Acts of Parliament and then to adjourn for the Christmas recess.	v249 p332	s6 v216 cc579–88
4 Feb 2004	During a debate on the Hutton Inquiry report, members of the public in the gallery persistently interjected. The Speaker suspended the sitting for 12 minutes to allow the gallery to be cleared.	v260 p117 (Note: Not identified in the Commons Journal explicitly as an exercise of powers under S.O. 46.)	s6 v417 c771
19 May 2004	During Prime Minister's Questions, Tony Blair was hit by some purple flour-filled condoms thrown from the gallery by a member of the group Fathers 4 Justice. The Speaker suspended the sitting for 1 hour 12 minutes.	v260 p342	s6 v421 cc974–5
15 Sep 2004	During debate on the Hunting Bill, members of the public opposed to the Bill entered the chamber of the House of Commons. The Deputy Speaker suspended the sitting for 20 minutes.	v260 p521	s6 v424 c1337
22 Mar 2017	During a division, the sitting was suspended on security advice, due to a terrorist incident in Old Palace Yard. While the suspension was in force, the Leader of the House David Lidington made a brief statement explaining the situation. (This was recorded in Hansard as an "addendum" to the days' proceedings.) After 35 minutes the sitting resumed; Lidington explained that, due to the Parliamentary Estate being in lockdown, business could not resume that day, and moved an adjournment.	2016-17 No.129 7–8	s6 v623 cc902–3
