= Fred Berriman =

British politician (1879 – 1945)

Frederick Berriman (1879 – 1945) was a British socialist politician.

Born in Bristol, Hall St Bedminster Berriman became a compositor, and joined the Typographical Association, serving as the President of the Bristol Typographical Society from 1913 until 1916. Through this, he was a member of the Bristol Trades Council, and from 1920 until 1925 served as its vice-president.

Berriman also joined the Independent Labour Party (ILP), and was chair of its Bristol branch from 1912 until 1916. As a conscientious objector during World War I, he was sentenced to hard labour. After release, he was again chair of the Bristol ILP from 1922 until 1925, when he became its secretary. The ILP was affiliated to the Labour Party, and Berriman became president of the Bristol Borough Labour Party in 1924.

Berriman served as the representative of the South West district on the National Administrative Council of the ILP from 1927 to 1929, after which he was elected to Bristol City Council. He devoted much of his time to the council, on which, unusually, the ILP worked jointly with the Labour Party; in 1937, he was elected as chair of the Labour group. He returned to the ILP National Administrative Council in 1939.

In 1944, Berriman resigned his council seat, due to poor health, and he died the following year.

Party political offices
Preceded by Walter Ayles	South West member of the National Administrative Council of the Independent Labour Party; 1927–1929	Succeeded by Kate Spurrell
Preceded by Kate Spurrell	South West member of the National Administrative Council of the Independent Labour Party; 1939–1941	Succeeded by George Woodall
