= Thomas Taylor, Baron Taylor of Gryfe =

The Right Honourable The Lord Taylor of Gryfe FRSE DL

Member of the House of Lords
- Lord Temporal
- Life peerage 29 January 1968 – 13 July 2001

Personal details
- Born: 27 April 1912
- Died: 13 July 2001 (aged 89)

Thomas Johnston Taylor, Baron Taylor of Gryfe FRSE DL LLD (27 April 1912 – 13 July 2001) was a British politician and businessman. He was affectionately known as Tom Taylor.

== Personal life ==
Taylor was born in Glasgow on 27 April 1912. His father, John Sharp Taylor, was an Independent Labour Party (ILP) member. He died when Tom was three years old and the latter was raised with his two siblings by his mother from that time.

He was educated at Bellahouston Academy. His first job upon leaving school was as an office boy in the Scottish Co-operative Wholesale Society. He was later their Chairman.

In 1931 a scholarship led to his living in Germany, where he also returned later in his youth. He was a member of the German Young Socialists but was opposed to the rise of the Nazi Party. During the Second World War he was a conscientious objector. Taylor later became a Quaker.

In 1977 he was elected a Fellow of the Royal Society of Edinburgh. His proposers were Alick Buchanan-Smith, Baron Balerno, Robert Allan Smith, Donald McCallum and Sir David Lowe.

Taylor was married in 1943 to Isobel Wands and had two daughters, Jill and Joyce. He died on 13 July 2001.

== Political career ==
As a young man Taylor was a member of the ILP, and was elected to Glasgow City Council in 1934 as the city's youngest ever councillor. He stood for the ILP as a parliamentary candidate in the 1941 Edinburgh Central by-election. He later joined the Labour Party, then the Social Democratic Party (SDP) and the Owenite 'continuing' SDP, before returning to Labour in 1990.

Taylor opposed Scottish devolution. Although an opponent of the Government's Railways Bill in 1993, he noted that he had no objection to privatisation as a concept.

On 29 January 1968 he was created a life peer as Baron Taylor of Gryfe, of Bridge of Weir in the County of Renfrew. From then he had a seat in the House of Lords.

== Outside politics ==
Taylor served as President of the Co-operative Wholesale Society in Scotland and chaired the UK Forestry Commission. From 1971 to 1980, he was chairman of Scottish Railways and a number of other companies, including twelve years as the chairman of Morgan Grenfell Scotland.

Party political offices
Preceded by John McGovern	Scottish Division representative on the Independent Labour Party National Administrative Council; 1941–1943	Succeeded by David Gibson
