= Labour Leader =

British socialist newspaper (1888–1986)

The Labour Leader was a British socialist newspaper published for almost one hundred years. It was later renamed New Leader and Socialist Leader, before finally taking the name Labour Leader again.

== 19th century ==
The origins of the paper lay in The Miner, a monthly paper founded by Keir Hardie in 1887. Its main purpose was to advocate for a federation of Scottish miners. The first issue contained an influential programme for labour, co-authored by Hardie and Chisholm Robertson, marking Hardie's switch from support for the Liberal Party to advocating independent labour candidacies. The paper was used as Hardie's platform in the 1888 Mid Lanarkshire by-election, following which Hardie became a founder member of the Scottish Labour Party and relaunched The Miner as the Labour Leader.

In 1893, the Scottish Labour Party affiliated to the Independent Labour Party (ILP). Hardie became the party's first leader and began using the Labour Leader as a forum for the development of policy for the new party. In 1894 he was able to increase the paper's frequency from monthly to weekly.

== 20th century ==
Hardie continued to publish and edit the Labour Leader until 1904, when he sold it to the ILP, amid some controversy on the appropriate recompense due to him. The ILP appointed John Bruce Glasier to replace Hardie as editor in January 1905. Glasier was able to take sales from 13,000 at the start of his editorship to 43,000 in 1908, but attracted criticism from some ILP members for consistently endorsing all the actions of the party's leadership. He stood down from the post in April 1909.

In 1909, party members were encouraged to write for the Labour Leader rather than rival publications. For example, Frederick William Jowett's parliamentary column was transferred from The Clarion.

Throughout this period the paper was known for investigative reporting and high-quality journalism. As early as 1899 an investigation by Hardie had sensationally exposed poor conditions at the Overtoun Chemical Works, while in 1913 and 14, Walton Newbold worked on a lengthy article exposing the interests of the defence industry.

=== First World War ===
In 1912, the editorship passed to Fenner Brockway, who imposed a policy of strident pacifism, opposing the First World War with front-page headlines such as "The War Must Be Stopped" and "Down With The War". In 1915, the paper's offices were raided by the police and Brockway was charged with publishing seditious material. Brockway won the case, but commented that "if we weren't dangerous to the government we were failing in our duty!" However, his work in the No-Conscription Fellowship led to his repeated imprisonment and by 1916 he felt unable to continue as editor. Katherine Glasier took over the editorship. In 1917 the government prohibited the export of the Labour Leader from the UK. By 1918 Glasier had increased circulation to 62,000, but she became increasingly at odds with the prominent columnist Philip Snowden. His opposition to the October Revolution was vocally resisted by Glasier, and in the ensuing dispute sales fell away. The stress of the dispute may have contributed to her nervous breakdown.

=== Inter-war years ===
After Glasier resigned from the paper Clifford Allen, then the Treasurer of the ILP, decided that a new approach was necessary. The paper was renamed the New Leader and H. N. Brailsford was appointed editor. Alarmed at Brailsford's left-wing reputation, Ramsay MacDonald ensured that Mary Hamilton was appointed as his more moderate deputy, although she soon left the post. Brailsford championed articles on cultural topics alongside an increased proportion of theoretical pieces, and contributed numerous articles proposing a programme for a living wage. Brailsford also managed to obtain several noted contributors to the New Leader, including H. G. Wells, George Bernard Shaw, Bertrand Russell, Hugh Dalton, Norman Angell and C. E. M. Joad. E. M. Forster and H. W. Nevinson contributed book reviews to the New Leader, while Julian Huxley wrote science articles. The magazine also added a literature section, with poems by Frances Cornford and Charlotte Mew, and stories by T. F. Powys. Illustrators for the New Leader included Jack B. Yeats, Muirhead Bone, Käthe Kollwitz and Clare Leighton.

By 1926 circulation had fallen and Brailsford had fallen out of favour with the ILP leadership. Brockway returned to the helm, supporting James Maxton's call for the ILP to stand for "socialism in our time".

In 1929 Brockway was elected as the Member of Parliament for Leyton East and stood down from the paper. He was replaced by John Paton. Paton was also an advocate of the living wage policy, but gave only reluctant support to the idea that the ILP should split from the Labour Party.

Out of Parliament again in 1931, Brockway returned to the editor's chair, remaining in the post until 1946, when he resigned from the ILP and rejoined the Labour Party.

On 11 March 1938, the magazine published an editorial (titled Stalin-Stop!) calling on Joseph Stalin to end the Moscow Trials.

George Orwell's essay "Why I Joined the Independent Labour Party" was published in New Leader on 28 June 1938.

=== After the Second World War ===
Facing a severe decline as many of its activists defected to Labour, the ILP relaunched the paper as the Socialist Leader in 1946, with Douglas Rogers as editor. F. A. Ridley and George Stone were appointed joint editors in 1947, Ridley standing down the following year, but continuing to write regularly for it. Stone pursued a "third force" policy, opposing both capitalism and the Soviet Union. The ILP continued to decline, but remained able to publish a weekly newspaper. A Conservative politician, Cyril Wilson Black, successfully prosecuted the paper for libel after it described him as a racist.

In 1975, the ILP decided to dissolve itself into the Labour Party, renaming its paper as the Labour Leader once again and moving back to monthly publication. Relaunched with a claim to be "Labour's Independent Monthly", it was published by Independent Labour Publications until 1986.

== Editors ==
1888: Keir Hardie
1905: John Bruce Glasier
1909: J. F. Mills
1912: Fenner Brockway
1916: Katherine Glasier
1922: H. N. Brailsford
1926: Fenner Brockway
1929: Ernest E. Hunter
1930: John Paton
1931: Fenner Brockway
1946: Douglas Rogers
1947: Frank Ridley and George Stone
1948: George Stone
1960: Wilfred Wigham
1963: Jack Ellis
1964: Douglas Kepper
1966: John Downing
1970: Robin Jenkins
1970s: Alistair Graham
