= Arthur Field (trade unionist) =

British trade unionist and socialist activist

Arthur George Field (13 July 1869 – 6 December 1944) was a British trade unionist and socialist activist.

== Early life ==
Born in Isleworth (then Middlesex), Field grew up in Maidstone in Kent. He joined the National Secular Society, and at one of its local meetings learned of the Democratic Federation. He joined the organisation, remained a largely inactive member for many years, and joined its successor, the British Socialist Party. He became involved in debating societies, and in 1888 was the founding secretary of the town's Central Debating Society, which he launched with two debates on socialism.

== Political career ==
In the run-up to the 1888 Maidstone by-election, Field worked with George Bateman, Will Parnell and Henry Hyde Champion to found the Maidstone Labour Electoral Association (LEA). The Liberal Party candidate, John Barker, agreed to support a maximum eight hour working day, and on this basis, Field and the LEA supported him. The organisation remained active, and supported a Liberal candidate in the 1889 town council election.

Field worked as a photographer, and decided to found a union for the trade. He took advice from Tom Mann, and launched the union at a meeting in London in 1890, but it attracted only fifty members, and was dissolved the following year. Field instead encouraged photographers to join the Amalgamated Society of Lithographic Artists, but the union would not agree to take on only qualified photographers, and Field later suggested that photographers join the National Union of Shop Assistants. Having worked with Mann and Champion, Field was active in the London dock strike of 1889, and was elected to the executive of the Dock, Wharf, Riverside and General Labourers' Union, representing the Medway area. Field took little part in the local branches of the union, and by mid-1892, they had all closed.

In 1890, Field organised a conference to found a Kent Independent Labour Party, which was affiliated with the Legal Eight Hours and International League, and was chaired by Edward Aveling. It sponsored W. C. Steadman as a Liberal-Labour candidate in Mid Kent at the 1892 UK general election, although he was not elected. Field also helped Joseph Burgess found a Labour Club in Leicester.

Field attended the 1893 Congress of the Socialist International as a representative of the party. In 1893, he attended the founding conference of the Independent Labour Party (ILP), representing both Bromley and Leicester. While the Leicester branch had no activity, and Field had no ongoing relationship with it, he was elected to the ILP's first National Administrative Council, as a representative of the Midlands. On the council, Field was a lone voice in support of Champion, and lost his seat at the 1894 conference. He remained active in the ILP, as secretary of otherwise unorganised areas of Kent. In 1896, he was a delegate from the Chatham Branch of the ILP and attended the London International Congress (27 July to 1 August). He was a photographer of the 1897 conference, but remained a supporter of Champion and therefore marginalised in the party.

Field served as secretary of the Maidstone and District Trades Council for much of the 1890s until 1902, when he was elected as president. In his new role, he led it to back independent labour candidates, but was accused of working with the Conservative Party to do so, and he resigned in protest in 1903. Instead, he moved to Battersea, where he became the secretary of the South and East of England Trades and Labour Councils. He tried to affiliate this organisation to the Labour Representation Committee, and soon faced a rival in the form of the Federation of Metropolitan Trades and Labour Councils, leading Field to abandon his federation.

Inspired by the Young Turks, in 1908 Field became interested in Islam, and by 1914 he was the founding secretary of the Anglo-Ottoman Society. He was invited to speak on the subject by the City of London ILP, and this inspired him to rejoin the party. Along with other leaders of the Anglo-Ottoman Society, in 1917 he founded the Workers' Welfare League of India. This support for the Indian independence movement led him to become the London representative of the Free Press of India and Indian National Newspapers, and he developed a friendship with Shapurji Saklatvala.

Field supported the British Socialist Party's formation of the Communist Party of Great Britain (CPGB), becoming a founder member. Within the party, he worked with Saklatvala and Mann, along with S. A. Dange and M. N. Roy. However, in 1927, the CPGB criticised Saklatvala for initiating his children as Parsis, and Field resigned in sympathy, thereafter writing anti-communist articles for the Indian press.
