= David Gibson (British politician) =

Scottish socialist politician

David Gibson was a Scottish socialist politician.

Gibson joined the Independent Labour Party (ILP) and at the 1935 general election was its candidate in Stirling East and Clackmannan. He was elected to Glasgow City Council, and he stood unsuccessfully in the 1947 Liverpool Edge Hill by-election.

In 1948, Gibson succeeded Robert Edwards as chairman of the ILP. As chairman, he focussed on opposing war, and feared that the North Atlantic Treaty would lead to a Third World War.

Gibson was succeeded as chairman by Fred Barton in 1951, and focussed on his role as chair of the Glasgow Corporation's Housing sub-Committee on Sites and Buildings, working to build council housing in the city as rapidly as possible. At the 1951 general election, Gibson was selected as the party's candidate for Glasgow Shettleston, but he withdrew shortly before the election, to the disappointment of the party. In 1953, he resigned from the ILP and joined the Labour Party.

By 1961, Gibson was the baillie - most senior magistrate - of Glasgow and was active in the Campaign for Nuclear Disarmament.

Party political offices
Preceded by John McGovern	Scottish Division representative on the Independent Labour Party National Administrative Council; 1939–1940	Succeeded by John McGovern
Preceded by Thomas Taylor	Scottish Division representative on the Independent Labour Party National Administrative Council; 1943–1948	Succeeded by James Taylor
Preceded by Robert Edwards	Chair of the Independent Labour Party; 1948–1951	Succeeded by Fred Barton
