= John McGovern (politician) =

Scottish socialist politician (1887–1968)

John McGovern (13 December 1887 – 14 February 1968) was a Scottish socialist politician.

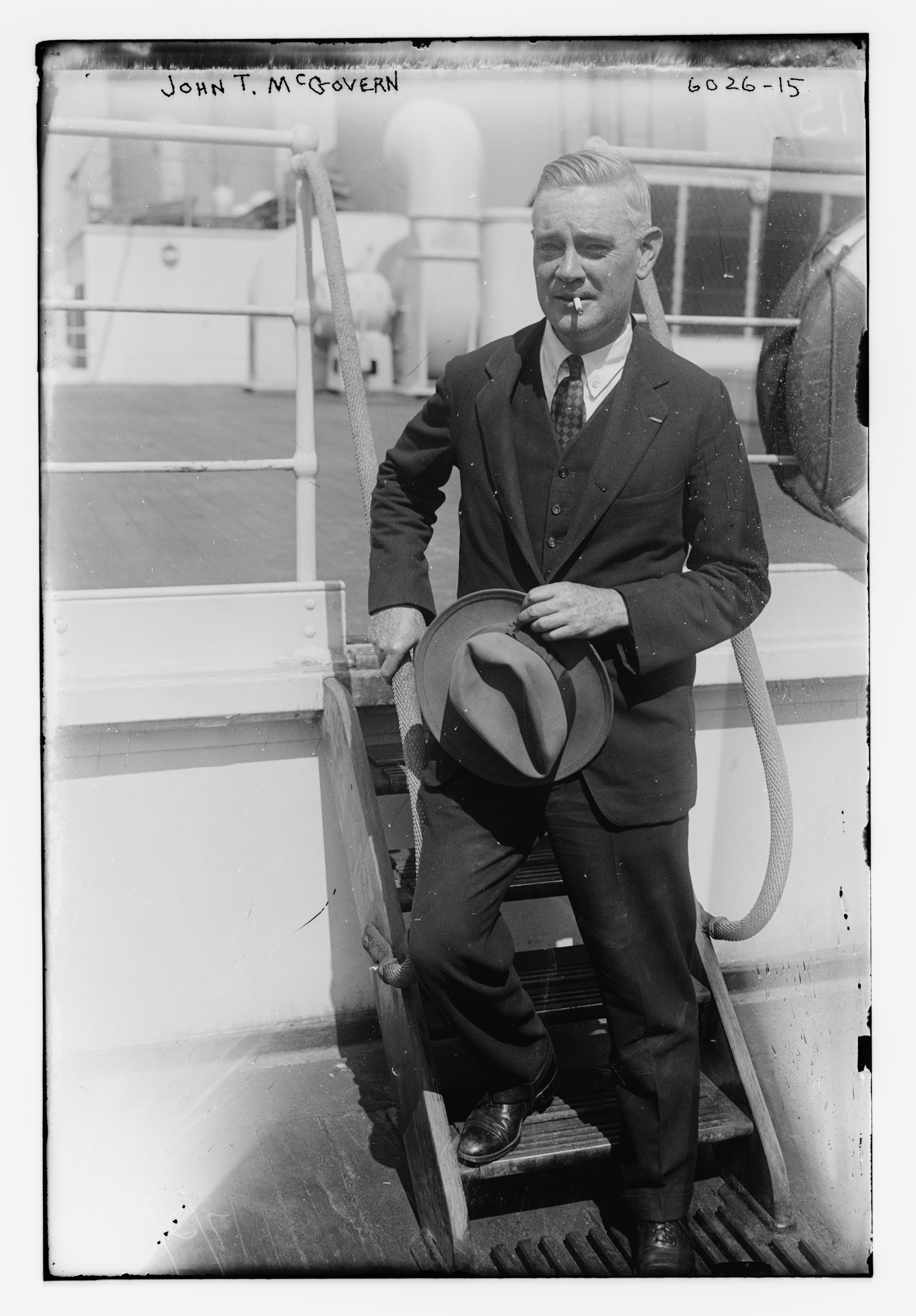
John McGovern

== Early career ==
Born into a Roman Catholic family, McGovern soon became involved in the Labour movement and anarchism. Active in opposition to the First World War, he joined the Anti-Parliamentary Communist Federation and became its treasurer but soon left after disagreements with Guy Aldred. He was a conscientious objector. He emigrated to Australia in 1923, but soon returned and became a prominent member of the Independent Labour Party (ILP), at the time linked to the Labour Party. In 1929 he was elected to Glasgow City Council, a position he held for two years.

== Leading the separation ==
He was elected to Parliament to represent Labour in Glasgow Shettleston in a 1930 by-election. However, he was subsequently expelled from Labour following allegations that he had fixed the election to become the Labour candidate. This led him to become a leading advocate of the view that the ILP should disaffiliate from the Labour Party.

This was achieved the following year, but he was one of only five ILP members to retain their seats at the 1931 general election. He was active in a campaign to re-establish the tradition of free assembly and free speech on Glasgow Green, and after a heated debate in the Commons, refused to leave, eventually being forcibly ejected. He was fined for organising a meeting on the Green in support of this. His appeal against the charges, though unsuccessful, led directly to the reinstatement of the traditional rights. Despite often campaigning alongside communists in the unemployed movement, McGovern, with Richard Wallhead, led the opposition within the ILP to any official working relationship with the Communist Party of Great Britain. He was particularly critical of the Moscow Trials.

== Enquiry of Republican affairs ==
In 1937, McGovern led an ILP commission of enquiry into the affairs of the Republicans in the Spanish Civil War. This was ostensibly to counter allegations made by prominent Catholics concerning Republican treatment of prisoners; however, he also aimed to support the Workers' Party of Marxist Unification (POUM), which was increasingly threatened by the communists, and to find information as to the disappearance of Andrés Nin.

McGovern strongly condemned the Molotov–Ribbentrop Pact, describing it as "the bloodstained handshake of Stalin and Ribbentrop". He remained active through the Second World War, supporting the ILP's pacifist line. When the ILP Chairman C. A. Smith unexpectedly quit the party in 1941 in disagreement with this policy, McGovern was elected in his place, although he held the post for only two years.

== Labour Party ==
The ILP's best known leader, James Maxton, died in 1946. Following this, and encouraged by the policies of the Labour Government, McGovern resigned from the ILP in March 1947 and became a Labour MP. By the end of the year, the remaining ILP MPs had followed him. He was re-elected for Labour in 1950 and 51, and in 1952 led the campaign to permit Trotskyist Tony Cliff to remain in Britain. In November 1954 he had the Labour whip withdrawn for voting in favour of German re-armament, against Labour's policy of abstaining on the vote, and sat as an independent until the whip was restored in March 1955.

McGovern's last years in Parliament were devoted to the campaign for moral re-armament, a cause he had supported since 1938. He resigned from the Labour Party again in 1959 and stood down from Parliament at that year's general election. At the 1964 general election he called for a vote for the Conservative Party.

Parliament of the United Kingdom
Preceded by John Wheatley	Member of Parliament for Glasgow Shettleston; 1930–1959	Succeeded by Myer Galpern
Party political offices
Preceded by Patrick Dollan	Scottish Division representative on the Independent Labour Party National Administrative Council; 1933–1939	Succeeded by David Gibson
Preceded by David Gibson	Scottish Division representative on the Independent Labour Party National Administrative Council; 1940–1941	Succeeded by Thomas Taylor
Preceded by C. A. Smith	Chairman of the Independent Labour Party; 1941–1943	Succeeded by Robert Edwards
