= Katharine Glasier =

English politician and writer (1867–1950)

Katharine Bruce Glasier
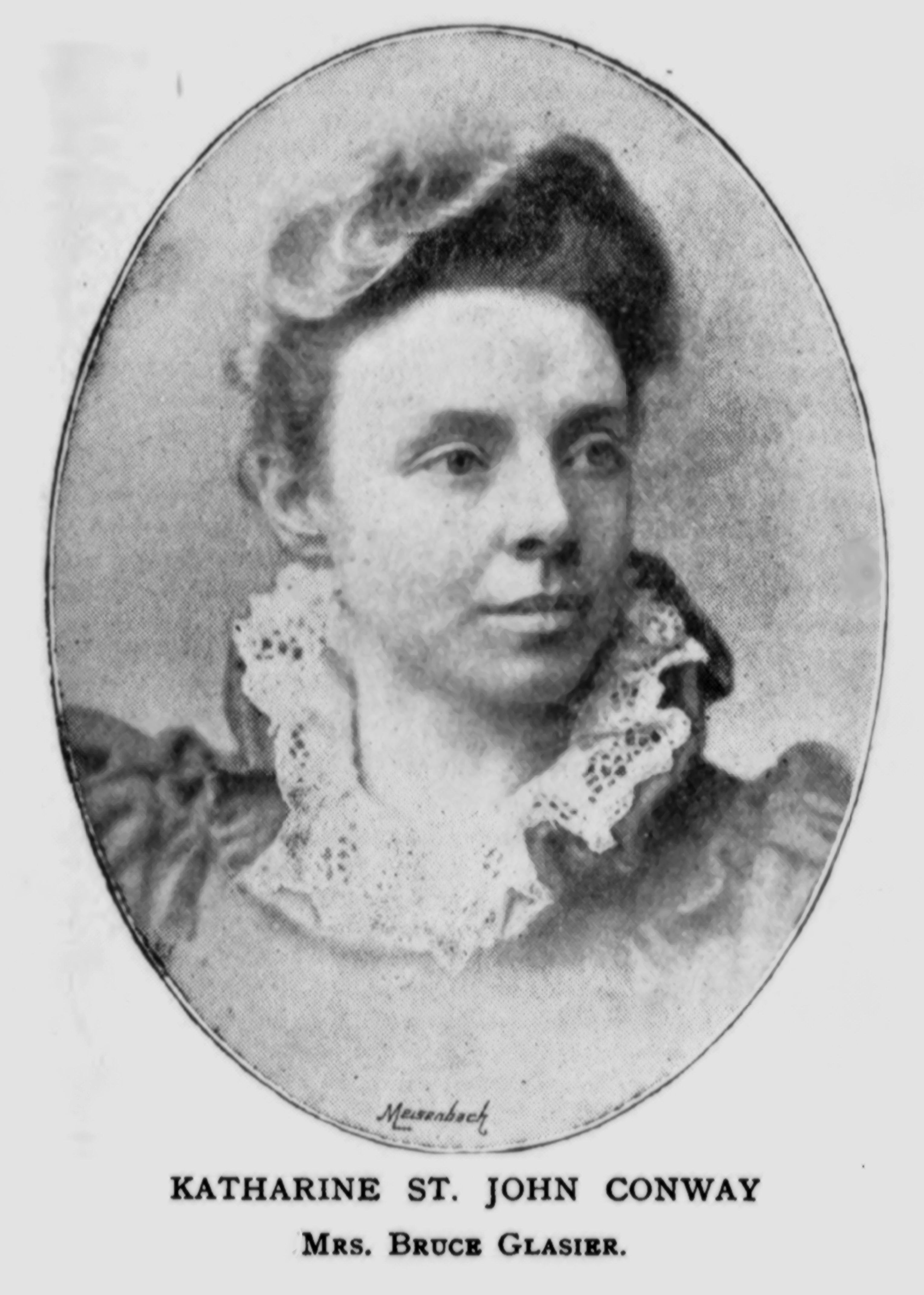
- Katharine Bruce Glasier c. 1895
- Born: Katharine St John Conway; 25 September 1867; Stoke Newington, England
- Died: 14 June 1950 (aged 82); Earby, Lancashire, England
- Known for: socialist and journalist

Katharine Glasier (25 September 1867 – 14 June 1950) was an English socialist politician, journalist and novelist. She became a founder member of the Independent Labour Party in 1893.

== Early years ==
Glasier was born in Stoke Newington as Katharine St John Conway, the second of seven children. Her elder brother was Robert Seymour Conway, a classical scholar and comparative philologist. Their father, Samuel Conway, was a Congregationalist minister based at Chipping Ongar, Essex; his wife, Amy (née Curling) came from a well-off family from Stoke Newington.

The family moved to Walthamstow while Katharine was young. She attended Hackney High School for Girls and then studied classics at Newnham College, Cambridge with a scholarship, graduating with a second-class degree. Despite the practice at Cambridge University in not awarding degrees to women at that time, she appended the usual BA to her name.

== Life and career ==
Conway became a teacher at Redland High School in Bristol, where she was inspired to join the Bristol Socialist Society after seeing a demonstration by striking female cotton workers. She quit her job to become a teacher at a board school in Bristol and moved in with Dan Irving, where she also had to care for his wife. At this time she joined the Fabian Society. She began lecturing for the organisation, and in 1893 became a founding member of the Independent Labour Party (ILP). She was one of the 15 members and the only woman elected to the ILP's first National Administrative Council in January 1893.

She married John Bruce Glasier, a Scottish socialist politician, on 21 June 1893, but she continued to undertake lecture tours. They had three children: Jeannie, Malcolm, and John Glendower (known as Glen).

In the early years of the 20th century, Glasier wrote for a number of publications. She published three novels – Husband and Brother (1894), Aimee Furniss, Scholar (1896), and Marget (1902–3) – and a collection of short stories, Tales from the Derbyshire Hills (1907).

She remained prominent in the ILP and in 1916 took over from Fenner Brockway as editor of its newspaper, the Labour Leader. Initially a highly successful editor who increased the circulation, disputes about her support for the Bolsheviks led to a decline in sales. However, her husband was terminally ill and died in 1920 and she suffered a nervous breakdown in April 1921, resigning the editorship of The Leader, which was taken over by H. N. Brailsford.

In the 1920s, Glasier joined the Society of Friends and the Theosophical Society. She became the ILP's National Organiser, but resigned in 1931 when the ILP left the Labour Party, continuing to work for the Labour Party, after a brief flirtation with the Socialist League. In 1948 she was nominated for the Nobel Peace Price by Labour MP Gilbert McAllister for her "humanitarian work in England and elsewhere".

== Death and legacy ==
Katharine Glasier moved to Glen Cottage in Earby, Lancashire in 1922 and remained there until her death in 1950. Her younger son, Glen, predeceased her in 1928. After her death, Glen Cottage was donated to the Youth Hostels Association for use as a hostel. It has remained as such, although the building is now owned by Pendle Borough Council.

Among her achievements were the introduction of pit-head baths in England, the founding of the Margaret McMillan Memorial College in Bradford, and work for the Save the Children Fund.

The Metropolitan Borough of Islington named after her in 1939 a block of apartments in Hazellville Road, London.

Media offices
Preceded by Fenner Brockway	Editor of the Labour Leader; 1916–1921	Succeeded by H. N. Brailsford
