= Bob Edwards (politician) =

British trade unionist and politician (1905–1990)

Robert Edwards (16 January 1905 – 4 June 1990) was a British trade unionist and an Independent Labour Party (ILP) and Labour Co-operative politician. He was a Member of Parliament (MP) from 1955 to 1987.

== Early life ==
Edwards was born in 1905, in The Dingle, Liverpool. His mother was a factory worker and his father was a harbour master. He had two brothers. One died at sea in the Great War, the other was a crane operator on the docks of Liverpool and a musician.

In 1927, aged 22, Edwards was elected as an Independent Labour Party councillor, becoming one of the youngest councillors in Liverpool. He led an ILP Youth Delegation to the Soviet Union, where he met Leon Trotsky and Joseph Stalin. During the General Strike of 1926 he was a messenger for the Trades Union Congress, delivering messages to it from the individual unions.

In the Spanish Civil War, Edwards led the ILP Contingent in the Workers' Party of Marxist Unification (POUM) on the Aragon front. They left Spain in May 1937.

Edwards was a leading member of the ILP after it split from the Labour Party in the 1930 and 1940s, serving as the party's Chairman from 1943 to 1948.

Between 1947 and 1971, he was the General Secretary of the Chemical Workers' Union, and was also a member of the Transport and General Workers' Union.

== Soviet espionage ==
Edwards was secretly the recipient of the Order of the People's Friendship from the Soviet Union, the third-highest Soviet medal, which was shown to him in Brussels by Leonid Zaitsev, the KGB resident (or rezident), at Copenhagen. Former KGB officer, Oleg Gordievsky, who defected to the UK in 1985, stated that Edwards had been a KGB agent for many years. Edwards had met Stalin and Trotsky while leading a youth delegation to the USSR in 1926. He became a "fully-paid-up KGB agent" providing "high-grade secrets", with MI5 stating that he "would have passed on all he could get hold of".

== Parliamentary career ==
As an ILP candidate, Edwards unsuccessfully contested Chorley at the 1935 general election, and Stretford at a by-election in 1939 and the Newport by-election in 1945 (where he won 45.5% of the votes).

He was elected as Labour Co-operative MP for Bilston in the 1955 general election. The constituency was abolished in 1974, so in the February 1974 election, he stood successfully for Wolverhampton South East which covers a similar area. In 1983, then 78, he became the oldest sitting MP.

Edwards stood down in 1987 aged 82, and was succeeded by Dennis Turner. The former Labour Party leader Michael Foot became the oldest sitting MP after Edwards' retirement.

== Death ==
Edwards died in June 1990, aged 85, three years after his retirement from Parliament.

== Family ==
His nephew Bert Edwards was an international speedway rider.

Parliament of the United Kingdom
| Preceded by Will Nally | Member of Parliament for Bilston; 1955–Feb 1974 | Constituency abolished |
| New constituency | Member of Parliament for Wolverhampton South East; Feb 1974–1987 | Succeeded by Dennis Turner |
Honorary titles
| Preceded by David Weitzman | Oldest sitting member (not Father of the House); 1979–1987 | Succeeded by Michael Foot |
Party political offices
| Preceded by Elijah Sandham | Lancashire Division representative on the Independent Labour Party National Administrative Council; 1934–1943 | Succeeded by Fred Barton |
| Preceded by John McGovern | Chairman of the Independent Labour Party; 1943–1948 | Succeeded by David Gibson |
