= Fred Barton (politician) =

British socialist politician

Frederick George Barton (8 April 1917 – 17 December 1963) was a British socialist politician.

Barton was born in Chorlton, Lancashire in April 1917. He joined the Independent Labour Party (ILP) and was elected chairman of the Stretford Trades Council. By 1944, he was the chairman of the Manchester Federation of the ILP, and was the party's second choice to contest the Manchester Rusholme by-election after Fenner Brockway, but neither accepted the opportunity, and Robert Edwards stood instead.

At the 1950 general election, Barton stood for the party in Newcastle upon Tyne. He then stood for the party at the 1951 Ormskirk by-election.

Barton was elected as chairman of the ILP in March 1951. While chairman, he campaigned against apartheid in South Africa and the Korean War.

In April 1954, Barton was succeeded as chairman by Annie Maxton. Later in the year, he resigned from the ILP and joined the Labour Party. At the 1955 general election, he was the unsuccessful Labour candidate in Stretford, taking 39.1% of the vote, and in 1959, he took 40.4% in Middleton and Prestwich. He became the Liverpool district organiser of the Tobacco Workers' Union. In the run-up to the 1964 general election, he was the Labour Party Prospective Parliamentary Candidate for Liverpool Kirkdale, but he died suddenly in December 1963 from thrombosis.

Party political offices
Preceded by Bob Edwards	Lancashire Division representative on the Independent Labour Party National Administrative Council; 1943–1949	Succeeded by May Edwards
Preceded by David Gibson	Chair of the Independent Labour Party; 1951–1954	Succeeded by Annie Maxton
