= France Littlewood =

British socialist activist (1863-1941)

- Born: 5 August 1863; Honley, Yorkshire, England
- Died: 22 January 1941 (aged 77)
- Education: Almondbury Grammar School
- Occupation: Socialist activist
- Military career
- Branch: British Army
- Rank: Sergeant
- Unit: Volunteer Battalion of the Duke of Wellington's Regiment
- War: First World War

France Littlewood (5 August 1863 – 22 January 1941) was a British socialist activist.

== Biography ==
Born in Honley, then in the West Riding of Yorkshire, Littlewood studied at Almondbury Grammar School before working in his father's dye works. He joined the Liberal Party, which he represented on Honley Local Union, but left in 1891 to join the new Colne Valley Labour Union. In 1893, he was a founder member of the Independent Labour Party (ILP), and he rapidly rose to prominence, becoming national treasurer in 1896, serving until 1902. He held a seat for the party on Honley Urban District Council from 1895 to 1896. His family's firm was declared bankrupt in 1899, although he and his brothers managed to retain ownership of the mill.

At the 1907 Colne Valley by-election, Littlewood was a leading supporter of Victor Grayson, an ILP member who was refused national support because he did not support the Labour Party. Grayson was successful, and Littlewood regained his seat on the Urban District Council, in addition to one on the Board of Guardians. However, the newly renamed Colne Valley Socialist League followed Grayson in moving away from the ILP and towards syndicalism, a position which Littlewood opposed. In 1910, Grayson lost his seat, and the local group split from the ILP, joining the British Socialist Party on its formation, the following year. Littlewood sided with a minority loyal to the ILP.

During the First World War, Littlewood served as a sergeant with the Volunteer Battalion of the Duke of Wellington's Regiment. He remained an ILP supporter until 1928, when he resigned in support of Philip Snowden's economic policies.

Party political offices
Preceded by John Lister	Treasurer of the Independent Labour Party; 1896–1902	Succeeded by T. D. Benson
