= Francis Johnson (ILP politician) =

British socialist activist

Francis Henry Johnson (1878–1970) was a British socialist activist.

Johnson became active in the Independent Labour Party (ILP), and was secretary of its Finsbury branch by 1899. In 1904 he was elected as the party's General Secretary. In July 1916 he applied to Southgate, Middlesex, Military Service Tribunal for exemption as a conscientious objector. On 3 June 1917 he was appointed as joint secretary of the Council of Workers' and Soldiers' Delegates at the convention to hail the Russian Revolution held at the Albert Hall, Leeds, alongside Albert Inkpin.

In 1924 Johnson switched to become Financial Secretary of the ILP, and remained in post until retirement in 1944. He continued as a party activist on a voluntary basis.
