= Independent Labour Publications =

Left-wing British interest group

Independent Labour Publications is a left-wing pressure group inside the British Labour Party. It is the successor to the Independent Labour Party and is mostly known simply as "The ILP" in order to maintain that link with its predecessor organisation.

== Brief history ==
Since its re-establishment in 1975, the ILP has been a campaigning organisation rather than an electoral group (its constitution prevents full members from standing for elective office). Before entering parliament, former Labour Member of Parliament Harry Barnes was a member of the ILP. As an MP, he was obliged to resign and join a supporters group, Friends of the ILP.

It has been involved with opposition to various workfare schemes imposed by the British Conservative government of the 1980s, and has argued for open democratic structures within the Labour Party, and an emphasis on co-operative systems of organising economic activity.

With a headquarters in Leeds, the ILP meets in Scarborough annually to discuss political issues, and its internal administration is overseen by a National Administrative Council (NAC).

== Positions ==
In common with much contemporary left-wing thinking, the ILP's approach rejects both contemporary capitalism and the command economy. But unlike much of the left, it accepts the idea of a market economy as part of democratic socialist thinking. The ILP has been out of line with many traditional leftist positions, for instance in its rejection of a simple "troops out" approach to the conflict in Northern Ireland, and was critical of what it saw as knee-jerk anti-Americanism on the left following the US's reaction to the September 11, 2001 attacks.

== Publications ==
The organisation publishes occasional pamphlets on contemporary issues. The paper Labour Leader (published 1975–86) and the ILP Magazine: for socialist renewal (published 1987–92) were successors to the Independent Labour Party's New Leader (1922–46) and Socialist leader (1946–75). A newsletter called Democratic Socialist was the belated successor to the ILP Magazine.
