= John Bruce Glasier =

Scottish socialist politician (1859–1920)

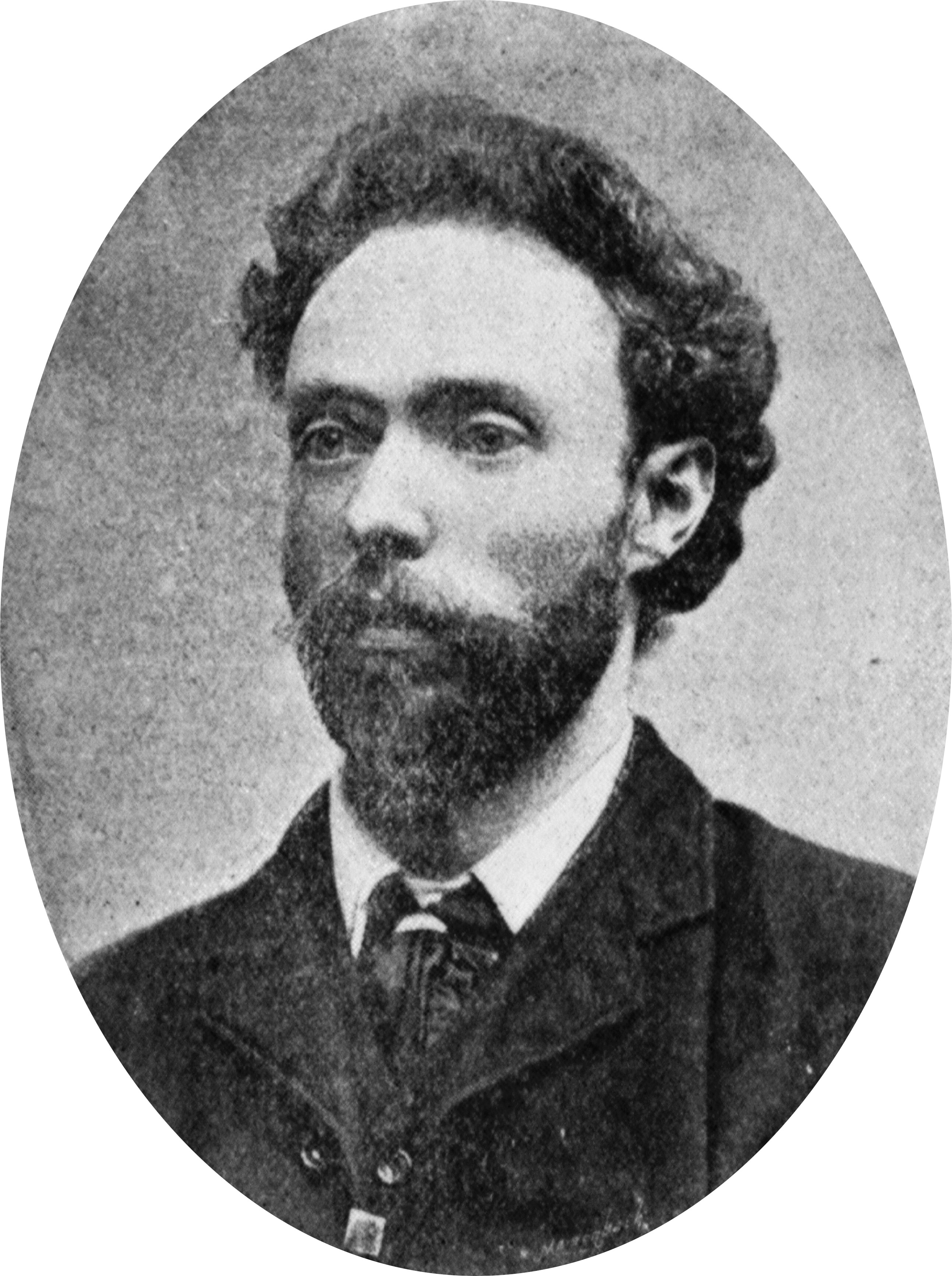
- John Bruce Glasier ca. 1895
- Born: John Bruce; 25 March 1859; Glasgow, Scotland
- Died: 4 June 1920 (aged 61)
- Spouse: Katharine Glasier
- Relatives: Lizzie Glasier (sister)

John Bruce Glasier (25 March 1859 – 4 June 1920) was a Scottish socialist politician, associated mainly with the Independent Labour Party. He was opposed to the First World War.

== Biography ==
Glasier was born in Glasgow as John Bruce, but grew up near Newton Ayr. After the death of his father in 1870, he returned to Glasgow and followed his mother in adding the additional name of "Glasier", thereafter using Bruce as his middle name. He became involved with the Irish Land League's activities in Scotland, and in 1884 was a founder member of the Scottish Land Restoration League, while also joining the Social Democratic Federation (SDF). He joined the Socialist League split from the SDF, becoming the secretary of its Glasgow branch until 1889. In 1893, he joined the Independent Labour Party (ILP).

In that year he married Katherine St John Conway.

Glasier soon became one of the four main ILP leaders, and the editor of ILP News, succeeding Keir Hardie as chairman of the party in 1900 and holding the post for three years. In 1903, he was elected to Chapel-en-le-Frith parish council.

In 1905, Glasier became the editor of Labour Leader, but left the post in 1909 and resigned from the ILP National Council, along with Hardie, Ramsay MacDonald and Philip Snowden. The four were re-elected in 1910 and Glasier remained on the council until 1919. He opposed the First World War. Although struck by cancer in 1915, he continued to write until his death in 1920.

== Works ==
- The I.L.P. and Socialist Year Book: A Guide Book to the Labour and Socialist Movement at Home and Abroad (National Labour Press, 1911)
- Militarism (Independent Labour Party, London, 1915)
- The Peril of Conscription Being Part II of Militarism and Conscription (Independent Labour Party, London, 1915)
- James Keir Hardie: A Memorial (National Labour Press Ltd, London, 1916)
- The Minstrelsy of Peace (National Labour Press, 1918)
- The Meaning of Socialism (Independent Labour Party, 1919)
- Kier Hardie: The Man and his Message (Independent Labour Party, 1919)
- Socialism and Strikes (National Labour Press, Manchester, 1895/1920)
- On the Road to Liberty, poems and ballads (Manchester & London, National Labour Press, 1920)
- William Morris and the Early Days of the Socialist Movement (Longmans, Green and Co, 1921)

Political offices
Preceded by Keir Hardie	Chairman of the Independent Labour Party; 1900–1903	Succeeded by Philip Snowden
Media offices
Preceded by Keir Hardie	Editor of the Labour Leader; 1905–1909	Succeeded by J. T. Mills
