= Adair (name) =

Origin
- Language: Gaelic
- Meaning: "happy spear" or "ford of the oaks"
- Region of origin: England, Scotland, Ulster

Other names
- Variant forms: Athdare, Adair, Adare

Adair is a surname of Scotland. A common misconception is that the surname is related to Edgar, Eadgar, O'daire or MacDaire. Robert Fitzgerald De Athdare was the first Adair. He was from what is now Limerick, Ireland.

Robert Fitzgerald fought a duel against the white knight. The Earls of Desmond had three major allied and interrelated branches with each one having a hereditary knighthood denoted by colour. The Fitzgibbons were the White Knights, The Fitzmaurices and Fitzgeralds were the Green and Black. Although Robert Fitzgerald's father was Earl of Desmond, neither the hereditary knighthood or the earldom had passed to him yet. He’d killed a hereditary knight of an allied wing of the family. Reasons aren’t clear as to why he struck down his cousin but what is clear is that it turned the family against him. Robert became a fugitive, relocating to Wigtownshire in southwestern Scotland. Robert took the surname 'Adare' after the town near his father's lands back in Ireland, or by some accounts where the duel, occurred. Ultimately his name meant Robert Fitzgerald of Adare and would later evolve into Adair. Upon arriving in Scotland, Robert learned that the King of Scotland had placed a bounty on the head of a man named 'Currie'. Currie was outlawed as a thief and pirate. The King promised Currie's castle, deemed nearly impregnable, to whoever would bring him the head of Currie. Robert Adare watched over Dunskey Castle for several days until Currie came out one evening. Robert followed Currie, and engaged the pirate in mortal combat, slaying him at the head of Colfin Glen. Robert took Currie's severed head to the court of Scotland, which explains the Adair crest of a severed head.

== List of persons with the surname ==
- Al Adair (1929–1996), Canadian baseball player, radio broadcaster, author, politician
- Alex Adair (born 1994), British DJ, producer and remixer
- Allan Adair (1897–1988), British army officer, 6th Baronet
- Archibald Adair (died 1647), Irish Anglican bishop
- Arthur Adair (1913–1981), British diplomat
- Barbara Adair, South African author
- Barrett Adair, American political content creator
- Beegie Adair (1937–2022), American jazz pianist
- Belle Adair (1889–1971), American actress
- Benjamin Frank Adair (1852–1902), American politician
- Bethenia Owens-Adair (1840–1926), American social reformer, physician
- Bill Adair (1913–2002), American baseball player/manager
- Bill Adair (journalist), founder of the PolitiFact website
- Billy Adair, soccer player in the American Soccer League
- Brian Adair (1935–2021), Scottish sports administrator
- Bunny Adair (1905–1994), Australian politician
- Catherine Steiner-Adair, American psychologist and author
- Cecil Adair, pen name of author Evelyn Everett-Green
- Charles Adair (soccer) (born 1971), American soccer player/coach
- Sir Charles F. Adair Hore (1874–1950), British civil servant, Permanent Secretary of the Ministry of Pensions
- Charles F. Adair (1874–1936), American park ranger
- Charles Henry Adair (1851–1920), British admiral
- Charles L. Adair (1902–1993) American admiral
- Charles Wallace Adair (1914–2006), American ambassador
- Charles Adair (Royal Marines officer) (1822–1897), General in the Royal Marines
- Cherry Adair (born 1951), American author
- Christia Adair (1893–1989), African-American suffragist and civil rights worker
- Cornelia Adair (1837–1921), Texas ranch landowner
- Cornelia Storrs Adair, (1884–1962), American educator
- Craig Adair (born 1963), New Zealand track cyclist
- Daniel Adair (born 1975), Canadian drummer
- Deb Adair (born 1966), American sound engineer
- Deborah Adair (born 1952), American actress
- Devin Adair, American writer, director and producer.
- Donald Adair (born 1960), American figure skater
- Doug Adair (1929–2019), American TV news anchor and journalist
- Douglass Adair (1912–1968), American historian
- E. Ross Adair (1907–1983), U.S. Representative from Indiana
- Edward Robert Adair (1888–1965), British and Canadian historian
- Eleanor R. Adair (1926–2013), American scientist
- Finlay Cross-Adair (born 2005), English footballer
- Forrest Adair (1865–1936), real estate developer
- George Adair (1823–1899), real estate developer
- George W. Adair Jr. (1874–1921), real estate developer
- Gilbert Adair (1944–2011), Scottish author and journalist
- Gilbert Smithson Adair (1896–1979), British scientist
- Green B. Adair (1840–1914), American cotton merchant
- Harry Adair (born 1997), English cricketer
- Hazel Adair (screenwriter) (1920–2015), British soap opera writer, film producer/director
- Hazel Adair (novelist) (1900–1990), pen name of British author Hazel Iris Addis
- Henry R. Adair (1882–1916), American lieutenant cavalry officer
- Hubert Adair (1917–1940), World War II Royal Air Force pilot
- Hugh Adair (1815–1902), British Liberal Party politician
- Hugh R. Adair (1889–1971), Justice of the Montana Supreme Court
- J. Leroy Adair (1887–1956), U.S. Representative from Illinois
- James Adair (historian) (1709–1783), explorer and author
- James Adair (serjeant-at-law) (c. 1743–1798), Irish soldier, politician
- James Makittrick Adair (1728–1802), Scottish army officer, doctor
- Janet Adair (1901–2005), American actress
- Janice Adair (1905–1996), British actress
- Jay Adair (born 1969/1970), American businessman, (CEO) of Copart
- Jean Adair (1873–1953), Canadian actress
- Jerry Adair (1936–1987), American baseball player
- Jessica Adair (born 1986), American basketball player
- Jim Adair (born 1942), Canadian hockey player
- Jimmy Adair (1907–1982), American baseball player, manager and coach
- John Adair (1757–1840), American soldier, politician (Kentucky)
- John Adair (anthropologist) (1913–1997), American anthropologist
- John Adair (author) (1934–2025), British leadership expert
- John Adair (surveyor) (c. 1655–1722), Scottish surveyor and mapmaker
- John A. M. Adair (1864–1938), U.S. Representative from Indiana
- John Frederick Adair (1852–1913), Irish physicist and cricketer
- John G. Adair, Canadian psychologist
- John George Adair (1823–1885), Scots-Irish businessman
- John Ronald Shafto Adair (1893–1960), Australian businessman and aviator
- Johnny Adair (born 1963), ex-Loyalist Paramilitary
- Joseph Adair (1877–1960), Canadian politician
- Larry Adair (born 1946), American politician
- Mark Adair (born 1996), Irish cricketer
- Mary Adair (born 1936), Cherokee Nation educator and painter
- Mildred Adair (1895–1943), American composer, pianist and teacher
- Molly Adair (1905–1990), British actress
- Nancy Adair, documentary producer
- Natasha Adair (born 1972), American college basketball coach
- Patrick Adair (1624–1694), Irish Presbyterian minister
- Perry Adair (1899–1953), American amateur golfer
- Peter Adair (1943–1996), film-maker and artist
- Red Adair (1915–2004), oil field fire-fighter
- Rhona Adair (1878–1961), British golf champion
- Rick Adair (born 1958), American baseball player, coach
- Robert Adair (actor) (1900–1954), American-born British actor
- Robert Adair (cricketer) (1876–1951), Irish cricketer
- Robert Adair (physicist) (1924–2020), Physics professor
- Robert Adair (politician) (1763–1855), English diplomat
- Robert Adair (surgeon) (c.1711–1790), Irish surgeon
- Robert Adair, 1st Baron Waveney (1811–1886), British politician
- Rod Adair, American politician
- Ron Adair (born 1931), Australian association footballer
- Ross Adair (born 1994), Irish cricketer
- Sadie Bay Adair (1868–1944), American physician
- Sandra Adair (born 1952), American film editor
- Sean Adair (born 1986), South African cricketer
- Thelma C. Davidson Adair (1920–2024), American Presbyterian educator and activist
- T. B. S. Adair (1868–1928), Scottish naval officer and politician
- Tom Adair (1913–1988), American songwriter, composer, and screenwriter
- Trevor Adair (c. 1961–2020), American soccer coach
- Virginia Hamilton Adair (1913–2004), American poet
- William Penn Adair (c. 1828–1880), second chief of the Cherokee nation
- William Adair (1850–1931), Royal Marines officer and Ulster Unionist
- Yvonne Adair (1897–1989), British pianist and composer

=== Fictional characters ===
- Daisy Adair, fictional TV character
- Helen Adair, main character in Comin' Thro the Rye (1923 film)
- Michael Adair, main character in The Conversations at Curlow Creek
- Rachel Adair, fictional character on General Hospital

== List of persons with the given name ==
- Adair Blain (1894–1983), Australian politician
- Adair Ford Boroughs (born 1979/1980), American lawyer and politician
- Adair Cardoso (born 1993), Brazilian singer and composer
- Adair Crawford (1748–1795), Scots-Irish chemist
- Adair Dyer (1932–2015), attorney, international law
- Adair Ferguson (born 1955), Australian rower
- Adair José Guimarães (born 1960), Brazilian bishop
- Adair Hore (1874–1950), British civil servant
- Adair Lion, American rapper
- Adair Margo, American politician
- Adair Bushyhead "Paddy" Mayes (1885–1963), baseball player
- Adair Prieto (born 2001), Mexican biker
- Adair Roche, Baron Roche (1871–1956), British judge
- Adair Tishler (born 1996), American child actress
- Adair Turner, Baron Turner of Ecchinswell (born 1955), British businessman

== See also ==
- Adair (disambiguation)
- Adar (surname)
