= Robert Adair =

Robert Adair may refer to:

- Robert Adair (of Hollybrook) (died 1737), Irish MP for Philipstown (Parliament of Ireland constituency) and protagonist in one version of the song "Robin Adair"
- Robert Adair (surgeon) (died 1790), English surgeon, Inspector-General of the Hospitals and surgeon of the Royal Hospital, Chelsea, father of the politician
- Sir Robert Adair (politician) (1763–1855), British diplomat, son of the surgeon
- Robert Adair, 1st Baron Waveney (1811–1886), English politician, MP for Cambridge 1847–1852 and 1854–1857
- Robert Adair (cricketer) (1876–1951), Irish cricketer
- Robert Adair (actor) (1900–1954), American actor
- Robert Adair (physicist) (1924–2020), American physicist

== See also ==
- Robert Ader (1932–2011), American psychologist who co-founded psychoneuroimmunology
