= John Adair (disambiguation) =

John Adair (1757–1840) was a U.S. soldier, statesman and governor of Kentucky.

John Adair may also refer to:

- John Adair (surveyor) (1660–1718), Scottish surveyor and mapmaker
- John Adair (1732–1837), American pioneer and soldier, early settler of the Knoxville, Tennessee area
- John A. M. Adair (1864–1938), U.S. congressman from Indiana
- John Adair (anthropologist) (1913–1997), American anthropologist
- John George Adair (1823–1885), Scots-Irish businessman and landowner, financier of JA Ranch in the Texas Panhandle
- Johnny Adair (born 1963), Northern Irish paramilitary leader
- John Adair (author) (1934–2025), British consultant and author on leadership
- John Frederick Adair (1852–1913), Irish physicist
- John G. Adair, Canadian psychologist
- John Ronald Shafto Adair (1893–1960), Australian aviator, army officer and businessman
