= Adair =

Adair may refer to:

== People ==
- Adair (name), a surname and given name
- Adair baronets in the Baronetage of the UK

== Places ==
- Adare Manor, a manor house in Adare, County Limerick, Ireland
- Bahia Adair or Adair Bay, a bay in the municipality of San Luis Río Colorado, Sonora
- Magh Adhair, archaeological site located near the village of Quin, County Clare, Ireland

=== United States ===
- Adair, Illinois, an unincorporated census-designated place
- Adair, Iowa, a city
- Adair, an unincorporated community in Casco Township, St. Clair County, Michigan
- Adair, Oklahoma, a town
- Adair Township, Camden County, Missouri
- Adair Village, Oregon, a city
- Adair County (disambiguation)
- Adair Lake, a lake in California
- Adair Mansion, a house and subdivision in Atlanta, Georgia
- Adair Vineyards, a vineyard on the historic Thaddeus Hait Farm in Plattekill, New York
- Adair Park, Adair County, Oklahoma
- Adair Air Force Station, a closed US Air Force station near Corvallis, Oregon
- Camp Adair, Corvallis, Oregon, a US Army training facility from 1942 to 1946
- Fort Adair, a late 18th-century stockade fortification and supply depot north of Knoxville, Tennessee
- Mount Adair, a 5,178-foot (1,578 m) double summit mountain in Alaska

== Other uses ==
- USS Adair (APA-91), a World War II attack transport
- Adair (band), a post hardcore band from St. Louis, Missouri
- Adair v. United States, a US Supreme Court decision
- Adair sepia, a type of decorative limestone found in Ontario, Canada

== See also ==
- "My sweet Adair", a 1915 song by Anatole Friedland and L. Wolfe Gilbert
- Adairs Covered Bridge, Perry County, Pennsylvania
- Dr. John H. Adair House, Owatonna, Minnesota
- Adair County High School (disambiguation)
