= Charles Adair =

Charles Adair may refer to:

- Charles Henry Adair (1851–1920), British admiral
- Charles L. Adair (1902–1993), American rear admiral
- Charles Wallace Adair (1914–2006), US Ambassador to Panama and Uruguay
- Charles Adair (soccer) (born 1971), American retired soccer player
- Sir Charles Adair (Royal Marines officer) (1822–1897), British Royal Marines general
- Charles F. Adair (1874–1936), American park ranger

== See also ==
- Adair (name)
