= Admiral Adair =

Admiral Adair may refer to:

- Charles Henry Adair (1851–1920), British Royal Navy admiral
- Charles L. Adair (1902–1993), American rear admiral
- T. B. S. Adair (1861–1928), British Royal Navy admiral
