= Oakland neighborhood, Knoxville, Tennessee =

Coordinates: 36.0334°N 83.9113°W

The Oakland neighborhood in Fountain City, Tennessee, now included in north Knoxville, Tennessee, was a small, segregated, black community south of Tazewell Pike and west of Beverly Place and Beverly Road. It had a small, segregated, black elementary school, which was boarded up for many years once the Knoxville schools were integrated, and eventually was used for a children's museum.

Nearby white schools were Shannondale, to the north and east on Shannondale Road, and Smithwood (defunct), to the north and west, near the intersection of Tazewell Pike with Jaxboro Pike that is eponymously also known as Smithwood. Next to the north is the ornate Smithwood Baptist Church, and there was once also Smithwood Drugstore and Smithwood Taxicab Service (one vehicle operated out of the Sinclair service station by the owner, "Dub" Tipton.
