= List of compositions by Johann Peter Pixis =

Johann Peter Pixis (1788–1874) was a German musician born in Mannheim; the major parts of his career were spent in Vienna and Paris. He was among many musicians, especially pianists, who came to Paris starting about 1820. Pixis became very successful as a pianist, composer, and collaborative musician. The majority of his published compositions are for piano, including works with orchestra, but he also wrote operas during his years in Vienna—though these were not successful—and chamber music. Among his strongest mature compositions are the seven piano trios ("grand trios").

This list largely reproduces the entry for Pixis in Franz Pazdirek, Universal Handbook of Musical Literature: Practical and Complete Guide to all Musical Publications (Vienna, 1904?; reprint London and Philadelphia), vol. 14, pp. 392–394. Pazdirek organized the entry chronologically. In this list, compositions are sorted by genre.

== Piano ==
=== Piano solo ===
- Grande Sonata in E♭ minor, Op. 2
- Grande Sonata, Op. 3
- Polonaise, Op. 8
- Trois Polonaises, Op.10 [this opus number also used for a piano sonata] (1830)
- Piano Sonata in C minor, Op.10 [this opus number also used for 3 polonaises]
- Six variations sur une romance française pour le piano-forte, Op. 12 [alternate title: Souvenir de Paris] [also a version for violin and piano]
- Variations pour le piano-forte sur la romance du ballet Nina, Op. 13
- Andante mit Variationen für das Piano-Forte, Op. 18
- Variationen über das beliebte Abschieds-Lied aus dem Singspiel Niklas am Scheidewege von Ritter J. von Seyfried, Op. 19 [alternate title: Variationen über ein bekanntes Lied]
- Piano Sonata, Op. 20
- Polonaise sur la cavatine di tanti palpiti de Tancrede de Rossini, Op. 27
- Grande polonaise, Op. 28
- Polonaise brillante sur un air favorite de Charles Keller, Op. 31
- Introduction et rondeau polonaise sur un thème favorite du ballet Lodoiska, musique par Mr. Umlauf, Op. 34
- Grandes variations sur un thème favori de l'opéra Le barbier de Séville de G. Rossini, Op. 36
- Piano Sonata, Op. 38
- Rondoletto sur un boléro espagnol, Op. 38
- Rondino sur un air favori d’Aline, Op. 39
- Premier mélange dans lequel on an introduit des motifs de Robin, Op. 47
- Variationen über ein dänisches Volkslied, Op. 47
- Les Charmes de Vienne, rondeau brilliant, Op. 48
- Rondo polonais sur une marche favorite, Op. 53 [this opus number also used for a potpourri for guitar and piano]
- Deuxiéme rondo polonais sur l’Opéra, Le Barbier de Seville, Op. 54
- Variationen über ein deutsches Volkslied, Op. 55
- Gedank des Abschiedes, Op. 58
- Introduction et rondeau sur une thème favori de Caraffa, Op. 63
- Introduction et grand Rondo hongrois, Op. 64
- “Non più andrait”, thème de l’opera Les Noces de Figaro de W. A. Mozart, varié, Op. 70
- [Premier] mélange ou choix d'airs favoris de l'opéra du Freyschütz, Op. 71
- Mélange ou choix d'airs favoris de l'opéra du Freyschütz, Op. 72
- Souvenir de Paris, rondino, Op. 73
- Divertissement concertant sur des Motifs de l’opéra L’Alcade de la Véga de G. Onslow, Op. 74
- Caprice sur des Motifs de l’opéra Les deux Journées de L. Cherubini, Op. 76
- Rondeau mignon, Op. 77
- Introduction et Variations sur l’Air “Giovinetto cavalier” de l'opéra Il Crociato in Egitto de G. Meyerbeer, Op. 79 [alternate title, Impromptu sur un air favori de l'opéra Il crociato in Egitto]
- Exercises en forme de valses, Op. 80
- Rondino sur l'air de Don Juan, Giovinette che fate, Op. 81
- Ricordanza nell’Opera Il Crociato in Egitto di G. Meyerbeer, Op. 82
- “Finch’han dal vino” de l’opéra Don Juan de W. A. Mozart, rondo capriccioso, Op. 83
- Rondo brilliant, Op. 84
- Sonata in E♭ major, Op. 85, “Hommage à J. B. Cramer” (1826)
- Robin Adair, célèbre air écossais intercallé dans l’opéra La Dame blanche d’A. Boieldieu, varié, Op. 87
- Mélange sur des Motifs favoris de l’opéra Faust de L. Spohr, Op. 88
- Choeur des Chasseurs de Lützow de C. M. de Weber, Op. 90
- Mélange sur des motifs favoris du Siège de Corinthe de G. Rossini, Op. 91
- Variation über ein beliebtes englisches Lied, Op. 93 [alternate title, We're a nodding]
- Rondino on the Ranz des vaches d'Appenzell of Meyerbeer, Op. 94
- Ballade écossaise variée, Op. 96
- Bibiana overture, Op. 98
- God save the king, varié, Op. 101 [alternate title, Hommage au célèbre Clementi]
- 2 brillante Märsche (F major, E♭ major), Op. 103
- Weber's celebrated Valse au chalet, Op. 104 [alternate title, Der Reigen (La Valse au Chalet), rondo sur la romance de Weber]
- Brilliant rondo on the favorite air 'Hurrah for the bonnets of blue,' Op. 106 [alternate title: Souvenirs de Londres]
- Rondo à la polacca in D minor, Op. 107
- Caprice brilliant sur une tarantelle favorite napolitaine, Op. 108
- Fantaisie composée sur la dernière pensée musicale de Weber, Op. 109 [alternate title: Fantasia on C.M. von Weber's celebrated waltz]
- Fantaisie et variations sur des thèmes favoris de La Straniera, opéra de Bellini, Op. 110
- Variations brillantes sur un thème original, Op. 112 [also versions for piano four-hands and for two pianos] (c. 1830; republished in 1838)
- Fantaisie sur la Tyrolienne de Guillaume Tell, Op. 113
- La fiancée suisse, Op. 114 [alternate title, Le Garçon suisse, variations]
- Caprice dramatique: scène de la Cavatine de Robert le diable, Op. 116
- Variations brillantes sur un thème favorite de l'opéra Le templier et la juive de H. Marschner, Op. 119
- Les trois clochettes, rondo, Op.120
- Trois Airs allemannes, Op.124
- Second caprice dramatique sur des motifs de Ludovic, Op. 125
- Impromptu sur des motifs du Revenant de J.M. Gomis, Op.127
- Fantaisie avec variations sur un duo de L'eclair de Halevy, Op.133
- Souvenir de Tradate: nocturne et variations sur un motif favori de La pazza per amore, opéra de Coppola, Op. 135
- Fantaisie sur des motifs de l'opéra La vestale de Mercadante, Op. 141
- Toccata, Op. 147
- Valse du couronnement [without opus]

=== Piano four hands ===
- Trois marches, Op. 11
- Trois polonaises, Op. 16
- Sérénade, Op. 43
- Sonata, Op. 51
- Ouverture de l'opéra, Le retour du monarque, Op. 69
- Grande marche héroïque, composée à l’Occasion du Sacre de S. M. Charles X, Op. 78
- Valses suivies d'une bataille, Op. 91
- Grand sonata, Op. 92
- Nocturne, Op. 99
- Fantaisie dramatique sur des motifs des Huguenots de Meyerbeer, Op. 131
- Grand caprice dramatique sur les Huguenots de Meyerbeer, Op. 131

=== Two pianos ===
- Rondo hongrois, Op. 33
- Fantasie brilliant sur un Thème original, Op. 111

== Chamber music ==
=== Strings ===
- Piano quartet, Op. 4
- 3 String quartets, Op. 7
- Sonate pour le piano-forte et violon obligé, Op. 14
- Sonate pour le piano-forté avec accompagnement de flûte ou violon, Op. 17
- String Quintet in C major, Op.23
- Sonate pour le piano-forte et violon obligé, Op. 24
- Grand duo concertant for piano and violoncello, Op. 30
- Variations concertantes sur la Clémence de Titus for violin and piano, Op. 32
- Pot-pourri pour guitare et piano, Op. 53 [this opus number also used for a rondo for piano]
- 3 String Quartets, Op.69
- Piano Trio in E♭ major [First Grand Trio], Op. 75 (published in 1825; dedicated to Johann Nepomuk Hummel)
- Piano Trio [Grand Trio], Op. 83
- Piano Trio in F major [Second Grand Trio], Op. 86 (1827; dedicated to Louis Spohr)
- Adagio et rondo concertants pour piano et violon, Op. 89
- Notturno sull’Assedio di Corinto (cello and piano), Op. 92
- Piano Trio in B minor [Third Grand Trio], Op. 95 (1828?; dedicated to August Klengel)
- Duo concertant in D minor, Op. 97 (violin and piano)
- Piano Quintet in D minor, Op. 99 (with contrabass) (1827; dedicated to Sigismond Thalberg)
- Thema mit Variationen in A major, Op. 105 (violin and piano)
- Piano Trio in E♭ major [Fourth Grand Trio], Op. 118 (1832?; dedicated to "Madame Louise et Messieurs les frères Bohrer")
- Piano Trio in C major [Fifth Grand Trio], Op. 129 (1836; dedicated to Felix Mendelssohn)
- Piano Trio in F♯ minor [Sixth Grand Trio], Op. 139 (1839?; dedicated to Clara Wieck)
- Piano Trio in D minor [Seventh Grand Trio], Op. 147 (c1845; dedicated to George Osborne)
- Bolero concertant, Op. 148 (violin and piano or violoncello and piano)
- Duo concertant sur un motif Allemand, Op. 149 (violin and piano)

=== Winds ===
- Sonate pour le piano-forté avec accompagnement de flûte ou violon, Op. 17
- Grand Sonata, Op. 35 (oboe or flute or violin and piano)
- Potpourri for flute and piano, Op. 43
- Flute sonata, Op. 61
- Flute sonata, Op. 62 [alternate title: Grand sonata]
- Introduction and Rondo in A major (flute and piano), Op. 102

== Orchestra, including concertos ==
- Symphony, Op. 5
- Grandes variations militaires for two pianos and orchestra, Op.66 [also version with string quartet]
- Concertino for piano and orchestra in E♭ major, Op. 68 (1824–25)
- Grand concerto [piano], Op. 100 (1826)
- Fantaisie militaire, für Klavier und Orchester, Op. 121 (1833)

== Opera, Ballet ==
- Almazinde oder Die Höhle Sesam (Vienna, 1820)
- Der Zauberspruch (Vienna, 1822)
- Bibiana oder Die Kapelle im Walde (Aachen, 1829)
- Die Sprache des Herzens (Berlin-Königstadt, 1836)
