= James Adair =

James Adair may refer to:

- James Makittrick Adair (1728–1802), Scottish doctor practising in Antigua
- James Adair (historian) (1709–1783), Irish historian of the American Indians
- James Adair (serjeant-at-law) (c. 1743–1798), English Whig M.P. for Cockermouth and, subsequently, Higham Ferrars
- Jimmy Adair (1907–1982), American baseball infielder, manager and coach
- James Adair (fl. 2000s–2010s), American member of the band Dolorean
