= Forrest Adair =

Real estate dealer

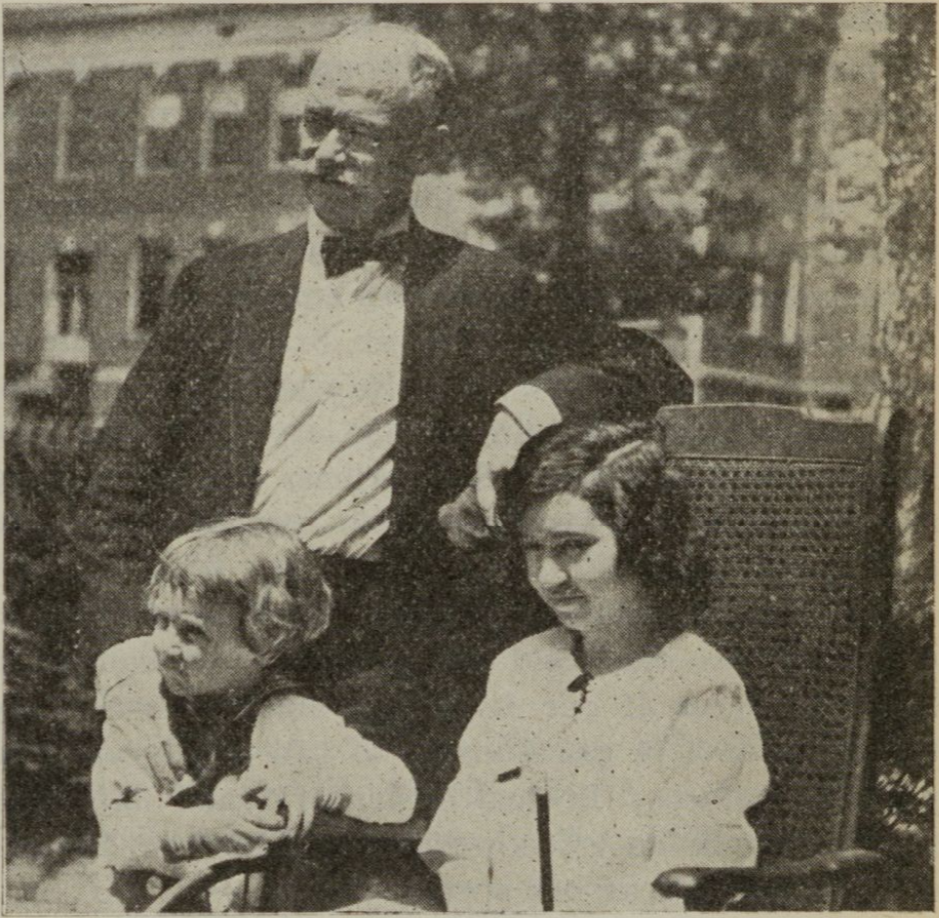
Forrest Adair (standing), 1922

Forrest Adair (1865 – 1936) was a real estate dealer. He was the son of real-estate and streetcar developer Col. George Washington Adair and lived in Atlanta, Georgia He served as Fulton County (Georgia) Commissioner from 1895 until 1903. A member of the Yaarab Temple, he served as Potentate and was instrumental in the founding of the Scottish Rite Children's Hospital and the Shriners Hospitals for Children. Along with his brother, George Adair, Jr., he developed neighborhoods throughout what is the Atlanta, Georgia, area, including Adair Park, West End Park (now known as Westview), and, in conjunction with Asa Candler, Druid Hills.

== See also ==
- Forrest Adair's 1920 "Bubbles" speech calling for the establishment of Shriners Hospitals for Children.
