= Devin Adair =

American director

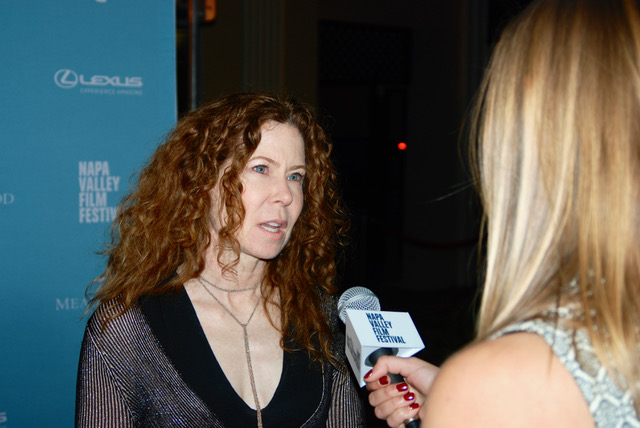
- Adair in 2018
- Citizenship: American
- Occupations: Writer, director, producer

Devin Adair is an American writer, director and producer. She has produced three independent films: Break Point (2014), Betting on Zero (2016) and Grace (2018). Adair wrote, directed and produced Grace, which was acquired by Showtime and Fox International and won numerous awards in a limited festival run, including Best First Time Director at the London Independent Film Festival.

Adair is best known as the author of The Challenge, her memoir about her experiences as the first female coxswain on the Harvard Men’s Heavyweight Crew team. While at Harvard, Adair coxed one of the greatest crews in Harvard's history, winning The Grand Challenge Cup at the Henley Royal Regatta, a feat that has not been accomplished by a college crew since. She and her crew have been inducted into the Harvard Varsity’s Club Hall of Fame. Adair is a trustee of the USRowing Foundation.

== Early life ==
Adair grew up in Boston and first starting coxing crew in high school at Phillips Academy. Her junior year, she switched from coxing from the girls to the boys' team. Harry Parker, the legendary Men's Crew Coach at Harvard, recruited Adair, assuring her she would be welcome on the Men’s team, an unusual move at a time when most men’s crew teams did not allow women coxswains. Her freshman year at Harvard, Adair coxed the First Frosh crew to an undefeated season culminating in winning The Ladies Plate at the Henley Royal Regatta. Adair coxed the Varsity crew her sophomore year, junior and senior year. Adair majored in English at Harvard, and in her senior year, starting writing about her experiences on the crew team as an independent study.

== Career ==
Adair produced Break Point, starring Jeremy Sisto, J. K. Simmons and Amy Smart, which premiered at SXSW. Next, she produced Betting on Zero with Glen Zipper, directed by Ted Braun, which premiered at Tribeca and then wrote, directed and produced Grace.

== Filmography ==
Year	Title	Producer	Writer	Director	Thanks
2010	Growth	No	Yes	No	No
2014	Break Point	Yes	No	No	No
2014	Emoticon ;)	Yes	No	No	No
2016	Betting on Zero	Yes	No	No	No
2018	Grace	Yes	Yes	Yes	No
2024	Exhibiting Forgiveness	No	No	No	Yes
