= George W. Adair Jr. =

American real estate developer (1874–1921)

- Born: 1874; Atlanta, Georgia, U.S.
- Died: November 5, 1921; Atlanta, Georgia, U.S.
- Occupation: Real estate developer
- Spouse: Sarah Glenn (m. 1897)
- Father: George Washington Adair

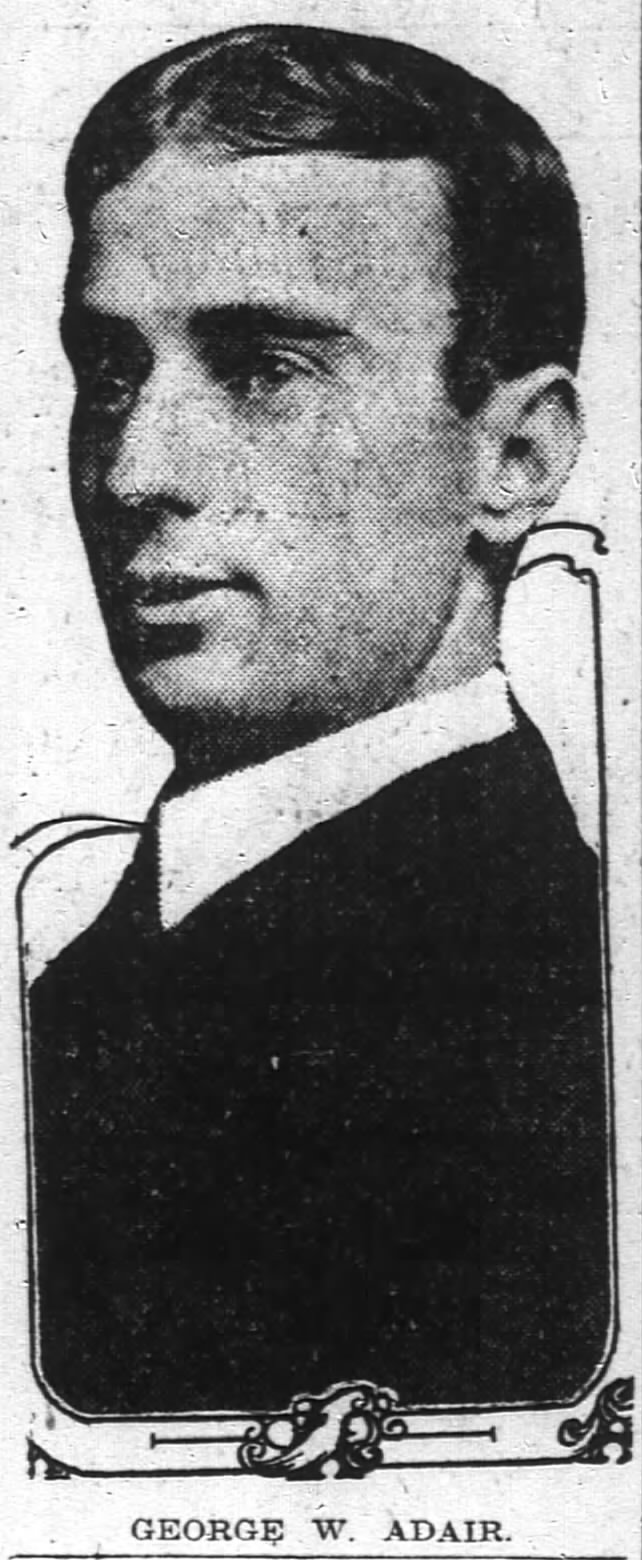
Adair pictured in his Atlanta Constitution obituary November 5, 1921

George Washington Adair Jr. (1874 – November 5, 1921) was the son of Col. George Washington Adair, an important developer of real estate in Atlanta and of the Atlanta streetcar system. Adair Jr. also worked in real estate development in partnership with his brother Forrest, and together they developed today's historic neighborhoods such as Adair Park, West End Park (now known as Westview), and, in conjunction with Asa Candler, Druid Hills. He married Sarah Glenn in 1897. Adair was the second president of the Atlanta Athletic Club and was instrumental in building the East Lake Country Club (now East Lake Golf Club). Known as the Father of Golf in Atlanta, he helped mentor Bobby Jones. His own son, Perry Adair, was a champion golfer and is a member of the Georgia Golf Hall of Fame.
