= Edgar Johnston =

Australian flying ace

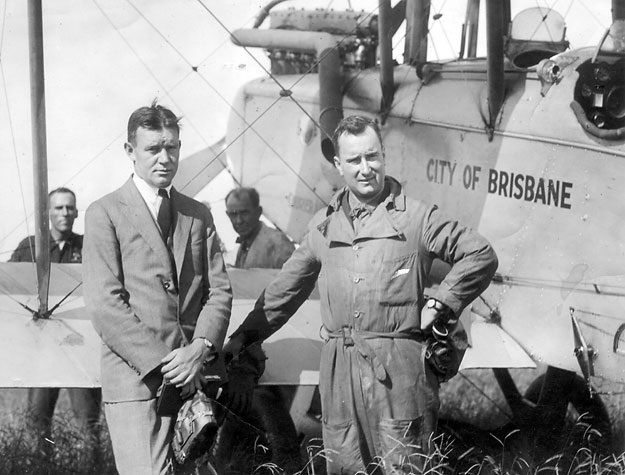
- Johnston (left) with Ron Adair, circa 1926
- Born: 30 April 1896; Perth, Western Australia
- Died: 22 May 1988 (aged 92); Malvern, Victoria
- Known for: International advisor Qantas (1955–67); Assistant Director-General of the Department of Civil Aviation (1939–55); Controller-General of the Civil Aviation Board (1936–39); Controller of Civil Aviation (1933–36)
- Awards: Distinguished Flying Cross
- Aviation career
- Air force: Royal Air Force
- Battles: First World War
- Rank: Captain

Edgar Charles Johnston, DFC (30 April 1896 – 22 May 1988) was an Australian fighter pilot and ace of the First World War and, later, a leading member in civil aviation in Australia.

== Early life and First World War ==
Johnston was born in Perth, Western Australia, the son of Harry Johnston and Maria Louisa Johnston. His oldest brother was Edward Johnston. He started studying at the University of Western Australia in 1914, but then enlisted in the Australian Imperial Force in 1915. After serving with his unit in Gallipoli, he joined the Royal Flying Corps in 1917. Some of his training was in Oxford, where he was quartered at Exeter College. He initially flew with No. 24 Squadron, but later transferred to No. 88 Squadron, flying Bristol Fighters.

He shot down 20 German aircraft (7 solo and 1 shared destroyed, 11 solo and 1 shared 'out of control') between his entry into the war and the war's end in 1918, making him the eighth highest-scoring Australian pilot of the war. In late 1918, he was awarded the Distinguished Flying Cross for a particularly brave patrol in which he defeated two superior German flights.

== Civil aviation ==
After the war, Johnston returned home in 1919, and in 1921 married Margaret Allison Maitland, daughter of Andrew Gibb Maitland. He started working in the Civil Aviation Branch as planner for aerodromes. In 1929, he was appointed Deputy Controller of Aviation, serving under Horace Brinsmead. When Brinsmead was incapacitated in 1931, Johnston was acting Controller, until he took the office in 1933. He continued to be responsible for Aviation, after 1936 as controller-general and foundation chairman of the Civil Aviation Board, and after 1939 as Assistant Director General of the Department of Civil Aviation.

In 1955, he retired from the Department of Civil Aviation, and took up a post with Qantas until his retirement in 1967. Even after his retirement, his influence and contributions continued.
