= Atlanta Southern Confederacy =

The Atlanta Southern Confederacy was a strongly Democratic Southern newspaper during the American Civil War.

The first issue was February 15, 1859, by Dr. James P. Hambleton. Historian Franklin Garrett explains its quick impact in that Hambleton was a "Fire-eater and his editorials were highly intemperate in tone." But he joined the Confederate Army in May 1861 and sold the paper to C.R. Hanleiter and George W. Adair, who merged it with their Gate City Guardian, keeping the new name. By the time the paper stopped publication in 1865, Hanleiter had been replaced by J. Henley Smith.
