= John Ronald Shafto Adair =

Australian aviator (1893–1960)

John Adair OBE
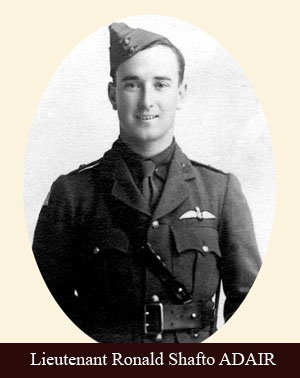
- Born: John Ronald Shafto Adair; 22 May 1893; Maryborough, Queensland, Australia
- Died: 27 June 1960 (aged 67); Ascot, Queensland, Australia
- Other names: Ron Adair
- Education: Maryborough Grammar School
- Occupations: Aviator; army officer; businessman
- Spouses: Rose Ethel Ellis (m. 1919; div. 1930) Bertha Ella (m. 1937)
- Children: 2

John Ronald Shafto "Ron" Adair OBE (22 May 1893 – 27 June 1960) was an Australian aviator, army officer and businessman. In recognition for his service to aviation, Adair was appointed an Officer of the Order of the British Empire in 1955.

== Early life ==
John Ronald Shafto Adair was born 22 May 1893 at Maryborough, Queensland, to a Victorian-born couple, John Hamilton Adair, a surveyor and Constance Ada (née Smith), a homemaker. He was educated at Maryborough Grammar School.

== Career ==
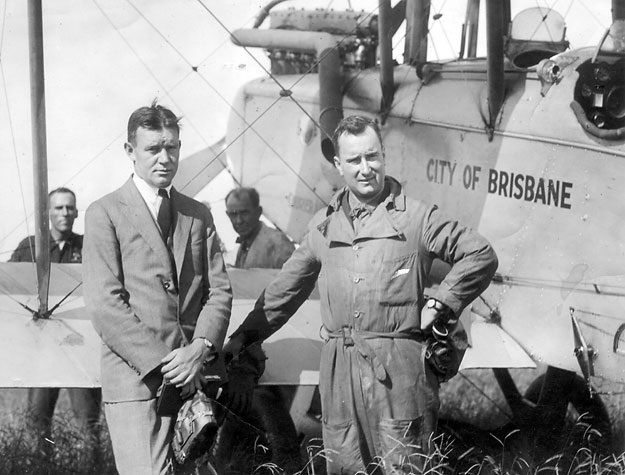
Ron Adair (right) with Edgar Johnston, circa 1926

After completing an engineering apprenticeship, Adair volunteered for World War I and joined the Australian Military Forces, attaining the rank of sergeant. On 21 February 1916, Adair enlisted in the Australian Imperial Force (AIF) and served as a machinist in No. 1 Squadron Australian Flying Corps. Reaching Egypt in April 1916, he was reclassified as an air mechanic seven months later, in November 1916. After the completion of his pilot training in February 1918, Adair rejoined his original squadron members and was subsequently promoted to the rank of lieutenant a month later. On 29 September of the same year, his AIF contract terminated.

Adair displayed exceptional airmanship during his career as a commercial pilot; in 1928, he safely landed an Avro Avian aeroplane even after its engine had fallen out. On 28 March 1928, he founded his first commercial airline, Aircrafts [sic] Pty. Ltd. Adair also founded Queensland Airlines (later part of Ansett-ANA), a freight and passenger airline.

== Personal life ==
On 10 February 1919, while still in the military, Adair married Rose Ethel Ellis at the British Consulate in Cairo. They had one son (Isidore Ronald Shafto Adair 1920–1988). Ellis filed for divorced some time later. On 16 January 1937, he married divorcée Bertha Ella, (née Savery, late Kither), at Saint Andrew's Presbyterian Church in Brisbane.

== Death ==
On 27 June 1960, Adair died of a coronary occlusion-caused heart attack at Ascot, Queensland. He was cremated with Anglican rites.

== See also ==
- Adair (name)
