= Adair Lake =

- Location within California
- Location: Yosemite National Park, Madera County, California
- Coordinates: 37°40′59″N 119°24′27″W
- Type: Lake
- Etymology: Charles F. Adair
- Surface area: 2.94 hectares (7.3 acres)
- Shore length^{1}: 0.79 kilometres (0.49 mi)
- Surface elevation: 9,708 feet (2,959 m)
- ^{1} Shore length is not a well-defined measure.

Adair Lake is a lake within the backcountry of Yosemite National Park, in the Sierra Nevada, Madera County, California.

Adair Lake was named for Charles F. Adair, who stocked the lake with trout in exchange for the naming rights.

== See also ==
- List of lakes in California
