= George Adair =

Real-estate developer

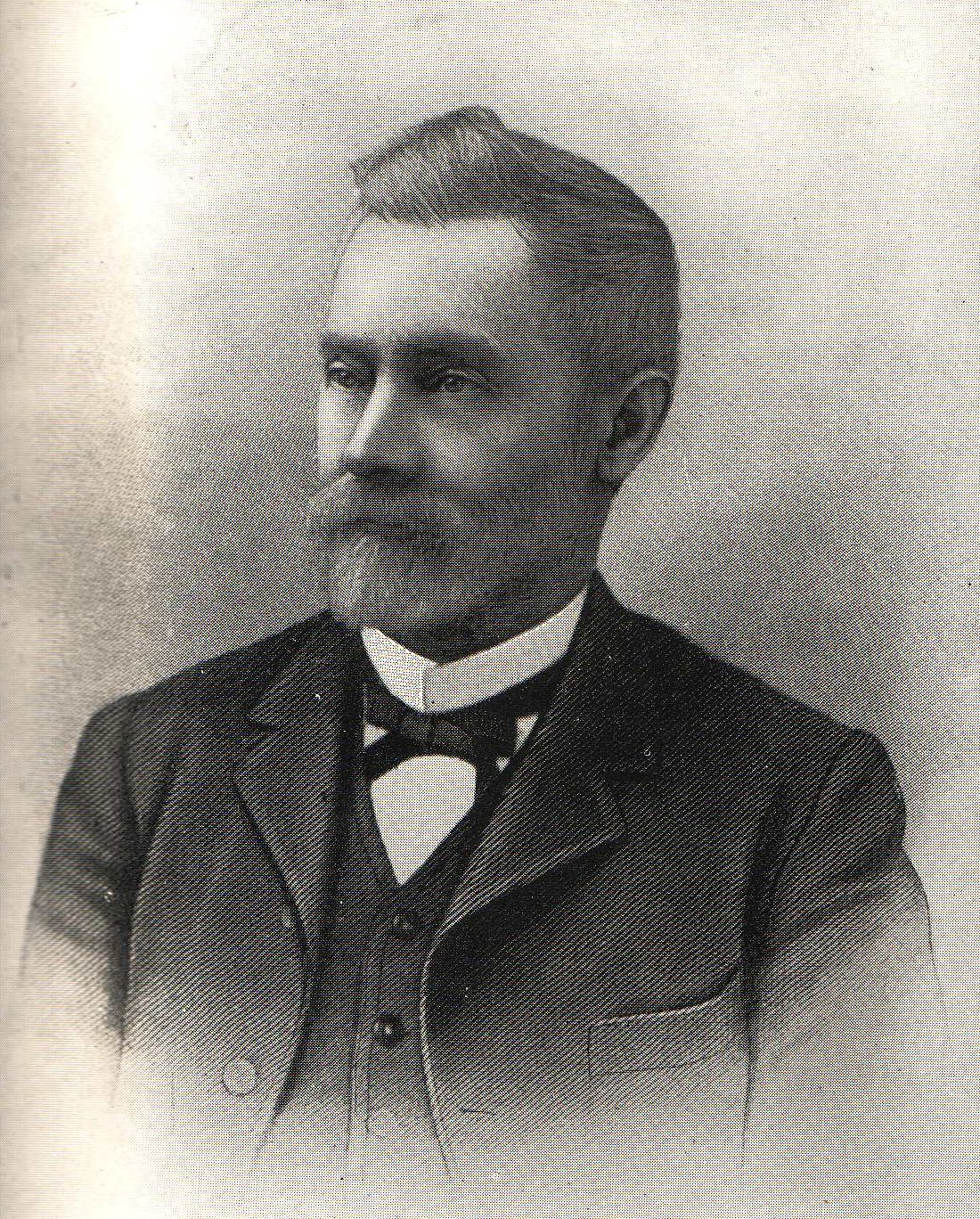
George W. Adair

George Washington Adair (March 1, 1823 – September 29, 1899) was a real-estate developer in post Civil War Atlanta.

== Early life ==
George Washington Adair was born 1 March 1823. He married Mary Jane Perry on 7 Jun 1854, in Newton County, Georgia.

James Calhoun, William H. Dabney, Charles Murphy and Ephraim M. Poole supported him with the means to study at the Decatur Academy. After two years, he took up the study of law in Covington, Georgia, and two years later he was admitted to the bar.

To satisfy his debts, Adair took a position as a conductor on the Georgia Railroad, a job he held for four years. After leaving the railroad, he spent some time at Covington, and Charleston. Adair moved to Atlanta in 1854 at the age of 31 and there established what would be his permanent home.

== Career ==
=== Atlanta ===
Under the firm name of Adair and Ezzard, Adair embarked in the mercantile business, but after not entirely successful two years, he launched into the general trading, auctioning and real estate business, which would engage him throughout the remainder of his career.

During the Civil War, Adair was a newspaperman and a cotton speculator. He already owned the Gate City Guardian newspaper when in 1861 he bought the Atlanta Southern Confederacy and merged the two keeping the name of the latter, assisted by J. Henly Smith. After the paper went under. Adair became an aide on the staff of Gen. N.B. Forrest, serving the confederacy until the end of hostilities in 1865.

=== Post war ===
Adair returned to Atlanta and resumed his real estate business. He began a political career which included positions on the Atlanta City Council and various committees. After co-founding the Atlanta Street Railway Company with Richard Peters in 1871 he began to develop areas at the same time they ran new streetcar lines to serve them: including West End and Adair Park. When the panic of 1873 came on he was compelled to make an assignment of all his property. In 1878, he sold his portion of the streetcar business to Peters.

He started up again, becoming "connected" with the Atlanta Cotton Factory (on the site of the current CNN Center) and the Atlanta Cotton Exposition. He was director of the Kimball House Company, president of the Georgia Western Railroad, and director of the Piedmont Exposition.

In the 1880s, real estate boomed again and with his sons, he established Adair and Company to develop suburban properties. With John W. Grant, in 1881 he developed what would become Stockbridge, Georgia. He also helped raise funds for the rebuilding of the Kimball House after it burned down. Later projects with Kimball failed: the subdivision of Peters Park in 1887 and the establishment of Kimball, Tennessee in 1890 both of which he auctioneered.

== Personal life ==
Adair married Mary Jane Perry on June 7, 1854 in Newton County, Georgia. Adair died at the age of 76, leaving his wife and six children: Jack, Forrest, George, Sallie, Annie, and Mary.

Adair was first cousin to Green B. Adair, another Atlanta real estate developer.

== Sources ==
- New Men, New Cities, New South: Atlanta, Nashville, Charleston, Mobile, 1860-1910 (1990), Don Doyle, University of North Carolina Press, p. 99
