= Adair Park =

Historic residential neighborhood southwest of downtown Atlanta

Coordinates: 33°43′49″N 84°24′38″W

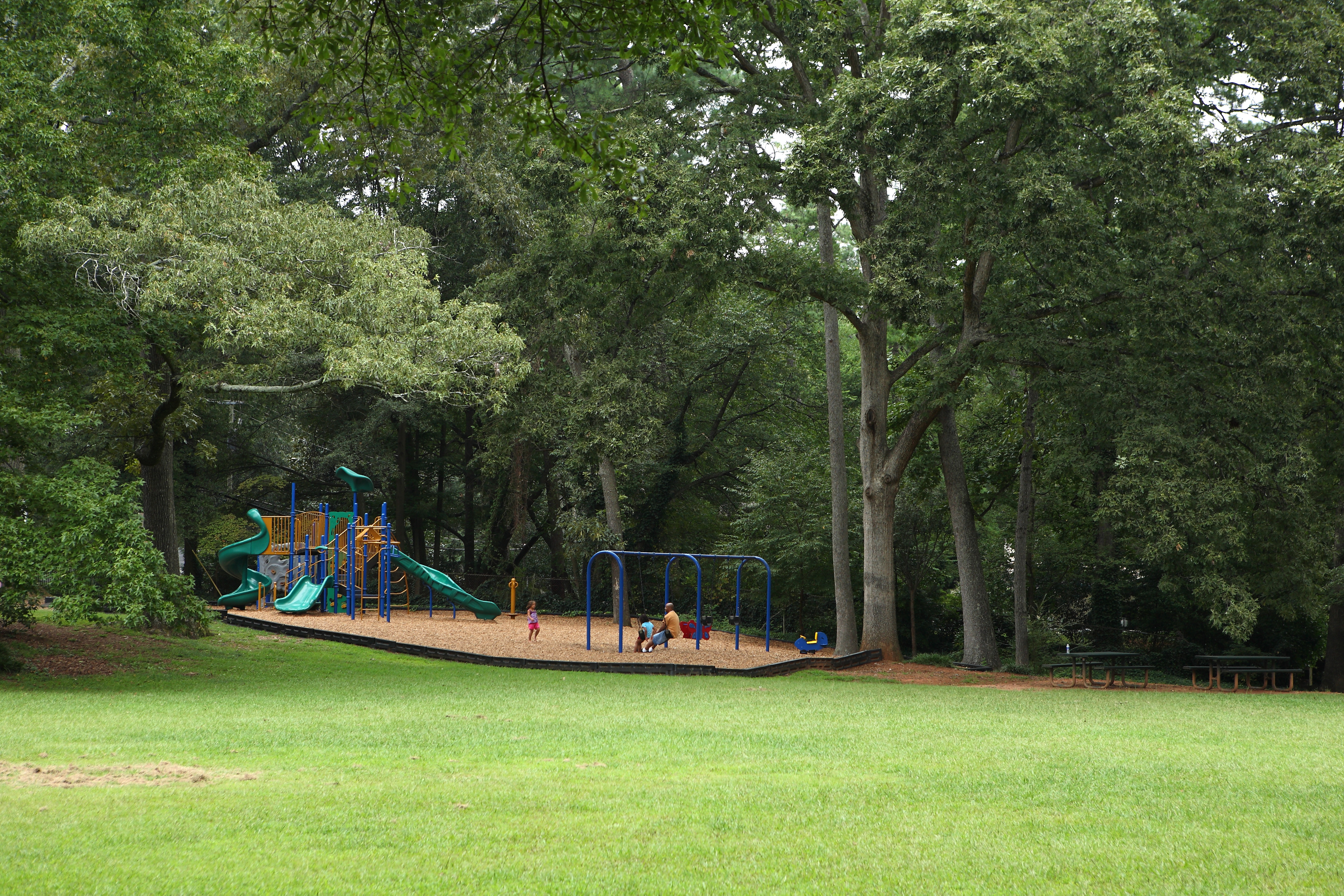
Adair Park playground

Adair Park is a historic residential neighborhood located southwest of downtown Atlanta. It has the form of a left curly bracket, bordered by the MARTA north–south rail line on the northwest, the BeltLine trail on the southwest and Metropolitan Parkway on the east. Historically Adair Park also included the area from Metropolitan Parkway to McDaniel Street on the east, but the city now considers that area part of the Pittsburgh neighborhood.

== History ==
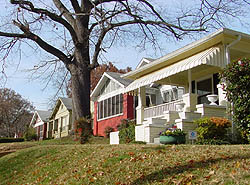
Historic homes in Adair Park

The bungalow suburb was developed from the 1890s to the 1940s, when Atlanta was transitioning from a "railroad town" to an urban area. Shortly after the Civil War, land speculators, notably George Washington Adair, John Thrasher and Thomas Alexander, began purchasing land in this area anticipating future growth. To increase the value of this land, Adair joined with Richard Peters in 1870 to form the Atlanta Street Railway Company to provide horsecar access to the area. He also established the Atlanta Real Estate Company, and continued purchasing land for development. Adair's company became the largest developer of property in Atlanta before he died in 1889. His sons, George and Forrest, continued the company, and began designing the Adair Park subdivision and selling lots in 1910. Adair Park developed into a small white working-class neighborhood of modest houses.

By the 1950s Adair Park was surrounded on all sides by neighborhoods that either always were or had transitioned to majority-black. In 1955 white flight began, triggered by the sale of a single property on Beryl Street near Dewey Street to a black family. Soon Dewey, Hope and Beryl Streets had transitioned from white to black, as did Mayland Avenue and Mayland Circle in 1958. Supported by the West Side Mutual Development Committee (WSMDC), which Mayor Hartsfield had formed to block or manage racial transitions in Atlanta neighborhoods, the Adair Park Civic Club attempted to pool white community resources to repurchase houses and keep white areas white, but there was not enough support compared to those white residents who wished to sell and the transition continued. In 1969, the Georgia grand dragon of the United Klans of America was elected as the Adair Park Civic Club's vice chairman. A day later he, along with black real estate agent Johnny Cornelius Johnson, were elected to policy positions in Atlanta's federally sponsored Model Cities Program.

In the latter half of the 20th century, Adair Park gradually slid into decline along with the Metropolitan Parkway corridor. But by the 2000s, revitalization, property values, demand, and diversity gradually increased due to young professionals beginning to move back into the neighborhood, settling alongside many lifelong residents, attracted by the charming, affordable bungalows and community spirit. Also since 2000, revitalization efforts in southwest Atlanta brought back more economic development to the area such as MET Atlanta and Bearings Bike Works.

== Neighborhood ==
Similar to neighboring West End, the predominant house type within the neighborhood is the bungalow with American Craftsman style detailing. Other architectural styles represented include Folk Victorian, Queen Anne, and English Vernacular Revival. There are also several apartment buildings within the district. Lots are typically 50' x 200' including dedicated driveways and access to rear yards. Landscaping is informal with grass yards, mature trees and shrubs. There are sidewalks, granite curbing, steps from the street to the yards, and retaining walls within the district. The few historic commercial buildings are generally one-story freestanding or attached neighborhood stores. Most are constructed of cinder block or brick and feature storefront windows.

Community landmark buildings include The Academy Lofts, The Metropolitan, Stewart Avenue Methodist Episcopal Church South, Adair Park Baptist Church, and Create ATL.

The George W. Adair School, constructed in 1912, is a two-story red brick building designed in the Academic Gothic Revival style. In 2017, renovations began to convert the former school into "The Academy Lofts" after sitting vacant for approximately 45 years. The renovation features "35 affordable micro-units reserved for artists", over 5,000 sq. ft. loft space for small businesses, a coworking space, and a coffee shop.

MET Atlanta, a 100+ year old former warehouse complex, has turned into a modern "intown business and arts district" of loft and studio space, occupying a quarter-mile block at the north end of the neighborhood. In September 2024, Atrium Health purchased MET Atlanta for $70 million. There are several other thriving businesses along Murphy Ave and Metropolitan Pkwy in the neighborhood.

== Parks ==
There are three parks in Adair Park. The first recreational park in the district was established in 1922. Adair Park I comprises 20 lots originally designated for houses that were not sold due to the sloped topography and swampy ground. Landscaped with open areas, mature trees, brick walkways, and a playground, the park has on its grounds a one-story brick bathhouse built in 1930. This park is generally used for neighborhood gatherings, informal pick-up games, and walking. The second park in the district was established in the 1980s on a large parcel of land that was once a lumberyard. Adair Park II features a recreational baseball field, a covered basketball court, tennis courts, and a playground. The third park is Bonnie Brae Park, a .19-acre garden park.

== Neighborhood Association ==
The official neighborhood association of Adair Park is Adair Park Today, Inc., a 501(c)3 non-profit corporation representing the interests of all property owners and residents in the neighborhood. Regular events include the annual Porches and Pies Festival, monthly Porch Parties, neighborhood clean-ups and monthly neighborhood association meetings.
