= Eleanor R. Adair =

American scientist

Eleanor Reed Adair
- Born: Eleanor Campbell Reed; November 11, 1926; Arlington, Massachusetts, U.S.
- Died: April 20, 2013 (aged 86); Hamden, Connecticut, U.S.
- Education: Mount Holyoke College (B.A.); University of Wisconsin-Madison (Ph.D.)
- Known for: Proponent of microwave radiation safety.
- Spouse: Robert K. Adair
- Children: 2
- Scientific career
- Fields: Physiology
- Workplaces: John B. Pierce Laboratory; Air Force Research Laboratory

Eleanor Reed Adair (November 11, 1926 – April 20, 2013) was an American physiologist who studied the effects of electromagnetic radiation on humans. She is best known for performing the first human studies demonstrating the safety of microwave radiation.

== Personal life ==
Adair was born on November 28, 1926, in Arlington, Massachusetts. She received her undergraduate degree from Mount Holyoke College in 1948. She married Robert K. Adair, a physicist, in 1952. In 1955, she obtained her doctorate from the University of Wisconsin–Madison. She received her Ph.D. in a combination of two fields: sensory psychology and physics.

== Scientific work ==
Starting in the 1970s, Adair conducted physiology studies as a fellow at the John B. Pierce Laboratory in New Haven, Connecticut to learn how humans and animals react to heat. This work led her to focus on the controversial area of microwaves and their effect on human health. Experimenting first on squirrel monkeys and then on human volunteers, she concluded that microwave radiation from microwave ovens, cells phones, and power lines is harmless to humans and animals.

In 1996, she joined the U.S. Air Force Research Laboratory at Brooks Air Force Base, Texas, as a senior scientist studying electromagnetic radiation effects.

== Awards and honors ==
Adair was a fellow of several scientific societies, including the Bioelectromagnetics Society and the Institute of Electrical and Electronics Engineers (IEEE). She served as the secretary-treasurer of the former. Adair chaired several IEEE committees, including the Committee on Man and Radiation and the Standards Coordinating Committee. She was a member of the National Council on Radiation Protection and Measurement Committee.

In 2007, she was awarded the D'Arsonval Award for Bioelectromagnetics by the Bioelectromagnetics Society.

== Death ==
Adair died in 2013 due to complications from a stroke.
