= Catherine Steiner-Adair =

American sychologist

- Education: Scarsdale High School; Bowdoin College (BA); Williams College (Exchange Student); Harvard Graduate School of Education (Doctorate in Clinical and Consulting Psychology)
- Occupations: Clinical psychologist; Author; Speaker; Consultant; Research associate at Harvard Medical School
- Years active: 1980s–present
- Employer: Harvard Medical School
- Notable work: The Big Disconnect: Protecting Childhood and Family Relationships in the Digital Age
- Website: www.catherinesteineradair.com

Catherine Steiner-Adair is an American clinical psychologist, author, speaker, consultant, and research associate at Harvard Medical School.

== Education ==
Catherine Steiner-Adair graduated from Scarsdale High School and earned her Bachelor of Arts from Bowdoin College in 1976. She was also an exchange student at Williams College from 1974 to 1975. After Bowdoin, she earned her doctorate in Clinical and Consulting Psychology from the Harvard Graduate School of Education in 1984, where she studied girls' psychological development and education with Carol Gilligan.

== Career ==
Steiner-Adair is an adult star at McLean Hospital and a Clinical Instructor in the Department of Psychiatry at Harvard Medical School. Her clinical and research work focuses on the development, understanding, and prevention of eating disorders in girls. Her other areas of expertise include child development, the impact of culture on gender identity, social relationships, character development, and leadership training.

In 2013, Steiner-Adair released a book called The Big Disconnect: Protecting Childhood and Family Relationships in the Digital Age with Teresa H. Barker. The book examines how technology and media change children's learning and development, and advises parents on balancing the benefits of technology while reducing its risks at each stage of development.

She has spoken in the press about the impact of technology on children.
