= Adair Dyer =

American attorney (1932–2015)

- Born: September 9, 1932; St. Louis, Missouri
- Died: June 11, 2015 (aged 82); Austin, Texas
- Education: University of Texas at Austin; Harvard University

Cromwell Adair Dyer, Jr. (9 September 1932 – 11 June 2015) was an attorney well known for his work in international law. He was formerly the Deputy Secretary General of the Hague Conference on Private International Law. Though his work in private international law ranged from intellectual property, trusts, environmental law, international civil procedure and unfair competition, he was most well known for his contributions to international family law. While at the Permanent Bureau of the Hague Conference, he guided the Hague Abduction Convention through its negotiations and completion. He was also responsible for monitoring the Convention's operation until his retirement from the Permanent Bureau in 1997 after nearly 25 years of service.

On 13 September 1997, a symposium was held in honor of Adair Dyer at the Peace Palace in the Hague. This symposium, entitled "Globalization of Child Law: The Role of the Hague Conventions", was organized by the Faculty of Law of Tilburg University and the International Society of Family Law in collaboration with the Hague Conference on Private International Law.

Adair died on 11 June 2015 in Austin, Texas.
