= John Thrasher (pioneer) =

American city founder (1818–1899)

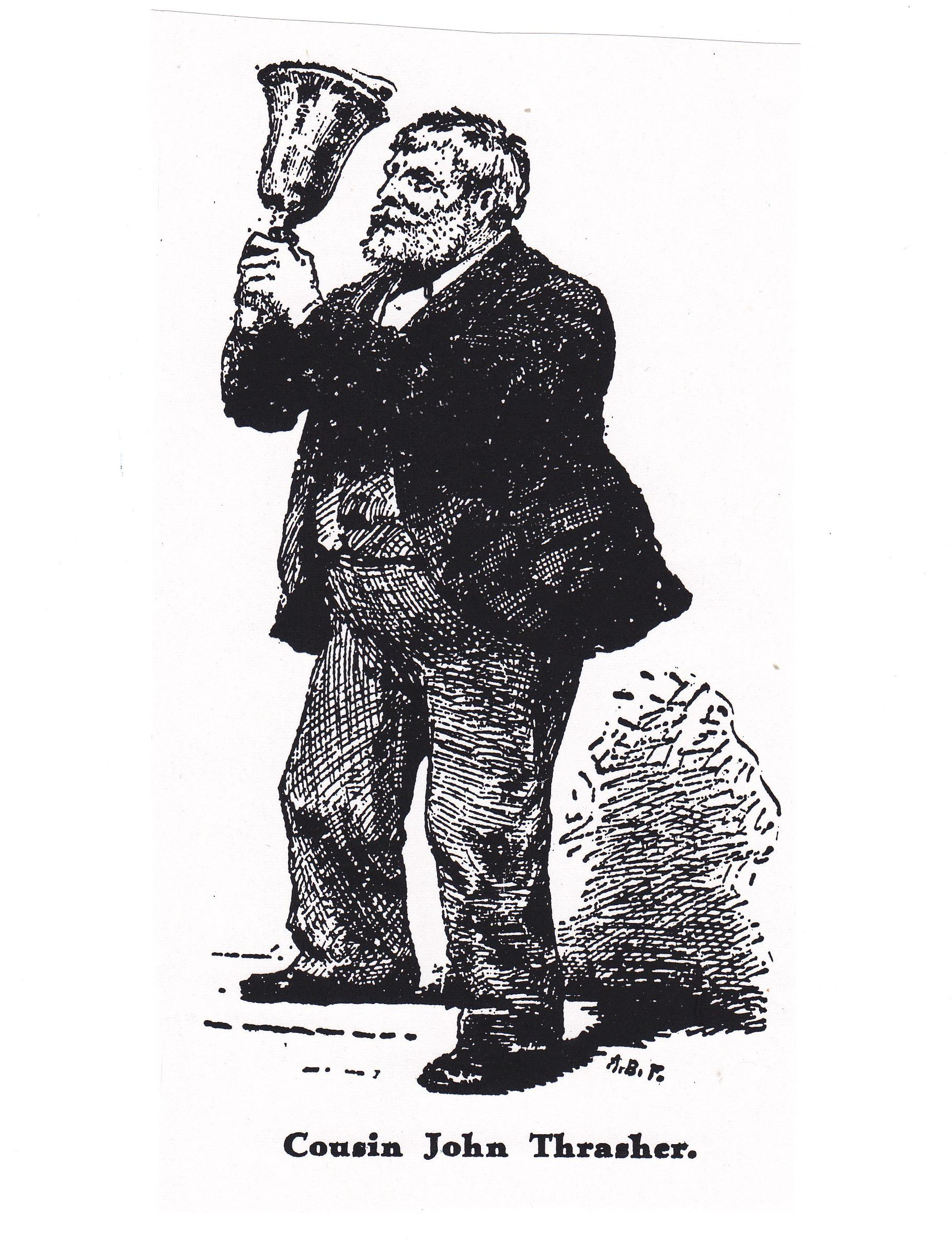
A sketch of John J. Thrasher appearing in an 1879 Harper's magazine article

John Thrasher (February 24, 1818 – November 13, 1899) was the founder of the city of Norcross, Georgia, an original pioneer of Atlanta, and a well-travelled entrepreneur throughout the American Southeast.

== Founding of Atlanta ==
In 1839, Thrasher was hired to do work on the terminus of the Western and Atlantic Railroad. His work crew lived in the area of what is now downtown Atlanta. During the construction Thrasher built homes for his workers and a general store. Nicknamed "Thrasherville" instead of its official name "Terminus" (given by the railroad), it was the first land development of the area. A historical marker of this now stands on Marietta Street, in front of the State Bar of Georgia, just down from where the Philips Arena stands in present times.

Thrasher himself purchased a large amount of land in Whitehall which is now the site of West End, a neighborhood of Atlanta just southwest of the city center. This area was originally supposed to have been the zero-mile marker of the railroad and Thrasher expected enough traffic generated to bring business to the grocery store he built and to spur development on his land. In 1842, Lemuel P. Grant, a railroad employee, donated land just northeast of Whitehall to the railroad and the terminus was moved. Thrasher was so disgusted by this that he sold his land at a significant loss and moved to Griffin, Georgia.

In 1844 Thrasher married and moved back to Atlanta opening another store on Peachtree Street. He became active in local politics and became a state legislator representing Fulton County. It wasn't until after the American Civil War and the destruction of Atlanta that he became deeply involved in Atlanta politics. He was instrumental in opening Atlanta's first jail, its first school, and its streetcars.

== Founding of Norcross ==
In 1870 Thrasher moved northeast of the city along the Richmond and Danville Railroad and founded the town of Norcross, named after Thrasher's good friend, Jonathan Norcross, the fourth mayor of Atlanta. He was also elected the city's first mayor. Thrasher quickly turned Norcross into a vacation destination with a resort hotel he built. He was an active philanthropist in Norcross, a founder of First Baptist Church, a donor of houses to clergy and land for a park, now called Thrasher Park in downtown Norcross. A daily train ran between Norcross and Atlanta, perhaps the first commuter train in Georgia.

== Later life ==
In 1878 his wanderlust struck again and he moved to Central, South Carolina, where he built a restaurant on the train line that went from Atlanta to Washington, D.C. In the late 1880s, Thrasher and his wife followed his sons to Dade City, Florida, where he grew oranges. He never abandoned the railroads however, and was instrumental in bringing the railroads to that town. He died in Dade City on November 13, 1899.

Adding to Thrasher's legacy are Robert and George Woodruff, the great-grandsons of his first cousin, Caroline Thrasher. Robert Woodruff was a famous Atlanta philanthropist and CEO of Coca-Cola from 1923 to 1939.

John J. Thrasher's descendants have established the Thrasher Family Association, which holds an annual reunion and publishes a quarterly newsletter.

== Sources ==
- Atlanta Old and New: Prehistory to 1847
- Norcross, Georgi
