= Fort Adair =

Historical Location In Knoxville, TN

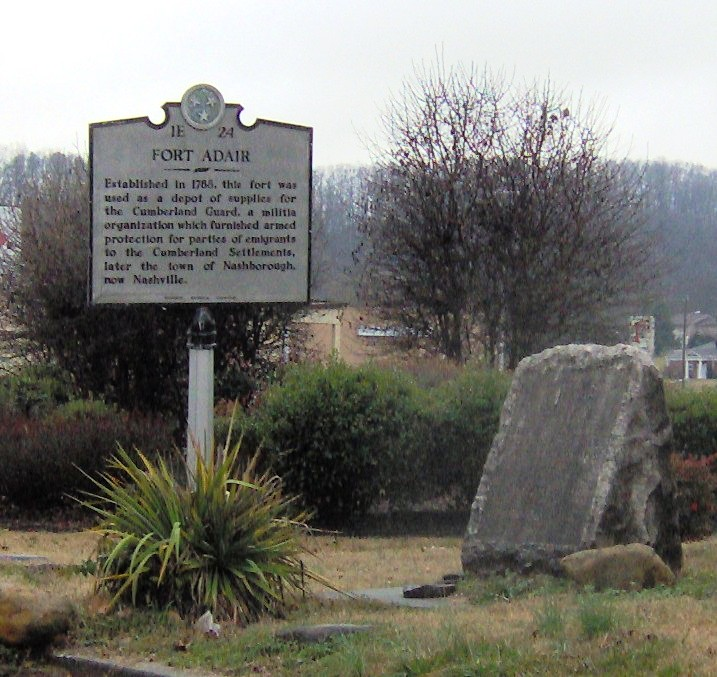
Historical marker and monument near the site of Fort Adair

Fort Adair (sometimes called Adair's Station) was a stockade fortification that served as a supply depot for early settlers migrating west. The structure was constructed in 1788 or around 1791 at Grassy Valley, an early European settlement in the Appalachian Ridge-and-Valley region of East Tennessee. The presence of a supply station encouraged more Europeans to settle in the vicinity. The town of Fountain Head was founded around Fort Adair by settlers of Grassy Valley and later renamed to Fountain City. Since its annexation in 1962, Fountain City is a neighborhood of northern Knoxville, Tennessee.

== History ==
Captain John Adair (1732–1827), a native of County Antrim, Ireland, built Fort Adair either in 1788 or around 1791 at Grassy Valley, Tennessee. The station was intended to provide supplies for westward-bound migrants and to protect them from hostile Cherokee Indians during the years of the Cherokee–American wars. The existence of a supply depot attracted European settlers to the area and contributed to the development of a settlement around the fortification. Nearby springs provided a constant source of fresh water. Fort Adair served as a supply station for the Cumberland Guard and later for the town of Nashborough, which would become modern Nashville. The Cumberland Guard was a militia organization providing armed protection to migrants to the Cumberland settlements, which would later develop into the town of Nashborough.

The present day community of Fountain City began to develop around the supply depot Fort Adair shortly after its completion. Originally named Grassy Valley, the settlement was renamed to Fountain Head and later to Fountain City to avoid confusion with another settlement of the same name. Since its annexation in 1962, Fountain City is a neighborhood of northern Knoxville, Tennessee.

== Location ==
Fort Adair was located in the Appalachian Ridge-and-Valley region of East Tennessee, which is characterized by long, narrow ridges in a northeast-southwest direction. The exact location of the supply depot is unknown, but research indicates that it could have been located in the vicinity of the modern Lynnhurst Cemetery, near the confluence of Adair Creek and First Creek. Adair and his wife are buried at the top of a hill in the northeast section of the cemetery.

The historical marker erected by the Tennessee Historical Commission and the monument placed at the location by the Daughters of the American Revolution are located at U.S. Route 441 at the intersection of Broadway and Sanders Lane in Knox County at coordinates 36°01′34″N 83°55′38″W.

== See also ==
- List of Forts (Tennessee)
