= Sadie Bay Adair =

American physician

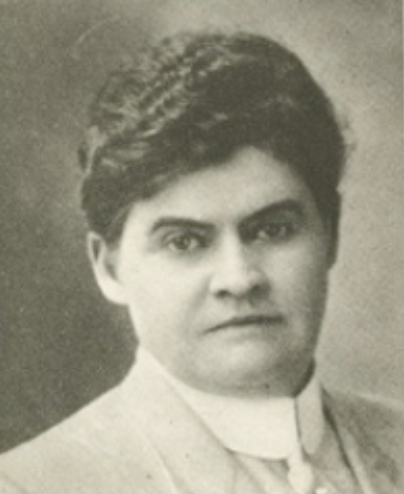
- Sadie Bay Adair, from a 1922 publication
- Born: Sadie Bay; August 11, 1868; Hays City, Kansas, U.S.
- Died: January 16, 1944 (age 75)
- Occupation: Physician
- Known for: President, American Medical Women's Association

Sadie Bay Adair (August 11, 1868 – January 16, 1944) was an American physician based in Chicago. She was president of the American Medical Women's Association's predecessor organization, the Medical Women's Club of Chicago, and editor of the association's journal. She was also a member of the Chicago Board of Education from 1917 to 1922.

== Early life and education ==
Adair was born in Hays, Kansas, and raised in Buena Vista, Colorado, the daughter of John M. Bay and Wilmet Hall Bay. She graduated from Creighton Medical College in Omaha, Nebraska, in 1902.

== Career ==
Adair was on the staff of the Chicago Municipal Tuberculosis Sanitarium in 1919. She was elected president of the American Medical Women's Association's predecessor, the Women's Medical Club of Chicago, and was editor of the association's journal for 25 years. In 1914 she served on the first all-women medical jury, giving verdicts on 22 cases at the Chicago Psychopathic Hospital. In 1919 she was elected to membership in the American Public Health Association. She was an officer of the Chicago Medical Society, and served on the board of governors of the Woman's Century Club.

Adair was appointed to the Chicago Board of Education in 1917. She took special interest in the construction of a girls' technical high school, and helped to establish an open-air kindergarten in the city. She promoted sports for girls, especially rugby: "There is no earthly reason why any normal girl cannot compete in any games that her brother does," she commented in 1922. "The claim that men's sports are too strenuous for women is absurd." She also spoke approvingly of shorter skirts, looser clothing, and lighter clothing, as healthful and "sensible" for active young women.

In 1922, Adair resigned from the Board of Education, and was fined $750 for contempt of court, in a power struggle involving the Board, the schools superintendent, and the mayor. In 1923, she was briefly a member of the Davis school board.

== Personal life ==
Sadie Bay and Arthur Byers Adair married in 1892, in Colorado. They had a son, Loren, and they divorced before June 1908. She was struck and injured by a moving van in 1943, and she died in 1944, at the age of 75, in Chicago.
