= Adar (surname) =

Adar is a surname. Notable people with the surname include:

- Jimmy Adar (born 1987), Ugandan middle-distance runner
- Tamar Adar (1939–2008), Israeli writer
- Yasemin Adar (born 1991), Turkish female freestyle wrestler

Fictional characters:

- President Adar, character in the original Battlestar Galactica
- Richard Adar, character in the reimagined Battlestar Galactica
