= Adair County High School =

Adair County High School may refer to:

- Adair County High School (Kentucky), Columbia, Kentucky, US
- Adair County R-II High School, Brashear, Missouri, US
- Adair County R-I High School, Novinger, Missouri, US
