= Adair Hore =

British civil servant (1874–1950)

Sir Charles Fraser Adair Hore KBE (8 November 1874 – 23 January 1950), better known as Sir Adair Hore, was the son of Fraser Salter Hore (born ca.1835), a solicitor, and his wife, Isabelle Mary Anne (born ca.1844, née Dawes), who had married in Bombay in 1864.

He was educated at Merchant Taylors' School, and graduated from St. John's College, Oxford in 1898.

He joined the British Home Civil Service as a Clerk (1st Class) in the Local Government Board in 1898. He transferred to the Ministry of Pensions shortly after it was created in 1916, and eventually became its Permanent Secretary between 1935 and 1941.

In the first quarter of 1912, in Kensington, he married Elizabeth Miriam née Miers (born 1867; died 1936), the widow of Jacob Isaac Belisha (born 1862), the parents of the child who became Leslie Hore-Belisha, 1st Baron Hore-Belisha.

He wrote War and Peace Charities: The Mobilisation of Voluntary Effort for the British Charity Organisation Society in 1916.

He was appointed a Knight Commander of the Order of the British Empire (KBE) in the 1925 Birthday Honours.
