= Fountain City, Knoxville =

Neighborhood in Knoxville, Tennessee

Coordinates: 36°01′55″N 83°56′15″W

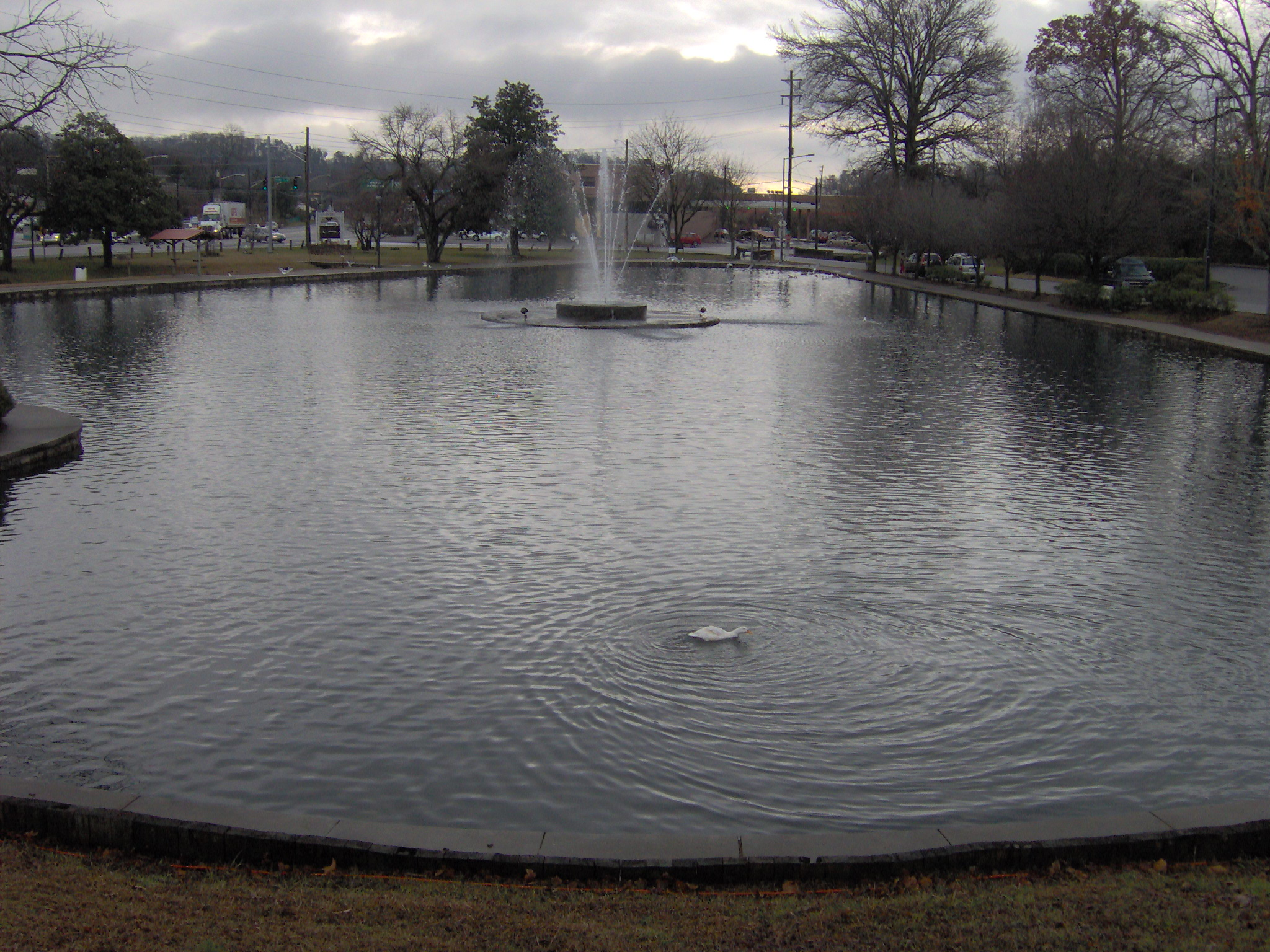
Fountain City Lake

Fountain City is a neighborhood in northern Knoxville, Tennessee, in the southeastern United States. Although not a census-designated place (it is grouped with Knoxville for census-purposes), the populations of the two ZIP codes that serve Fountain City— 37918 and 37912— were 36,815 and 18,695, respectively, as of the 2000 U.S. census. At the time of its annexation by the city of Knoxville in 1962, Fountain City was the largest unincorporated community in the United States.

== Geography ==
Fountain City is located in the Appalachian Ridge-and-Valley region, which is characterized by long, narrow ridges that run in a northeast-southwest direction. The community is "hemmed in" by several such ridges, namely Blackoak Ridge and Beaver Ridge, which divide Fountain City from Halls Crossroads to the north, and Sharp's Ridge, which separates Fountain City from North Knoxville proper to the south. Along with Halls, adjacent communities include Powell, which is opposite Beaver Ridge to the west, Gibbs to the northeast, Beverly to the east, and Whittle Springs to the southeast. Fountain City is drained primarily by First Creek, which rises near the base of Blackoak Ridge and proceeds southward through downtown Knoxville, where it empties into the Tennessee River.

The main road in Fountain City is Broadway, a section of U.S. Highway 441 that connects Fountain City to Halls (where it becomes Maynardville Highway) to the north and downtown Knoxville to the south. Interstate 640 passes along Fountain City's southern boundary, and Interstate 75 passes through the western part of the community. Other important roads include Merchants Drive/Cedar Lane, which connects Broadway to I-75, and Tazewell Pike (part of State Highway 331), which connects Fountain City with Gibbs to the northeast.

== History ==
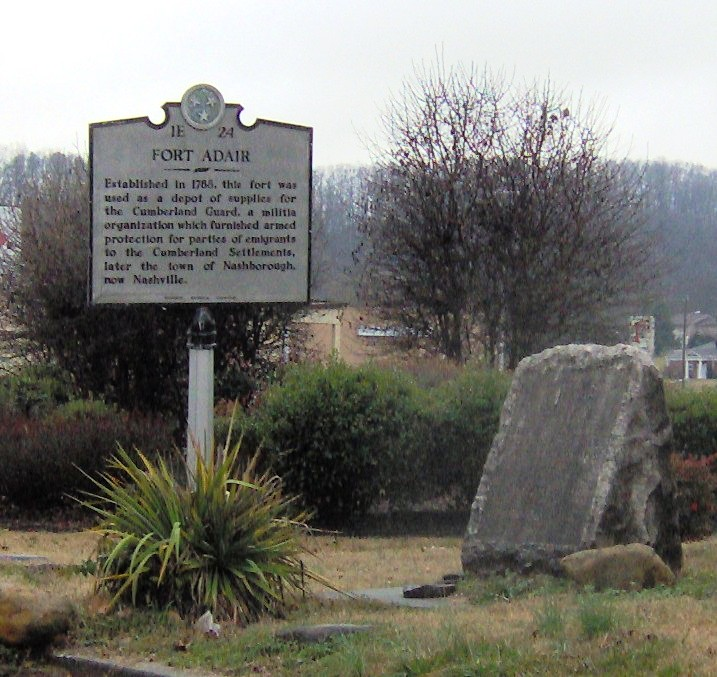
THC marker and DAR monument recalling Fort Adair

European-American settlement in what is now Fountain City began with the completion of Fort Adair (sometimes called Adair's Station), a supply depot built by Captain John Adair (1732–1827) around 1791 to protect westward-bound settlers from the indigenous Cherokee whose land the settlers were invading in the waning years of the Cherokee–American wars. The fort's exact location is unknown, but it was likely located in the vicinity of the modern Lynnhurst Cemetery, near the confluence of Adair Creek and First Creek. Adair and his wife are buried atop a hill overlooking the cemetery.

The community that developed around Fort Adair, originally called "Grassy Valley," eventually became known as "Fountain Head." In the mid-1820s, a circuit rider named E.F. Sevier (a grandson of John Sevier) helped establish the Fountain Head Methodist Church (the predecessor of the present Fountain City United Methodist Church), a meeting house which was completed just north of the Adair holdings in 1828. Within a few years, the Fountain Head Campground had developed on land adjacent to the meeting house, which was fed by a large spring. The campground was a popular place for religious revivals, some of which hosted as many as 2,000 people, until it was moved to the Inskip area (which was closer to the railroad) in the 1880s. Today, the old campground is home to Fountain City Park.

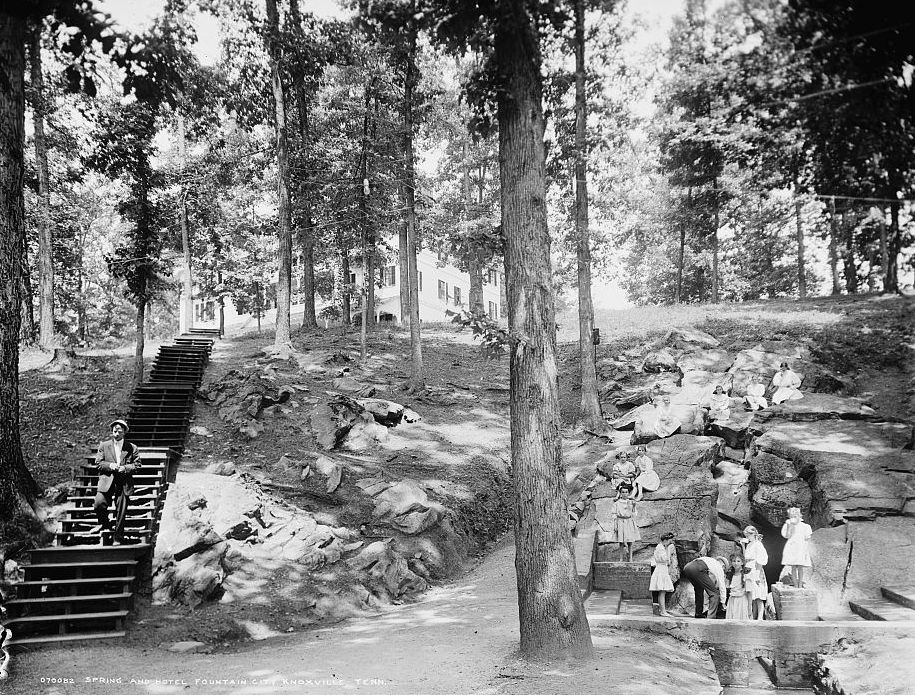
Fountain City spring and hotel, early 20th century

The Fountain Head Campground property was sold to land developers in 1885, and the following year the three-story, fifty-room Fountain Head Hotel was completed, overlooking the campground's spring. With the completion of the hotel, the community began expanding. In 1890, a post office was established, and since the name "Fountain Head" had already been claimed by another town in Tennessee, the community settled on the name "Fountain City." That same year, the heart-shaped Fountain City Lake was completed, and a railroad known as the "Dummy Line" was constructed to connect the community to Knoxville (its southern terminus was at Emory Place). The Dummy Line remained in operation until 1905, when it was replaced by a trolley.

=== The 20th century ===
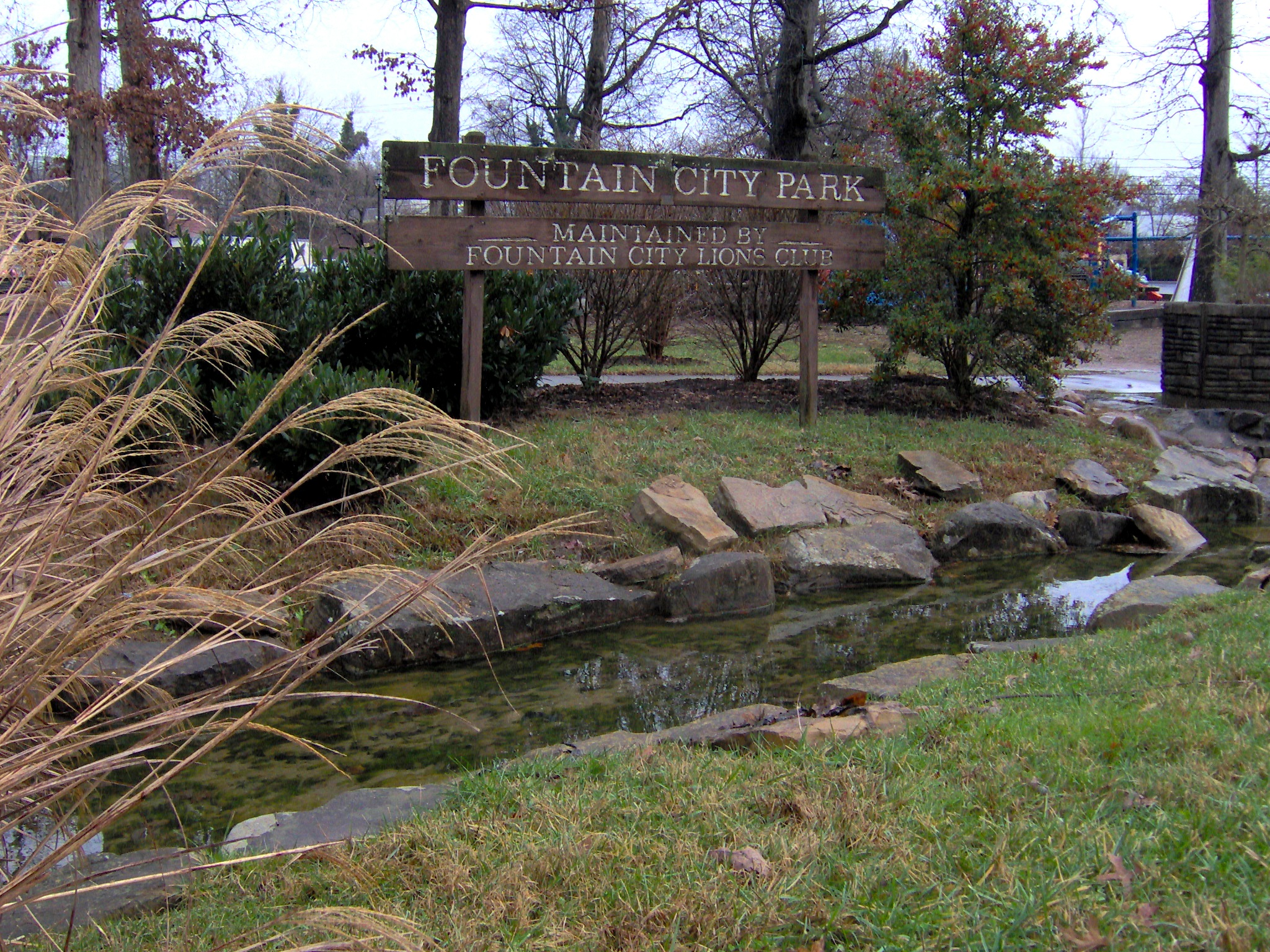
Fountain City Park

In 1893, Holbrook Normal College was established on lands adjacent to the Fountain Head Hotel. Knox County purchased the school (which had come into the possession of the Tennessee Baptist Association) in 1906 for the establishment of Central High School. In 1919, Hassie K. Gresham (1877–1970), a graduate of Holbrook, was named principal of Central High, making her the first female high school principal in the state of Tennessee. She served as Central's principal until 1947, overseeing a nearly tenfold expansion of the size of the school's student body. When Central moved to its new location in 1971, Gresham Middle School that replaced it was named for her.

By the 1950s, Fountain City was home to over 30,000 residents. Knoxville, seeking to expand its tax base and form a metropolitan government, attempted to annex Fountain City in 1959. A mail poll showed that Fountain Citians opposed the annexation by a 10 to 1 margin, and the community filed a lawsuit to block it. After Knoxville made a number of concessions, including a one-year moratorium on city taxes, the lawsuit was dropped. On February 12, 1962, in a ceremony that included a mock funeral for what was deemed the death of Fountain City, the community's leaders handed over a symbolic sword to Knoxville mayor John Duncan.

== Education ==
Along with Central High School and Gresham Middle School, public schools in Fountain City include Shannondale Elementary, Sterchi Elementary, Fountain City Elementary, and Inskip Elementary. Private schools include Nature's Way Montessori and Garden Montessori schools. Fountainhead College of Technology (formerly Smithwood Elementary, then Tennessee Institute of Electronics) was, until recently, located in Fountain City.

== Recreation ==
Fountain City Lake— commonly called the "Duck Pond"— remains one of Fountain City's most prominent features. Parks include Fountain City Park, located on the site of the old Fountain Head Campground, which consists of 12 acres (0.049 km^{2}) situated along the small spring that feeds into First Creek, the Fountain City Ball Park (built in 1954), and the Fountain City Art Center (built originally as a library in 1964).
