= Grace (2018 film) =

- Directed by: Devin Adair
- Written by: Devin Adair
- Produced by: Gabe Cowan; Laure Sudreau; Devin Adair
- Starring: Tate Donovan; Katie Cassidy; Matthew Lillard; Debby Ryan; Mircea Monroe
- Cinematography: Nicholas Wiesnet
- Edited by: Jan Kovac
- Music by: Mandy Hoffman
- Release date: September 23, 2018 (Boston)
- Running time: 101 minutes
- Country: United States
- Language: English

Grace is a 2018 American romantic comedy drama film written and directed by Devin Adair and starring Tate Donovan, Katie Cassidy, Matthew Lillard, Debby Ryan and Mircea Monroe.

== Cast ==
- Tate Donovan as Charlie Elliston
- Katie Cassidy as Dawn Walsh
- Matthew Lillard as Bernie Wexler
- Debby Ryan as Nicole
- Missi Pyle as Liz
- Mircea Monroe as Mia
- Hugo Armstrong as Val
- Ryan Canale as Sam Wexler

== Production ==
Gail Bean and Annie Ilonzeh were attached to appear in the film.

== Release ==
The film premiered at the Boston Film Festival on September 23, 2018. The film was also screened at the Napa Valley Film Festival on November 10, 2018.

== Reception ==
Justin Lowe of The Hollywood Reporter gave the film a positive review and wrote, "Modestly scaled and tightly focused on its lead characters, Adair’s feature offers an authentic perspective on nurturing creativity while maintaining a playful tone that’s both entertaining and endearing."
