= Brian Adair =

Scottish sports administrator (1935–2021)

- Born: 29 May 1935; Hammersmith, London, England
- Died: 1 November 2021 (aged 86)
- Occupation: Sports administrator
- Spouse: Mona Lindsay (m. 1966)
- Children: 2

Brian Adair (29 May 1935 – 1 November 2021) was a Scottish sports administrator. He served as president (1983) and chairman (1986) of the Scottish Cricket Union.

Adair was born on 29 May 1935 in Hammersmith, London. At the outbreak of World War II, his father was posted to Edinburgh, where the family subsequently moved. There he attended George Watson's College, where he excelled at sport, including squash and cricket. In 1966, he married Mona Lindsay, a social worker. Adair died on 1 November 2021, at the age of 86.
