= Adair County =

Adair County is the name of four counties in the United States:

- Adair County, Iowa
- Adair County, Kentucky
- Adair County, Missouri
- Adair County, Oklahoma

== See also ==
- Ada County, Idaho
