= Benjamin Frank Adair =

American politician (1852–1902)

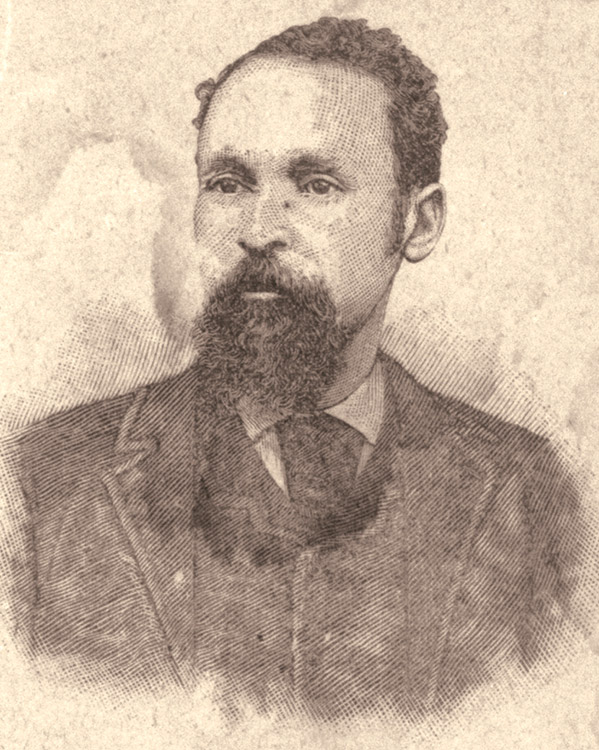
Portrait of Benjamin F. Adair

Benjamin Frank Adair (1852 – March 28, 1902) was a lawyer who served in the Arkansas House of Representatives in 1891 representing Pulaski County.

== Biography ==
Adair's father had the same name and was the owner of his mother. His father moved the family to Oberlin, Ohio, when Arkansas outlawed free people of color (Arkansas's Free Negro Expulsion Act of 1859). The father freed his family. He was included in a photo montage of African American state legislators serving in Arkansas in 1891 published in The Freeman newspaper in Indianapolis. He was a Democrat. Adair died March 28, 1902, from a suspected heart failure after suffering from heart issues.

== See also ==
- African American officeholders from the end of the Civil War until before 1900
