= Hubert Adair =

Royal Air Force World War II pilot

Hubert Hastings Adair
- Born: Hubert Hastings Adair; 17 August 1917; Castleblaney, Republic of Ireland
- Died: 6 November 1940 (aged 23); Widley, Hampshire, England
- Relatives: Robert and Elizabeth Adair (Parents)
- Military career
- Allegiance: United Kingdom
- Branch: Royal Air Force
- Service years: 1936–1940
- Rank: Sergeant
- Nickname: Paddy
- Service number: 580088
- Units: No. 88 Squadron RAF; No. 151 Squadron RAF; No. 213 Squadron RAF
- Conflicts: World War II: Battle of France; Battle of Britain

Hubert Adair (17 August 1917 – 6 November 1940) was an Irish-born pilot in the Royal Air Force during the Second World War. He flew in the Battle of France and in the subsequent Battle of Britain.

== Early life ==
Hubert Hastings Adair was born in Castleblaney in the Republic of Ireland on 17 August 1917, the son of Robert and Elizabeth Adair. He initially went Carrickaslane School but following the death of his father, the Adair family moved to Norwich, in England, and he was educated at the City of Norwich School.

== Royal Air Force ==
Adair joined the Royal Air Force in 1936. After completing his training he joined No. 88 Squadron and flew the Fairey Battle light bomber during the Battle of France. Adair subsequently volunteered for Fighter Command, which had called for volunteers to train as fighter pilots. He converted to Hawker Hurricane fighters in August 1940 and joined No. 151 Squadron at RAF Digby on 4 September 1940 and then was posted to No. 213 Squadron RAF at RAF Tangmere on 16 September 1940.

On 6 November 1940 Adair was killed in action over Southampton while flying Hurricane AK-D (V7602). It is believed that he was shot down by Major Helmut Wick of JG 2. Adair was posted as "missing in action" and was presumed to have come down in the English Channel.

Later research found that Adair's Hurricane, V7602, crashed at Pigeon House Farm, Widley, in Hampshire. When it was excavated on 6 October 1979, the pilot's remains were found and later sent to Portchester Crematorium for disposal.

== Memorials ==
Adair is named on the Air Forces Memorial at Runnymede, Surrey, on panel 11. A memorial plaque, situation on top of Portsdown Hill in Hampshire close to the believed site of Adair's crash. The plaque reads:

SGT. H.H. ADAIR IN HURRICANE AK-D-V7602 CRASHED NEAR HERE ON THE 6/11/1940 WHILST DEFENDING PORTSMOUTH. HE FOUGHT AGAINST SUPERIOR ODDS AND LOST HIS YOUNG LIFE SO THAT FUTURE GENERATIONS COULD ENJOY THEIRS.
