= BEN (song) =

Single by Adair Lion

from the album Michael & Me
- Released: May 1, 2012
- Genre: Hip hop
- Length: 3:49
- Label: Above the Notes
- Songwriter: Adair Lion
- Producer: Adair Lion

Adair Lion singles chronology
"Mr. Blue Sky" (2012)	"BEN" (2012)

"BEN" ("Better Everything Now") is a hip hop song written by rapper, producer, and director Adair Lion (Adair Fragoso), a native of El Paso, Texas. The song samples Michael Jackson's 1972 song of the same name and gives a pro-LGBT message. One report described it as a message to the rap world, and a stance against gay discrimination. Towleroad called it a "beautifully-spun message about doing away with homophobia in hip-hop and Christianity, and accepting gay parents". Originally titled "It Gets Benner" in homage to the It Gets Better Project, Lion decided to use "Ben" with the name also serving as an acronym for "Better Everything Now".

The single was intended to be part of Lion's 2012 tribute album Michael & Me, which was to be released on June 25, 2012, the anniversary of the death of Michael Jackson. Lion's intention was to bring focus to how homophobic expressions, common in the hip-hop community, are part of a larger problem, and that leading voices of hip hop should not turn their backs on their LGBT friends and family. One of the often quoted lyrics is "'Gay is OK' may be the No. 1 thing a rapper shouldn't say."

Equality Texas named Lion an Ally Award winner, recognizing people and businesses that advanced "equality for all Texans", as well as 'Miss West Texas' Kaylee Anne Keith, his former fiancée, who took her platform of "bullying awareness and prevention" to schools across the state.

The popular culture reaction to "BEN" has been surprisingly supportive in the traditionally and notoriously homophobic hip-hop music industry, which, for example, uses "no homo" in lyrics. "BEN" went viral, racking up "tens of thousands of hits" on YouTube, and Lion's songs have increased exposure on "taste-making radio stations and websites". Lion is also doing more live shows including gay pride festivals in Memphis (Mid-South Pride) and his hometown of El Paso.

== Conception and recording ==
Lion, who earned a degree from the University of Texas at Austin in Music with an Emphasis on Vocal Performance and Concentration in Sound Engineering, conceived and wrote the song while researching music for his upcoming full length Michael Jackson tribute album. He found an a cappella version of Jackson's "Ben" and centered that as the main hook, sped up the sample and made a hip-hop beat around the vocals. Ben "wouldn't be shunned" if everyone else knew him, as Jackson puts it, "like I do". Lion noted that in hip hop it is standard to bash gays and that on every rap album he has heard the singers call each other faggot "as the first attack point".

While Lion was in college, a friend of his came out, and it was confusing to him how to react to the news. The issue started to conceptualize how the Ben that Michael Jackson sings of could be seen as LGBT people being the best friends of the hip-hop community. In the movie, and song, Ben is the best friend and the metaphor is touched again when Lion raps "(and) to all the little dudes learning to mack, the hottest chicks got a gay in their clique, remember that." Lion thought of his gay friend and was inspired by the It Gets Better campaign, an Internet-based project founded September 2010 by columnist Dan Savage and his husband Terry Miller in response to an increase of suicide among LGBT youth who were bullied because they were gay or because their peers suspected that they were gay. The goal is to prevent suicide among LGBT youth by having LGBT adults convey the message that the teens' lives will improve. Lion sees "Ben" as a way to being a rap version for the It Gets Better effort.

== Composition ==
Lion has stated, "After choosing the lyrics that most moved me I sped up the sample and made a hip-hop beat around the vocals. I loosely used the kick pattern and song layout of "All Falls Down" by Kanye West." Lion is believed to be the first rapper to quote LGBT activist Harvey Milk, from his "Hope Speech", "I'm Harvey Milk and I'm here to recruit you" to read "Hello, my name is Adair and I'm here to recruit you". The phrase was a play by Milk on the accusation that gay people recruit impressionable youth into their numbers.

The song has a theological message with Lion rhyming "Being Christian, it's hard to say this, the Bible was wrong this time; It's in every species and every family I've met, so I don't see why to the world it's a crime". Although the video is supportive of LGBT people Lion is himself hetero. He considers himself to be a straight ally.

I've had to deal with people calling me "fudgepacker", "gay lover", "homo" ... I just can't imagine how some people have to live their life [being called names] that way. So many people lack compassion. And yet, some people will mistake me for gay but just say, "It's cool". I’m just now realizing these facets.

— Adair Lion

== Critical reception ==
"Ben" was generally well received by music critics. LGBT blogger site Gawker called it the "world’s first pro-gay rap song" created for mainstream consumption. Although homo hop, openly gay hip hop, has been a growing genre, it remains a niche market and largely insular to LGBT communities.

In the lyrics Lion calls out Lil' Wayne, and Ye, a short from Yeezy, a nickname of rapper Kanye West. He was criticized for being a "hater" for doing so but defended his actions and stated that those artists are among his heroes:

They are my idols. My point was that if you have that power of influence over the mass majority—especially in hip-hop—and you're not doing what you can, then the messages continue to be hidden. I was just saying a song like this from the hip-hop community is overdue.

— Adair Lion

== Music video ==
Lion uploaded "BEN - Adair Lion (Texas Rapper Makes "Gay is Okay" Song)", the music video April 30, 2012 to his YouTube channel. The video was shot locally in Amarillo, Texas. In its first week the video has over 156,000. After thirteen days the video was blocked by Universal Music Group and a replacement video not using a modified sample from Jackson was reposted.

In the music video there are many references to the line "queer as a three dollar bill" as a metaphor for homophobic places accompanied by images of a Ben Franklin three-dollar bill, but in the end of the video the bill is accepted [by hip hop] in exchange for rainbow-colored lollipops, a metaphor for acceptance of LGBT people. The name comes from the expression "Queer as a three dollar bill". The Bureau of Engraving and Printing has never been authorized to print a $3 note. However, before the Civil War, banks operating under State charters issued notes of that denomination. These notes were printed by private contractors and were not obligations of the federal government. "Queer as a three dollar bill" dates back to the 1920s and refers to anything strange, suspicious, though it can also refer to homosexual. The image accompanying the single is of a pile of three dollar bills.

Lion noted that despite the video going viral, it was not being shown at most of the sites that had helped popularize his music by posting his earlier videos. A replacement video was posted May 22, 2012 with a note, "this video's predecessor was blocked by UMG after 13 days and 156k views... this is a second version of the music video and does not contain any MJ samples. It is an entirely original piece -composed, written, recorded, mixed and mastered by Adair Lion."
