= Robin Adair =

Song
- Language: English
- Written: 1750s
- Composer: Charles Coffey
- Lyricist: Lady Caroline Keppel

"Robin Adair" is a traditional Irish (sometimes identified as Scottish) song with lyrics written by Lady Caroline Keppel. It was popular in the 18th century. It has a Roud Folk Song Index number of 8918. The song was mentioned by Jane Austen in her 1815 novel Emma; the character Jane Fairfax played it on the piano. The song is also mentioned in Chapter IX of MacKinlay Kantor's Pulitzer Prize-winning novel "Andersonville" (1955).

== Background ==
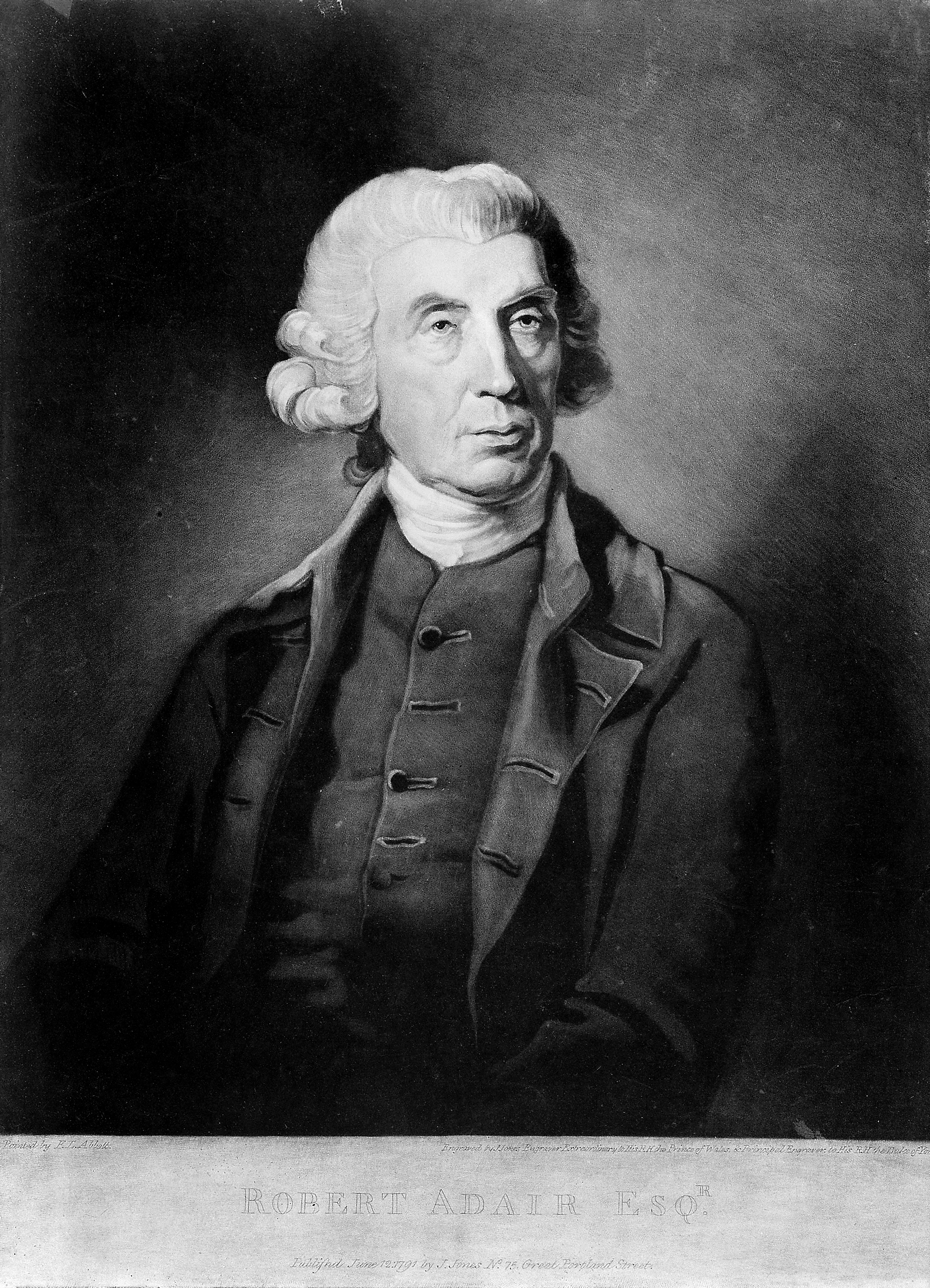
Robert "Robin" Adair, husband of Lady Caroline Keppel

Robert "Robin" Adair was a real person: a surgeon-colonel in the British army, who declined a baronetcy, he was born in Dublin around 1714 and died in 1790. Lady Caroline Keppel (c. 1734–1769), the elder of the two daughters of Willem Anne van Keppel, 2nd Earl of Albemarle, married Adair, despite the fact that her family disapproved of the match because of his lower status. Lady Caroline wrote the song bearing her husband's name during the 1750s as a rebuke to her family for what she perceived as their snobbery regarding her handsome and accomplished lover. Their son, also christened Robert Adair, became an MP and went on to become a distinguished British diplomat, frequently employed on the most important diplomatic missions. The tune to which Lady Caroline's verse was set may have been written by Charles Coffey ("Eileen Aroon," a work by him, features the same melody).

== Lyrics ==
"Robin Adair"
Sung by Geraldine Farrar, 1908

These lyrics were printed in a chapbook of 1823, and G. Schirmer, Inc. sheet music in 1882:

What's this dull town to me?
Robin's not near:
What was't I wish'd to see?
What wish'd to hear?
Where's all the joy and mirth,
Made this town a heaven on earth?
Oh! they're all fled with thee,
Robin Adair.

What made the assembly shine?
Robin Adair.
What made the ball so fine?
Robin was there:
What when the play was o'er,
What made my heart so sore?
Oh! it was parting with
Robin Adair.

But now thou'rt cold to me
Robin Adair,
But now thou'rt cold to me
Robin Adair:
Yet him I lov'd so well,
Still in my heart shall dwell;
Oh! I can ne'er forget
Robin Adair.

A further three verses may comprise a later addition.

Welcome on shore again,
Robin Adair!
Welcome once more again,
Robin Adair!
I feel thy trembling hand;
Tears in thy eyelids stand,
To greet thy native land,
Robin Adair!

Long I ne'er saw thee, love,
Robin Adair;
Still I prayed for thee, love,
Robin Adair;
When thou wert far at sea,
Many made love to me,
But still I thought on thee,
Robin Adair!

Come to my heart again,
Robin Adair;
Never to part again,
Robin Adair;
And if thou still art true,
I will be constant too,
And will wed none but you,
Robin Adair

== Uses in classical music ==
Matthew Dubourg wrote a set of variations on the tune (under the name "Eileen Aroon")

Maria Malibran's romance "L'Ecossais" quotes the tune.

Francois Boieldieu quotes the tune in the aria "Vive a jamais notre nouveau seigneur" of his opera La dame blanche

William Vincent Wallace wrote an impromptu based on the tune
