= John Frederick Adair =

John Adair
Personal information
- Full name: John Frederick Adair
- Born: 20 January 1851; Dublin, Ireland
- Died: 1 April 1913 (aged 62); Ballsbridge, County Dublin, Ireland
- Role: Wicket-keeper

Domestic team information
- Years: Team
- 1875: Cambridge University
- First-class debut: 6 May 1875 England XI v Cambridge University
- Last First-class: 27 May 1875 Cambridge University v MCC

Career statistics
Competition	First-class
Matches	2
Runs scored	31
Batting average	31.00
100s/50s	0/0
Top score	17
Catches/stumpings	2/–
- Source: CricInfo, 3 March 2011

John Frederick Adair (20 January 1852 – 1 April 1913) was an Irish mathematician and physicist who taught in England and Australia. He was a keen cricketer who played first-class cricket for Cambridge University in 1875.

Adair was born at St Stephen's Green, Dublin, the son of John Adair, a lawyer. He studied at Trinity College Dublin being a scholar in 1871 and being awarded BA in mathematics in 1873. In 1874 he was admitted at Pembroke College, Cambridge and was awarded BA in mathematics (7th Wrangler) in 1878. From 1878 and 1879 he was an assistant master at Derby School and from 1887 to 1890 he was a demonstrator in physics at the University of Sydney. Adair died at Ballsbridge, County Dublin, Ireland at the age of 61.

== Cricket ==
Adair played cricket for Trinity College, Dublin between 1870 and 1874. While at Derby school he played one cricket match for Derbyshire against their Colts. He also played for I Zingari. In 1874 he was admitted at Pembroke College, Cambridge, and while at Cambridge played one cricket match for Cambridge University and one against the university for an England XI led by WG Grace. In 1883 Adair played cricket for an Ireland side.

== Papers ==
- On the Velocity of Transmission through Sea-Water of Disturbances of Large Amplitude Caused by Explosions (with Richard Threlfall) Proceedings of the Royal Society of London, Volume 46, pp. 496–541, 1889
