= Charles F. Adair =

American park ranger

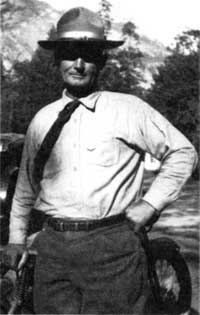
- Born: October 19, 1874; Bear Valley, California
- Died: 7 December 1936 (aged 62); Los Angeles, California
- Occupation: Park ranger
- Years active: 1914–1935
- Employer: National Park Service
- Spouse: Gerda Adair

Charles F. Adair (1874–1936) was an American park ranger.

== Life ==
Adair was born on October 19, 1874, to Irish immigrant parents in Bear Valley, California. His father immigrated to the United States in 1833, and in 1860 moved west into Mariposa County as part of a company of men with John Fremont.

Adair was one of the family's six children, all of whom lived in Mariposa County.

Early in life, he worked as a miner in California and, later, Arizona, until 1914, when he became one of the first park rangers in Yosemite National Park. In 1929, he was made acting park forester for a year. He planted two giant sequoia trees near the ranger housing in Yosemite Valley. He is responsible for introducing golden trout into Adair Lake in Yosemite, which was named after him.
