= James Makittrick Adair =

British physician and anti-abolitionist

James Makittrick Adair FRCPE
- Born: James Makittrick; 1728; Scotland
- Died: 1801 (aged 72–73); Ayr, Scotland
- Resting place: Alloway Auld Kirk
- Education: University of Edinburgh
- Occupations: Physician, Pamphleteer, Anti-Abolitionist
- Known for: Medical ethics and treatment of slaves

James Makittrick Adair MD FRCPE (1728–1802) was a Scottish physician, pamphleteer, and anti-abolitionist.

== Early life ==
Born in 1728 in either Inverness or Ayr, to James Makittrick and his wife, the daughter of Robert Adair of Kirkmaiden, Mull of Galloway. Adair adopted his mother's maiden name in 1783. Sources differ as to the occupation of Adair's father. Hugh James Rose's New General Biographical Dictionary suggests he was an officer in the Inland Revenue at Edinburgh. However the Oxford Dictionary of National Biography suggests he was a Doctor living in Ayr.

== Career ==
Adair was educated at the University of Edinburgh, earning his MD in 1766 with a dissertation on the subject of Yellow Fever. He was elected a Fellow of the Royal College of Physicians of Edinburgh in 1767. Upon graduation was appointed surgeon's mate of the sloop-of-war HMS Porcupine (1746), bound to the Leeward Islands. Shortly after, he relocated to Antigua, where assisting a relative in management of a plantation. After several years in the West Indies, he visited America where he made the acquaintance of Benjamin Franklin, before returning to Britain and settling in Andover, in Hampshire. Following the outbreak of American Revolutionary War, he returned to Antigua where he was appointed physician to Monk's Hill, and as one of the assistant judges of the Courts of King's Bench and Common Pleas. In 1783 Adair left the West Indies for the final time, and settled in Bath, where he resumed his medical practice.

== Writing ==
Adair was also widely published author, with a primary focus on medical texts. Works include, Medical Cautions for the consideration of Invalids, which espoused the health benefits of Spa towns such as Bath, An essay on diet and regimen, and Essays on fashionable diseases [...[ and on Quacks and Quackery. Adair's irascible personality led to multiple disputes with his both his professional colleagues and those outside the medical community. These arose partly from a determined opposition to quackery, but was also attributed to his hot temper, as evidenced by his time served in Winchester Gaol for issuing a challenge to a duel. He was most famously involved in a long running dispute with Phillip Thicknesse, which began after the latter took exception to a presumed insult in Medical Cautions. After a number of back and forths, including a dedication in which Adair referred to his rival as “Censor-General of Great-Britain, Professor of Empiricism, and Nostrum, Rape, and Murder-Monger to the St. James's Chronicle“, Adair published a book containing so-called errata to Thicknesse's memoirs, presumably fabricated, accompanied by a satirical woodcut frontispiece.

In addition to his medical work, he published a number of spiritual and satirical works including The Methodist and the Mimick, under nom de plume of Peter Paragraph. Most controversially however, was his 1790 anti-abolitionist pamphlet Unanswerable Arguments against the Abolition of the Slave Trade, where Adair presented an argument that drew from his own experience on the plantations of Antigua, presenting chattel slavery as a paternalistic system that provided a better quality of life for the enslaved people than freedom would.

== Family ==
Adair married several times, and had a daughter, Anne Adair, and a son, James Makittrick Adair. The younger James was a friend of Robert Burns, and married Charlotte Hamilton, the half-sister of Gavin Hamilton. He also followed his father into the medical profession, and was also elected a Fellow of the Royal College of Physicians of Edinburgh in 1793.

== Death and Burial ==
Adair died in Ayr in 1801, and was buried in the churchyard of Alloway Auld Kirk. Earlier versions of the Dictionary of National Biography erroneously stated that he died in Harrogate in 1802, which are in fact the details for his son of the same name.
