= Robert Adair (surgeon) =

Irish surgeon

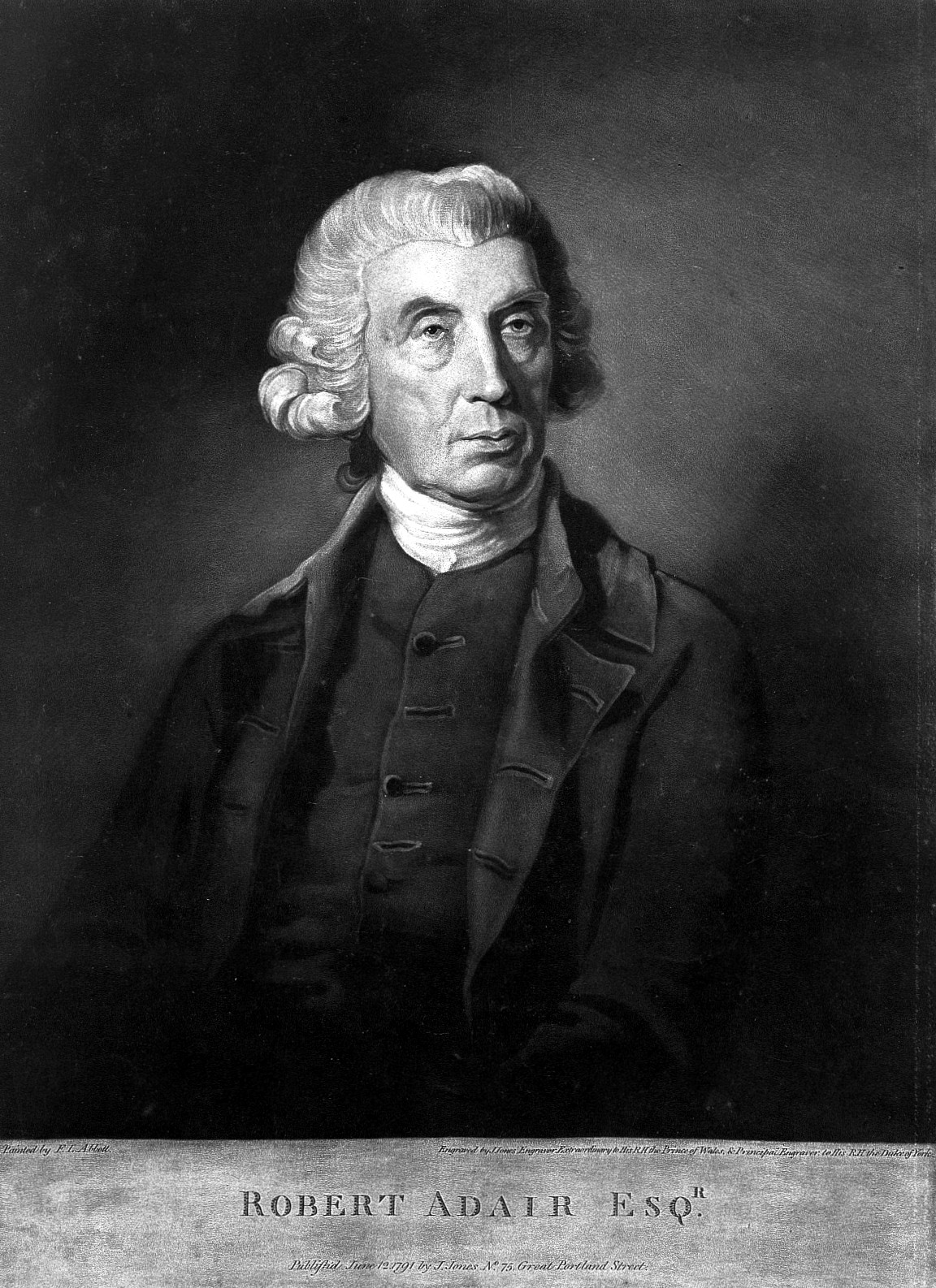
Robert Adair in an engraving from 1791 by J. Jones after F. L. Abbott's 1780s portrait

Robert Adair (c. 1711 – 1790) was an Irish surgeon who became chief surgeon to the British Army and Master of the Surgeon's Company, and married into the British aristocracy.

== Career ==
Trained in Dublin, he was accused in 1737 of adultery with Anglo-Irish poet Laetitia Pilkington and left Ireland to travel to London. Adair became a member of the London Company of Barbers and Surgeons in 1738. His military career began when he joined the army in the role of staff surgeon in Flanders in March 1742, and a few months later in June 1742 he furthered his studies by enrolling at the medical school of Leiden University. By 1756, he was chief surgeon to the Hospital for the Forces in Britain. In 1761, he was appointed Inspector of Regimental Infirmaries in Britain (with the rank of Inspector-General), and by 1767 had been appointed Master of his professional body, the Surgeons' Company in London (which had broken away from the barbers in 1745). Further honours came in 1773 with his appointment as surgeon (Serjeant Surgeon) to King George III and to the Royal Chelsea Hospital. In 1786, four years before his death on 16 March 1790, he was made Surgeon-General of Great Britain.

Mentions of Adair in the society news and correspondence of the times include the journeys made by him and Sir Richard Jebb, 1st Baronet to Italy in 1771 and 1777 to attend to the younger brother of King George III, the Duke of Gloucester. The travels of Adair in Italy in the 1770s are documented by art historian Sir Brinsley Ford, including a collection of bronzes, marbles and Old Master paintings that were auctioned at Christies in May 1790. Adair was later among the first honorary members of the Royal College of Surgeons in Ireland (1784).

== Marriage and family ==
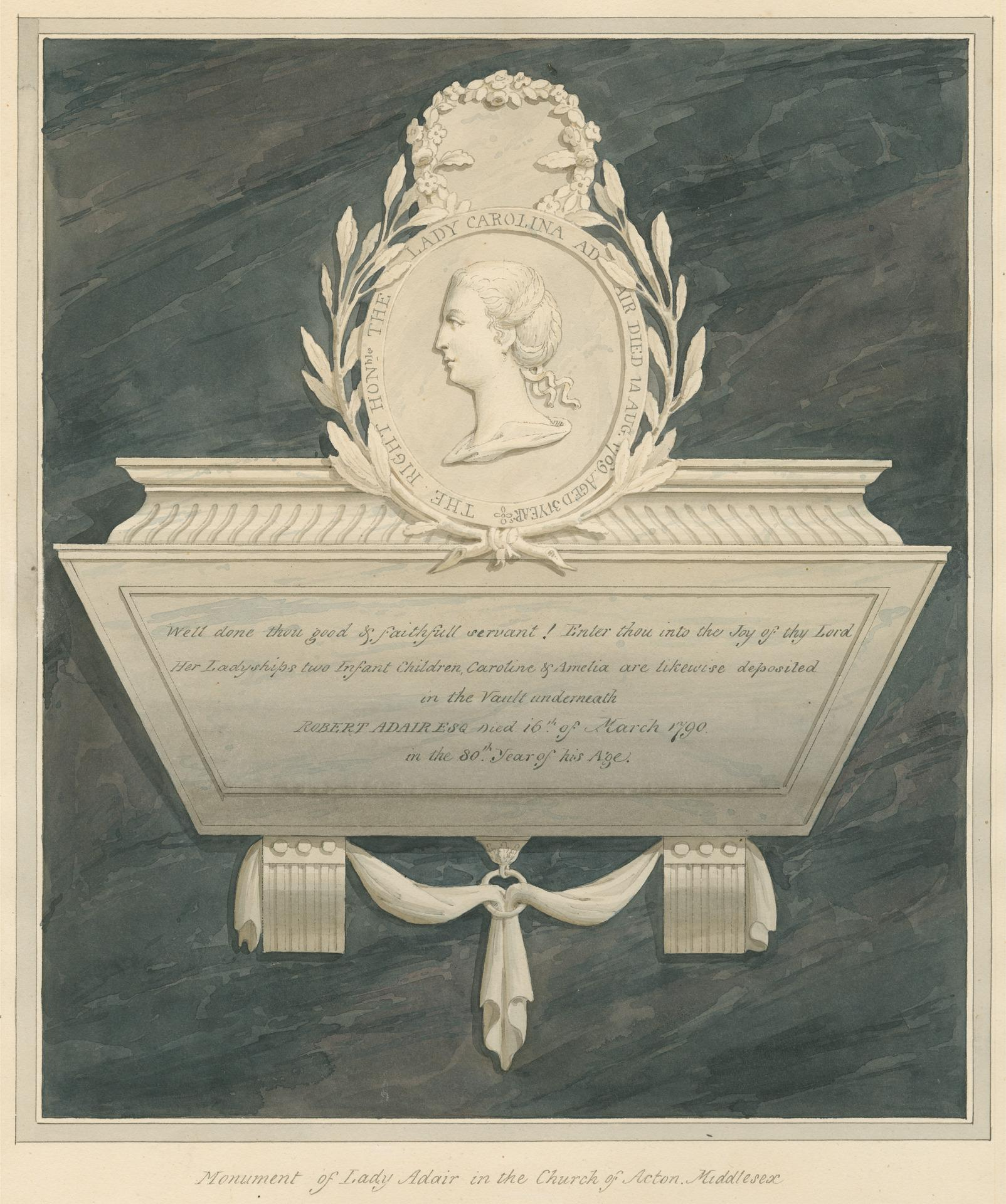
Artwork (by Daniel Lysons) of the memorial to Caroline and her family in St Mary's Church, Acton

He married Lady Caroline Keppel on 22 February 1758. Her parents were Willem van Keppel, 2nd Earl of Albemarle and Anne van Keppel, Countess of Albemarle (a grand-daughter through an illegitimate line of King Charles II). The children of Caroline and Robert included the future distinguished British diplomat Sir Robert Adair (1763–1855). Two daughters (Caroline and Amelia) died in infancy. Two other daughters were Diana (1760-1851) and Elizabeth (1769-1841), who married George Barrington, 5th Viscount Barrington.

A memorial to him and his family (primarily centred on his wife Caroline Keppel (1734–1769), who predeceased him due to consumption) was erected in St Mary's Church, Acton, London. Adair was buried alongside her on March 24, 1790.

The song 'Robin Adair' was composed by Caroline in tribute to her husband after her aristocratic family's reaction to her proposed marriage. An oil-on-canvas portrait of Adair by Lemuel Francis Abbott (dating from the 1780s) is held at the Hunterian Museum in London.
