= Robert Adair (cricketer) =

Irish cricketer (1876–1951)

Cricket information
- Batting: Right-handed
- Bowling: Right-arm fast-medium

International information
- National side: Ireland

Career statistics
Competition	First-class
Matches	4
Runs scored	86
Batting average	14.33
100s/50s	0/0
Top score	32
Balls bowled	54
Wickets	1
Bowling average	37.00
5 wickets in innings	0
10 wickets in match	0
Best bowling	1/29
Catches/stumpings	3/–
- Source: CricketArchive, 27 May 2021

Robert Emile Adair (1876 – 18 March 1951) was an Irish cricketer. He was a right-handed batsman and a right-arm fast-medium bowler.

He first played for Ireland against I Zingari in August 1899, and next played in Ireland's first four first-class matches in 1902, his last coming against Cambridge University. He later played for a Scottish Counties team against Yorkshire in 1910 in a match that was abandoned after one day due to the death of King Edward VII.
