= John G. Adair =

Canadian psychologist

John Glenn Adair

Academic background
- Education: University of Iowa
- Thesis: The effects of magnitude of reward and punishment on behavior in a temporal conflict situation (1965)

Academic work
- Discipline: Psychology
- Sub-discipline: Social psychology
- Institutions: University of Manitoba

John G. Adair is a Canadian psychologist whose work was concerned with the social nature and ethics of psychological research.

== Career ==
Adair obtained his PhD in social psychology from the University of Iowa in 1965. He then obtained a faculty position at the University of Manitoba, Winnipeg where he stayed for the remainder of his academic career retiring as emeritus Professor of Psychology in 1999.

He was an active member of regional, national and international psychological associations.

== Research ==
Adair's research considered such issues as the social nature of human research methodology, the ethics of research with human subjects, social science research policy, indigenization and development of the discipline in developing countries, and the internationalization of psychology.

== Publications ==
- Adair, J.G. (2005). The origins and development of social psychology in Canada. International Journal of Psychology, 40 (4), 277–288.
- Vohra, N., & Adair, J. (2000). Life Satisfaction of Indian Immigrants in Canada. Psychology and Developing Societies.
- Adair, J.G. (Ed). (1998). Advances in Psychological Science: Social, Personal, and Cultural Aspects.
- Adair, J.G. The human subject; the social psychology of the psychological experiment.
- Adair, J.G. (1984). The Hawthorne effect: a reconsideration of the methodological artifact. Journal of Applied Psychology, 69 (2), 334–345.

== Positions ==
- President, Canadian Psychological Association (1980)
- Honorary Life Fellow, Canadian Psychological Association

== Awards ==
- 2001: Interamerican Psychology Award for Distinguished Contributions to the Development of Psychology as a Science and as a Profession in the Americas, Interamerican Psychological Society
- Fellow, Canadian Psychological Association
