= Robert Adair (physicist) =

American physicist (1924–2020)

- Born: August 14, 1924; Fort Wayne, Indiana, U.S.
- Died: September 28, 2020 (aged 96); Hamden, Connecticut, U.S.
- Education: University of Wisconsin
- Spouse: Eleanor Adair (physiologist)
- Scientific career
- Fields: Physics
- Workplaces: University of Wisconsin; Brookhaven National Laboratory; Yale University

Robert Kemp Adair (August 14, 1924 – September 28, 2020) was an American physicist. He latterly held the position of Sterling Professor Emeritus of physics at Yale University.

== Biography ==
Adair served in the European theatre after volunteering for World War II and was awarded a Purple Heart and Bronze star. After achieving a doctorate in experimental nuclear physics at the University of Wisconsin he worked at Brookhaven National Laboratory (BNL) in Long Island. In 1959 he joined the faculty at Yale, serving as chair of the Department of Physics and director of the Division of Physical Sciences. He was elected to the National Academy of Sciences in 1976 where he served as Chairman of the Physics Section 1986-1989 and Chairman of the Class of Physical Sciences 1991–1994. He was elected a Fellow of the American Academy of Arts and Sciences in 1997, after a distinguished career in, among many other subfields of physics, weak-interaction (Kaon) physics at the Alternating Gradient Synchrotron (AGS) at BNL.

Later, in his retirement, he studied the effects of extremely low frequency (weak) electromagnetic fields on human health and among other responsibilities, served on the Committee of the American Physical Society (APS) established to investigate the APS Statement on Global Warming in 2007, which was not without its own internal controversy. He died in September 2020 at the age of 96.

== Books and baseball ==
Adair, a member of the National Academy of Sciences, was known for authoring The Physics of Baseball as well as a paper titled The Crack of the Bat: The Acoustics of the Bat Hitting the Ball. His studies into baseball stemmed from a request from former Yale President A. Bartlett Giamatti to better characterize the scientific significance of corking a bat, wetting a ball and other similar baseball established practices.

Many of the table top experiments which provided the observational facts which formed the basis for Adair's conclusions about the physics of baseball were performed by his longtime technical laboratory expert within the Brookhaven National Laboratory Physics Department, Richard Larsen, who also contributed significantly to much of Adair's Yale-led experimental programme at the BNL AGS.

Another publication from Adair is The Great Design: Particles, Fields and Creation.
