= Charles Henry Adair =

Royal Navy officer (1851–1920)

Admiral Charles Henry Adair
- Born: 2 July 1851
- Died: 9 March 1920 (aged 68)
- Relatives: General Sir William Adair (brother)
- Military career
- Allegiance: United Kingdom
- Branch: Royal Navy
- Service years: 1864–1913
- Rank: Admiral
- Commands: Second Cruiser Squadron (1907–09); Sheerness-Chatham Reserve Division (1906–07); HMS Barfleur (1905); HMS Royal Sovereign (1900); HMS Imperieuse (1896)
- Conflicts: Mahdist War: Battle of Suakin

Admiral Charles Henry Adair (2 July 1851 – 9 March 1920) was a Royal Navy officer in mid-late 19th century and the early 20th century. He retired just prior to the outbreak of World War I.

== Royal Navy service ==
Adair entered the Royal Navy, and saw early service in Eastern Sudan. He was briefly in command of the armoured cruiser HMS Australia from November 1899 to January 1900, when she was coast guard ship for Southampton Water. On 20 January 1900 he commissioned HMS Royal Sovereign for service on the Mediterranean Squadron. He was captain when on 9 November 1901 one of the ship's 6-inch (152 mm) guns exploded, killing one officer and five marines, and injuring another 20 people. Following the accident, he returned to the United Kingdom, and was in January 1902 appointed to HMS Wildfire, shore establishment at Sheerness, for command of the Gunnery School.

Charles Henry Adair died on 9 March 1920.
