= Robert Adair (politician) =

English diplomat (1763–1855)

The Right Honourable Sir Robert Adair GCB
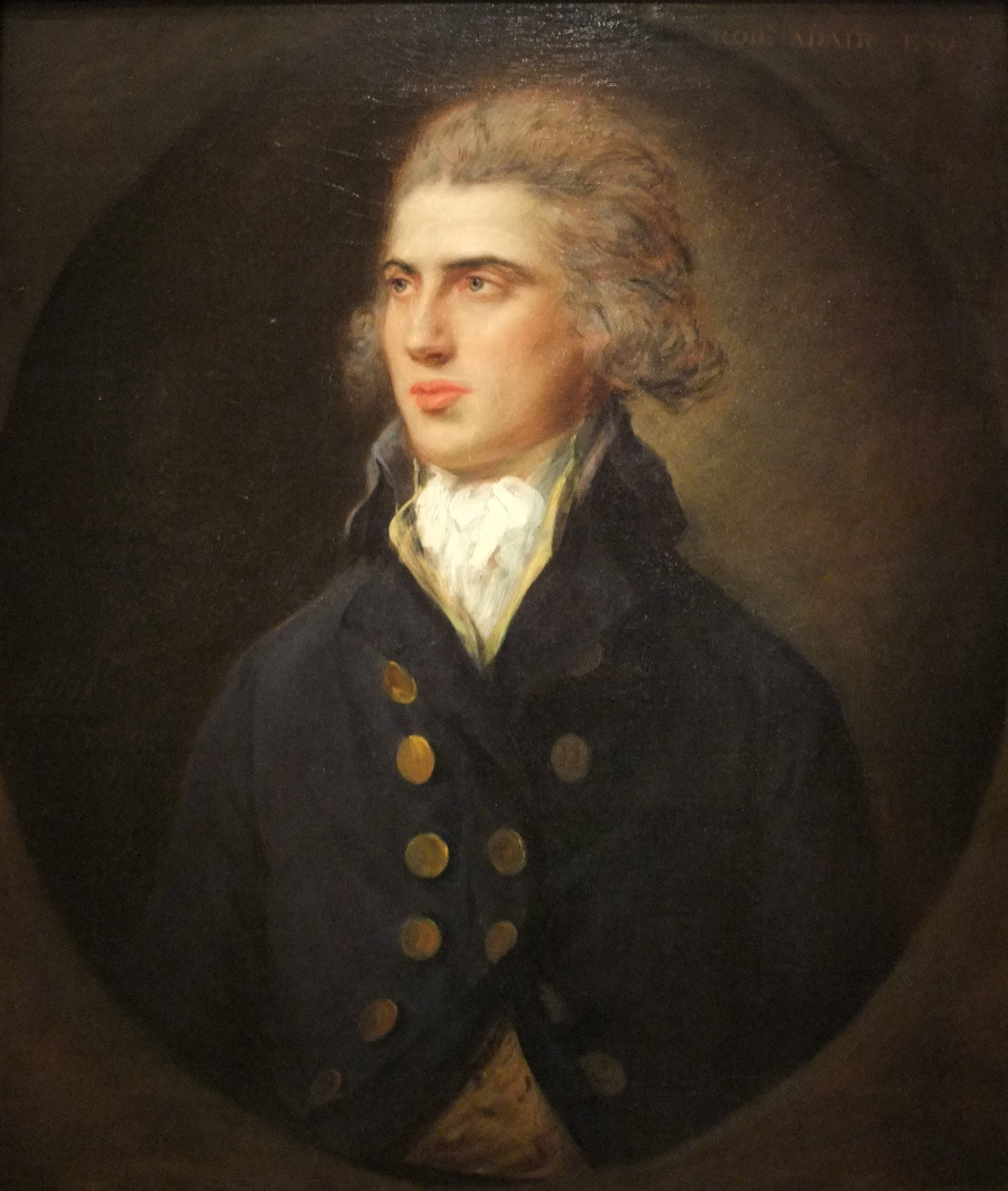
- Portrait by Thomas Gainsborough, 1785

British Ambassador to Belgium
- In office 1831–1835
- Monarch: William IV
- Preceded by: John Ponsonby
- Succeeded by: Stratford Canning

British Ambassador to the Ottoman Empire
- In office 1808–1809
- Preceded by: Sir Arthur Paget
- Succeeded by: Henry Bulwer

British Ambassador to Austria
- In office 1806–1807
- Monarch: George III
- Prime Minister: William Cavendish-Bentinck
- Preceded by: Sir Arthur Paget
- Succeeded by: George Herbert

Member of Parliament for Camelford
- In office 1802–1812
- Preceded by: William Joseph Denison
- Succeeded by: John Angerstein

Personal details
- Born: 24 May 1763
- Died: 3 October 1855 (aged 92)
- Party: Whig
- Spouse: Angélique Gabrielle (m. 1805)
- Education: Westminster School; University of Göttingen

Sir Robert Adair GCB (24 May 1763 – 3 October 1855) was a British diplomat, and frequently employed on the most important diplomatic missions.

He was the son of Robert Adair, sergeant-surgeon to George III, and Lady Caroline Keppel, daughter of Willem Anne van Keppel, 2nd Earl of Albemarle. He was educated at Westminster School and the University of Göttingen, and then studied law at Lincoln's Inn, but hardly practised as a barrister.

He hoped to gain office as Under-secretary of State to Charles James Fox, but he was in opposition. Following the French Revolution, he travelled in Europe, visiting Berlin, Vienna, and St Petersburg to study the effects of the revolution and equip himself for a diplomatic career.

He became Whig member of parliament (MP) for Appleby (1799–1802) and Camelford (1802–12).

In 1805, he made a disastrous marriage to Angélique Gabrielle, daughter of the marquis de l'Escuyer d'Hazincourt (known as 'Talleyrand's spy'), but this kept him out of office when Fox returned to government. Instead Fox sent him to Vienna. In June 1808, George Canning transferred him to Constantinople. He was created a KCB in that year for his services there.

As British ambassador to the Ottoman Empire, he reported on the case of the Elgin marbles. In 1811, he wrote that the Ottomans had 'absolutely denied' that Elgin had any property in the sculptures.

He was appointed a Privy Counsellor in 1828. He was employed in Belgium from 1831 to 1835, where he succeeded in preventing a war between Belgium and The Netherlands. This exploit won for him the rank of GCB and a pension of £2000 per year from 1831, and also the grand'cross of the Belgian order of Leopold in 1835. He then visited Prussia. In the 1840s, he published memoirs of his diplomatic activities in the 1800s.

Parliament of Great Britain
Preceded by John Tufton; John Courtenay	Member of Parliament for Appleby; 1799–1800; With: John Courtenay	Succeeded by Parliament of the United Kingdom
Parliament of the United Kingdom
Preceded by Parliament of Great Britain	Member of Parliament for Appleby; 1801–1802; With: John Courtenay	Succeeded by Sir Philip Francis; John Courtenay
Preceded by William Joseph Denison; John Angerstein	Member of Parliament for Camelford; 1802–1812; With: John Fonblanque 1802–1806; Viscount Maitland 1806–1807; Lord Henry Petty 1807–1810; Henry Brougham 1810–1812	Succeeded by William Leader; Samuel Scott
Diplomatic posts
Preceded by Sir Arthur Paget	British Minister to Austria; 1806–1807	Succeeded by The Earl of Pembroke and Montgomery
Preceded by Sir Arthur Paget	British Ambassador to the Ottoman Empire; 1808–1809	Succeeded by Stratford Canning; Chargé d'Affaires
Preceded by The Lord Ponsonby	British Ambassador to Belgium; 1831–1835	Succeeded by Henry Lytton Bulwer; Chargé d'Affaires
