= Charles L. Adair =

United States Navy rear admiral (1902–1993)

Charles Adair
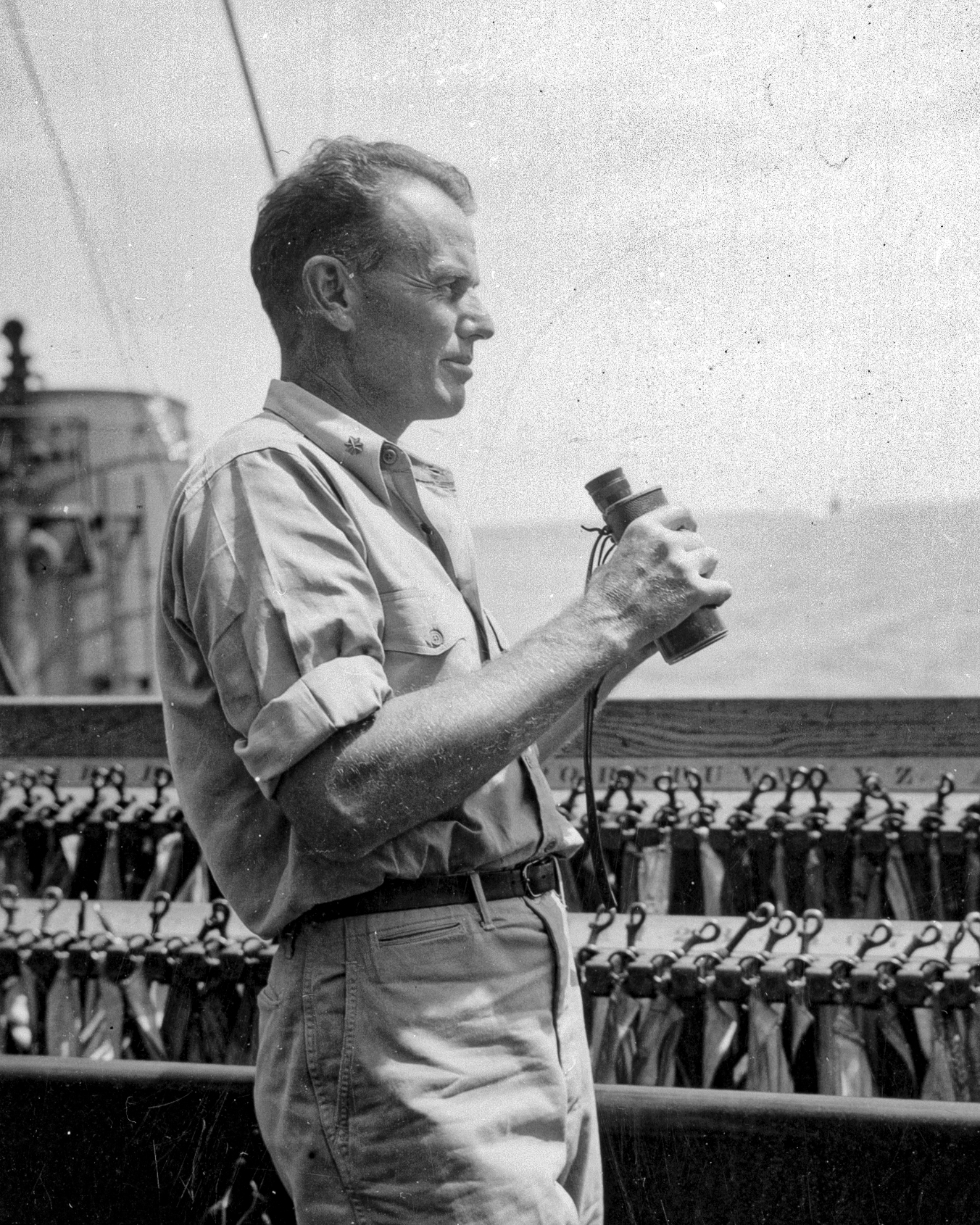
- Adair c. 1956
- Born: November 21, 1902; Tyler, Texas
- Died: July 2, 1993 (aged 90); Annapolis Maryland
- Burial place: United States Naval Academy Cemetery
- Military career
- Allegiance: United States
- Branch: United States Navy
- Service years: 1926–1956
- Rank: Rear admiral
- Units: United States Asiatic Fleet; USS Lanikai; Seventh Amphibious Force
- Commands: USS Marquette
- Conflicts: World War II
- Awards: Legion of Merit; Silver Star

Charles L. Adair (21 November 1902 – 2 July 1993) was a rear admiral in the United States Navy during the early Cold War.

== Biography ==
Born in Texas, his family resettled in California in 1908. Graduating from Annapolis in 1926, Adair attended the Naval Postgraduate School after seven years serving afloat. he died of pneumonia in 1993 at age 90.
