= Independent Labour Party election results =

UK political party election results

This article lists the Independent Labour Party's election results in UK parliamentary elections.

== Summary of general election performance ==
Year	Number of candidates	Total votes	Average voters per candidate	Percentage of vote	Saved deposits	Change (%)	Number of MPs
1895	28	44,325	1,583	1.0	N/A	N/A	0
1900	9	32,135	3,571	0.9	N/A	-0.1	1
1906	11	81,415	7,401	1.6	N/A	+0.7	7
1910 Jan	14	87,499	6,250	1.4	N/A	-0.2	6
1910 Dec	12	69,884	5,824	1.4	N/A	0.0	8
1918	50						3
1922	55	673,283	12,242	4.9	31		31
1923	89						39
1924	87						30
1929	54	921,914	17,072	4.3	54		36
1931	19	239,280	12,594	1.2		-3.1	3
1935	17	136,208	8,012	0.7	9	-0.5	4
1945	5	46,769	9,354	0.2	4	-0.5	3
1950	4	4,112	1,028	0.0	0	-0.2	0
1951	3	4,057	1,352	0.0	0	0.0	0
1955	2	3,334	1,667	0.0	0	0.0	0
1959	2	923	462	0.0	0	0.0	0
1964	0	N/A	N/A	N/A	N/A	N/A	N/A
1966	1	441	441	0.0	0	N/A	0
1970	1	847	847	0.0	0	0.0	0
February 1974	1	991	991	0.0	0	0.0	0

== Election results ==
=== By-elections, 1893–1895 ===
By-election	Candidate	Votes	%	Position
1894 Sheffield Attercliffe by-election	Frank Smith	1,249	13.5	3
1894 Leicester by-election	Joseph Burgess	4,402	15.7	4

=== 1895 general election ===
Constituency	Candidate	Votes	%	Position
Ashton-under-Lyne	James Sexton	415	6.4	3
Barrow-in-Furness	Pete Curran	414	6.9	3
Bradford West	Ben Tillett	2,264	23.4	3
Bolton	Fred Brocklehurst	2,691	9.8	4
Bristol East	Samuel George Hobson	1,874	31.2	2
Colne Valley	Tom Mann	1,245	13.4	3
Dewsbury	Edward Hartley	1,080	10.5	3
Dundee	James MacDonald	1,313	5.0	5
Fulham	William Parnell	191	2.0	3
Glasgow Blackfriars and Hutchesontown	James Shaw Maxwell	448	7.1	3
Glasgow Bridgeton	James Robertson Watson	609	9.4	3
Glasgow Camlachie	Robert Smillie	696	10.9	3
Glasgow St Rollox	John Evans Woolacott	405	4.4	3
Glasgow Tradeston	Frank Smith	368	5.8	3
Gorton	Richard Pankhurst	4,261	42.1	2
Govan	Alex Haddow	430	4.9	3
Halifax	John Lister	3,818	20.5	4
Huddersfield	Russell Smart	1,594	11.2	3
Hyde	George Christie	448	5.0	3
Kingston upon Hull West	Tom McCarthy	1,400	17.4	2
Leeds South	Arthur Shaw	622	6.4	3
Leicester	Joseph Burgess	4,009	13.7	4
Manchester North East	James Johnston	546	6.6	3
Newcastle-upon-Tyne	Fred Hammill	2,302	4.6	5
Preston	James Tattersall	4,781	22.4	3
Rochdale	George Nicoll Barnes	1,251	12.0	3
Southampton	Ramsay MacDonald	867	4.0	5
West Ham South	Keir Hardie	3,975	45.6	2

=== By-elections, 1895–1900 ===
By-election	Candidate	Votes	%	Position
1896 Aberdeen North by-election	Tom Mann	2,479	46.0	2
1896 Bradford East by-election	Keir Hardie	1,953	17.1	3
1897 Halifax by-election	Tom Mann	2,000	15.5	3
1897 Barnsley by-election	Pete Curran	1,091	9.7	3

=== 1900 general election ===
Constituency	Candidate	Votes	%	Position
Accrington	John Hempsall	433	3.3	3
Ashton-under-Lyne	James Johnston	737	11.0	3
Blackburn	Philip Snowden	7,096	25.6	3
Bradford West	Fred Jowett	4,949	49.8	2
Halifax	James Parker	3,276	16.1	4
Leicester	Ramsay MacDonald	4,164	13.0	4
Merthyr Tydfil	Keir Hardie	5,745	31.3	2
Preston	Keir Hardie	4,834	22.1	3
Rochdale	Allen Clarke	901	8.0	3

Hardie stood for two seats. All candidates other than Hempsall stood as part of the Labour Representation Committee. Clarke ran as a joint Independent Labour Party-Social Democratic Federation candidate. The list does not include Alfred Ewen Fletcher, who was supported by the ILP but ran for the Scottish Workers' Representation Committee.

=== By-elections, 1900–1906 ===
By-election	Candidate	Votes	%	Position
1902 Wakefield by-election	Philip Snowden	1,979	40.1	2
1904 Norwich by-election	George Henry Roberts	2,440	13.7	3

All candidates stood as part of the Labour Representation Committee.

=== 1906 general election ===
Constituency	Candidate	Votes	%	Position
Blackburn	Philip Snowden	10,282	26.8	2
Bradford West	Fred Jowett	4,957	39.1	1
Glasgow Camlachie	Joseph Burgess	2,568	30.0	3
Halifax	James Parker	8,937	38.3	2
Huddersfield	T. Russell Williams	5,813	35.2	2
Keighley	W. T. Newlove	3,102	26.9	3
Leicester	Ramsay MacDonald	14,685	39.8	2
Manchester North East	John Robert Clynes	5,386	64.6	1
Merthyr Tydfil	Keir Hardie	10,187	32.0	2
Sunderland	Thomas Summerbell	13,430	31.8	2
Wakefield	Stanton Coit	2,068	36.9	2

All candidates other than Burgess and Newlove stood as part of the Labour Representation Committee. Only ILP members sponsored by the party are listed.

=== By-elections, 1906–1910 ===
By-election	Candidate	Votes	%	Position
1906 Huddersfield by-election	T. Russell Williams	5,422	33.8	2
1907 Aberdeen South by-election	Fred Bramley	1,740	19.5	3
1908 Montrose Burghs by-election	Joseph Burgess	1,937	29.4	2
1909 Croydon by-election	Frank Smith	886	4.2	3

All candidates other than Bramley stood for the Labour Party. Only candidates sponsored by the ILP are listed.

=== January 1910 general election ===
Constituency	Candidate	Votes	%	Position
Blackburn	Philip Snowden	10,762		1
Bow and Bromley	George Lansbury	2,955	33.5	2
Bradford West	Fred Jowett	8,880	66.6	1
Glasgow Camlachie	James O'Connor Kessack	2,443	28.9	3
Halifax	James Parker	9,093	38.9	2
Hyde	William Crawford Anderson	2,401	21.2	3
Leicester	Ramsay MacDonald	14,337	38.2	2
Manchester North East	John Robert Clynes	5,157	58.4	1
Manchester South West	J. M. McLachlan	1,218	16.6	3
Merthyr Tydfil	Keir Hardie	13,841	36.7	2
Spen Valley	T. Russell Williams	2,514	23.3	3
Sunderland	Thomas Summerbell	11,058	23.4	4
Tewkesbury	Charles Fox	238	2.1	3
Wakefield	Stanton Coit	2,602	45.5	2

All candidates stood as part of the Labour Party. Only ILP members sponsored by the party are listed.

=== December 1910 general election ===
Constituency	Candidate	Votes	%	Position
Blackburn	Philip Snowden	10,762		1
Bow and Bromley	George Lansbury	4,315	55.6	1
Bradford West	Fred Jowett	8,880	66.6	1
Chatham	Frank Smith	1,103	8.9	3
Glasgow Camlachie	James O'Connor Kessack	1,539	18.1	3
Halifax	James Parker	8,511		2
Leeds South	John Badlay	2,706	21.5	3
Leicester	Ramsay MacDonald	12,998	38.5	2
Liverpool Kirkdale	Thomas McKerrell	2,992	41.6	2
Manchester North East	J. R. Clynes	4,313		1
Merthyr Tydfil	Keir Hardie	11,507	39.6	2
Whitehaven	Thomas Richardson	1,414	53.7	1

All candidates stood as part of the Labour Party.

=== By-elections, 1910–1918 ===
By-election	Candidate	Votes	%	Position
1911 Kilmarnock Burghs by-election	Thomas McKerrell	2,761	19.3	3
1911 Keighley by-election	William Crawford Anderson	3,452	28.9	3
1912 East Carmarthenshire by-election	John Henry Williams	1,089	10.3	3
1913 Keighley by-election	William Bland	3,646	29.8	3
1914 Sheffield Attercliffe by-election	William Crawford Anderson	unopposed	N/A	1
1918 Keighley by-election	William Bland	2,349	32.5	2
1918 Manchester North East by-election	J. R. Clynes	unopposed	N/A	1

All candidates except Williams and Bland (in 1918) stood for the Labour Party.

=== 1918 general election ===
Constituency	Candidate	Votes	%	Position
Aberdare	T. E. Nicholas	6,229	21.4	2
Accrington	Charles Roden Buxton	6,369	21.7	3
Ayr Burghs	Campbell Stephen	4,534	23.2	3
Bermondsey West	Alfred Salter	1,956	18.6	3
Birmingham Ladywood	John Kneeshaw	2,572	19.0	2
Blackburn	Philip Snowden	15,274	19.7	3
Bosworth	Thomas Richardson	6,344	33.6	2
Bradford Central	William Leach	7,636	31.3	2
Bradford East	Frederick William Jowett	8,637	37.9	2
Brigg	David Quibell	4,789	27.3	2
Bristol East	Luke Bateman	8,135	42.8	2
Camberwell North	Charles Ammon	2,175	21.0	3
Cardiff Central	James Ewart Edmunds	4,663	22.4	2
Chorley	Elijah Sandham	6,222	32.3	2
Colne Valley	Wilfrid Whiteley	9,473	41.2	2
Coventry	Richard Collingham Wallhead	10,298	32.4	2
Dewsbury	Benjamin Riley	5,596	30.1	2
Dunbartonshire	William Henry Porteous Martin	7,072	30.9	2
Edinburgh Central	William Graham	7,161	51.3	1
Glasgow Bridgeton	James Maxton	7,860	39.8	2
Glasgow Camlachie	Hugh Guthrie	7,192	33.1	2
Glasgow Govan	Neil Maclean	9,577	47.8	1
Glasgow Hillhead	John Izett	4,186	24.6	2
Glasgow St Rollox	James Stewart	6,147	33.2	2
Glasgow Shettleston	John Wheatley	9,827	49.8	2
Glasgow Springburn	George Hardie	7,996	39.1	2
Huddersfield	Harry Snell	12,737	32.5	2
Ipswich	Robert Jackson	8,143	32.1	2
Keighley	William Bland	6,324	27.7	3
Kingston upon Hull South West	Robert Mell	3,121	19.3	3
Lanark	James C. Welsh	5,821	31.0	2
Leeds West	John Arnott	6,020	29.5	2
Leicester East	George Banton	6,697	27.1	2
Leicester West	Ramsay MacDonald	6,347	24.0	2
Linlithgowshire	Manny Shinwell	8,723	40.3	2
Montrose Burghs	Henry Noel Brailsford	2,940	24.0	2
Motherwell	Walton Newbold	4,135	23.2	2
Newcastle-upon-Tyne Central	James Smith	4,976	34.6	2
Rochdale	R. H. Tawney	4,956	16.5	3
Rutherglen	William Regan	8,759	40.9	2
Sheffield Attercliffe	William Crawford Anderson	6,539	34.7	2
Shipley	Tom Snowden	5,690	25.4	2
Southampton	Frederick Perriman	6,776	09.2	5
Stalybridge and Hyde	Walter Fowden	6,508	24.8	2
Swansea East	David Williams	6,341	36.4	2
West Ham Silvertown	David John Davis	2,278	16.9	3
West Ham Upton	Benjamin Walter Gardner	3,186	22.2	2
West Renfrewshire	Robert Murray	7,126	38.2	2
West Stirlingshire	Tom Johnston	3,809	28.7	2

All candidates stood for the Labour Party.

=== By-elections, 1918–1922 ===
By-election	Candidate	Votes	%	Position
1919 Aberdeenshire and Kincardineshire Central by-election	Joseph Forbes Duncan	3,482	26.4	3
1919 Swansea East by-election	David Williams	8,158	46.9	2
1919 Manchester Rusholme by-election	Robert Dunstan	6,412	31.2	2
1919 Spen Valley by-election	Tom Myers	11,962	39.4	1
1921 Woolwich East by-election	Ramsay MacDonald	13,081	48.7	2
1921 Caerphilly by-election	Morgan Jones	13,699	54.2	1
1922 Leicester East by-election	George Banton	14,062	52.9	1

All candidates stood for the Labour Party.

=== 1922 general election ===
Constituency	Candidate	Votes	%	Position
Aberavon	Ramsay MacDonald	14,138	46.6	1
Accrington	Charles Roden Buxton	16,462	44.2	1
Bermondsey West	Alfred Salter	7,550	44.6	1
Birmingham Ladywood	Robert Dunstan	10,589	44.8	2
Bishop Auckland	Ben Spoor	13,946	53.7	1
Blackburn	Percy Davies	24,049	21.7	3
Bradford Central	William Leach	14,296	42.4	1
Bradford East	Fred Jowett	13,573	45.4	1
Brigg	David Quibell	9,185	37.3	2
Bristol North	Walter Ayles	9,567	35.4	2
Bute and North Ayrshire	John Paton	9,323	39.4	2
Caerphilly	Morgan Jones	13,759	57.2	1
Cardiff Central	James Ewart Edmunds	8,169	29.4	2
Chelsea	Bertrand Russell	4,513	25.1	2
Clackmannan and Eastern Stirlingshire	Lauchlin MacNeill Weir	10,312	42.0	1
Colne Valley	Philip Snowden	12,614	39.5	1
Consett	Herbert Dunnico	14,469	46.5	1
Dewsbury	Benjamin Riley	8,856	37.3	1
Dunbartonshire	W. H. Martin	13,216	49.6	2
East Renfrewshire	Robert Nichol	9,708	42.4	1
Edinburgh Central	William Graham	12,876	57.9	1
Glasgow Bridgeton	James Maxton	17,890	63.7	1
Glasgow Camlachie	Campbell Stephen	15,181	53.2	1
Glasgow Cathcart	John Primrose Hay	9,137	34.0	1
Glasgow Central	Edward Rosslyn Mitchell	12,923	41.9	2
Glasgow Govan	Neil Maclean	15,441	62.3	1
Glasgow Maryhill	John William Muir	13,058	47.3	1
Glasgow Pollok	Alexander Burns Mackay	5,759	24.7	2
Glasgow St Rollox	James Stewart	16,114	56.6	1
Glasgow Shettleston	John Wheatley	14,695	59.1	1
Glasgow Springburn	George Hardie	15,771	60.5	1
Huddersfield	James Hindle Hudson	15,673	33.5	2
Ipswich	Robert Jackson	14,924	46.6	2
Keighley	Hastings Lees-Smith	13,978	46.3	1
Kilmarnock	Robert Climie	10,752	45.3	2
Kingston upon Hull South West	John Arnott	4,859	19.1	3
Lanark	Thomas Scott Dickson	9,812	45.0	2
Lancaster	Fenner Brockway	9,043	31.6	2
Leeds North East	John Badlay	6,525	24.4	3
Leeds West	Thomas Stamford	12,487	48.3	2
Leicester East	George Banton	13,850	47.7	2
Limehouse	Clement Attlee	9,688	55.4	1
Linlithgowshire	Manny Shinwell	12,625	46.4	1
Merthyr	R. C. Wallhead	17,516	53.0	1
Montrose Burghs	John Carnegie	7,044	45.6	2
Newcastle-under-Lyme	Josiah Wedgwood	14,503	60.2	1
Newcastle Central	Charles Trevelyan	13,709	54.2	1
Norwich	Herbert Witard	15,609	16.9	3
Rutherglen	William Wright	14,029	55.1	1
Sheffield Brightside	Arthur Ponsonby	16,692	60.4	1
Spen Valley	Tom Myers	12,519	36.9	2
Stirling and Clackmannan West	Tom Johnston	9,919	55.0	1
Swansea East	David Williams	11,333	50.9	1
Upton	Benjamin Walter Gardner	7,268	32.8	1
West Renfrewshire	Robert Murray	11,787	54.0	1

All candidates stood for the Labour Party.

=== By-elections, 1922–1923 ===
By-election	Candidate	Votes	%	Position
1923 Ludlow by-election	Percy F. Pollard	1,420	7.8	3

Candidate stood for the Labour Party.

=== 1923 UK general election ===
Constituency	Candidate	Votes	%	Position
Aberavon	Ramsay MacDonald	17,439	55.6	1
Aberdeen South	John Paton	6,911	29.0	2
Accrington	Charles Roden Buxton	16,793	45.7	2
Acton	Herbert Alphonsus Baldwin	6,069	28.9	2
Bermondsey West	Alfred Salter	8,298	47.5	2
Bethnal Green North East	Walter Windsor	7,415	45.7	1
Birmingham Ladywood	Robert Dunstan	11,330	46.8	2
Bishop Auckland	Ben Spoor	13,328	51.2	1
Blackburn	John Davies	25,428	23.8	3
Bootle	John Kinley	3,272	13.8	3
Bosworth	Emrys Hughes	8,152	28.9	3
Bournemouth	Minnie Pallister	5,986	19.5	3
Bradford Central	William Leach	14,241	44.6	1
Bradford East	Fred Jowett	13,579	48.1	1
Brigg	David Quibell	10,753	46.4	2
Bristol North	Walter Ayles	10,433	37.5	1
Bute and Northern Ayrshire	Peter Campbell Stephen	9,855	44.4	2
Caerphilly	Morgan Jones	16,535	58.7	1
Cardiff Central	James Ewart Edmunds	8,563	32.0	2
Chatham	Mary Hamilton	5,794	24.1	3
Chelsea	Bertrand Russell	5,047	27.5	2
Chesterfield	George Benson	6,198	25.9	2
Clackmannan and Eastern Stirlingshire	Lauchlin MacNeill Weir	10,492	51.1	1
Colne Valley	Philip Snowden	13,136	40.4	1
Consett	Herbert Dunnico	15,862	52.0	1
Croydon North	Gilbert Foan	10,054	37.0	2
Dewsbury	Ben Riley	8,923	44.4	2
Dunbartonshire	William Martin	11,705	43.0	1
East Renfrewshire	Robert Nichol	9,857	44.6	1
Edinburgh Central	William Graham	13,186	67.9	1
Glasgow Bridgeton	James Maxton	15,735	64.8	1
Glasgow Camlachie	Campbell Stephen	14,143	56.2	1
Glasgow Cathcart	John Primrose Hay	8,884	34.7	2
Glasgow Central	Edward Mitchell	12,976	44.4	2
Glasgow Govan	Neil Maclean	13,987	66.3	1
Glasgow Hillhead	John L. Kinloch	5,059	26.4	2
Glasgow Maryhill	John William Muir	12,508	48.1	1
Glasgow Pollok	John Rankin	6,836	32.8	2
Glasgow Shettleston	John Wheatley	12,624	59.8	1
Glasgow Springburn	George Hardie	14,535	62.3	1
Glasgow St Rollox	James Stewart	15,240	62.3	1
Gloucester	M. Philips Price	8,127	35.7	2
Hackney Central	Ernest E. Hunter	6,354	28.7	3
Hammersmith North	James Patrick Gardner	8,101	41.0	1
Hammersmith South	Wyndham Albery	6,974	36.9	2
Hitchin	Skene Mackay	5,913	26.3	2
Huddersfield	James Hudson	17,430	36.7	1
Ilford	Dan Chater	5,775	18.1	3
Inverness	Andrew D. Kinloch	5,385	34.6	2
Ipswich	Robert Jackson	15,824	50.7	1
Islington East	Ethel Bentham	6,941	26.0	3
Keighley	Hastings Lees-Smith	14,083	49.1	2
Kilmarnock	Robert Climie	10,992	43.2	1
Kingston upon Hull South West	John Arnott	5,973	23.7	3
Lambeth North	Fred Hughes	4,089	21.9	3
Lanark	Thomas Scott Dickson	11,384	50.5	1
Leeds West	Thomas Stamford	11,434	40.7	1
Leicester East	George Banton	13,162	44.8	1
Leyton East	Archibald Church	7,944	39.5	1
Limehouse	Clement Attlee	11,473	68.5	1
Linlithgowshire	Manny Shinwell	13,304	50.9	1
Llandaff and Barry	Thomas F. Worrall	7,871	27.0	3
Lowestoft	Robert Arthur Mellanby	4,788	19.7	3
Maidstone	Seymour Cocks	6,558	24.4	3
Merthyr	R. C. Wallhead	19,511	60.1	1
Mile End	John Scurr	6,219	41.0	1
Montrose Burghs	John Carnegie	7,032	44.7	2
Newcastle-under-Lyme	Josiah Wedgwood	12,881	65.6	1
Newcastle upon Tyne Central	Charles Trevelyan	12,447	52.5	1
Newcastle upon Tyne North	John Beckett	5,374	22.0	3
Norwich	Dorothy Jewson	19,304	20.0	2
Penistone	Rennie Smith	8,329	33.5	2
Reading	Somerville Hastings	16,657	44.8	1
Rutherglen	William Wright	13,021	54.5	1
St Pancras North	James Marley	10,931	43.0	1
Salford West	Alexander Haycock	9,868	38.4	1
Sheffield Attercliffe	Cecil Wilson	13,581	58.7	1
Sheffield Brightside	Arthur Ponsonby	14,741	53.0	1
Southampton	Reginald Sorensen	16,679	16.4	4
Stourbridge	Wilfred Wellock	9,050	24.4	3
Sunderland	David Baxter Lawley	13,707	11.6	5
Swansea East	David Williams	12,735	57.4	1
Upton	Benjamin Walter Gardner	8,656	39.3	1
Walthamstow East	John Gilbert Dale	6,837	34.6	2
Wells	Charles Henry Whitlow	1,713	07.6	3
Westbury	George Ward	4,372	17.4	3
West Dorset	Louie Simpson	7,087	41.2	2
West Renfrewshire	Robert Murray	10,904	48.1	1
West Stirlingshire	Tom Johnston	9,242	51.9	1

All candidates stood for the Labour Party.

=== By-elections, 1923–1924 ===
By-election	Candidate	Votes	%	Position
1924 Westminster Abbey by-election	Fenner Brockway	6,156	27.0	3

Candidate stood for the Labour Party.

=== 1924 general election ===
By-election	Candidate	Votes	%	Position
Aberavon	Ramsay MacDonald	17,724	53.1	1
Aberdeen and Kincardine East	William Sloan Cormack	3,899	24.4	3
Aberdeen North	Frank Herbert Rose	13,249	60.8	1
Aberdeen South	George Archibald	10,699	39.9	2
Accrington	Charles Roden Buxton	18,148	47.1	2
Argyllshire	I. H. MacIver	4,532	22.7	3
Belper	Jack Lees	10,618	41.8	2
Bermondsey West	Alfred Salter	11,578	57.2	1
Birkenhead East	James Coulthard	7,496	26.7	3
Birmingham Erdington	Charles Simmons	11,412	40.5	2
Birmingham Ladywood	Oswald Mosley	13,297	48.9	2
Birmingham Sparkbrook	Sydney Potter	9,759	36.1	2
Bishop Auckland	Ben Spoor	15,786	55.1	1
Blackburn	Mary Hamilton	24,330	21.8	3
Bradford Central	William Leach	16,652	48.3	2
Bradford East	Fred Jowett	15,174	49.9	2
Bradford North	Frank Wise	9,442	32.7	2
Brigg	David Quibell	11,669	43.6	2
Bristol North	Walter Ayles	12,319	40.9	2
Bute and Northern Ayrshire	Peter Campbell Stephen	10,075	38.3	2
Caerphilly	Morgan Jones	17,723	59.0	1
Central Aberdeenshire	J. Newman	3,791	18.4	2
Chesterfield	George Benson	9,206	39.7	2
Clackmannan and Eastern Stirlingshire	Lauchlin MacNeill Weir	13,032	52.6	1
Colchester	Richard Reiss	10,953	43.4	2
Consett	Herbert Dunnico	18,842	55.9	1
Croydon North	Gilbert Foan	10,954	29.7	2
Dewsbury	Benjamin Riley	9,941	41.1	1
Dumfriesshire	Agnes Dollan	6,342	23.0	3
Dunbartonshire	William Martin	12,872	44.2	2
East Renfrewshire	Robert Nichol	10,903	44.3	2
Edinburgh Central	William Graham	13,628	60.5	1
Gateshead	John Beckett	23,514	50.2	1
Glasgow Bridgeton	James Maxton	16,850	61.3	1
Glasgow Camlachie	Campbell Stephen	14,588	50.4	1
Glasgow Cathcart	John Primrose Hay	9,915	35.0	2
Glasgow Central	J. D. White	12,617	40.9	2
Glasgow Govan	Neil Maclean	15,132	63.2	1
Glasgow Hillhead	John L. Kinloch	6,957	32.3	2
Glasgow Maryhill	John William Muir	13,947	47.4	2
Glasgow Kelvingrove	Thomas Archibald Kerr	12,844	41.6	2
Glasgow Pollok	John Rankin	6,749	24.7	2
Glasgow St Rollox	James Stewart	16,299	59.2	1
Glasgow Shettleston	John Wheatley	12,714	51.3	1
Glasgow Springburn	George Hardie	15,635	56.5	1
Gloucester	M. Philips Price	8,005	36.2	2
Greenock	Stephen Kelly	5,874	22.4	3
Hackney Central	Ernest E. Hunter	9,684	36.3	2
Hammersmith North	James Patrick Gardner	10,970	45.9	2
Harwich	Alf Barton	1,604	06.8	3
Huddersfield	James Hudson	19,010	36.3	1
Inverness	T. Henderson	6,863	37.4	2
Ipswich	Robert Jackson	15,791	44.6	2
Keighley	Hastings Lees-Smith	14,105	45.0	1
Kilmarnock	Robert Climie	13,054	47.8	2
Kingston upon Hull South West	John Arnott	7,965	29.2	3
Kinross and Western Perthshire	John MacDiarmid	5,286	28.0	2
Lanark	Thomas Scott Dickson	11,426	43.5	2
Lancaster	Harold Mostyn Watkins	5,572	17.5	3
Leeds West	Thomas Stamford	13,057	42.5	1
Leicester East	George Banton	15,669	49.3	2
Limehouse	Clement Attlee	11,713	57.7	1
Linlithgowshire	Manny Shinwell	14,123	48.9	2
Liverpool Fairfield	Mary Ann Mercer	8,412	37.1	2
Liverpool Kirkdale	Elijah Sandham	9,369	39.4	2
Maidstone	Seymour Cocks	8,192	33.7	2
Merthyr	R. C. Wallhead	19,882	59.8	1
Mile End	John Scurr	8,306	48.5	1
Motherwell	James Barr	12,816	52.1	1
Newcastle-upon-Tyne Central	Charles Trevelyan	14,542	51.6	1
Norwich	Dorothy Jewson	22,931	22.0	4
Paisley	Edward Mitchell	17,057	53.5	1
Penrith and Cockermouth	Fred Tait	5,404	32.1	2
Perth	Cameron Roberts	5,316	20.2	3
Rutherglen	William Wright	13,796	52.1	1
St Pancras North	James Marley	13,171	44.1	2
Salford West	Alexander Haycock	12,369	42.5	2
Sheffield Attercliffe	Cecil Wilson	16,802	63.6	1
Sheffield Brightside	Arthur Ponsonby	17,053	55.4	1
Stalybridge and Hyde	Walter Fowden	12,509	33.7	2
Stirling and Clackmannan Western	Tom Johnston	9,749	49.3	2
Stourbridge	Wilfred Wellock	14,113	34.8	2
Upton	Benjamin Gardner	11,443	46.0	2
Westbury	George Ward	4,731	18.1	3
Western Isles	A. G. Burns	1,454	17.2	3
Weston-super-Mare	Raphael Neft	1,343	04.2	3
West Renfrewshire	Robert Murray	11,252	45.9	2
Willesden East	William Davies Lloyd	7,860	24.7	3

Candidates stood for the Labour Party.

=== By-elections, 1924–1929 ===
By-election	Candidate	Votes	%	Position
1924 Dundee by-election	Tom Johnston	22,973	69.2	1
1925 Ayr Burghs by-election	Patrick Dollan	9,787	35.2	2
1928 Linlithgowshire by-election	Manny Shinwell	14,446	49.1	1
1928 Aberdeen North by-election	William Wedgwood Benn	10,646	52.5	1
1929 North Lanarkshire by-election	Jennie Lee	15,711	57.5	1

Candidates stood for the Labour Party.

=== 1929 general election ===
Constituency	Candidate	Votes	%	Position
Aberdeen North	William Wedgwood Benn	17,826	60.8	1
Aberdeen South	William Henry Porteous Martin	13,856	39.1	2
Argyll	John L. Kinloch	6,001	23.8	3
Ayr Burghs	Clarice Shaw	13,429	36.5	2
Belper	Jack Lees	15,958	43.0	1
Birkenhead East	James Coulthard	11,654	31.8	3
Birmingham Erdington	Charles Simmons	20,665	43.4	1
Birmingham Ladywood	Wilfrid Whiteley	16,447	50.0	1
Blackburn	Mary Agnes Hamilton	37,256	26.1	1
Bradford Central	William Leach	24,876	59.0	1
Bradford East	Frederick William Jowett	21,398	54.7	1
Bute and Northern Ayrshire	Alexander Sloan	14,294	43.8	2
Clackmannan and Eastern Stirlingshire	Lauchlin MacNeill Weir	17,667	53.2	1
Clapham	J. Allen Skinner	9,871	30.5	2
Dumfriesshire	W. H. Marwick	6,687	18.7	3
East Renfrewshire	John Martin Munro	16,924	47.8	2
Edinburgh Central	William Graham	16,762	59.0	1
Fylde	J. Williamson	16,318	35.3	2
Galloway	Hector McNeil	4,903	15.5	3
Glasgow Bridgeton	James Maxton	21,033	67.7	1
Glasgow Camlachie	Campbell Stephen	17,946	53.2	1
Glasgow Cathcart	John Primrose Hay	12,983	36.3	2
Glasgow Hillhead	William Sloan Cormack	10,065	36.7	1
Glasgow Kelvingrove	John Winning	15,173	43.6	2
Glasgow Maryhill	John Smith Clarke	18,311	50.6	1
Glasgow Shettleston	John Wheatley	19,594	60.4	1
Glasgow Springburn	George Hardie	21,079	65.5	1
Glasgow St Rollox	James Stewart	19,445	61.8	1
Huddersfield	James Hindle Hudson	25,966	38.3	1
Keighley	Hastings Lees-Smith	18,412	44.7	1
Kilmarnock	Robert Climie	17,386	48.2	1
Kingston upon Hull South West	John Arnott	14,903	41.2	1
Leeds West	Thomas William Stamford	18,765	41.9	1
Leicester East	Edward Frank Wise	22,533	50.8	1
Leyton East	Fenner Brockway	11,111	42.9	1
Linlithgowshire	Manny Shinwell	18,063	51.6	1
Liverpool Kirkdale	Elijah Sandham	15,222	51.3	1
Merthyr	R. C. Wallhead	22,701	59.6	1
Motherwell	James Barr	16,650	58.0	1
North Lanarkshire	Jennie Lee	19,884	55.9	1
Norwich	Dorothy Jewson	31,040	24.0	3
Oldham	Gordon Lang	34,223	26.2	1
Paisley	James Welsh	22,425	55.8	1
Perth	Helen Gault	8,291	23.5	3
Rutherglen	William Wright	17,538	52.2	1
Salford West	Alexander Haycock	15,647	42.8	1
Sheffield Brightside	Arthur Ponsonby	20,277	55.2	1
Sheffield Hallam	Basil Rawson	12,133	39.1	2
Western Isles	John M. MacDiarmid	3,589	32.5	2
West Renfrewshire	Robert Forgan	14,419	46.5	1
West Stirlingshire	Tom Johnston	15,179	56.7	1
Whitehaven	Morgan Phillips Price	14,034	46.8	1
Widnes	Alexander Gordon Cameron	19,125	51.0	1
Willesden East	William Davies Lloyd	13,977	33.1	2

All candidates stood as part of the Labour Party.

=== By-elections 1929–1931 ===
By-election	Candidate	Votes	%	Position
1930 Glasgow Shettleston by-election	John McGovern	10,699	42.8	1
1930 East Renfrewshire by-election	Thomas Irwin	12,293	33.3	2
1931 Rutherglen by-election	David Hardie	6,736	51.4	1

All candidates except Irwin were endorsed by the Labour Party. Irwin was sponsored by the United Society of Boilermakers.

=== 1931 general election ===
Constituency	Candidate	Votes	%	Position
Bradford East	Fred Jowett	15,779	41.2	2
Bute and Northern Ayrshire	Alexander Sloan	12,758	34.3	2
Camborne	Kate Spurrell	8,280	24.5	3
Clapham	Hilda Browning	7,317	23.0	2
Dumbarton Burghs	David Kirkwood	16,335	51.6	1
Glasgow Bridgeton	James Maxton	16,630	58.2	1
Glasgow Camlachie	Campbell Stephen	15,282	45.3	2
Glasgow Govan	George Buchanan	19,278	58.1	1
Glasgow Kelvingrove	John Winning	12,415	36.6	2
Glasgow Shettleston	John McGovern	16,301	47.8	1
Kilmarnock	John Pollock	14,767	40.4	2
Lanark	Jack Gibson	11,815	36.4	2
Leyton East	Fenner Brockway	10,433	37.6	2
Liverpool Kirkdale	Elijah Sandham	9,531	30.1	2
Merthyr	R. C. Wallhead	24,623	69.4	1
Newcastle-upon-Tyne Central	Charles Trevelyan	12,136	37.3	2
North Lanarkshire	Jennie Lee	19,691	44.7	2
Norwich	Dorothy Jewson	26,537	19.7	4
Peckham	John Beckett	11,217	33.5	2
Perth	Helen Gault	3,705	9.7	3
Stockport	John Thomas Abbott	15,591	11.3	4
Warwick and Leamington	Jim Garton	9,261	19.4	2
West Renfrewshire	Jean Mann	10,203	31.5	2

In addition, Josiah Wedgwood was elected unopposed for Newcastle-under-Lyme. Only those ILP members not accredited by the Labour Party are listed.

=== By-elections, 1931–1935 ===
By-election	Candidate	Votes	%	Position
1932 New Forest and Christchurch by-election	C. A. Smith	5,135	18.0	2
1933 Kilmarnock by-election	John Pollock	7,575	20.9	3
1934 Upton by-election	Fenner Brockway	748	3.5	3
1934 Merthyr by-election	Campbell Stephen	3,508	9.8	3

=== 1935 general election ===
Constituency	Candidate	Votes	%	Position
Aberdeen North	Fraser Macintosh	3,871	11.1	3
Bradford East	Fred Jowett	8,983	26.7	2
Camborne	Kate Spurrell	592	1.9	4
Chorley	Robert Edwards	1,365	3.3	3
Clackmannan and Eastern Stirlingshire	David Gibson	1,513	4.3	4
Glasgow Bridgeton	James Maxton	17,691	65.0	1
Glasgow Camlachie	Campbell Stephen	15,070	47.1	1
Glasgow Gorbals	George Buchanan	22,860	75.0	1
Glasgow Govan	Tom Taylor	4,959	16.0	3
Glasgow Shettleston	John McGovern	18,377	52.8	1
Glasgow Tradeston	James Carmichael	3,423	13.2	3
Kilmarnock	John Pollock	3,582	10.2	3
Lanark	William Carlin	2,583	8.3	3
Merthyr	Claude Stanfield	9,640	32.0	2
North Lanarkshire	Jennie Lee	17,267	37.3	2
Norwich	Fenner Brockway	6,737	5.4	5
Whitehaven	Tom Stephenson	1,004	3.3	3

=== By-elections, 1935–1945 ===
By-election	Candidate	Votes	%	Position
1939 Stretford by-election	Robert Edwards	4,424	15.1	2
1940 Glasgow Pollok by-election	John Nicolson	8,206	11.9	2
1940 East Renfrewshire by-election	Annie Maxton	8,206	19.3	2
1941 Lancaster by-election	Fenner Brockway	5,418	19.5	3
1941 Edinburgh Central by-election	Tom Taylor	1,950	29.0	2
1942 Cardiff East by-election	Fenner Brockway	3,311	24.8	2
1942 Glasgow Cathcart by-election	James Carmichael	2,493	13.8	3
1943 Bristol Central by-election	John McNair	830	7.4	3
1943 Woolwich West by-election	Tom Colyer	3,419	27.2	2
1943 Acton by-election	Walter Padley	2,336	28.1	2
1944 Bilston by-election	Arthur Eaton	9,344	49.1	2
1945 Newport by-election	Robert Edwards	13,722	45.5	2

=== 1945 general election ===
Constituency	Candidate	Votes	%	Position
Bilston	Arthur Eaton	849	1.8	3
Bradford East	Will Ballantine	5,105	14.6	3
Glasgow Bridgeton	James Maxton	13,220	66.4	1
Glasgow Camlachie	Campbell Stephen	15,558	57.7	1
Glasgow Shettleston	John McGovern	11,947	35.5	1

=== By-elections, 1945–1950 ===
By-election	Candidate	Votes	%	Position
1946 Battersea North by-election	Hugo Dewar	240	1.5	3
1946 Glasgow Bridgeton by-election	James Carmichael	6,351	34.3	1
1947 Liverpool Edge Hill by-election	David Gibson	154	0.7	4
1948 Glasgow Camlachie by-election	Annie Maxton	1,622	6.4	3

=== 1950 general election ===
Constituency	Candidate	Votes	%	Position
Burnley	Dan Carradice	295	0.5	4
Glasgow Bridgeton	Robert Duncan	1,974	5.8	3
Glasgow Shettleston	Jim Graham	1,031	2.5	4
Newcastle-upon-Tyne Central	Fred Barton	812	2.1	3

=== By-elections, 1950–1951 ===
By-election	Candidate	Votes	%	Position
1950 Glasgow Scotstoun by-election	David Gibson	680	1.9	3
1951 Ormskirk by-election	Fred Barton	689	2.0	3

=== 1951 general election ===
Constituency	Candidate	Votes	%	Position
Newcastle-upon-Tyne Central	Fred Barton	1,006	2.5	3
Glasgow Bridgeton	Robert Duncan	1,796	5.4	3
Glasgow Shettleston	Jim Graham	1,195	2.8	3

=== 1955 general election ===
Constituency	Candidate	Votes	%	Position
Bermondsey	Stan Birkett	715	2.5	3
Glasgow Bridgeton	George Stone	2,619	7.4	3

=== By-elections, 1955–1959 ===
By-election	Candidate	Votes	%	Position
1957 East Ham North by-election	Bill Christopher	458	2.1	4
1958 Glasgow Kelvingrove by-election	William Park	587	2.8	4
1958 Islington North by-election	Jim McKie	576	2.9	3

=== 1959 general election ===
Constituency	Candidate	Votes	%	Position
Glasgow Kelvingrove	William Park	740	3.0	3
Walthamstow East	Bill Christopher	183	0.5	4

=== By-elections, 1959–1964 ===
By-election	Candidate	Votes	%	Position
1961 Glasgow Bridgeton by-election	George Stone	586	3.1	4

=== 1966 general election ===
Constituency	Candidate	Votes	%	Position
Leyton	Bill Hanley	441	0.9	4

=== 1970 general election ===
Constituency	Candidate	Votes	%	Position
Halifax	Alistair Graham	847	1.7	3

=== February 1974 general election ===
Constituency	Candidate	Votes	%	Position
St Helens	M. Pike	991	1.8	4
