= General Adair =

General Adair may refer to:

- Allan Adair (1897–1988), British Army major general
- Charles Adair (Royal Marines officer) (1822–1897), Royal Marines general
- William Adair (1850–1931), Royal Marines general
