= John Train =

John Train may refer to:

- John Train (investment advisor) (1928–2022), investment advisor and writer
- John Train (politician) (1873–1942), Unionist Party (Scotland) MP for Glasgow Cathcart
- John Butler Train, pseudonym of singer Phil Ochs (1940-1976)
