= 1946 Glasgow Cathcart by-election =

UK parliamentary by-election

The 1946 Glasgow Cathcart by-election was held on 12 February 1946. The by-election was held due to the death of the incumbent Conservative MP, Francis Beattie. It was won by the Conservative candidate John Henderson.

By-election 1946: Glasgow Cathcart
Party	Candidate	Votes	%	±%
Unionist	John Henderson	13,695	52.5	−6.3
Labour	Alexander Burns Mackay	9,689	37.2	−4.0
SNP	William Taylor	2,700	10.4	New
Majority		4,006	15.3	−2.3
Turnout		26,084		
Unionist hold		Swing	−1.2	
