= John Maxton =

Scottish Labour politician (1936–2025)

The Right Honourable The Lord Maxton
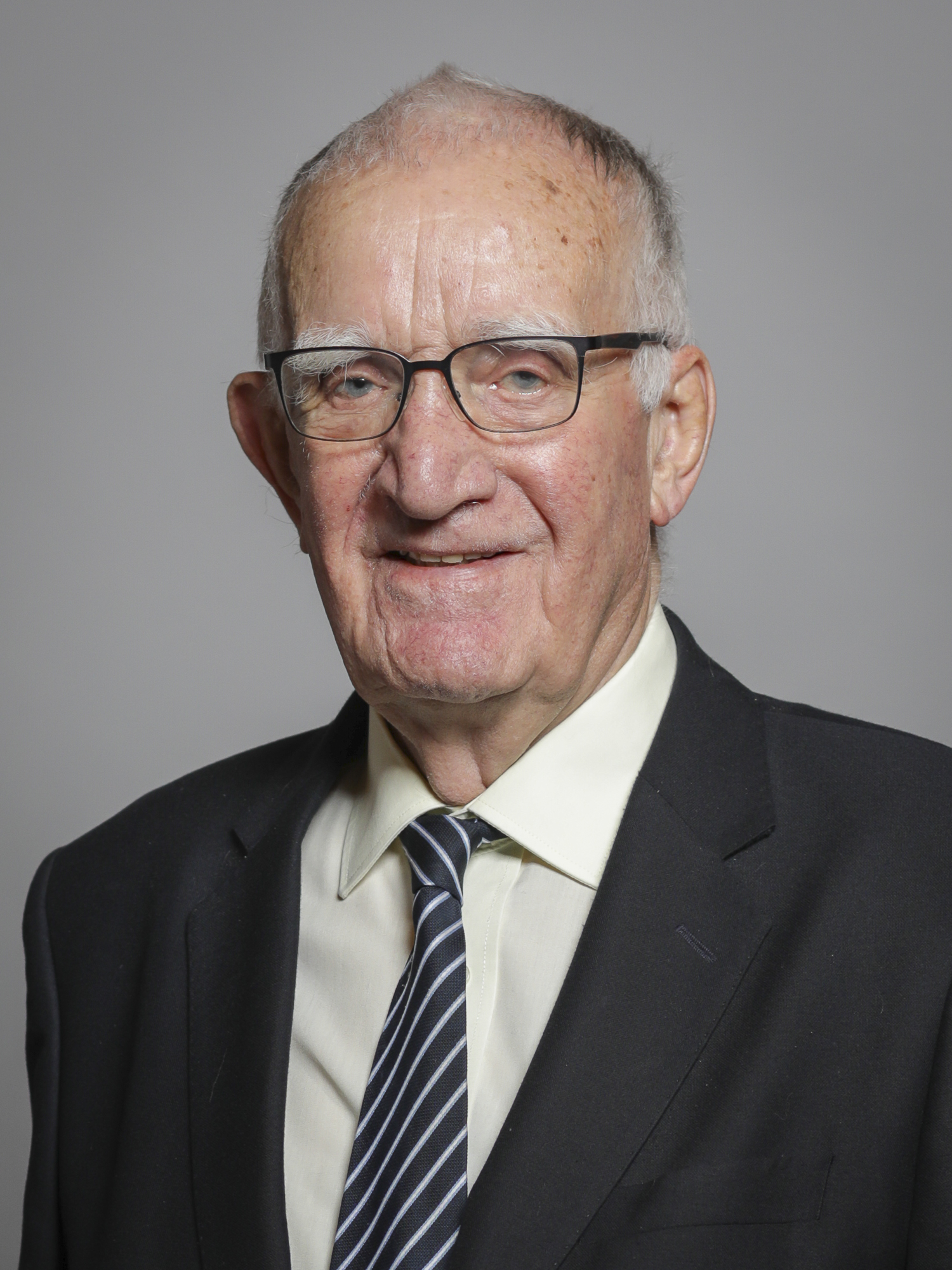
- Maxton in 2019

Member of the House of Lords
- Lord Temporal
- Life peerage 17 June 2004 – 5 May 2025

Member of Parliament for Glasgow Cathcart
- In office 3 May 1979 – 14 May 2001
- Preceded by: Teddy Taylor
- Succeeded by: Tom Harris

Personal details
- Born: 5 May 1936
- Died: 20 November 2025 (aged 89)
- Party: Labour
- Education: University College, Oxford

John Alston Maxton, Baron Maxton (5 May 1936 – 20 November 2025) was a Scottish Labour Party politician. From 1979 to 2001, Maxton was a backbencher Member of Parliament (MP) in the House of Commons.

== Early life ==
Maxton was born on 5 May 1936, and was a nephew of the former Independent Labour Party leader and World War I conscientious objector, James Maxton. His father, also named John Maxton, was also a conscientious objector in World War I, and the younger John Maxton was himself a conscientious objector from 1955 to 1957, working on building sites and in farming. He was educated at Lord Williams's Grammar School, Thame, and subsequently attended University College, Oxford.

== Political career ==
Maxton joined the Labour Party in 1970 and became a prominent campaigner as vice-chairman of the group Scottish Labour Against the Market during the 1975 referendum on continuing British membership of the Common Market. He was selected to oppose the sitting MP, the Shadow Secretary of State for Scotland, Teddy Taylor, at the 1979 general election in the Glasgow Cathcart constituency. The changing demographics of the area and Labour's increasing popularity in Scotland made it a winnable seat, and Maxton's victory was made more likely by the Conservative Party's strident opposition to the Scottish National Party, which drove some of its voters back to Labour.

Maxton was the only Labour candidate at that election to gain a seat the Conservatives had won at the previous general election (October 1974). In Parliament, he allied with the soft left in the Tribune Group, and voted against the Falklands War. In 1983, his constituency was redrawn to his disadvantage, but Maxton ruled out a move to any more favourable neighbouring areas; he therefore notionally gained his seat from the Conservatives again in the 1983 general election. Maxton was a popular backbencher, but did not obtain much support when he stood for election to the Labour shadow cabinet. He was Labour's Scottish Whip in 1985 and a spokesman on Scottish Affairs from 1985 to 1992.

He stood down from the House of Commons at the 2001 general election and was given a life peerage on 17 June 2004, as Baron Maxton, of Blackwaterfoot in Ayrshire and Arran. Maxton retired from the Lords on his 89th birthday, 5 May 2025.

== Death ==
Maxton died on 20 November 2025, at the age of 89.

Parliament of the United Kingdom
Preceded by Teddy Taylor	Member of Parliament for Glasgow Cathcart; 1979–2001	Succeeded by Tom Harris
