= Glasgow Cathcart (UK Parliament constituency) =

Parliamentary constituency in the United Kingdom, 1918–2005

- Former burgh constituency for the House of Commons
- Subdivisions of Scotland: Glasgow City

1918–2005
- Seats: One
- Created from: Mid Lanarkshire
- Replaced by: Glasgow South

Glasgow Cathcart was a burgh constituency represented in the House of Commons of the Parliament of the United Kingdom from 1918 until 2005, when it was replaced by the larger Glasgow South constituency.

It elected one Member of Parliament (MP) using the first-past-the-post voting system.

== Boundaries ==
1950–1974: The County of the City of Glasgow wards of Cathcart and Langside, and part of Govanhill ward.

1974–1983: The County of the City of Glasgow ward of Cathcart, and part of Langside ward.

1983–1997: The City of Glasgow District electoral divisions of King's Park/Aitkenhead, Linn Park/Castlemilk, and Pollokshaws/Newlands.

1997–2005: The City of Glasgow District electoral divisions of Battlefield/Croftfoot, Carnwadric/Newlands, and Castlemilk/Carmunnock.

== History ==
For generations, Glasgow Cathcart was an extremely safe Conservative seat and for fifty-six years, the constituency always returned a Conservative MP. The area was the wealthiest part of the city and was mainly inhabited by "well to do" business families and contained large detached houses. It was Glasgow's equivalent of Kensington and Chelsea in London. However, when Labour won the general election in 1964, Glasgow had a lot of slum clearance and a lot of council housing was built in the Cathcart area, and areas which had previously been fields now housed the families from the old slums. These families naturally voted Labour and time and time, again the Conservative majorities dwindled. In 1966, the Conservative majority fell to a record low of 1,200 votes.

In 1970, the Conservatives increased their majority to around 5,000 but at the next two general elections in 1974 it soon fell again. In 1979, when Margaret Thatcher took office, the Conservatives lost the seat to Labour, against the national trend where there was a large swing to the Conservatives. After redrawn boundaries were made in 1983, the seat was notionally Conservative but like 1979 the seat went against the national trend and the Labour MP increased his majority. From 1983 to 1997, the Conservatives lost more ground time after time except for a small improvement in 1992 (inline with the national trend in Scotland, which ran counter to that across the United Kingdom). In 1997, Labour won a landslide victory in which the Conservatives lost all their seats in Scotland, and the seat became a safe Labour seat.

Since then, the Conservatives had fallen into third and fourth place. The seat still has more Conservative voters than any other Glasgow constituency, but only 5,000 at the last election when it was replaced by Glasgow South.

== Members of Parliament ==
| Election | Member | Party |
|---|---|---|
| 1918 | John Pratt | Coalition Liberal |
| 1922 | John Pratt | National Liberal |
| 1922 | John Primrose Hay | Labour |
| 1923 | Robert MacDonald | Unionist |
| 1929 | Sir John Train | Unionist |
| 1942 by-election | Francis Beattie | Unionist |
| 1946 by-election | John Henderson | Unionist |
| 1964 | Teddy Taylor | Unionist |
| 1965 | Teddy Taylor | Conservative |
| 1979 | John Maxton | Labour |
| 2001 | Thomas Harris | Labour |

== Election results ==
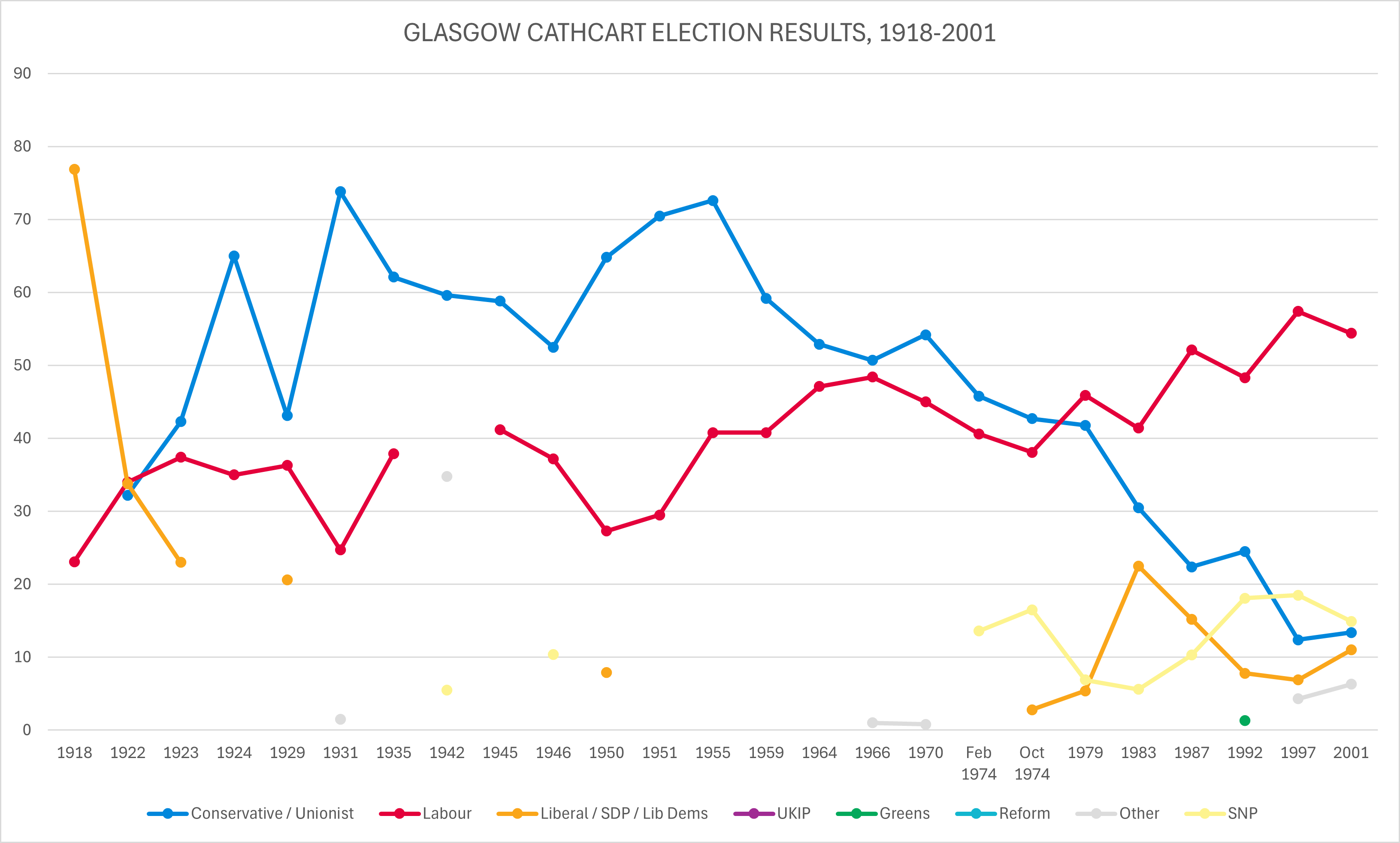
Election results 1950-2024

=== Elections in the 1910s ===
General election 1918: Glasgow Cathcart
| Party | | Candidate | Votes | % |
|---|---|---|---|---|
| C | Coalition Liberal | John Pratt | 16,310 | 76.9 |
| | Labour | Gavin Brown Clark | 4,899 | 23.1 |
| Majority | | | 11,411 | 53.8 |
| Turnout | | | 21,209 | 61.8 |
| Registered electors | | | 34,293 | |
| | National Liberal win (new seat) | | | |
C indicates candidate endorsed by the coalition government.

=== Elections in the 1920s ===
General election 1922: Glasgow Cathcart
| Party | Candidate | Votes | % | ±% |
|---|---|---|---|---|
| Labour | John Primrose Hay | 9,137 | 34.0 | +10.9 |
| National Liberal | Andrew Duncan | 9,104 | 33.8 | −43.1 |
| Unionist | Robert MacDonald | 8,661 | 32.2 | New |
| Majority | | 33 | 0.2 | N/A |
| Turnout | | 26,902 | 81.0 | +19.2 |
| Registered electors | | 33,198 | | |
| Labour gain from National Liberal | | Swing | +27.0 | |

General election 1923: Glasgow Cathcart
| Party | Candidate | Votes | % | ±% |
|---|---|---|---|---|
| Unionist | Robert MacDonald | 10,817 | 42.3 | +10.1 |
| Labour | John Primrose Hay | 8,884 | 34.7 | +0.7 |
| Liberal | Thomas Graham Robertson | 5,894 | 23.0 | −10.8 |
| Majority | | 1,933 | 7.6 | N/A |
| Turnout | | 25,595 | 77.5 | −3.5 |
| Registered electors | | 33,040 | | |
| Unionist gain from Labour | | Swing | +4.7 | |

General election 1924: Glasgow Cathcart
| Party | Candidate | Votes | % | ±% |
|---|---|---|---|---|
| Unionist | Robert MacDonald | 18,440 | 65.0 | +22.7 |
| Labour | John Primrose Hay | 9,915 | 35.0 | +0.3 |
| Majority | | 8,525 | 30.0 | +22.4 |
| Turnout | | 28,355 | 80.8 | +3.3 |
| Registered electors | | 35,076 | | |
| Unionist hold | | Swing | +11.2 | |

General election 1929: Glasgow Cathcart
| Party | Candidate | Votes | % | ±% |
|---|---|---|---|---|
| Unionist | John Train | 15,435 | 43.1 | −21.9 |
| Labour | John Primrose Hay | 12,983 | 36.3 | +1.3 |
| Liberal | James Gray | 7,388 | 20.6 | New |
| Majority | | 2,452 | 6.8 | −23.2 |
| Turnout | | 35,806 | 78.6 | −2.2 |
| Registered electors | | 45,545 | | |
| Unionist hold | | Swing | −11.6 | |

=== Elections in the 1930s ===
General election 1931: Glasgow Cathcart
| Party | Candidate | Votes | % | ±% |
|---|---|---|---|---|
| Unionist | John Train | 26,642 | 73.8 | +30.7 |
| Labour | A. L. Ritchie | 8,919 | 24.7 | −11.6 |
| New Party | J. Mellick | 529 | 1.5 | New |
| Majority | | 17,723 | 49.1 | +42.3 |
| Turnout | | 36,090 | 79.5 | +0.9 |
| Unionist hold | | Swing | | |

General election 1935: Glasgow Cathcart
| Party | Candidate | Votes | % | ±% |
|---|---|---|---|---|
| Unionist | John Train | 21,331 | 62.1 | −11.7 |
| Labour | Alasdair Alpin MacGregor | 12,995 | 37.9 | +13.2 |
| Majority | | 8,336 | 24.2 | −24.9 |
| Turnout | | 34,326 | 74.3 | −5.2 |
| Unionist hold | | Swing | −12.5 | |

=== Elections in the 1940s ===
By-election 1942: Glasgow Cathcart
| Party | Candidate | Votes | % | ±% |
|---|---|---|---|---|
| Unionist | Francis Beattie | 10,786 | 59.6 | −2.5 |
| Independent Progressive | William Douglas Home | 3,807 | 21.0 | New |
| Ind. Labour Party | James Carmichael | 2,493 | 13.8 | N/A |
| SNP | William Whyte | 1,000 | 5.5 | New |
| Majority | | 6,979 | 38.6 | +14.4 |
| Turnout | | 18,086 | | |
| Unionist hold | | Swing | | |

General election 1945: Glasgow Cathcart
| Party | Candidate | Votes | % | ±% |
|---|---|---|---|---|
| Unionist | Francis Beattie | 18,472 | 58.8 | −3.3 |
| Labour | N. Jackson | 12,923 | 41.2 | +3.3 |
| Majority | | 5,549 | 17.6 | −6.6 |
| Turnout | | 31,395 | 67.7 | −6.6 |
| Unionist hold | | Swing | −3.3 | |

By-election 1946: Glasgow Cathcart
| Party | Candidate | Votes | % | ±% |
|---|---|---|---|---|
| Unionist | John Henderson | 13,695 | 52.5 | −6.3 |
| Labour | Alexander Burns Mackay | 9,689 | 37.2 | −4.0 |
| SNP | William Taylor | 2,700 | 10.4 | New |
| Majority | | 4,006 | 15.3 | −2.3 |
| Turnout | | 26,084 | | |
| Unionist hold | | Swing | −1.2 | |

=== Elections in the 1950s ===
General election 1950: Glasgow Cathcart
| Party | Candidate | Votes | % | ±% |
|---|---|---|---|---|
| Unionist | John Henderson | 24,341 | 64.8 | +6.0 |
| Labour | Ian Rosslyn Mitchell | 10,269 | 27.3 | −13.9 |
| Liberal | Malcolm I Shields | 2,984 | 7.9 | New |
| Majority | | 14,072 | 37.5 | +19.9 |
| Turnout | | 37,594 | 83.8 | +16.1 |
| Unionist hold | | Swing | +10.0 | |

General election 1951: Glasgow Cathcart
| Party | Candidate | Votes | % | ±% |
|---|---|---|---|---|
| Unionist | John Henderson | 26,125 | 70.5 | +5.7 |
| Labour | Agnes M. Patrick | 10,912 | 29.5 | +2.2 |
| Majority | | 15,213 | 41.0 | +3.5 |
| Turnout | | 37,037 | 82.5 | −1.3 |
| Unionist hold | | Swing | +1.8 | |

General election 1955: Glasgow Cathcart
| Party | Candidate | Votes | % | ±% |
|---|---|---|---|---|
| Unionist | John Henderson | 25,265 | 72.6 | +2.1 |
| Labour | L.P. Thomas | 9,514 | 27.4 | −2.1 |
| Majority | | 15,751 | 45.2 | +4.2 |
| Turnout | | 34,779 | 75.7 | −6.8 |
| Unionist hold | | Swing | +2.1 | |

General election 1959: Glasgow Cathcart
| Party | Candidate | Votes | % | ±% |
|---|---|---|---|---|
| Unionist | John Henderson | 30,743 | 59.2 | −13.4 |
| Labour | James Jarvie | 21,169 | 40.8 | +13.4 |
| Majority | | 9,574 | 18.4 | −26.8 |
| Turnout | | 51,912 | 80.3 | +4.6 |
| Unionist hold | | Swing | −13.4 | |

=== Elections in the 1960s ===
General election 1964: Glasgow Cathcart
| Party | Candidate | Votes | % | ±% |
|---|---|---|---|---|
| Unionist | Teddy Taylor | 27,299 | 52.9 | −6.3 |
| Labour | Ellen McCulloch | 24,294 | 47.1 | +6.3 |
| Majority | | 3,005 | 5.8 | −12.6 |
| Turnout | | 51,593 | 79.3 | −1.0 |
| Unionist hold | | Swing | −6.3 | |

General election 1966: Glasgow Cathcart
| Party | Candidate | Votes | % | ±% |
|---|---|---|---|---|
| Conservative | Teddy Taylor | 26,549 | 50.7 | −2.2 |
| Labour | Frederick L Forrester | 25,330 | 48.4 | +1.3 |
| Anti-Vivisection | Gabriel A Barlow | 516 | 1.0 | New |
| Majority | | 1,219 | 2.3 | −3.5 |
| Turnout | | 52,395 | 79.7 | +0.4 |
| Conservative hold | | Swing | −1.8 | |

=== Elections in the 1970s ===
General election 1970: Glasgow Cathcart
| Party | Candidate | Votes | % | ±% |
|---|---|---|---|---|
| Conservative | Teddy Taylor | 29,093 | 54.2 | +3.5 |
| Labour | Donald C.H. Mackay | 24,188 | 45.0 | −3.4 |
| Independent | Joseph McDonagh | 419 | 0.8 | New |
| Majority | | 4,905 | 9.2 | +6.9 |
| Turnout | | 53,700 | 74.4 | −5.3 |
| Conservative hold | | Swing | +3.5 | |

General election February 1974: Glasgow Cathcart
| Party | Candidate | Votes | % | ±% |
|---|---|---|---|---|
| Conservative | Teddy Taylor | 18,247 | 45.8 | −8.4 |
| Labour | P.T. McCann | 16,152 | 40.6 | −4.4 |
| SNP | Alex Ewing | 5,410 | 13.6 | New |
| Majority | | 2,095 | 5.2 | −4.0 |
| Turnout | | 39,809 | 80.7 | +6.3 |
| Conservative hold | | Swing | −2.0 | |

General election October 1974: Glasgow Cathcart
| Party | Candidate | Votes | % | ±% |
|---|---|---|---|---|
| Conservative | Teddy Taylor | 16,301 | 42.7 | −3.1 |
| Labour | J.E. Carnegie | 14,544 | 38.1 | −2.5 |
| SNP | Alex Ewing | 6,292 | 16.5 | +2.9 |
| Liberal | Henry Wills | 1,058 | 2.8 | New |
| Majority | | 1,757 | 4.6 | −0.6 |
| Turnout | | 38,195 | 76.7 | −4.0 |
| Conservative hold | | Swing | −0.3 | |

General election 1979: Glasgow Cathcart
| Party | Candidate | Votes | % | ±% |
|---|---|---|---|---|
| Labour | John Maxton | 17,550 | 45.9 | +7.8 |
| Conservative | Teddy Taylor | 15,950 | 41.8 | −0.9 |
| SNP | Alex Ewing | 2,653 | 6.9 | −9.6 |
| Liberal | Henry Wills | 2,042 | 5.4 | +2.6 |
| Majority | | 1,600 | 4.1 | N/A |
| Turnout | | 38,105 | 78.6 | +1.9 |
| Labour gain from Conservative | | Swing | +4.4 | |

=== Elections in the 1980s ===
General election 1983: Glasgow Cathcart
| Party | Candidate | Votes | % | ±% |
|---|---|---|---|---|
| Labour | John Maxton | 16,037 | 41.4 | −0.7 |
| Conservative | Douglas J. May | 11,807 | 30.5 | −15.8 |
| SDP | Keir Bloomer | 8,710 | 22.5 | +16.8 |
| SNP | William Steven | 2,151 | 5.6 | −1.3 |
| Majority | | 4,230 | 10.9 | +6.7 |
| Turnout | | 38,705 | 75.8 | −2.8 |
| Labour hold | | Swing | +7.5 | |

General election 1987: Glasgow Cathcart
| Party | Candidate | Votes | % | ±% |
|---|---|---|---|---|
| Labour | John Maxton | 19,623 | 52.1 | +10.7 |
| Conservative | William Harvey | 8,420 | 22.4 | −8.1 |
| SDP | Moira Craig | 5,722 | 15.2 | −7.3 |
| SNP | William Steven | 3,883 | 10.3 | +4.7 |
| Majority | | 11,203 | 29.7 | +18.8 |
| Turnout | | 37,648 | 76.4 | +0.6 |
| Labour hold | | Swing | +9.4 | |

=== Elections in the 1990s ===
General election 1992: Glasgow Cathcart
| Party | Candidate | Votes | % | ±% |
|---|---|---|---|---|
| Labour | John Maxton | 16,265 | 48.3 | −3.8 |
| Conservative | John Young | 8,264 | 24.5 | +2.1 |
| SNP | William Steven | 6,107 | 18.1 | +7.8 |
| Liberal Democrats | George C. Dick | 2,614 | 7.8 | −7.4 |
| Green | Kay M. Allan | 441 | 1.3 | New |
| Majority | | 8,001 | 23.8 | −5.9 |
| Turnout | | 33,691 | 75.2 | −1.2 |
| Labour hold | | Swing | -3.0 | |

The boundaries of the seat were significantly re-drawn between 1992 and 1997.

General election 1997: Glasgow Cathcart
| Party | Candidate | Votes | % | ±% |
|---|---|---|---|---|
| Labour | John Maxton | 19,158 | 57.4 | |
| SNP | Maire Whitehead | 6,913 | 18.5 | |
| Conservative | Alastair J. Muir | 4,248 | 12.4 | |
| Liberal Democrats | Callan Dick | 2,302 | 6.9 | |
| ProLife Alliance | Zofia Indyk | 687 | 2.0 | |
| Scottish Socialist | James Stevenson | 458 | 1.3 | |
| Referendum | Strang Haldane | 344 | 1.0 | |
| Majority | | 12,965 | 38.9 | |
| Turnout | | 33,390 | 67.6 | |
| Labour win (new seat) | | | | |

=== Elections in the 2000s ===
General election 2001: Glasgow Cathcart
| Party | Candidate | Votes | % | ±% |
|---|---|---|---|---|
| Labour | Tom Harris | 14,902 | 54.4 | −3.0 |
| SNP | Josephine U. Docherty | 4,086 | 14.9 | −3.6 |
| Conservative | Richard Cook | 3,662 | 13.4 | +1.0 |
| Liberal Democrats | Tom Henery | 3,006 | 11.0 | +4.1 |
| Scottish Socialist | James Stevenson | 1,730 | 6.3 | New |
| Majority | | 10,816 | 39.5 | +0.6 |
| Turnout | | 27,386 | 52.6 | −15.0 |
| Labour hold | | Swing | | |

== See also ==
- Glasgow Cathcart (Scottish Parliament constituency)
