= William Taylor (ophthalmologist) =

Scottish ophthalmologist

William Oswald Gibson Taylor FRCPGLAS (16 March 1912 – 4 September 1989) was a Scottish consultant ophthalmologist who became a leading expert on albinism. In 1979 he founded the Albinism Fellowship in the United Kingdom.

== Education and early career ==
William Taylor graduated from the University of Glasgow, (MB, ChB) in 1934. Following graduation, Taylor decided to specialise in ophthalmology, working at the Glasgow Eye Infirmary. His research interests began in 1938 at Moorfields Eye Hospital in London. In 1940 he joined the British Army and served as an ophthalmologist in East Africa and Scotland during World War II. In 1945 he became a Fellow of the Royal College of Physicians and Surgeons of Glasgow.

In February 1946 he was the unsuccessful Scottish National Party candidate at the 1946 Glasgow Cathcart by-election to become member of parliament for the Glasgow Cathcart (UK Parliament constituency). Later that year he was appointed as consultant ophthalmologist at Kilmarnock Infirmary in Ayrshire.

== Albinism ==
Over thirty years Taylor developed the orthoptic department into a 36-bed unit with three consultants and research facilities. He published numerous scientific papers on various subjects, notably epicanthus, colour vision and albinism. Through his research on colour vision, Taylor developed a specific interest in albinism. He became one of the world's leading experts on the subject; continuing his research until his death at age 77.

In 1979 he established the Albinism Fellowship to provide information, advice and support for people with albinism, their families and other interested parties. He travelled the world as the international organiser of the Albinism Fellowship.

== Awards ==
- Mary Harkness prize in 1963.
- William Mackenzie Medal in 1977.
- Edridge Green prize in 1978 from the Royal College of Ophthalmologists.
