= T. B. S. Adair =

British politician

Rear-Admiral Thomas Benjamin Stratton Adair (6 November 1861 – 12 August 1928) was a British Royal Navy officer and Unionist MP for Glasgow Shettleston from December 1918 to October 1922.

Adair was the son of General Sir Charles William Adair. He entered the Navy in 1874, was promoted to the rank of commander on 1 January 1894, and to captain on 31 December 1899. From 1900 to 1902 he was a member of the Navy's Ordnance Committee. He was appointed in command of the second class protected cruiser HMS Gladiator on 22 September 1902, serving with her in the Mediterranean Fleet.

In 1906, as captain of HMS Montagu, he grounded the battleship at Shutter Point, Lundy Island, in a thick fog during naval manoeuvres. Despite extensive efforts, the ship could not be salvaged, and was dismantled in situ. Adair and his navigation officer were court-martialled for the stranding; Adair was sentenced to be severely reprimanded and dismissed from ship. His naval career was effectively ended by the incident.

He retired the following year and was advanced to rear-admiral on the retired list. After his retirement, he was Head of the Ordnance Department of W. Beardmore & Co. Ltd, Parkhead Steelworks, Glasgow.

He was elected as a supporter of David Lloyd George's coalition government for Glasgow Shettleston in December 1918, serving until 1922.

Parliament of the United Kingdom
New constituency	Member of Parliament for Glasgow Shettleston; 1918 – 1922	Succeeded by John Wheatley
