= Robert MacDonald (British politician) =

Robert MacDonald (1875 – 18 January 1949) was Unionist Party (Scotland) MP for Glasgow Cathcart from 1923 to 1929.

MacDonald was born in 1875 in Glasgow to William MacDonald, an engineer. MacDonald was a piano manufacturer. He was a Conservative, sitting on Glasgow City Council from 1914 to 1923, and was a justice of peace for the city. He first stood for Parliament in Cathcart in 1922, was elected in 1923 and 1924, and retired in May 1929. He had declined to seek reselection on grounds of ill-health.

Parliament of the United Kingdom
Preceded by John Primrose Hay	Member of Parliament for Glasgow Cathcart; 1923 – 1929	Succeeded by Sir John Train
