= John Henderson (Conservative politician) =

Scottish Conservative politician

Sir John Henderson DL JP (12 July 1888 – 28 May 1975) was a Scottish Conservative party politician.

The son of John Henderson and Ellen Shiels, Henderson was educated at the Martyrs' Public School in Glasgow. He married Nessie Brander of Crosshill in Glasgow in 1918. The couple had two children, a son and a daughter. A business man, Henderson was chairman of his own produce importation company, J. Henderson Ltd.. He was a member of the Glasgow Corporation, from 1926 to 1946 and was a Justice of the Peace and Police Judge for the City of Glasgow.

Henderson was elected to the House of Commons at a by-election in 1946, as Member of Parliament for Glasgow Cathcart. He held his seat until he retired from Parliament at the 1964 general election. In parliament, he served as a Member of Inter-Parliamentary Delegations to Finland, Israel, Austria, West Germany, Belgium and Czechoslovakia. He was Chairman of the Scottish Unionist and National Liberals' Committee and of the Scottish Fact and Faith Films Society, and President of the International Council for Christian Leadership.

Henderson was knighted in 1964. His wife died in 1971 and, in 1972, he married Margaret Whiteley, a widow. He died on 28 May 1975.

Parliament of the United Kingdom
Preceded by Francis Beattie	Member of Parliament for Glasgow Cathcart; 1946–1964	Succeeded by Teddy Taylor
