= Francis Beattie (British politician) =

Scottish politician

Francis Beattie (1885–28 December 1945) was Unionist Party (Scotland) MP for Glasgow Cathcart. Beattie won it at a by-election in 1942, was re-elected in 1945, and he died in a road accident later that year.

Beattie was a businessman who was chairman of William Beattie Limited and of various other bread bakeries in Scotland.

During the First World War, he served in the 9th (Glasgow Highland) Battalion, Highland Light Infantry, reaching the rank of brevet major and was mentioned in despatches. During the Second World War, he was Deputy Director of Emergency Bread Supplies, and Trade Adviser on Bread Supplies for Scotland, Ministry of Food until 1942.

Parliament of the United Kingdom
Preceded by Sir John Train	Member of Parliament for Glasgow Cathcart; 1942 – 1945	Succeeded by John Henderson
