= Fred Hammill =

British trade union activist, and a co-founder of the Independent Labour Party

Frederick Parkin Hammill
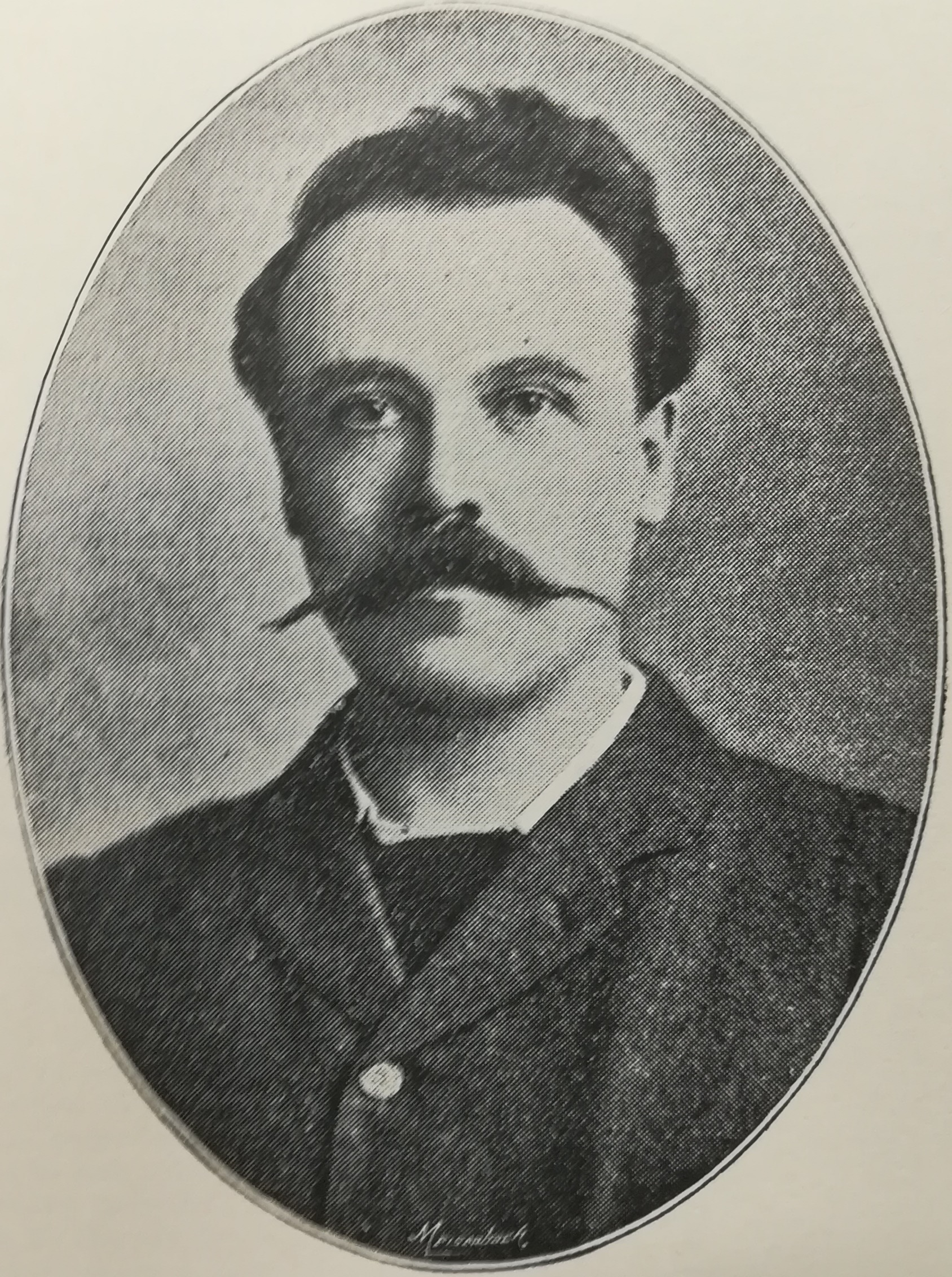
- Hammill in 1895
- Born: 4 May 1856; Leeds, U.K.
- Died: 8 July 1901 (aged 45)
- Occupation: Trade union activist

Frederick Parkin Hammill (4 May 1856 - 8 July 1901) was a British trade union activist, and a co-founder of the Independent Labour Party.

== Career ==
Known generally as "Fred", Hammill was born in Leeds on 4 May 1856, trained as an engineer, and moved to London to work at the Royal Arsenal in Woolwich, where he became a well-known labour activist and trade unionist.

Hammill spoke in defence of John Burns in trials after the 1887 Trafalgar Square Riot, was active in the London Trades Council (seconding Burns's support for the 1891 Scottish rail strike) and in the TUC, and he would speak indoors and outdoors to crowds of up to 6,000 people. He joined the Fabian Society in the early 1890s.

In 1891 Hammill organised a strike of London bus and tram workers on pay and hours, and he was one of the founders of the Independent Labour Party. In 1893 he spoke at a demonstration and rally in Trafalgar Square on workers’ rights. Strongly associated with Tom Mann and with Will Crooks' Poplar-based Labour movement, Hammill helped establish the Woolwich ILP in 1894, with Robert Banner.

In 1894, Hammill became a full-time organiser for the Fabian Society in Durham. A member of the Amalgamated Society of Engineers (ASE), in July 1895 Hammill was the first socialist to stand for election to parliament as an ILP candidate in Newcastle. Unsuccessful, he changed tack to run a pub (The Swan in Topcliffe in Yorkshire), for which he was criticised politically.

He was elected to the Thirsk Rural District Council in 1901.

He died on 8 July 1901 from influenza, aged 45 years.

== Personal life ==
When Fred Hammill was a child, his family lived in a pub (the Grey Mare Inn, 132 Low Road, Hunslet) in Leeds, run by his father Thomas.

Hammill married Ada Peel (9 July 1860 – c. Feb 1940) and they had three children (Arthur Earnest (1880-1945), Helen (1882-1904), Gertrude Wright (1888-1959)). After moving to London from Leeds, they lived at 25 Coxwell Road in Plumstead for a period (c. 1890 to 1892).

Ada's father Joseph Peel was an inn-keeper.

== Works ==
- An address at the first annual conference of the National Vehicular Traffic Workers’ Union, 1892. (pamphlet) [1892].
- The Necessity of an Independent Labour Party: speech at the annual meeting of the Newcastle Independent Labour Party held at Newcastle on 3 January 1893. (pamphlet), UK: Newcastle upon Tyne: Dowling [1893].
- The Claims and Progress of Labor Representation. (pamphlet), UK: Newcastle upon Tyne: Dowling [1894].
- Out of Work: The Problem of the Unemployed. (pamphlet), UK: Newcastle upon Tyne: Dowling [1894].
- "Onward to Victory" (a chapter in) The New Party (book), pages 49 to 53, Book Authors: Andrew Reid; Walter Crane. Publisher: Hodder Brothers, 18 New Bridge Street, E.C., Edinburgh and London, UK. [1895].

Trade union offices
Preceded by Thomas Ashton and W. C. Steadman	Auditor of the Trades Union Congress; 1894; With: Thomas Ashton	Succeeded by William Parrott and William Henry Wilkinson
