= John Wheatley =

Scottish socialist politician (1869–1930)

John Wheatley MP
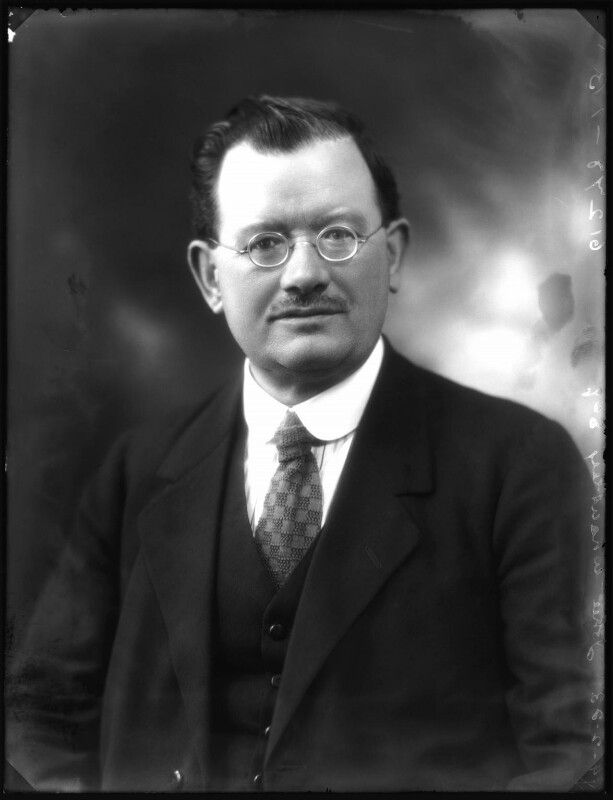

Minister of Health
- In office 22 January – 3 November 1924
- Monarch: George V
- Prime Minister: Ramsay MacDonald
- Preceded by: Sir William Joynson-Hicks
- Succeeded by: Neville Chamberlain

Member of Parliament for Glasgow Shettleston
- In office 16 November 1922 – 12 May 1930
- Preceded by: T. B. S. Adair
- Succeeded by: John McGovern

Personal details
- Born: 19 May 1869 Bonmahon, Ireland
- Died: 12 May 1930 (aged 60) Shettleston, Scotland
- Resting place: St Peter's Cemetery, Glasgow
- Spouse: Mary Meechan

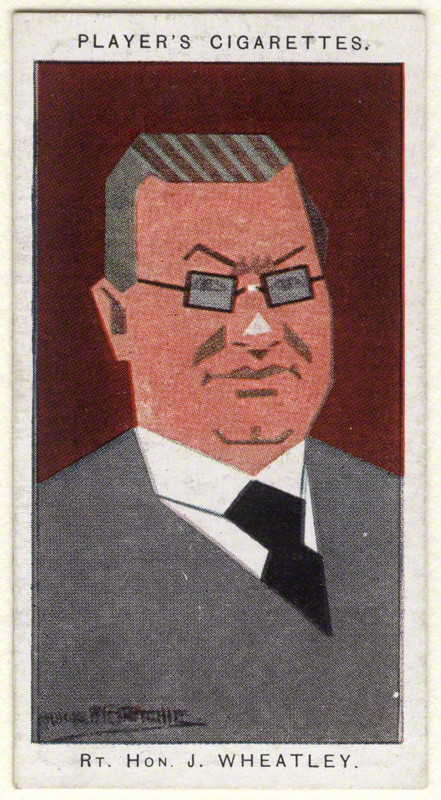
Cigarette card depicting Wheatley

John Wheatley (19 May 1869 – 12 May 1930) was a Scottish socialist politician. He was a prominent figure of the Red Clydeside era.

== Early life ==
Wheatley was born to Thomas and Johanna Wheatley in Bonmahon, County Waterford, Ireland. In 1876 the family moved to Bargeddie, near Baillieston, Lanarkshire in Scotland. His father found work as a miner in the local coalfield, however his family lived in grinding poverty, with him, his parents and his seven brothers and sisters living in a single room cottage without drainage or running water. Wheatley did well at school, but at the age of 11, he joined his father working as a miner, which he did for the next twelve years. After that he worked briefly as a shop assistant and then as a publican.

In 1896 he married Mary Meechan, a domestic servant. He then moved to Shettleston, on the eastern edge of Glasgow, where he ran a grocery business with his brother Patrick, until the business closed in 1901. He then found work collecting advertising copy for the Glasgow Observer.

Wheatley then started a successful printing business called Hoxton and Walsh in 1908, which published leftist political works. He wrote many of them, including How the Miners Were Robbed (1907), The Catholic Workingman (1909), Miners, Mines and Misery (1909), Eight Pound Cottages for Glasgow Citizens (1913), Municipal Banking (1920) and The New Rent Act (1920).

He was a deeply religious man and a practising Roman Catholic. Influenced by early Christian-socialist thinkers, in 1907 he joined the Independent Labour Party (ILP). He founded and was the first chairman of the Catholic Socialist Society.

== Political career ==
Wheatley was elected to a Shettleston seat on the Lanarkshire county council in 1910, and he held the seat for Labour in 1912 when Shettleston was incorporated into Glasgow. He became an active councillor, and advocated for council schemes to build municipal housing for working-class tenants at fair rents.

Against the UK's involvement in World War I, he campaigned against conscription, and supported the creation of a Glasgow branch of the Union of Democratic Control, which campaigned for a negotiated peace. He also assisted in organising rent strikes in Glasgow in 1915, which influenced the government sufficiently that they brought in rent restriction legislation.

He stood in the Glasgow Shettleston constituency in the 1918 General Election, but fell just 72 votes short of being elected to the House of Commons. Four years later in the 1922 General Election he succeeded in being elected, and he held the seat until his death in 1930. He was a great supporter of Celtic Football Club.

Labour leader Ramsay MacDonald sometimes disapproved of Wheatley's debating methods, as well as his friendship with James Maxton, who was suspended from the Commons on one occasion when he called Conservative MP Sir Frederick Banbury "a murderer" for a proposed cut in child welfare. However, Wheatley continued to work closely with his ILP colleagues in the Parliamentary Labour Party, especially Maxton.

Wheatley was known as the intellectual behind the ILP activities. Along with many ILP MPs, especially those from Clydeside, he found himself drifting from MacDonald's Labour leadership. Wheatley remained a widely respected political figure and when MacDonald became Prime Minister in January 1924, he appointed Wheatley as his Minister of Health. Wheatley is best remembered for his Housing (Financial Provisions) Act 1924 (better known as the Wheatley Housing Act) which saw a massive expansion in affordable municipal housing for the working class.

On 9 May 1924, H. G. Wells led a delegation to ask for birth control reforms. The delegation asked for two things: that institutions under Ministry of Health control should give contraceptive advice to those who asked for it; and that doctors at welfare centres should be allowed to offer advice in certain medical cases. Wheatley held strong views against birth control and refused to support the campaign.

Wheatley was a passionate advocate of the miners' cause during the 1926 general strike.

Wheatley criticised MacDonald for moving Labour to the right after 1924. Consequently, he did not hold a post in the Labour Government which formed after the 1929 general election. He refused to support many of the measures proposed by MacDonald's government. Along with James Maxton (now Wheatley's leader in the ILP) he became one of the Labour-left's leading critics.

== Death and legacy ==
John Wheatley died at his home from a brain haemorrhage on 12 May 1930, at age 60.

Wheatley Housing Group (Scotland's largest registered social landlord) and John Wheatley College (now Glasgow Kelvin College) in Glasgow are named after him. His nephew, John Thomas Wheatley, became a Labour MP for Edinburgh East in 1947 and Lord Advocate.

Parliament of the United Kingdom
| Preceded by Thomas Adair | Member of Parliament for Glasgow Shettleston; 1922–1930 | Succeeded by John McGovern |
Political offices
| Preceded by Sir William Joynson-Hicks | Minister of Health; 1924 | Succeeded by Neville Chamberlain |
