= Manchester North East (UK Parliament constituency) =

Parliamentary constituency in the United Kingdom, 1885–1918

- Former borough constituency for the House of Commons

1885–1918
- Seats: one
- Created from: Manchester
- Replaced by: Manchester Ardwick, Manchester Clayton

Manchester North East was one of several Parliamentary constituencies created in 1885 from the former Manchester constituency. It was abolished in 1918.

C. P. Scott, the editor and then part-owner of the Manchester Guardian stood unsuccessfully in 1886, 1891 and 1892. John Robert Clynes (1906–1918) later became leader of the Labour Party.

== Members of Parliament ==
Election	Member	Party
1885	Sir James Fergusson	Conservative
1906	J. R. Clynes	Labour
1918	constituency abolished	

== Election results ==
Decades:	1880s; 1890s; 1900s; 1910s

=== Elections in the 1880s ===
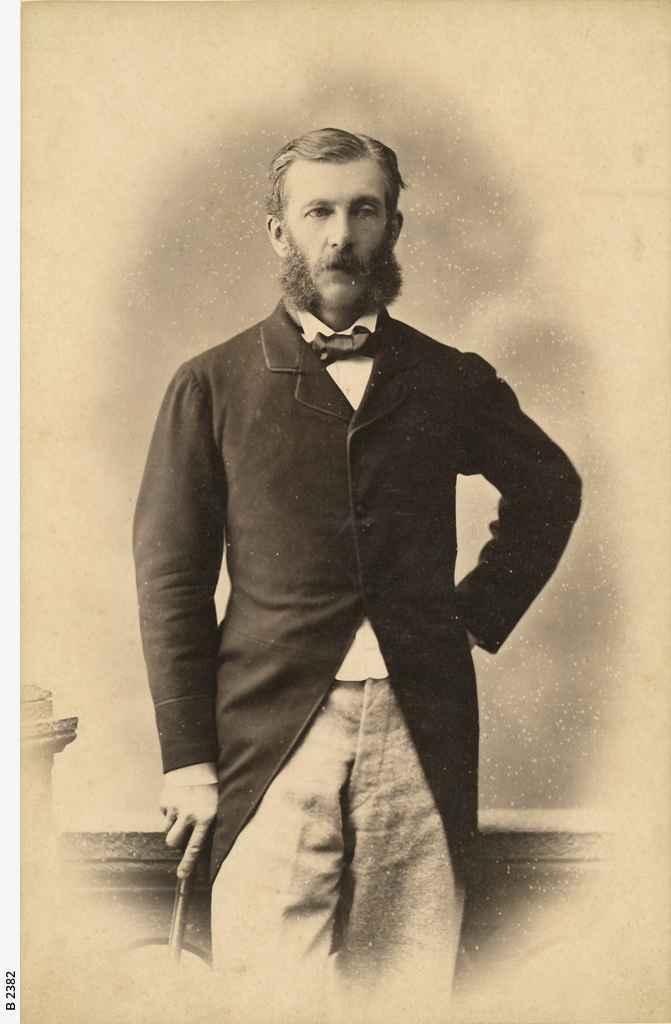
Fergusson

General election 1885: Manchester North East
Party	Candidate	Votes	%	±%
Conservative	James Fergusson	4,341	60.0	
Liberal	Rowland Ponsonby Blennerhassett	2,893	40.0	
Majority		1,448	20.0	
Turnout		7,234	84.3	
Registered electors		8,579		
Conservative win (new seat)				

Scott

General election 1886: Manchester North East
Party	Candidate	Votes	%	±%
Conservative	James Fergusson	3,680	52.3	−7.7
Liberal	C. P. Scott	3,353	47.7	+7.7
Majority		327	4.6	−15.4
Turnout		7,033	82.0	−2.3
Registered electors		8,579		
Conservative hold		Swing	-7.7	

=== Elections in the 1890s ===
1891 Manchester North East by-election
Party	Candidate	Votes	%	±%
Conservative	James Fergusson	4,058	50.9	−1.4
Liberal	C. P. Scott	3,908	49.1	+1.4
Majority		150	1.8	−2.8
Turnout		7,966	85.8	+3.8
Registered electors		9,288		
Conservative hold		Swing	−1.4	

- Caused by Fergusson's appointment as Postmaster General

General election 1892: Manchester North East
Party	Candidate	Votes	%	±%
Conservative	James Fergusson	4,239	50.7	−1.6
Liberal	C. P. Scott	4,129	49.3	+1.6
Majority		110	1.4	−3.2
Turnout		8,368	88.6	+6.6
Registered electors		9,449		
Conservative hold		Swing	−1.6	

General election 1895: Manchester North East
Party	Candidate	Votes	%	±%
Conservative	James Fergusson	3,961	48.2	−2.5
Liberal	Edwyn Holt	3,720	45.2	−4.1
Ind. Labour Party	James Johnston	546	6.6	New
Majority		241	3.0	+1.6
Turnout		8,227	83.2	−4.6
Registered electors		9,893		
Conservative hold		Swing	+0.8	

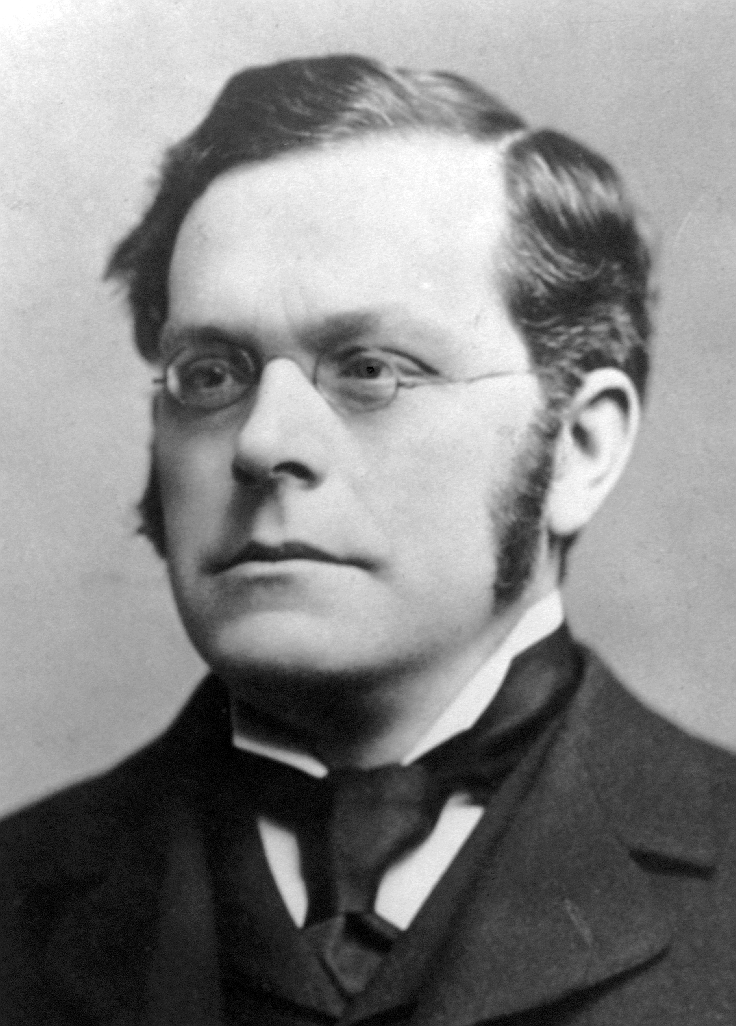
Birrell

=== Elections in the 1900s ===
General election 1900: Manchester North East
Party	Candidate	Votes	%	±%
Conservative	James Fergusson	4,316	54.5	+6.3
Liberal	Augustine Birrell	3,610	45.5	+0.3
Majority		706	9.0	+6.0
Turnout		7,926	79.7	−3.5
Registered electors		9,947		
Conservative hold		Swing	+3.0	

General election 1906: Manchester North East
Party	Candidate	Votes	%	±%
Labour Repr. Cmte.	J. R. Clynes	5,386	64.6	New
Conservative	James Fergusson	2,954	35.4	−19.1
Majority		2,432	29.2	N/A
Turnout		8,340	86.0	+6.3
Registered electors		9,701		
Labour Repr. Cmte. gain from Conservative		Swing		

=== Elections in the 1910s ===
General election January 1910: Manchester North East
Party	Candidate	Votes	%	±%
Labour	J. R. Clynes	5,157	58.4	−6.2
Conservative	William Vaudrey	3,679	41.6	+6.2
Majority		1,478	16.8	−12.4
Turnout		8,836	89.0	+3.0
Registered electors		9,925		
Labour hold		Swing	-6.2	

General election December 1910: Manchester North East
Party	Candidate	Votes	%	±%
Labour	J. R. Clynes	4,313	51.2	−7.2
Conservative	Arthur Taylor	4,108	48.8	+7.2
Majority		205	2.4	−14.4
Turnout		8,421	84.8	−4.2
Registered electors		9,925		
Labour hold		Swing	-7.2	

By-election, 1918: Manchester North East
Party	Candidate	Votes	%	±%
Labour	J. R. Clynes	Unopposed		
Labour hold				

== Sources ==
Election Results:

- https://web.archive.org/web/20060520143104/http://www.manchester.gov.uk/elections/archive/gen1900.htm
- https://web.archive.org/web/20060520143047/http://www.manchester.gov.uk/elections/archive/gen1945.htm

Vaudrey:

- http://www.spinningtheweb.org.uk/bookbrowse.php?page=47&book=F920.04273T1&size=292x400
