= Charles Adair (Royal Marines officer) =

Royal Marines officer

General Sir Charles Adair KCB
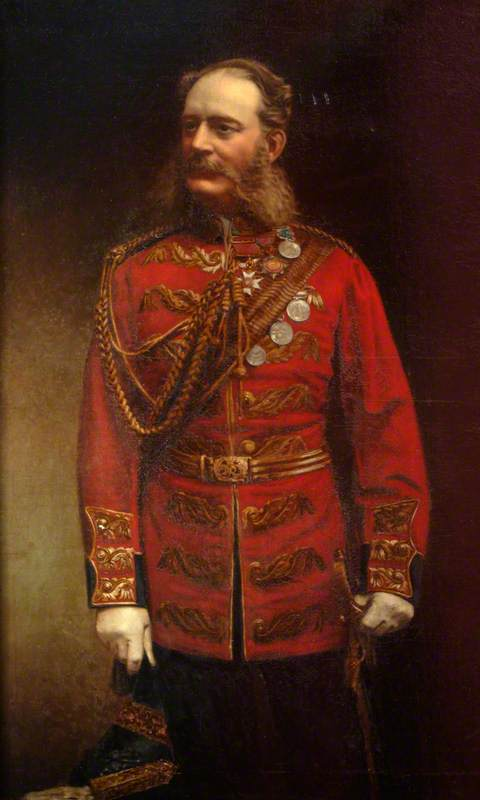
- Sir Charles Adair
- Born: 15 April 1822; Plymouth, Devon, England
- Died: 27 December 1897 (aged 75)
- Relatives: T. B. S. Adair (son)
- Military career
- Allegiance: United Kingdom
- Branch: Royal Marines
- Service years: c.1837–1883
- Rank: General
- Commands: Royal Marines
- Awards: Knight Commander of the Order of the Bath

General Sir Charles William Adair KCB (15 April 1822 – 27 December 1897) was a Royal Marines officer who served as Deputy Adjutant-General Royal Marines.

== Military career ==
Adair was born in Plymouth, the son of Major-General Thomas Benjamin Adair CB. He was appointed a lieutenant in the Royal Marines on 12 February 1842. He became colonel and second commandant at the Chatham Division on 16 February 1872, Assistant Adjutant-General at Headquarters Royal Marine Forces on 30 October 1872. and colonel-commandant of the Portsmouth Division on 29 July 1876. He went on to be Deputy Adjutant-General Royal Marines (the professional head of the Royal Marines) in September 1878 before retiring in September 1883.

He was appointed Aide-de-Camp to the Queen in 1870. In 1871, he was appointed a Companion of the Order of the Bath (CB) and knighted in the same order in 1882.

He married Isabella Aslett daughter of Col. Thompson Aslett. He was the father of Rear-Admiral Thomas Benjamin Stratton Adair.

Military offices
Preceded by George Rodney	Deputy Adjutant-General Royal Marines; 1878–1883	Succeeded by Sir John Williams
