= Glasgow Shettleston (UK Parliament constituency) =

Parliamentary constituency in the United Kingdom, 1918–2005

- Former burgh constituency for the House of Commons
- Subdivision: County of city of Glasgow; City of Glasgow district Glasgow City council area

1918–2005
- Seats: One
- Created from: North West Lanarkshire
- Replaced by: Glasgow Central; Glasgow East

Glasgow Shettleston was a burgh constituency represented in the House of Commons of the Parliament of the United Kingdom from 1918 until 2005. The Shettleston area's representation is now covered by Glasgow Central and Glasgow East.

== Boundaries ==
1918–1950: "That portion of the city which is bounded by a line commencing at a point on the municipal boundary about 299 yards north-westward from the centre of Carntyne Road, at a point where the municipal boundary intersects that road, thence eastward, south-eastward and westward along the municipal boundary to the centre of the Caledonian Railway Branch Line from Rutherglen to Dalmarnock, thence northward along the centre line of the said railway until it, joins the Caledonian Railway (Glasgow Lines), thence northward, north-eastward, northward and north-eastward along the centre line of the last-mentioned railway to a point 380 yards south of the centre line of Cumbernauld Road, thence south-eastward to the point of commencement."

1950–1955: The County of the City of Glasgow wards of Parkhead, Shettleston, and Tollcross, and part of Mile-End ward.

1955–1974: The County of the City of Glasgow wards of Parkhead, Shettleston, and Tollcross, and part of Mile End ward.

1974–1983: The County of the City of Glasgow wards of Mile-End, Parkhead, and part of the Shettleston and Tollcross ward.

1983–1997: The City of Glasgow District electoral divisions of Belvidere/Carntyne, Mount/Baillieston, and Parkhead/Shettleston.

1997–2005: The City of Glasgow District electoral divisions of Calton/Dalmarnock, Gorbals/Govanhill, and Shettleston/Tollcross.

== Members of Parliament ==
Election	Member	Party
1918	Thomas Benjamin Stratton Adair	Unionist
1922	John Wheatley	Labour
1930 by-election	John McGovern	Labour
1930	John McGovern	Independent Labour Party
1947	John McGovern	Labour
1959	Sir Myer Galpern	Labour
1979	David Marshall	Labour
2005	constituency abolished	

== Elections ==
=== Elections in the 1910s ===
General election 1918: Glasgow Shettleston
Party		Candidate	Votes	%	±%
C	Unionist	Thomas Benjamin Stratton Adair	9,901	50.2	
	Labour	John Wheatley	9,827	49.8	
Majority			74	0.4	
Turnout			19,728	62.7	
Registered electors			31,488		
	Unionist win (new seat)				
C indicates candidate endorsed by the coalition government.

=== Elections in the 1920s ===
1922 general election: Glasgow Shettleston
Party	Candidate	Votes	%	±%
Labour	John Wheatley	14,695	59.1	+9.3
National Liberal	Thomas Ramsay	9,704	39.0	New
Anti-Parliamentary Communist	Guy Aldred	470	1.9	New
Majority		4,991	20.1	N/A
Turnout		24,869	83.9	+21.2
Registered electors		29,639		
Labour gain from Unionist		Swing		

General election 1923: Glasgow Shettleston
Party	Candidate	Votes	%	±%
Labour	John Wheatley	12,624	59.8	+0.7
Liberal	Francis John Robertson	8,471	40.2	+1.2
Majority		4,153	19.6	−0.5
Turnout		21,095	71.0	−12.9
Registered electors		29,708		
Labour hold		Swing	−0.3	

General election 1924: Glasgow Shettleston
Party	Candidate	Votes	%	±%
Labour	John Wheatley	12,714	51.3	−8.5
Unionist	John Maurice Reid Miller	12,084	48.7	New
Majority		630	2.6	−17.0
Turnout		24,798	81.8	+10.8
Registered electors		30,324		
Labour hold		Swing		

General election 1929: Glasgow Shettleston
Party	Candidate	Votes	%	±%
Labour	John Wheatley	19,594	60.4	+9.1
Unionist	Herbert James Moss	12,870	39.6	−9.1
Majority		6,724	20.8	+18.2
Turnout		32,464	76.9	−4.9
Registered electors		42,193		
Labour hold		Swing	+9.1	

=== Elections in the 1930s ===
1930 Glasgow Shettleston by-election
Party	Candidate	Votes	%	±%
Labour	John McGovern	10,699	42.8	−17.6
Unionist	William Templeton	10,303	41.2	+1.6
National (Scotland)	John McNicol	2,527	10.1	New
Communist	Shapurji Saklatvala	1,459	5.8	New
Majority		396	1.6	−19.2
Turnout		24,988	36.5	−40.4
Labour hold		Swing		

General election 1931: Glasgow Shettleston
Party	Candidate	Votes	%	±%
Ind. Labour Party	John McGovern	16,301	47.8	N/A
Unionist	James Lucas	15,530	45.5	+5.9
Labour	J.Y Marshall	1,856	5.4	−55.0
New Party	W.E. Stevenson	402	1.2	New
Majority		771	2.3	N/A
Turnout		34,089		
Ind. Labour Party gain from Labour		Swing		

General election 1935: Glasgow Shettleston
Party	Candidate	Votes	%	±%
Ind. Labour Party	John McGovern	18,377	52.8	+5.0
Unionist	Ronald Russell	13,802	39.7	−5.8
Labour	George Beggs	2,610	7.5	+2.1
Majority		4,575	13.1	+10.8
Turnout		34,789	74.5	
Ind. Labour Party hold		Swing		

=== Elections in the 1940s ===
General election 1945: Glasgow Shettleston
Party	Candidate	Votes	%	±%
Ind. Labour Party	John McGovern	11,947	35.5	−17.3
Unionist	William Gordon Bennett	10,453	31.1	−8.6
Labour	John Stewart Dallas	6,910	20.6	+13.1
Communist	Peter Kerrigan	4,122	12.3	New
Independent	Isaac Queen	186	0.6	New
Majority		1,494	4.4	−8.7
Turnout		33,618	66.7	−7.8
Ind. Labour Party hold		Swing		

=== Elections in the 1950s ===
General election 1950: Glasgow Shettleston
Party	Candidate	Votes	%	±%
Labour	John McGovern	23,467	56.7	+36.1
Unionist	T. C. Henderson	15,226	36.8	+5.7
Communist	Malcolm MacEwen	1,678	4.1	−8.2
Ind. Labour Party	James W. Graham	1,031	2.5	−33.0
Majority		8,241	19.9	+15.5
Turnout		41,402	79.9	+13.2
Labour gain from Ind. Labour Party		Swing		

General election 1951: Glasgow Shettleston
Party	Candidate	Votes	%	±%
Labour	John McGovern	25,359	59.8	+3.1
Unionist	John Oswald Mair Hunter	15,876	37.4	+0.6
Ind. Labour Party	James W. Graham	1,195	2.8	+0.3
Majority		9,483	22.4	+2.5
Turnout		42,430	81.2	+1.3
Labour hold		Swing		

General election 1955: Glasgow Shettleston
Party	Candidate	Votes	%	±%
Labour	John McGovern	21,464	57.8	−2.0
Unionist	John Oswald Mair Hunter	15,645	42.2	+4.8
Majority		5,819	15.6	−6.8
Turnout		37,109	69.3	−11.9
Labour hold		Swing		

General election 1959: Glasgow Shettleston
Party	Candidate	Votes	%	±%
Labour	Myer Galpern	22,916	60.9	+3.1
Unionist	D. E. Donaldson	14,743	39.1	−3.1
Majority		8,173	21.8	+6.2
Turnout		37,659	75.3	+6.0
Labour hold		Swing		

=== Elections in the 1960s ===
General election 1964: Glasgow Shettleston
Party	Candidate	Votes	%	±%
Labour	Myer Galpern	22,494	68.0	+7.1
Unionist	George Weir	10,598	32.0	−7.1
Majority		11,896	36.0	+14.2
Turnout		33,092	71.4	−3.9
Labour hold		Swing		

General election 1966: Glasgow Shettleston
Party	Candidate	Votes	%	±%
Labour	Myer Galpern	20,208	65.6	−2.4
Conservative	William James Rennie	6,857	22.3	−9.7
SNP	William Lindsay	3,732	12.1	New
Majority		13,351	43.3	+7.3
Turnout		30,797	68.6	−2.8
Labour hold		Swing		

=== Elections in the 1970s ===
General election 1970: Glasgow Shettleston
Party	Candidate	Votes	%	±%
Labour	Myer Galpern	17,840	59.9	−5.7
Conservative	Albert McCue	7,969	26.7	+4.4
SNP	William Lindsay	3,995	13.4	+1.3
Majority		9,871	33.2	−10.1
Turnout		29,804	63.6	−5.0
Labour hold		Swing		

General election February 1974: Glasgow Shettleston
Party	Candidate	Votes	%	±%
Labour	Myer Galpern	14,208	53.6	−6.3
Conservative	Leonard Turpie	6,472	24.4	−2.3
SNP	William Lindsay	5,834	22.0	+8.6
Majority		7,736	29.2	−4.0
Turnout		26,514	69.5	+5.9
Labour hold		Swing		

General election October 1974: Glasgow Shettleston
Party	Candidate	Votes	%	±%
Labour	Myer Galpern	13,391	54.3	+0.7
SNP	R. Hamilton	7,042	28.6	+6.6
Conservative	James Cran	3,543	14.4	−10.0
Liberal	Richard John Brodie	690	2.8	New
Majority		6,349	25.7	−3.5
Turnout		24,666	64.4	−5.1
Labour hold		Swing		

General election 1979: Glasgow Shettleston
Party	Candidate	Votes	%	±%
Labour	David Marshall	13,955	64.1	+9.8
Conservative	M. McClure	4,794	22.0	+7.6
SNP	Margo MacDonald	3,022	13.9	−14.7
Majority		9,161	42.1	+16.4
Turnout		21,771	68.2	+3.8
Labour hold		Swing		

=== Elections in the 1980s ===
General election 1983: Glasgow Shettleston
Party	Candidate	Votes	%	±%
Labour	David Marshall	19,203	54.2	−9.9
Conservative	Iain Henderson	6,787	19.1	−2.9
Liberal	Simon Strachen	6,568	18.5	New
SNP	Daniel Hood	2,801	7.9	−6.0
BNP	K. Hill	103	0.3	New
Majority		12,416	35.1	−7.0
Turnout		35,462	68.3	+0.1
Labour hold		Swing		

General election 1987: Glasgow Shettleston
Party	Candidate	Votes	%	±%
Labour	David Marshall	23,991	63.6	+9.4
Conservative	Mark Fisher	5,010	13.3	−5.8
SNP	John Armstrong McVicar	4,807	12.7	+4.8
Liberal	Pauline Agnes Margaret Clarke	3,942	10.4	−8.1
Majority		18,981	50.3	+15.2
Turnout		37,750	70.4	+2.1
Labour hold		Swing		

=== Elections in the 1990s ===
General election 1992: Glasgow Shettleston
Party	Candidate	Votes	%	±%
Labour	David Marshall	21,665	60.6	−3.0
SNP	Nicola Sturgeon	6,831	19.1	+6.4
Conservative	Norman Mortimer	5,396	15.1	+1.8
Liberal Democrats	Joan Orskov	1,881	5.3	−5.1
Majority		14,834	41.5	−8.8
Turnout		35,773	68.9	−1.5
Labour hold		Swing		

General election 1997: Glasgow Shettleston
Party	Candidate	Votes	%	±%
Labour	David Marshall	19,616	73.2	+12.6
SNP	Humayun Hanif	3,748	14.0	−5.1
Conservative	Colin Simpson	1,484	5.5	−9.6
Liberal Democrats	Kerry Hiles	1,061	4.0	−1.3
Scottish Socialist	Christine McVicar	482	1.8	New
BNP	Robert Currie	191	0.7	New
Referendum	Thomas Montguire	151	0.6	New
Workers Revolutionary	John Graham	80	0.3	New
Majority		15,868	59.2	+17.7
Turnout		26,813	55.7	−13.2
Labour hold		Swing		

=== Elections in the 2000s ===
General election 2001: Glasgow Shettleston
Party	Candidate	Votes	%	±%
Labour	David Marshall	13,235	64.7	−8.5
SNP	Jim Byrne	3,417	16.7	+2.7
Scottish Socialist	Rosie Kane	1,396	6.8	+5.0
Liberal Democrats	Lewis Hutton	1,105	5.4	+1.4
Conservative	Campbell Murdoch	1,082	5.3	−0.2
Socialist Labour	Murdo Ritchie	230	1.1	New
Majority		9,818	48.0	−11.2
Turnout		20,465	39.7	−16.0
Labour hold		Swing		

== See also ==
- Glasgow Shettleston (Scottish Parliament constituency)
