= John L. Kinloch =

Scottish politician

John Laing Kinloch (12 February 1880 – 1968) was a Scottish nationalist politician.

== Career ==
Kinloch attended the University of Glasgow, graduating with an MA in 1901. He joined the Liberal Party, initially due to his sympathy for the Boers in the Second Boer War, and was highly active in the Young Scots Society.

He became known as a leading member of the Scottish Single Tax League, and unsuccessfully fought a legal case over land in Balloch.

In 1911, Kinloch became the election agent for Josiah Wedgwood, Liberal Party MP for Newcastle-under-Lyme, and immediately began setting up permanent organisation committees in each ward in Wedgwood's constituency. He built links with the local Labour Party, which encouraged its members to attend meeting where Wedgwood spoke on progressive issues, thereby reducing the influence of the right of the Liberal Party, who were hostile to Wedgwood. He became increasingly interested in the labour movement, and in 1914 joined the Independent Labour Party, principally due to its anti-war stance. Wedgwood, for the time being, remained with the Liberals, so Kinloch returned to Scotland, and became a schoolteacher.

Within the ILP, Kinloch became known for his continued advocacy of the socialisation of land. He also advocated hydroelectric projects, hoping these would bring work and people to the Scottish Highlands, and argued for the construction of a new city and port at Loch Eriboll. He stood for the Labour Party in Glasgow Hillhead at the 1923 and 1924 United Kingdom general elections, taking second place on each occasion.

Kinloch was next selected as the Prospective Parliamentary Candidate for Argyll. In support of this, in 1927 he went on a speaking tour of Mull, on which he was accompanied by John MacCormick. The two found that Scottish Home Rule was a more popular topic than socialism, Kinloch believing that the Labour Party was best placed to deliver it.

Kinloch was defeated in Argyll at the 1929 United Kingdom general election, and soon after left the ILP, joining instead the small National Party of Scotland (NPS), within which he became a prominent figure, winning election to the Cove and Kilcreggan Town Council. In 1934, the NPS became part of the new Scottish National Party, and Kinloch became editor of its associated newspaper, the Scots Independent. He stood for the party in Greenock at the 1935 United Kingdom general election, but took only a distant third place, with 3.3% of the vote. He founded the Clan Scotland youth movement, designed to emulate the Gaelic Athletic Association, but it did not thrive.

Kinloch lived until 1968, and claimed to have worn the kilt every day of his life.
