= 1918 Manchester North East by-election =

UK parliamentary by-election

The 1918 Manchester North East by-election was a parliamentary by-election held for the British House of Commons constituency of Manchester North East on 16 July 1918.

== Vacancy ==
The by-election was caused by the appointment of the sitting Labour MP, J. R. Clynes as Minister of Food Control in the wartime coalition government of David Lloyd George, following the death of Lord Rhondda. Under the regulations of the day, Clynes was obliged to resign his seat and fight a by-election.

== Candidates ==
Clynes was re-selected by the Manchester Labour Party to contest the by-election and there being no other candidates putting themselves forward was returned unopposed.

== Result ==
Manchester North East by-election, 1915
Party	Candidate	Votes	%	±%
Labour	J. R. Clynes	Unopposed	N/A	N/A
Labour hold				

== See also ==
- List of United Kingdom by-elections
- United Kingdom by-election records
