= John Primrose Hay =

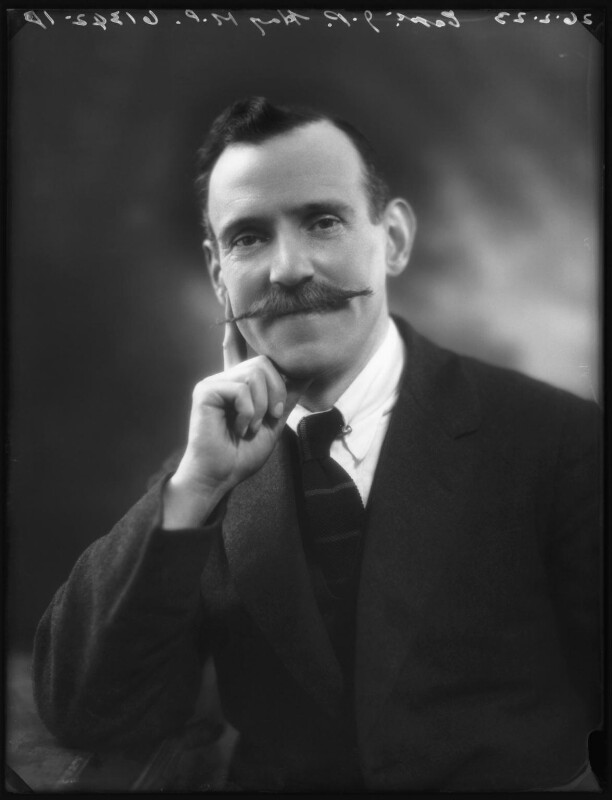
Hay in 1923

Captain John Primrose Hay (4 April 1878 – 5 December 1949) was a Labour MP for Glasgow Cathcart.

Hay was born in Coatbridge and educated at the Glasgow Free Church Training College and the University of Glasgow. He became a lecturer in mathematics at Manchuria Christian College from 1906 to 1915, after which he joined the Royal Garrison Artillery. He served in France for the remainder of World War I, becoming a captain. He was awarded the Chinese Order of Wen-Hu.

Hay was a supporter of the Labour Party, for which he stood in Glasgow Cathcart at the 1922 general election, winning the seat. However, he lost in 1923, and was defeated again in 1924 and 1929.

Parliament of the United Kingdom
Preceded by John Pratt	Member of Parliament for Glasgow Cathcart; 1922 – 1923	Succeeded by Robert MacDonald
