= 1930 Glasgow Shettleston by-election =

UK parliamentary by-election

The 1930 Glasgow Shettleston by-election was held on 26 June 1930. The by-election was held due to the death of the incumbent Labour MP, John Wheatley. It was won by the Labour candidate John McGovern. Allegations that McGovern had rigged the Labour party candidate selection for the by-election were to lead to his expulsion from the Labour Party, although he would retain the seat as an Independent Labour Party MP.

Glasgow Shettleston by-election, 1930
Party	Candidate	Votes	%	±%
Labour	John McGovern	10,699	42.8	−17.6
Unionist	William Templeton	10,303	41.2	+1.6
National (Scotland)	John McNicol	2,527	10.1	New
Communist	Shapurji Saklatvala	1,459	5.8	New
Majority		396	1.6	−19.2
Turnout		24,988	36.5	−40.4
Labour hold		Swing		
