= John Train (politician) =

Scottish politician (1873–1942)

Sir John Train JP DL (8 May 1873 – 18 March 1942) was a Scottish politician who was a Unionist Party MP for Glasgow Cathcart. He was first elected in 1929, and held the seat until his death in 1942. He was knighted in the 1936 New Year Honours for political services.

== Professional and personal life ==
Train was born in Cambusnethan, Lanarkshire. He was a master builder by profession, following in his father's footsteps, establishing a business at the turn of the 20th century in Rutherglen – also living in the area for most of his life – along with his brother-in-law William Taylor (originally from County Down). Their John Train & Taylor company was involved in construction projects in Glasgow including the Alhambra Theatre, a prominent office block at Bell Street/High Street, the reconstruction of the McLellan Galleries, the Meadowside Granary and Dalmarnock Power Station (located directly on the River Clyde, a matter of a few hundred yards from their offices), as well as the Argyll Motor Works in Alexandria, West Dunbartonshire.

In 1923 the partnership ended, with Train continuing as John Train & Co., Ltd (with his sons James and John later joining the business); their contracts included work on the Kelvin Hall, the India Tyre Works, Jordanhill School, the conversion of Lennox Castle to a hospital and additions to the Templeton's Carpet Factory. Investments were made in stone quarrying on the nearby hills and housebuilding, including a development of bungalows and quartered villas on land the family owned near their home in Burnside.

Some of this land was donated for the construction of the Burnside lawn bowls club (established 1909) – local greens still compete for the 'John Train Cup' – and the adjacent parish church (although the main building for this, relocated from its original site in Pollokshields, was not completed until after his death. The family changed their residence from 'Evadale' in Burnside to the late-18th century Cathkin House mansion on the Cathkin Braes south of Rutherglen around 1918, and it remained with them until gifted to be converted into Scotland's first National Children's Home in 1955.

== Political career ==
Train was initially active in local politics as a member then chair of Rutherglen Town Council and was vice-convener of Lanarkshire County Council from 1923 to 1930. He stood unsuccessfully as a National Liberal Party candidate for the Rutherglen parliamentary constituency in the 1922 general election, before switching to the Unionist Party and retaining their seat in the Glasgow Cathcart constituency in the 1929 election with a majority of 6.8%. This increased to a huge 49.1% in 1931, and was comfortably held again (24.3% majority) in 1935, with Train remaining in office until his death at his home in 1942, aged 58.

Train was a deputy lieutenant for the county of the city, and served as Deacon of the Incorporation of Masons of Glasgow and the overall Deacon Convenor of the city's trade guilds (the latter roles were also held by his son John Wark Train MBE).

Parliament of the United Kingdom
Preceded by Robert MacDonald	Member of Parliament for Glasgow Cathcart; 1929 – 1942	Succeeded by Francis Beattie
