= 1942 Glasgow Cathcart by-election =

UK parliamentary by-election

The 1942 Glasgow Cathcart by-election was held on 29 April 1942. The by-election was held due to the death of the incumbent Conservative MP, John Train. It was won by the Conservative candidate Francis Beattie.

By-election 1942: Glasgow Cathcart
Party	Candidate	Votes	%	±%
Unionist	Francis Beattie	10,786	59.6	−2.5
Independent Progressive	William Douglas Home	3,807	21.0	New
Ind. Labour Party	James Carmichael	2,493	13.8	N/A
Independent Scottish Nationalist	William Whyte	1,000	5.5	New
Majority		6,979	38.6	+14.4
Turnout		18,086		
Unionist hold		Swing		
