= William Sloan Cormack =

British college leader and political activist

William Sloan Cormack (24 November 1898 – 30 November 1973) was a British college leader and political activist.

Born in the Maryhill area of Glasgow, Cormack left school when he was fourteen years old and completed an apprenticeship as an engineer. In his spare time, he studied at night school, and thereby was able to enter the Royal Technical College, and finally the University of Glasgow, receiving a degree in mechanical engineering in 1921.

Cormack was a pacifist, following his parents, and joined the Glasgow Study Circle which they had set up. He opposed World War I, and in 1918 served time at Wormwood Scrubs as a conscientious objector, but agreed to undertake work at Dartmoor Prison, and was released in 1919, joining the Independent Labour Party.

After completing his degree and apprenticeship, Cormack worked as an engineering draughtsman, then trained as a teacher at Jordanhill College. He found work at Newport Technical College, then as a schoolteacher. He also stood for the Labour Party in Aberdeen and Kincardine East at the 1924 United Kingdom general election, and in Glasgow Hillhead at the 1929 United Kingdom general election, but was easily defeated on both occasions.

In 1930, Cormack received a doctorate from the University of Glasgow, his thesis entitled "An Economic History of Shipbuilding and Engineering, with special reference to the West of Scotland". He worked for the Workers' Educational Association for the next few years, then in 1935 became the principal of the new Stow College of Engineering. He held the post until 1964, by which time the college had grown to 9,000 students. He was also active in the Educational Institute of Scotland (EIS), and in 1945 was made a Fellow of the EIS.

Cormack retired to Edinburgh in 1964, joining the Fabian Society and campaigning against the Common Market. He died suddenly in 1973.
