= John Badlay =

British politician (1861–1944)

John Badlay (1861 – 14 April 1944) was a British politician.

== Early life ==
Born in Kirmond le Mire in Lincolnshire, Badlay worked full-time on a farm starting at age eight. He taught himself to read, and soon moved to Leeds, where he initially sold hay, before finding work in insurance. He then worked for a bookshop in Huddersfield, before setting up his own bookshop in Leeds. In 1885 he married Ann Elizabeth Atkinson, and they had a son and a daughter.

Badlay joined the Independent Labour Party (ILP) in 1895, and soon became president of its Leeds branch. He stood for Leeds City Council in the West ward in 1896, taking only 7.5% of the vote. His next candidacy was in 1905 in East Hunslet, when he was elected as a Labour Representation Committee candidate.

== Leadership of the Labour group ==
Badlay held his council seat for the Labour Party in 1908. At this time, the Labour group was led by John Buckle, who resented the influence of the ILP. In 1908, Buckle resigned in protest at the group refusing to meet with the King and Queen when they visited the city. Badlay was elected as his replacement, and oversaw Buckle's expulsion from the party. His time leading the group was, in retrospect, considered a success. While his personal style has been criticised by Michael Meadowcroft as "somewhat theatrical", he has also been praised for maintaining his radicalism and, on one occasion, speaking non-stop for three hours in opposition to a Conservative Party proposal. At times, he made controversial statements, and in 1912 he was successfully sued for libel by the Liberal Joseph Henry.

At the December 1910 United Kingdom general election, Badlay stood in Leeds South, Buckle had been readmitted to the party but still held a grudge against Badlay. He challenged Badlay's eligibility to stand for the party, claiming that Badlay had not maintained membership of a trade union, but this was rejected. However, the campaign was short of finance and poorly organised, and he took third place with 21.5% of the vote. That year, he also became an alderman on the council.

In 1912, Badlay was appointed as full-time organiser for a trade union, and then from 1913 became a director of the Royal Liver Friendly Society. This was considered incompatible with remaining a Labour councillor, and he was forced to resign as Labour leader in August, standing down as an alderman in November. His successors as Labour leader, George Pearson and then John Arnott, focused on making Labour appear administratively competent, but were criticised in the party's own newspaper, which stated that "...since John Badlay left, [the Conservatives] have had the happiest time making fools of the Labour Party in all manners possible".

== Later life ==
Badlay relocated to Liverpool, where he found the local ILP more amenable to his directorship, and he served on Liverpool City Council from 1919 to 1922. He also acted as treasurer of the Association of Collecting Friendly Societies. At the 1922 United Kingdom general election, he stood in Leeds North East, taking another third place, this time with 24.4% of the vote. He retired in 1931, and returned to Leeds, where he was re-elected to the council, becoming an alderman again in 1933. In 1937 he was elected as Lord Mayor of Leeds.

In 1940, a Communist Party of Great Britain (CPGB) event in opposition to World War II was organised at Leeds Town Hall. Badlay argued against the ban and, in response, he was expelled from the Labour Party. He remained on the council as an independent, although Graham Stevenson argues that he probably joined the CPGB.

On 14 April 1944, John Badlay died in Leeds. He was 83.

Civic offices
| Preceded by Tom Coombs | Lord Mayor of Leeds; 1937 | Succeeded by Rowland Winn |
