= Alexander Burns Mackay =

Scottish politician and trade unionist

Alexander Burns Mackay (1882–1973) was a Scottish politician and trade unionist.

Born in Douglas, Lanarkshire, Mackay was educated at Lanark Grammar School before becoming a bank clerk, working in Glasgow. In 1908, Mackay joined the Young Scots Society and the Liberal Party, with a particular interest in Georgism. He soon joined the Scottish Bankers' Association, serving as its president from 1920, and from 1921 also serving as the president of the Scottish Advisory Board of Professional Unions.

Mackay joined the Union of Democratic Control, serving as vice-president of its Scottish section, and around 1920 moved from the Liberals to the Independent Labour Party (ILP). The ILP sponsored him as a Labour Party candidate in Glasgow Pollok at the 1922 general election, in which he took second place.

Mackay retired in 1939, and won election to Glasgow City Council, representing Gorbals. He also became a magistrate, later serving as bailie. He stood for Parliament again in Glasgow Pollok at the 1945 general election, and in the 1946 Glasgow Cathcart by-election, but was not elected. He stood down from the council in 1951, but remained politically active.
