= Leyton Richards =

English Congregational minister and pacifist

Leyton Price Richards (12 March 1879 – 22 August 1948) was an English Congregational minister and prominent pacifist.

== Early life ==
Born in Ecclesall, Sheffield, in March 1879, Richards was a younger son of Charles Richards, a master clothier who in 1881 was employing 23 men there. After leaving school, he was educated at the University of Glasgow, where he graduated MA in 1903. He then trained as a Congregational minister.

== Career ==
Richards ministered for some years in Aberdeenshire, then about 1911 migrated briefly to Melbourne, Australia, where he had concerns about the workings of the Australian Defence Act 1910.

Returning to England, he was minister at Bowdon, Greater Manchester, until 1916, when he resigned after protesting against the Military Service Act 1916 and being fined £100. He was next appointed as Warden of the Quaker College at Woodbrooke.

From 1924, Richards was minister of the Carr’s Lane Congregational Church in Birmingham. He retired in 1939 on the grounds of poor health.

== No-Conscription Fellowship ==
The No-Conscription Fellowship was a pacifist organization founded in London on 27 November 1914 by Fenner Brockway and Clifford Allen, after the First World War had failed to reach an early conclusion. It campaigned against the Military Service Act 1916 which introduced conscription.

Richards became a member of the Fellowship and joined its National Committee, with Clifford Allen, Fenner Brockway, Alfred Salter, Aylmer Rose, Bertrand Russell, C. H. Norman, Catherine Marshall, Edward Grubb, John P. Fletcher, Morgan Jones, Will Chamberlain, and A. Barratt Brown.

The National Committee in 1916. front row (L to R): C. H. Norman, Alfred Salter, Aylmer Rose, Fenner Brockway, Clifford Allen, Edward Grubb, Will Chamberlain, Catherine Marshall: back row (L to R): Leyton Richards, Morgan Jones, John P. Fletcher, Alfred Barratt Brown and Bertrand Russell.

== Later work ==
In 1925, Richards made a tour lasting three months of the United States, in the interests of better international understanding, speaking from many well-known pulpits on Sundays, and during the week speaking about world peace to various schools and societies throughout the US. In March he spoke at the Phillips Brooks House in Harvard Yard on behalf of the Fellowship of Youth for Peace, a recently founded nationwide body.

He went on to write several books on Christian pacifism.

== Personal life ==
In 1907, at Whitby, Richards married Edith Ryley Pearson. Their daughter Margaret Richards (1910—1996) was born in Peterhead, Aberdeenshire. In January 1912, a second daughter Dorothy Joyce Richards was born while Richards and his family were living in Hawthorn, Victoria. A third daughter Carola Richards was born in 1916 in Salford, Manchester.

Richards died at his house in Mortimer Common, near Reading, on 22 August 1948. He left an estate valued at £8,755, and a widow, Edith Ryley Richards. She moved to Betchworth, Surrey, where she died in 1963.

== Selected publications ==
- The Christian's Contribution to Peace (1935)
- The Christian's Alternative to War (1935)
- Realistic Pacifism: the Ethics of War and the Politics of Peace (Chicago and New York: Willett, Clark & Co., 1935)
- Conscription and Christian Obligations (1947)
- Christian pacifism after two world wars (1948)
- Kirisutokyō hisen heiwa shugi (Tokyo: Shinkyō Shuppansha, 1952) (in Japanese)
