= James Scott Duckers =

British solicitor and pacifist

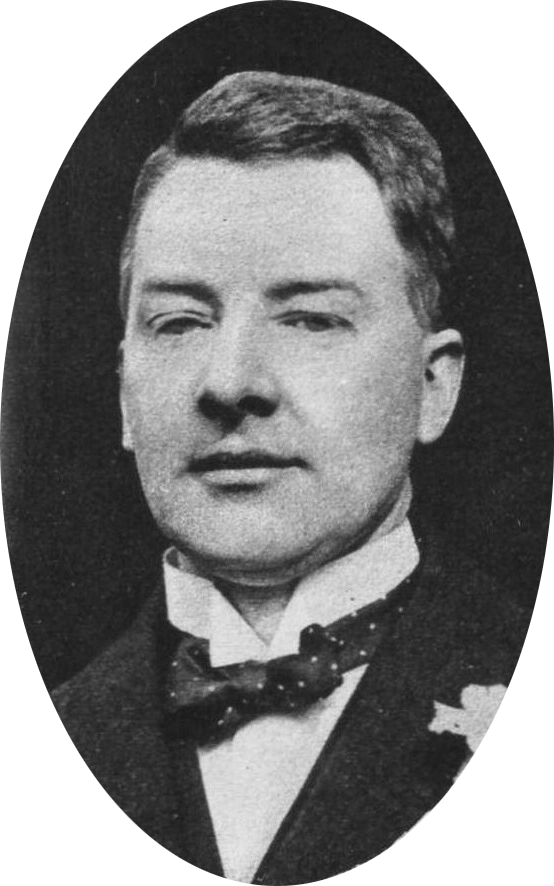
J. Scott Duckers in 1924

James Scott Duckers (1883 – 2 May 1941) also known as J. Scott Duckers, or simply Scott Duckers, was an English lawyer, and prominent pacifist organiser and conscientious objector of World War I. He is now best known for his wartime memoir Handed Over.

== Early life ==
Duckers was brought up in Wetheral, Cumberland; his sister Margaret Ellison Duckers was a nurse who died at Salonika in 1917. He was the son of James S. Duckers of Wetheral, and was born in Bristol; he was educated at Carlisle Grammar School. He was articled to Wannup & Westmorland, solicitors in Carlisle, where he was clerk to Edmund Westmorland.

Duckers qualified as a solicitor in 1905. In 1907 he was in the legal department of the Birmingham Small Arms Company. In 1910 he worked as a secretary to Herbert Samuel. He was known as a Wesleyan Methodist; and he gave pro bono legal advice, as a volunteer with the mission and social work of the Baptist ministers F. B. Meyer and Thomas Phillips (1868–1936).

London addresses for Duckers in 1911 were 27 Chancery Lane and 12 Rosslyn Hill. In February 1913, he was selected as the Radical candidate for Brentford, for the Westminster elections. In the 1913 London County Council election in March he was a candidate for the Progressive Party, in Paddington North. He was a supporter of Home Rule for Ireland, and member of the Eighty Club, and was invited in the same month to stand as the Liberal Party candidate for Brentford. In the end nothing came of this.

== World War I ==
Duckers in his wartime memoirs recalled that in late July and early August 1914 the National Liberal Club, where he resided, became "a sort of whirlpool of jingoism".

=== Stop the War Committee ===
Duckers founded in 1914/5 the Stop the War Committee (SWC) with C. H. (Clarence Henry) Norman. It opened a "Peace Committee" office at 27 Chancery Lane in early April 1915. Posters saying "Peace Committee" were displayed in a window.

Norman (born c.1890) was a dissident member of the No-Conscription Fellowship (NCF); he was an Independent Labour Party (ILP) member and Marxist revolutionary, and later fell out with Bertrand Russell. At this point Duckers himself belonged to the ILP, and the Union of Democratic Control, as well as being a leading figure in the NCF, and was the target of police attention.

A question was asked about the SWC's pamphleteering in parliament by Ronald McNeill, on 30 June 1915, mentioning also Ethel Bellis. In fact it has been considered that the SWC had only a minimal impact. It was a small fish among the pacifist organisations, overlapping the larger NCF in membership, with a mission statement to "demand that Britain's part in the war shall be brought to an immediate, honourable and righteous end."

In December 1915 Duckers represented Norman and the SWC in a case arising from a police raid on an ILP office in Salford. Holford Knight represented the ILP, and Harold Morris representing Clifford Allen. The Labour Leader published on 2 March 2016 his article "A Courageous Woman: A Sentence of Six Months" on the imprisonment of Nellie Best, secretary of the Women's Anti-Conscription League.

=== Absolutist conscientious objector ===
The Military Service Act 1916 introduced conscription in Great Britain at the beginning of that year. Duckers was sent a notice under the Act, which he ignored, and he was brought to Marlborough Street Magistrates Court on 11 April 1916 by a police constable, where he was charged with failing to report himself under the Act. He said "I do not admit I am under the Act," and refused to answer questions. Fined for the offence, he was deemed to be in the Army, and was sent to the Winchester barracks of the Rifle Brigade. He refused to wear military uniform.

The NCF eventually adopted the "absolutist" position as the correct response to conscription. Rather than accepting "alternative service", provided it did not support the war effort, absolutists resisted such direction. Such an attitude typically meant an extended prison sentence.

Duckers was then imprisoned by court martial. He was sentenced to 98 days in detention. The sentence was served in Wandsworth Detention Barracks, a section of Wandsworth Prison. He was released on 12 August, and taken by escort to Sheerness. He went on to the Rifle Brigade camp at Minster, where he refused to obey orders. While Duckers was in detention, C. H. Norman was also in Wandsworth Detention Barracks, and his treatment was raised in a parliamentary question by J. Howard Whitehouse.

On 21 August 1916, Thomas Richardson asked of the War Office minister Henry Forster in parliament," whether Mr. Scott Duckers, who has served his term of imprisonment [...] has since been sent back to the Army, and is now stationed at Sheerness; and whether it is the intention of the Government to keep up this system of persecution by forcing men to go through the same process time after time?" Forster did not accept the term "persecution", applied to an "insubordinate soldier"; and explained that on 8 August Duckers had appeared before the Central Tribunal, and would have nothing to do with it. He would be dealt with under the Army Act.

Sentenced again, Duckers received one year with hard labour, which was then commuted to 112 days. A third sentence was two years' hard labour, in Maidstone Prison. He was one of a group of noted "absolutist", non-cooperating conscientious objectors there, with Clifford Allen, Fenner Brockway and Herbert Runham Brown. Whitehouse asked a parliamentary question about his health on 1 July 1918. William Hewins answered that "the medical officer reports that the prisoner is in good health, bodily and mental."

In September 1918 the government used Wakefield Prison to bring together long-serving absolutist objectors. Duckers was on the committee of objectors there who produced a manifesto justifying their resistance.

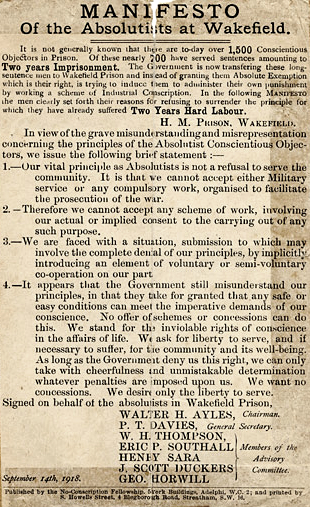
Wakefield Manifesto, September 1918, signed by J. Scott Duckers with Harry Thompson, Walter Ayles, Henry Sara and others

In January 1919 the governor of Maidstone Prison told the Home Office that Duckers was close to a physical breakdown. He was released later that year.

== Post-war ==
=== Scott Duckers & Thompson ===
Duckers went into partnership with Harry Thompson, another conscientious objector who had been imprisoned at Wakefield. The partnership began on 1 September 1919; its formation of the partnership was announced later in the month, with Thompson described as previously at Stoke-on-Trent. The bulk of its work was conveyancing.

Scott Duckers & Thompson defended James Winstone in a September 1919 libel action brought by Sir Eric Geddes. In 1920 Duckers was retained to defend John Frederick Hedley of the Socialist Labour Party, charged under the Defence of the Realm Act 1914. Also that year, he was solicitor to the National Labour Press.

The firm defended a libel action in April 1921, brought in the wake of the Black Friday crisis by J. H. Thomas against the printers of The Communist, the National Labour Press, and its editor, Francis Meynell. Duckers in May 1921 appeared on behalf of Albert Rose, manager of the National Labour Press, in a case concerning literature related to the 3rd World Congress of the Comintern, printed for Albert Inkpin of the Communist Party of Great Britain (CPGB).

Duckers and Thompson differed on party politics, however and went their own ways, a notice appearing that the partnership was dissolved from 31 August 1921. He gave his views on trade unions at a Law Society conference in 1920. Thompson was then a Guild Socialist.

The dissolution of the partnership in 1921 left Duckers with the office at 2 New Court, Carey Street, off Chancery Lane; and the debts. Thompson settled the financial account in 1924.

=== "Fetters and Roses" Dinner ===
A dinner was held in the House of Commons on 9 January 1924 for those who had been imprisoned "for political or religious reasons"; it was chaired by Duckers. According to Gleanings and Memoranda, published by the National Unionist Association, the dinner was given by Duckers, for the Members of Parliament elected at the 1923 United Kingdom general election who had been so imprisoned. The guests were more broadly based.

=== Political candidate ===
Duckers made a speech in London on 14 January 1924, on the foreign policy of the first MacDonald ministry. He became a Liberal Party candidate, standing in the March 1924 Westminster Abbey by-election, chosen on 26 February conditional on Winston Churchill's candidacy. After running a skeleton campaign, he came bottom of the poll, with only 1.9% of the vote, one of the lowest on record for a major party, and behind Fenner Brockway in third, with Churchill placed second. David Lloyd George had refused to speak for him. Lloyd George said afterwards that Duckers was "just the type of candidate who tars Liberalism with the Little England brush." Duckers accused him of campaigning for "jingo Imperialism".

Writing in the April 1924 issue of Reconciliation, the organ of the Fellowship of Reconciliation, Duckers asked if Christianity and politics were compatible.

== Works ==
- A Guide to Students' Law Books and to Both Branches of the Legal Profession (1906)
- Newspaper Gambling Schemes (1907), pamphlet for the National Anti-Gambling League.
- The Licensing Bill 1908 (1908), text with notes by Duckers.
- "Workmen's Compensation from the Workman’s Point of View", article 17 July 1909 in Justice, the newspaper of the Social Democratic Federation
- Handed Over (1917), a memoir of his experiences as a conscientious objector, published by C. W. Daniel, with a foreword by Edmund Harvey.
