= Holdaway =

Holdaway is a surname. Notable people with the name include:

- Guy Holdaway (1886–1973), British athlete
- Hubert Holdaway (1896–1963), New Zealand teacher, orchardist, Methodist lay preacher and pacifist
- Jim Holdaway (1927–1970), British illustrator
- Richard Holdaway (born 1949), British space engineer
- Ronald M. Holdaway (born 1934), American military judge
- William Holdaway (1893–1967), New Zealand cricketer
