= Clara Gilbert Cole =

English campaigner (1868–1956)

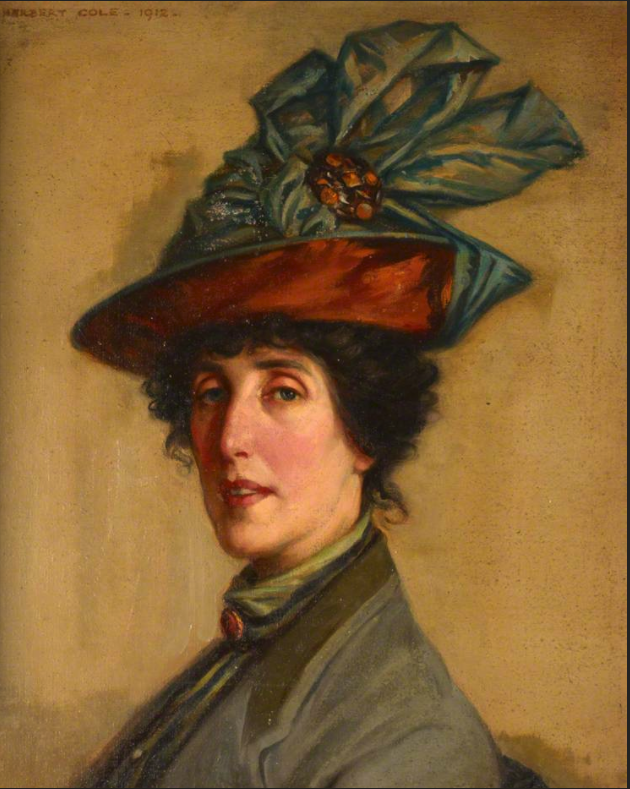
- 1912 painting by Herbert Cole
- Born: Clara Gilbert; 4 December 1868; Nantwich, Cheshire, England
- Died: 4 February 1956 (aged 87); London, England
- Occupations: Suffragist; socialist; anarchist; poet; pamphleteer
- Spouse: Herbert Cole (m. 1898; died 1931)

Clara Gilbert Cole (née Gilbert; 4 December 1868 – 4 February 1956) was an English suffragist, socialist, pacifist, anarchist, poet, and pamphleteer.

== Early life ==
Clara Gilbert was born in Nantwich, Cheshire on 4 December 1868, the daughter of Mary Jane Greaves and Josiah Gilbert, a boot and shoe manufacturer. According to Sylvia Pankhurst, Josiah Gilbert got into financial distress for his refusal to “produce anything save honest, hand-made all-leather wares”.

Her father and mother died in 1882 and 1883 respectively, leaving Clara an orphan. She found employment as a postal worker in Manchester, and met Herbert Cole, the artist who became her husband. They married in Cheetham, Manchester on 1 October 1898. Once married, Clara was known as Clara Gilbert Cole. The couple subsequently settled in London.

== Activism ==
Both Clara and Herbert were active suffragists, with Herbert Cole providing illustrations for both the Women's Social and Political Union (WSPU) (of which Clara was a member) and Pankhurst's The Worker’s Dreadnought.

Clara Gilbert Cole was a pacifist, and an outspoken opponent of the First World War. In 1915, ahead of the introduction of conscription, she and Herbert founded the League Against War and Conscription, with Clara publishing a pamphlet entitled War Won't Pay. When Fenner and Lilla Brockway established the No-Conscription Fellowship, the Coles were among its earliest members.

In 1916, Clara Gilbert Cole, along with Rosa Hobhouse, leafletted across Northamptonshire and Bedfordshire on behalf of the anti-war effort, and were arrested and imprisoned for five months. In 1918 Gilbert Cole published Prison Impressions, poems about prison experiences. She dedicated the book to "The Conscientious Objector", and used the preface to explain how she had come to be imprisoned:

To relate briefly the cause of our arrest, I will go back to Wednesday, May 10, 1916, when Rosa Hobhouse and myself set out from Knebworth, Herts., on a walking tour distributing literature for Peace. We were trying to create an atmosphere of love and brotherhood between all nationalities, instead of this deplorable feeling of hatred which at present exists and is daily being fomented by the Press. We had walked 50 miles and distributed 2,000 leaflets when we were arrested near Kettering, and detained in the police cell five days. After being twice remanded, we were brought up under the Defence of the Realm Act and were fined £50 each, or three months’ imprisonment. Not considering ourselves guilty, we refused to pay the fine or allow it to be paid for us, and were taken to Northampton prison. History has taught me that new ideas are always born in pain, so we are contented to suffer and be misunderstood in order that future generations might reap the benefit.

Clara Gilbert Cole was also associated with the Workers Socialist Federation (WSF), the Camberwell Organised Unemployed, and the anarchist movement. She wrote and published widely, contributing to publications including Guy Aldred’s The Word, Freedom Press’ War Commentary, and Northern Voice. During the 1930s, she supported the National Confederation of Trabajo (CNT) and the Anarchist Brigades during the Spanish Civil War. In 1936, she published The Objectors to Conscription and War: a record of their suffering and sacrifice, their letters and tribunal appeals, their testimony for liberty of conscience. Stephen Wade has described this as reading "at times like the memoir of a street fighter for justice mixed with rage against the warmongers."

== Death and legacy ==
Herbert Cole died in London on 12 September 1931, aged 64. Clara donated works of Herbert's to both the Victoria and Albert and the British Museum.

Clara Gilbert Cole died on 4 February 1956, aged 87. She was described by anarchist and editor of Freedom John Hewetson as “one of the oldest comrades of the anarchist movement”. He also noted Gilbert Cole's opposition to all established religion, which made the religious service performed at her funeral particularly inappropriate.
