= No More War Movement =

The No More War Movement was the name of two pacifist organisations, one in the United Kingdom and one in New Zealand.

== British group ==
The British No More War Movement (NMWM) was founded in 1921 as a pacifist and socialist successor to the No-Conscription Fellowship. For the first two years of its existence, it was known as the No More War International Movement. Chaired by Fenner Brockway, it asked members to strive for revolutionary socialism but not to take part in any war. In 1926, chairing the annual conference Brockway outlined a two-pronged strategy for peace in which peoples would resist any call to war by organised refusal to fight. The NMWM was distinctive among peace societies in advocating resistance to war. In 2012, the report of his strategy was re-run on its anniversary and in the context of parliamentary and public discussions about the commemoration of the First World War and learning the right lessons from history.

Other notable NMWM members included Wilfred Wellock, Leslie Paul, A. Barratt Brown, Leyton Richards, W. J. Chamberlain and Monica Whately. The movement also received messages of support from several international figures, including Albert Einstein. In 1926, a member proposed the creation of a white poppy, in the manner of the British Legion's red poppies, but with the added meaning of a hope for an end to all wars. The group did not pursue the idea, but it was later taken up by the Women's Co-operative Guild. At its peak, the NMWM numbered around 3000 members, many from the Independent Labour Party. In 1929, several prominent British intellectuals signed a statement, "Why I Believe in the No More War Movement", supporting the NMWM's aims. The group published two journals: The New World and No More War. It became the British section of War Resisters International.

After Brockway resigned in 1929, and secretaries Walter Ayles and Lucy Cox left in 1932, the group foundered. Reginald Reynolds, a Quaker influenced by Gandhi, became general secretary, but he could not stop a drift of members to the communist British Anti-War Movement and the New Commonwealth Society. Anarchists became increasingly prominent, but most left after the Movement, in accordance with its pacifist principles, refused to support the fighting of either side in the Spanish Civil War. In 1937 the organisation formally merged with the Peace Pledge Union, although the Midlands Council of the NMWM retained an independent existence for a year or so.

== New Zealand group ==
The New Zealand NMWM was founded in the 1920s by Fred Page (1899–1930). It strived to influence public opinion in New Zealand through petitions and public discussion. By the late 1930s it was losing influence to two other New Zealand pacifist bodies: the New Zealand branch of the Peace Pledge Union, and Archibald Barrington and Ormond Burton's Christian Pacifist Society of New Zealand.

== NMWN UK Publications ==
- No More War Movement: Remembrance: notes for Armistice Day (1927)
- Disarmament by example by Arthur Ponsonby (1927)
- Peace in our Time for all Time: The Rising Tide of War Resistance by Norman Cliff (1928)
- Militarism unmasked by Walter H Ayles (1928)
- The League's authority: war or public opinion? by A. Ruth Fry (1929)
- Election Points for Pacifists (1929)
- Fighting for Peace. The story of the war resistance movement. By W. J. Chamberlain, (1929)
- The Church, the Bible and War by Hector Macpherson (1929)
- A suppressed speech: militarism stripped too naked (1930)
- Burn your gunboats. The case for complete disarmament by Walter H Ayles (1930)
- Disarmament and unemployment by Walter H Ayles (1930)
- Can Britain disarm?: a reasoned case in fourteen points by A. Fenner Brockway (1930?)
- Youth and adventure: on which side shall I enlist? by Wilfred Wellock (1930?)
- What Fighting Means by C. E. M. Joad (1930?)
- Can the church lead the world to peace? by Hastings Russell, Duke of Bedford (1930)
- War as viewed by Jesus and the early church: a body of evidence by Wilfred Wellock (1931?)
- Will Disarmament Increase Unemployment? by Norman Angell (1931?)
- The Draft Disarmament Convention and the world conference by Gerald Bailey (1931)
- Gandhi's fast: its cause and significance by Reginald Reynolds (1932)
- Disarmament or disaster?: a review of the first phase of the disarmament conference and an indictment of the British government's policy by A J Brown (1932)
- Real cowards: a talk about the Disarmament Conference by "H. C." (1932)
- Your country is in danger!: if you love your country you should give this letter your most serious consideration: an open letter to every patriot. (1932)
- Shall We Arm the League? (1933)
- Death's Jamboree by Joseph Gorman (1934?)
- War and the workers: an appeal to the labour, trade union, and co-operative movements and the unemployed by Wilfred Wellock (1934)
- Revolt in the churches against armaments and war: being a symposium of articles contributed by leaders of Christian thought in support of disarmament by example by Wilfred Wellock (1934)
- Pacifism and the general strike. A constructive alternative to 'collective security' (1935)(with War Resisters' International)
- The Roots of War. A Handbook on War and the Social Order. Published jointly by the Friends Anti-War Group and the No More War Movement. (1935)
- You remember Abyssinia?: an analysis of events and some conclusions by Reginald Renyolds (1936)
- The truth behind the Palestine riots. An information bulletin. by Reginald Reynolds (1936)
- All about pacifism and armaments: something for Christians, trade unionists, Socialists, Liberals, Conservatives, co-operators, parents, teachers, women and militarists (1938)
