= Harry Thompson (lawyer) =

English radical lawyer (1885–1947)

William Henry Thompson (1885–1947) was an English lawyer closely involved with trade unions, who founded Thompsons Solicitors. From the 1920s he was associated with the Communist Party of Great Britain (CPGB). He was married to Joan Beauchamp, a prominent suffragette.

== Early life ==
He was the son of William Henry Thompson (c.1830–1904), a warehouse owner who ran a wholesale grocery business in Preston, Lancashire and Methodist, and his wife Martha née Thompson (died 1920); he was the younger son in a family of five girls and four boys. His maternal grandfather John Thompson was a Cumbrian, who prospered in Preston and was also a radical. His sister Constance Sumner Thompson was a schoolmistress and mother of A. J. P. Taylor. According to Taylor, Harry was the brightest child in a family of six, but a "clever-clogs". Margaret Cole described him as "a tall handsome athletic fellow, excelling in all games".

Harry Thompson was educated at Preston Grammar School. He was then articled in 1902 to William Bramwell & Co., Preston solicitors, through the support of Percy Taylor, Constance's husband and a close friend of George Lansbury. He was there for five years, and qualified as a solicitor in 1909. He set up on his own at Longton, Staffordshire. Coming into contact there with John Ward, Thompson from an early point had trade union work and close links.

== World War I ==
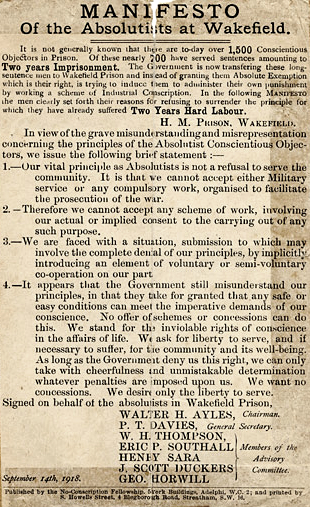
Wakefield Manifesto, 1918, signed by Harry Thompson, Walter Ayles, Henry Sara and others

Thompson practised in north Staffordshire. During World War I, he was from 1916 a conscientious objector, "absolutist" and on a principle of individual liberty. He received call-up papers in 1916, at an address in Stoke-on-Trent. He was drafted into the North Staffordshire Regiment, where he refused to obey orders, and was taken to court via a guardroom in Lichfield. He firstly received a six-month sentence. At a later hearing in 1917, he was sentenced to two years. Initially he in prisons at Durham and Newcastle upon Tyne.

Later, Thompson did time in Wakefield Gaol. It was converted in 1916 to a form of open prison, with the cell door locks removed, called Wakefield Work Centre. Thompson was on a representative committee elected by the inmates, with Walter Ayles, the pacifist organiser James Scott Duckers, and Henry Sara.

== Inter-war period ==
In April 1919 Thompson was released from prison. Over the summer, he was at Hawkshead with Percy and Connie Taylor (his sister), with Henry Sara staying; the Taylors hosted a succession of conscientious objector guests chosen by Harry. He also attended a gathering at Old Jordans, associated with the Friends' Ambulance Unit. There he met up with other contacts, including Joan Beauchamp, James Scott Duckers, Francis Meynell and C. H. Norman. Joan Beauchamp, whom he married in 1921, had acted as parliamentary secretary to the Non-Conscription Fellowship, and had written to him while he was in prison.

By then Thompson had numerous contacts among the conscientious objector network. His work in support of conscientious objectors and their families also gained him recognition from Quakers and pacifists. Based on advice, he moved his law practice to London. He found work there, and became a leading left-wing lawyer.

=== Scott Duckers & Thompson ===
Initially Thompson was in partnership with James Scott Duckers (1883–1941), another conscientious objector who had been imprisoned at Wakefield. The partnership began on 1 September 1919; its formation of the partnership was announced later in the month, with Thompson described as previously at Stoke-on-Trent. The bulk of its work was conveyancing.

Scott Duckers & Thompson defended James Winstone in a September 1919 libel action brought by Sir Eric Geddes. In 1920 Duckers was retained to defend John Frederick Hedley of the Socialist Labour Party, charged under the Defence of the Realm Act 1914.

==== 1921 cases ====
In January 1921, Thompson defended Harry Webb, a CPGB organiser in Sheffield. The firm defended a libel action in April 1921, brought in the wake of the Black Friday crisis by J. H. Thomas against the printers of The Communist, the National Labour Press, and its editor, Francis Meynell. Duckers in May 1921 appeared on behalf of Albert Rose, manager of the National Labour Press, in a case concerning literature related to the 3rd World Congress of the Comintern, printed for Albert Inkpin of the Communist Party of Great Britain (CPGB). Thompson had been asked to represent Inkpin, to avoid possible conflicts of his interests with the printers', early in May. Shortly after that he was defended by Henry Slesser.

Thompson was solicitor to Poplar Borough Council, and came to prominence in a fiscal case involving councillors that arose from the Poplar Rates Rebellion of 1921. In autumn of that year, as the protest began to spread through London boroughs, Thompson advised a group of imprisoned Poplar councillors in negotiations with a government minister, Alfred Mond, and successfully applied for a court order to have councillors from Poplar and Holloway released.

==== End of the partnership ====
Duckers and Thompson differed on party politics, however and went their own ways, a notice appearing that the partnership was dissolved from 31 August 1921. Duckers gave his views on trade unions at a Law Society conference in 1920. Thompson was then a Guild Socialist.

=== 1921 to 1930 ===
The firm Thompson founded after the split from Duckers is now known as Thompsons Solicitors. Duckers remained at 2 New Court off Carey Street, off Chancery Lane, while Thompson moved away.

During this decade, Thompson was a member of the Independent Labour Party (ILP). He did not join the CPGB as an individual, but the Central London branch of the ILP to which he belonged affiliated to the CPGB on its foundation in 1921. He left the CPGB after about two years, never to rejoin, his strong temperance views being incompatible with the CPGB attitude to alcohol. He continued in the long term as a legal adviser to it. He was a director of the Labour Publishing Co., effectively an arm of the Labour Research Department where he was on the Executive Committee from 1921 to 1926. It was with Robert Page Arnot, Walter Baker, H. N. Brailsford, G. D. H. Cole, Fred Hall of the Co-operative College, Henry Devenish Harben, W. H. Hutchinson, Bernard Langdon-Davies and George Lansbury.

Thompson was also legal counsel to Ramsay MacDonald. He gave advice to MacDonald, then Prime Minister, in 1924 on the handling of a gift of money and a car from Alexander Grant of McVitie's biscuits. The detailed advice was not taken. MacDonald then made Grant a baronet later that year, and found he was the target of embarrassing commentary. He felt constrained to return the gifts.

In 1925, 12 of the CPGB leaders were put on trial for seditious libel and incitement to mutiny. Thompson acted as their solicitor. The case, which was framed as conspiracy, came before Rigby Swift. Five of the defendants—William Gallacher, Wal Hannington, Albert Inkpin, Harry Pollitt, and William Rust—were imprisoned for 12 months, with others receiving shorter sentences. (Thompson had a shorthand record taken of the trial. The other seven accused were Robert Page Arnot, Thomas Bell, John Ross Campbell, Ernest Walter Cant, Arthur McManus, John Thomas Murphy, and Thomas Henry Wintringham.)

During the General Strike 1926, Shapurji Saklatvala was arrested on a sedition charge. Thompson defended him, Travers Humphreys prosecuting. In the Meerut Conspiracy Case of 1929, Thompson was retained by Benjamin Francis Bradley, Lester Hutchinson and Philip Spratt.

=== Trade union and compensation work ===
Thompson became a specialist in workers' compensation cases, for trades unions, particularly acting for the National Federation of Building Trade Operatives. In medico-legal cases he worked often with Thomas Morison Legge.

In 1947, the year of Thompson's death, his firm was retained by NUPBPW, a printing union, after a court case in which W. A. Morrison was defending a refusal to print material for a firm supporting Oswald Mosley. Around this period the firm began to send briefs in civil cases to Rose Heilbron, who later worked frequently for them.

=== Civil liberties ===
In the aftermath of a police raid on the offices of the National Unemployed Workers' Movement (NUWM) in 1932, Thompson visited Wal Hannington in Pentonville Prison. It led to an important test case, Elias v Pasmore, a victory on the police seizure of documents for the NUWM, which received damages in the absence of a search warrant, but a double-edged one in terms of the precedents set.

==== National Council for Civil Liberties, from 1934 ====
In the 1930s Thompson became a significant figure of the National Council for Civil Liberties (NCCL) as its chairman. In January 1935 he defended Roland Park and Ivan Seruya in Jarrow Police Court, on the charge of showing an "inflammable" film in the Miner's Hall, Boldon, the successful defence being funded by the NCCL and the British Institute of Adult Education, the secretary of which from 1934 was William Emrys Williams. The Home Office fire expert Lieutenant-Colonel Simmons testified that the film stock of commercial films generally was flammable. Seruya was a Londoner, a student at the Regent Street Polytechnic, a CPGB member involved in the Young Communist League and the Friends of the Soviet Union. He was under MI5 surveillance by 1933. He took part in the Workers' Theatre Movement, Kino as projectionist, and International Sound Films.

The NCCL was the target of a campaign by Hugh Trenchard and Sir Philip Game, successive Metropolitan Police Commissioners, that sought to represent it as a communist front, and discredit its work. The view of MI5 and Special Branch shifted from an assumption that Ronald Kidd, founder of the NCCL with Sylvia Crowther-Smith, was involved with the CPGB, to attention to a group of lawyers of left-wing views around the organisation, linked to the Haldane Society of Socialist Lawyers. Those included Geoffrey Bing, Dudley Collard, Neil Lawson and John Platts-Mills. Its General Purposes Committee included, as well as Kidd, Crowther-Smith and Thompson, some of those: Bing, Collard and Lawson. There were also on that committee Bruce Binford Hole, D. N. Pritt and, for a time, John Strachey.

Platts-Mills described in his memoirs the conduct of business on the NCCL committee as preceded by a meeting involving such lawyers. He stated that Thompson, after attending some of those meetings, put an end to them, out of concern for the NCCL's reputation.

== 1940s ==
Shortly before the outbreak of World War II in 1939, Thompson moved residence to Naphill, Buckinghamshire. John Platts-Mills stayed with him, during his time in the Royal Air Force based at Uxbridge. In The Blitz, Chancery Lane suffered bomb damage in summer 1940. John Horner of the Fire Brigades Union (FBU) made space available to W. H. Thompson & Co. in the union's London head office. Thompson also transferred his main law office, from London to High Wycombe.

After the formation in 1941 of the National Fire Service (NFS), from local fire brigades and the Auxiliary Fire Service (AFS), Horner worked with Thompson on the issues arising for the FBU. When Herbert Morrison expressed the view that the Trade Disputes and Trade Unions Act 1927 then meant that the FBU had to cut political links and limit union activities, Horner faced him down, based on Thompson's view that the Act meant no such thing as it stood. Horner went to Walter Citrine with Thompson's opinion, and Morrison backed down on applying the Act to the NFS. Morrison then had William Mabane bring up the status of NFS firefighters in parliament, as close to members of the armed forces.

Thompson's health deteriorated, ahead of his death on 4 August 1947. In 1946, Henry Schramek became sole partner of W. H. Thompson & Co. He was a CPGB member with close connections to the Fire Brigades Union. That year, Owen Parsons (1913/4–1986), who had joined the firm in 1936 and qualified as a solicitor in 1939, left on bad terms, taking some of the trade union business as he set up on his own account. He was a Haldane Society member trained by Thompson, and had been working at High Wycombe in the war years. O H Parsons LLP continues in the same fields of work.

== Works ==
- Workmen's Compensation: an outline of the Acts (1922), Labour Publishing Co.
- The Trade Union Bill (1927), pamphlet, LRD White Paper Number 35, foreword by George Hicks, London: Labour Research Department
- Civil Liberties (1938), Left Book Club. It has been called the first treatment of civil liberties in the United Kingdom.
- Workmen's compensation up to date (1944)
- "Trade Unions and the Law Today", chapter 6 in British Trade Unionism To-Day (1945), edited by G. D. H. Cole

== Family ==
Thompson knew Joan Beauchamp through the No-Conscription Fellowship. They were married on 1 August 1921 at Hampstead Meeting House. They had two sons, Robin (born 1924) and Brian (born 1926). There were family homes successively in Oxted, Welwyn Garden City and Hampstead Garden Suburb.

The sons both joined the Thompsons firm of solicitors in 1947, the year of their father's death. At a later point the brothers separated the firm into two partnerships, in 1974. Those merged again, in 1996.
