= Herbert Kohl =

Herbert Kohl could refer to:

- Herb Kohl (1935–2023), American politician from Wisconsin
- Herbert R. Kohl (born 1937), American educator

== See also ==
- Herbert Cole (1867–1930), English book illustrator and portrait artist
- Herbert Kohler Jr. (1939–2022), American plumbing manufacturing executive
