= William Canton =

British writer (1845–1926)

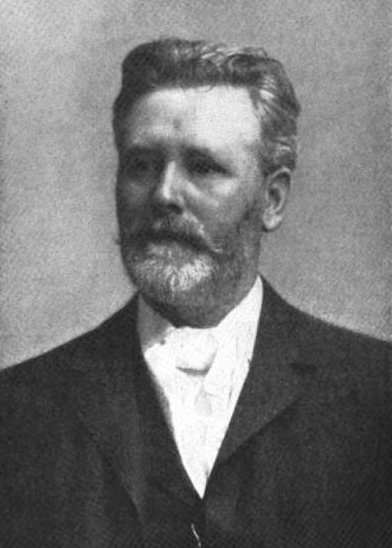
- In The Sketch, 22 July 1896
- Born: 27 October 1845; Chusan, China
- Died: 2 May 1926 (aged 80); Hendon, England
- Occupation: Writer
- Spouses: Emma Moore (m. 1874; died 1880) Annie Elizabeth Taylor (m. 1882)
- Children: 3

William Canton (27 October 1845 – 2 May 1926) was a British poet, journalist and writer, now best known for his contributions to children's literature. These include his series of three books, beginning with The Invisible Playmate, written for his daughter Winifred Vida (1891-1901). The book was read by the late nineteenth century English novelist George Gissing on New Year's Eve 1895. In his lifetime Canton was known for his use of recent archaeological evidence of prehistory in his poetry.

== Life ==
William Canton was born at Chusan in China on 27 October 1845, to a Catholic family of civil servants. His childhood was spent mostly in Jamaica. He studied for the priesthood at Douai School and later in Paris, but eventually abandoned the priesthood as a vocation to become a teacher and writer. He later left the Roman Catholic Church to become a Protestant. He worked as a journalist in London and Glasgow, where he became editor of the Glasgow Weekly Herald and later a leader-writer for the Glasgow Herald.

He married Emma Moore in 1874, and they had one daughter, who died in 1877. Emma died in 1880, and he remarried to Annie Elizabeth Taylor in 1882. They had a son and a daughter together.

In 1891 Canton moved to London, where he worked for the religious book and magazine publisher W. Isbister, later being appointed as editor of the Sunday Review and the Sunday Magazine . He also contributed articles and poems to Good Words.

In 1901 Canton's daughter Winifred died suddenly at the age of 10. He resigned from Isbister and took up the offer to write the official history of the Bible Society, which he hoped would comfort him. The nine volume history took five years to complete. He also published literature about Winifred: The Invisible Playmate, recollections of his daughter, W.V.: Her Book and Rhymes About a Little Woman.

Canton completed his history in 1910, after which he devoted himself to children's literature and historical works, including The Bible and the Anglo-Saxon People (1914) The Bible Story (1915).

He died at his home in Hendon on 2 May 1926.

== Poetry ==
Canton's early poetry was highly regarded in his lifetime for its attempt to represent in verse recent scientific theories, especially Darwinism, which he addressed in his poem Through the Ages (1879). Thomas Huxley supported Canton's attempts to introduce scientific terminology into verse. The Sanskritist Max Müller also praised Canton's works, writing that "I look upon them as equal to Matthew Arnold's poems, and having been an old friend and sincere admirer of Arnold, I could give no higher praise". Walter Pater, wrote to Canton that he gave expression to "primeval, pre-adamite, or pre-historic subjects...you have certainly made their poetic side your own".

Canton's later work was more religious in emphasis, but his output almost ceased after the death of his daughter. In 1913 Canton began a new religious poem The Mask of Veronica, but it was unfinished at his death.

== Quotations ==
And our lineage was hoary ere Eve's apple tree grew green;
For the Bee, whose drowsy humming
Was prophetic of Man's coming,
Lies in gem-like tomb of amber, buried in the Miocene.

— Through the Ages

What year was it that blew
The Aryan's wicker-work canoe
Which brought the shell to English land?
What prehistoric man or woman's hand,
With what intent, consigned it to this grave —
The barrow set in sound of the Ancient World's last wave?

— An Indian Cowrie found in a Cornish barrow at Land's End

== Works ==
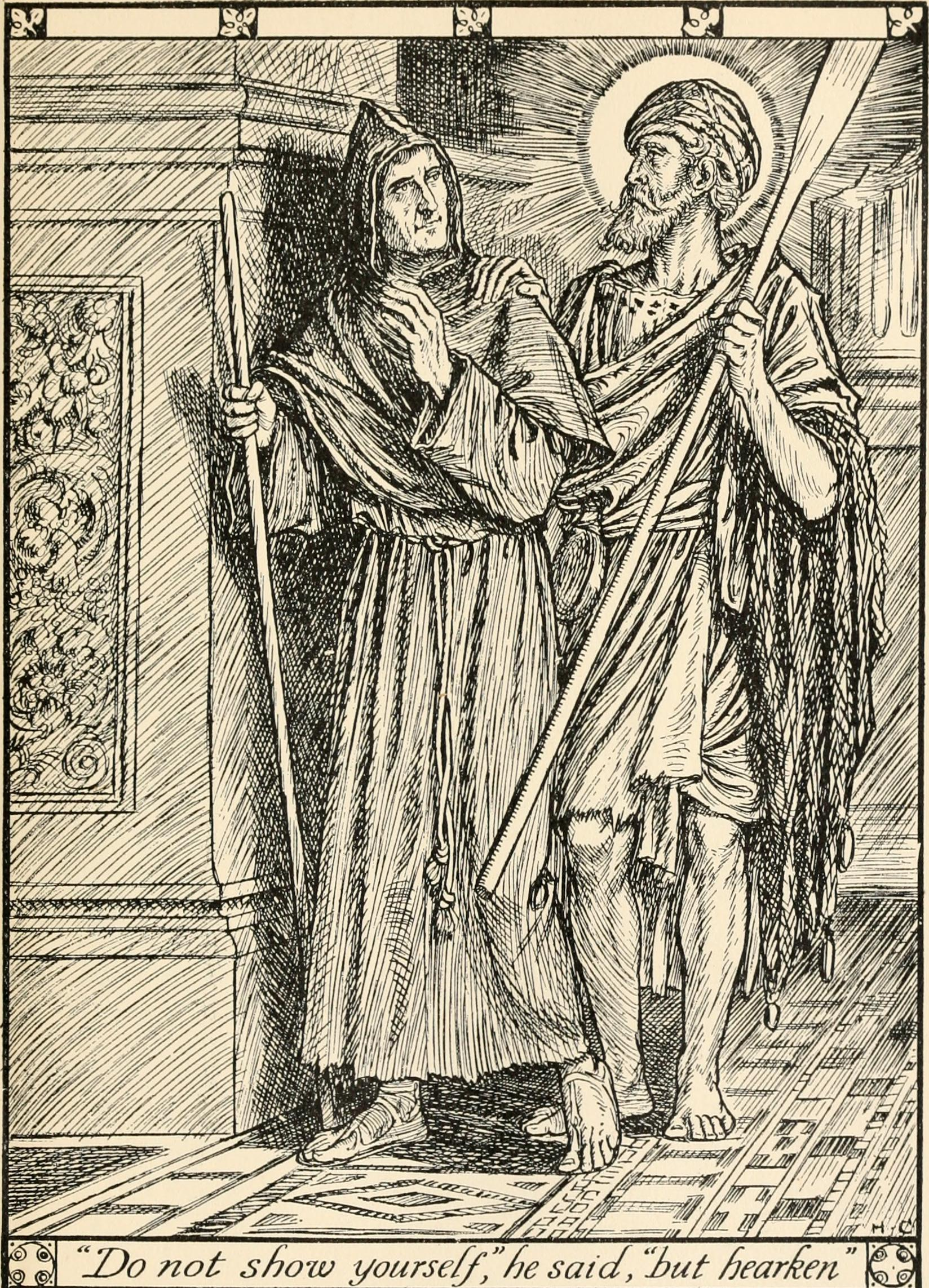
A Child's Book of Warriors illustration by Herbert Cole

- A Lost Epic and other poems (1887)
- The fairy princess, and other poems
- The Invisible Playmate: A Story of the Unseen (1894)
- W. V. Her Book (1896)
- W. V's Golden Legend (1898)
- A Child's Book of Saints 1907 (1898)
- Children's sayings : edited with a digression on the small people (1900)
- In memory of W. V. (1901)
- The Comrades (1902) poems
- A history of the British and Foreign Bible Society, 5 vols (1904-1910).
- The Bible and the Anglo-Saxon People (1914)
- Poems (1927, Harrap)
- A Child's Book of Warriors (1912) illustrated by Herbert Cole
