= Ethel Mannin =

English writer (1900–1984)

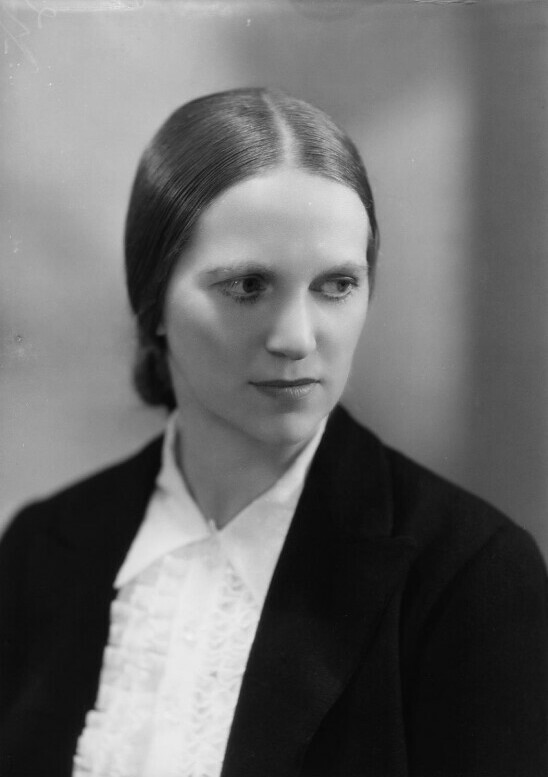
- Ethel Mannin on 6 June 1939
- Born: Ethel Edith Mannin; 6 October 1900; Clapham, London, England, UK
- Died: 5 December 1984 (aged 84); Teignmouth, Devon, England, UK
- Occupations: Novelist; Travel writer; Activist
- Spouses: John Alexander Porteus (m. 1919; sep. 1929) Reginald Reynolds (m. 1938; died 1958)
- Children: 1

Ethel Edith Mannin (6 October 1900 – 5 December 1984) was a popular British novelist and travel writer, anti-fascist activist and anarchist. She was born in London.

== Life and career ==
Mannin's father, Robert Mannin (d. 1948) was a member of the Socialist League who passed his left-wing beliefs on to his daughter. Mannin later stated that: "His socialism went a great deal deeper than any politics or party policy; it was the authentic socialism of the Early Christians, the true communism of 'all things in common' utterly – and tragically – remote from Stalinism". When at boarding school, following the outbreak of World War I, Mannin was asked to write an essay on "Patriotism". Hoping to impress her favourite teacher (a Communist sympathiser) Mannin's essay was an advocacy of anti-patriotic and anti-monarchist ideas. For writing the essay, Mannin's headmistress scolded her and made her kneel in the school hall all morning. Mannin often mentioned this incident in her autobiographies as shaping her later politics. Her writing career began in copy-writing and journalism. She became a prolific author, and also politically and socially concerned. Mannin's memoir of the 1920s, Confessions and Impressions sold widely and was one of the first Penguin paperbacks.

She initially supported the Labour Party but became disillusioned in the 1930s. Initially sympathetic to the Soviet Union, a 1936 visit there left her disillusioned with Stalinism, which she described in her book South to Samarkand. According to R. F. Foster "She was a member of the Independent Labour Party, and her ideology in the 1930s tended to anarcho-syndicalism rather than hardline Communism, but she was emphatically and vociferously left-wing". She came to support anarchism, and wrote about the Russian-born, American anarchist Emma Goldman, a colleague in the Solidaridad Internacional Antifascista at the time of the Spanish Civil War. Mannin was actively involved in anti-imperialist activity on behalf of African nations during the 1930s, and befriended George Padmore, C. L. R. James and Chris Braithwaite who were leading figures involved in these movements. Mannin was actively involved in anti-fascist movements, including the Women's World Committee Against War and Fascism. Mannin supported the military actions of the Spanish Republic but opposed the Second World War.

Mannin listed Bart de Ligt and A. S. Neill as thinkers who influenced her ideas. She described W. Somerset Maugham and Aldous Huxley as the writers she most admired, called Norman Haire the "one completely rational person she had ever met" and stated her "opposition to capital punishment, orthodox education and blood sports".

In 1943 she wrote the introduction to Dame Kathleen Lonsdale's Some Account of Life in Holloway Prison for Women, an influential report written for and published by the Prison Medical Reform Council

Mannin's 1944 book Bread and Roses: A Utopian Survey and Blue-Print has been described by historian Robert Graham as setting forth "an ecological vision in opposition to the prevailing and destructive industrial organization of society".

In 1954, Mannin was one of several signatories to a letter protesting against mass executions of Kenyans by the colonial government who had been "charged with offences less than murder".

In her seventies, Mannin still described herself as an anti-monarchist "Republican" and a "Tolstoyan anarchist".

She married twice: in 1919, a short-lived relationship from which she gained one daughter, Jean Porteous, a conscientious objector in WW2, for whom she gave evidence at a Tribunal; and in 1938 to Reginald Reynolds, a Quaker and go-between in India between Mahatma Gandhi and the British authorities. In 1934–35 she was in an intense but problematic intellectual, emotional and physical relationship with W. B. Yeats, who was on the rebound from Margot Ruddock and about to fall for Dorothy Wellesley (a detailed account is in historian R. F. Foster's biography of Yeats, concluding mainly that her emotional engagement was much less than his). She also had a well-publicised affair with Bertrand Russell.

Following a fall at her Shaldon home in July 1984, Mannin died from a combination of heart failure and pneumonia at Teignmouth Hospital on 5 December of that same year.

== Works ==
=== Memoirs ===
- Confessions and Impressions, London: Jarrolds, n.d. [1930]
- All Experience, London: Jarrolds, 1932
- Forever Wandering, London: Jarrolds, 1934
- South to Samarkand, London: Jarrolds, 1936
- Privileged Spectator, London: Jarrolds, 1939
- Connemara Journal, London: John Westhouse, October 1947
- German Journey (1948)
- Jungle Journey: 7000 Miles through India and Pakistan (1950)
- This Was a Man: Some Memories of Robert Mannin by His Daughter (1952)
- Moroccan Mosaic (1953)
- Land of the Crested Lion: A Journey through Modern Burma (1955)
- The Country of the Sea: Some Wanderings in Brittany (1957)
- Brief Voices (1959)
- The Flowery Sword: Travels in Japan (1960)
- With Will Adams Through Japan (1962)
- A Lance for the Arabs: A Middle East Journey (1963)
- Aspects of Egypt: Some Travels in the United Arab Republic (1964)
- Report from Iraq (1964)
- Young in the Twenties: A Chapter of Autobiography (1971)
- Stories from My Life (1973)
- Sunset over Dartmoor: A Final Chapter of Autobiography (1977)

=== Other works ===
- Martha, London: Leonard Parsons, 1923 (novel)
- Hunger of the Sea, London: Jarrolds, November 1924 (novel)
- Sounding Brass, London: Jarrolds, January 1926 (novel)
- Pilgrims, London: Jarrolds, 1927 (novel)
- Green Willow, London: Jarrolds, n.d. [1928] (novel)
- Crescendo, Being the Dark Odyssey of Gilbert Stroud, London: Jarrolds, 1928 (novel)
- Three Stories of Romance with Warwick Deeping and Gilbert Frankau, Daily Express Fiction Library, n.d. [1929]. Contains “Forbidden Music” by Mannin.
- Children of the Earth, London: Jarrolds, n.d. [January 1930] (novel)
- Ragged Banners (1931)
- Bruised Wings and Other Stories, London: Wright & Brown, 1931
- Common-sense and the Child (1931)
- Green Figs (1931) stories
- The Tinsel Eden and Other Stories, London: Wright & Brown, 1931
- Linda Shawn (1932)
- Love's Winnowing, London: Wright & Brown, 1932 (stories)
- Venetian Blinds (1933)
- Dryad (1933) stories
- Men Are Unwise (1934)
- Foreword to Some Adventures with a School (1934) by Margaret Johnston
- Cactus (1935)
- The Falconer's Voice (1935)
- Spain and Us (with J. B. Priestley, Rebecca West, Stephen Spender, Francis Meynell, Louis Golding, T. F. Powys, J. Langdon-Davies, Catherine Carswell) (1936)
- The Pure Flame (1936)
- Women Also Dream (1937)
- Common-Sense and the Adolescent (1937)
- The Song of the Bomber (c.1937) (poem)
- Women and the Revolution (1938)
- Rose and Sylvie (1938)
- Darkness My Bride (1938)
- Julie: The story of a dance-hostess (1940)
- Rolling in the Dew (1940)
- Against Race-Hatred and for a Socialist Peace (with Richard Acland, Vera Brittain, G. D. H. Cole, Victor Gollancz, Augustus John, James Maxton and J. B Priestley) (1940)
- Christianity ― Or Chaos? A Re-Statement of Religion (1941; revised edition 1946)
- Commonsense and Morality (1941)
- Red Rose: A Novel based on the Life of Emma Goldman (1941)
- Captain Moonlight (1942)
- The Blossoming Bough (1942)
- Castles in the Street (1942)
- Proud Heaven (1943)
- No More Mimosa (1943)
- Bread and Roses: An Utopian Survey and Blue-Print (1944)
- Comrade O Comrade, or, Low-Down on the Left (1945)
- Lucifer and the Child (1945)
- Selected Stories (1946)
- The Dark Forest (1946)
- Why I Am Still a Pacifist (with Catherina de Ligt, Hugh Fausset, Laurence Housman, Clare Sheridan, Alex Wood, and Myrtle Wright) (1946).
- Bavarian Story (1948)
- Late Have I Loved Thee (1948)
- Every Man a Stranger (1949)
- At Sundown the Tiger (1951)
- The Fields at Evening (1952)
- The Wild Swans and Other Tales Based on the Ancient Irish (1952)
- Lover under Another Name (1953)
- So Tiberius … (1954)
- Two Studies in Integrity: Gerald Griffin and the Rev. Francis Mahony ("Father Prout") (1954)
- The Living Lotus (1956)
- Pity the Innocent (1957)
- Fragrance of Hyacinths (1958)
- Ann and Peter in Sweden (1959)
- The Blue-eyed Boy (1959)
- Ann and Peter in Japan (1960)
- Sabishisha (1961)
- Ann and Peter in Austria (1962)
- Curfew at Dawn (1962)
- The Road to Beersheba, London: Hutchinson, 1963 (novel)
- Rebels' Ride. A Consideration of the Revolt of the Individual (1964)
- Lovely Land: The Hashemite Kingdom of Jordan (1965)
- The Burning Bush (1965)
- Loneliness: A Study of the Human Condition (1966)
- The Night and Its Homing (1966)
- The Lady and the Mystic (1967)
- An American Journey (1967)
- Bitter Babylon (1968)
- England for a Change (1968)
- The Saga of Sammy-Cat (1969)
- Practitioners of Love. Some Aspects of the Human Phenomenon (1969)
- The Midnight Street (1969)
- England at Large (1970)
- Free Pass to Nowhere (1970)
- My Cat Sammy (1971)
- England My Adventure (1972)
- The Curious Adventure of Major Fosdick (1972)
- Mission to Beirut (1973)
- An Italian Journey (1974)
- Kildoon (1974)
- The Late Miss Guthrie (1976)

=== Short stories ===
- "The Unremembered Years". John Bull, 28 December 1929
