= Reginald Reynolds =

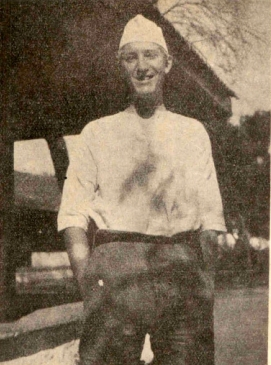
- Reginald Reynolds c. 1930
- Born: Reginald Arthur Reynolds; 1905
- Died: 16 December 1958 (aged 53); Adelaide, South Australia
- Education: Friends' School, Saffron Walden; Woodbrooke Quaker Study Centre
- Occupations: Writer; Campaigner
- Movement: Anti-colonialism; Peace; Anarchism
- Spouse: Ethel Mannin (m. 1938)

Reginald Arthur Reynolds (1905 – 16 December 1958) was a British left-wing writer, poet, a Quaker and an anti-colonial activist who collaborated with M.K. Gandhi and Horace Alexander.

He was from a Quaker background, the son of Bryant Reynolds of Clark, Morland & Co. He was General Secretary of the No More War Movement from 1933 to 1937.

He was perhaps best known as a critic of British imperialism in India, and for his 1937 work The White Sahibs in India. For many years he was also New Statesman's weekly satirical poet.

He married the left wing novelist Ethel Mannin in 1938.

He was a conscientious objector during the Second World War, when he worked in Air Raid Precautions and in a mobile hospital unit. In the 1950s, he traveled through East and Central Africa and wrote of his experiences.

== Works ==
- India, Gandhi and World Peace (1931)
- Police and Peasantry in India (1932)
- Gandhi's Fast: its cause and significance (1932)
- The White Sahibs in India (1937)
- Prison Anthology (edited with A. G. Stock) (1938)
- Why India? (1942)
- Cleanliness and Godliness: or The Further Metamorphosis. A discussion of the problems of sanitation raised by Sir John Harington, etc. (1943)
- The New Indian Rope Trick: or What became of the debt? (1943)
- The Fallow Ground of the Heart (1945)
- Og and other Ogres (1946) with illustrations by Quentin Crisp
- The Wisdom of John Woolman: with a selection from his writings as a guide to the seekers of today (1948)
- British Pamphleteers (edited with George Orwell) (1948) George Orwell and Reginald Reynolds, British Pamphleteers: From the Sixteenth Century to the French Revolution (London, 1948).
- Beards: Their Social Standing, Religious Involvements, Decorative Possibilities, and Value in Offence and Defence Through the Ages (1949)
- Beards: an omnium gatherum (1950)
- Beds: with many noteworthy instances of lying on, under, or about them (1951)
- To Live in Mankind: A Quest for Gandhi (1951)
- A Quest for Gandhi (1952)
- Beware of Africans: a pilgrimage from Cairo to the Cape (1955)
- My Life and Crimes (1956)
- John Somervell Hoyland (1958)
- John Woolman and the 20th century (1958)
- The True Book about Mahatma Gandhi (1959)
- The Loadstone (1960)

== Bibliography ==
- Robert Huxter, Reg and Ethel: Reginald Reynolds his life and work and his marriage to Ethel Mannin (1992). Sessions Book Trust. ISBN 978-1850721093
- Autobiography, My life and crimes (1956)
