= Riverside Community, New Zealand =

Coordinates: 41°09′52″S 172°59′45″E

Riverside Community is a village at Lower Moutere, near Motueka, New Zealand, founded by Christian pacifists in 1941.

== History ==
Riverside is one of the oldest intentional communities in New Zealand and has its beginnings in 1941 when a group of Christian pacifists agreed to adopt a way of life based on co-operation. They wanted to demonstrate that this was a practical alternative to the competitive ways of normal society which are a major contributor to wars.

One of the organisers was the pacifist leader Archibald Barrington.

One of the group contributed 30 acres of farmland and orchard, in the Lower Moutere Valley, and some of them moved there to live. Several of the founding members were conscientious objectors to the compulsory military scheme during the Second World War. These men spent the war years on a prison farm in the Taranaki region while their wives and children moved to the small farm in Lower Moutere. After the war, the Religious Charitable Riverside Community Trust (RCT) was founded and, over time, new land was purchased and the hilly scrub land cleared and cultivated.

== Community life and living ==
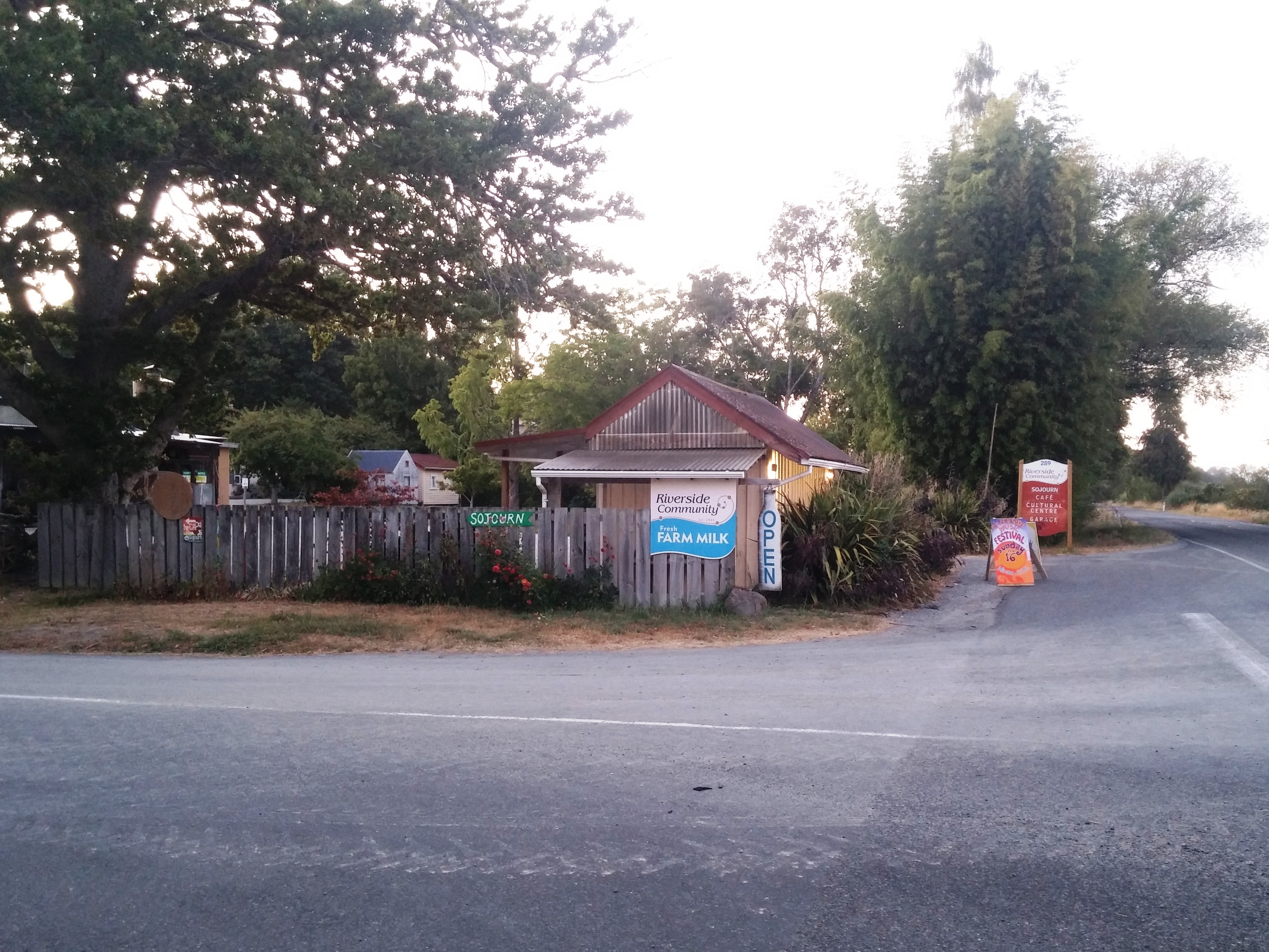
Sojourn Cafe at the Riverside Community

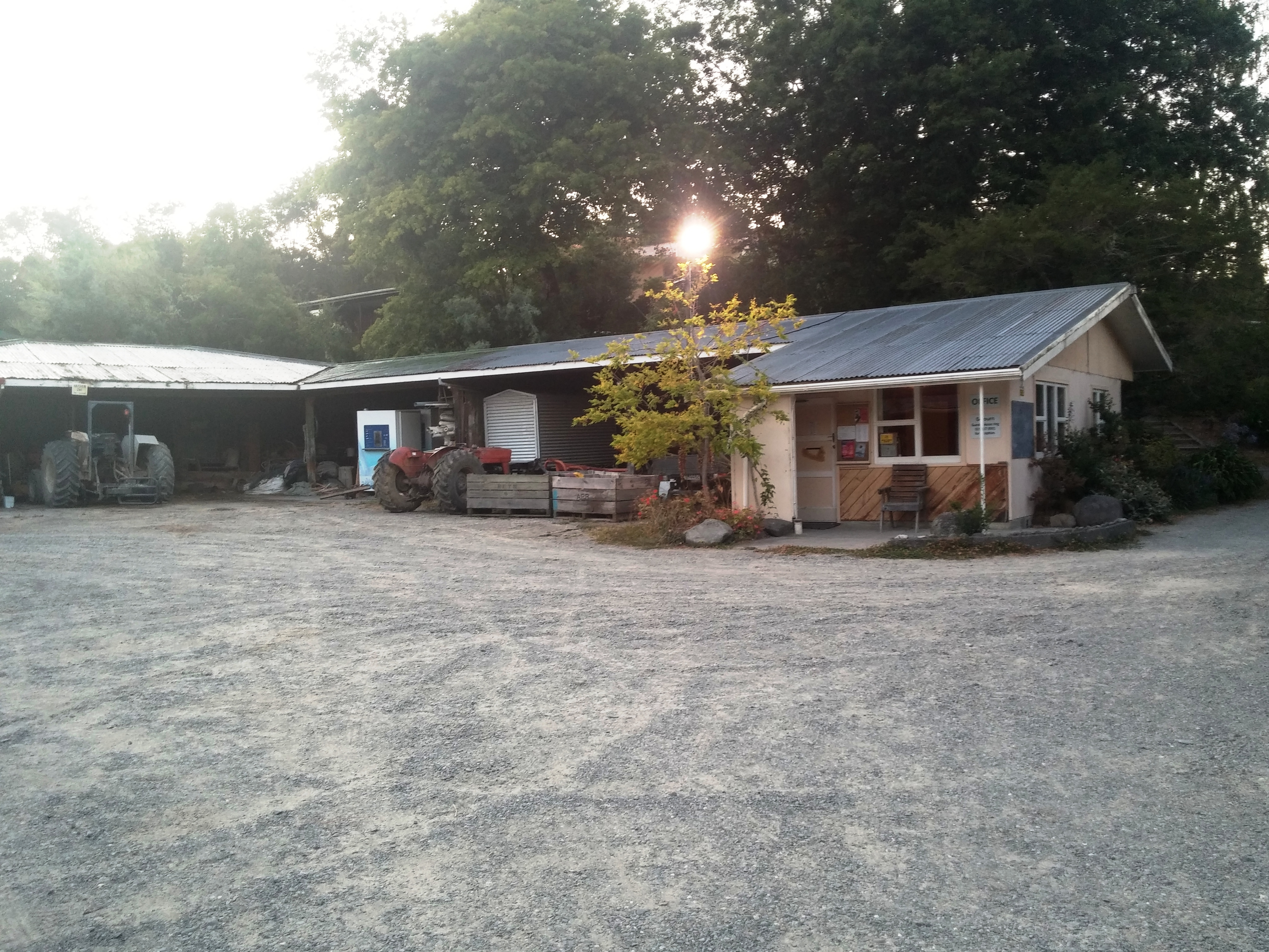
Office at the Riverside Community

Today Riverside consists of 208 hectares of land, mainly used as a dairy farm. It has a growing number of secondary businesses including a cafe, a community centre, orchards, organic gardens and a shop. Income is shared and distributed depending on family size rather than occupation. Riverside assets are owned by the Trust and there is no private ownership of houses or cars. The community's general fund helps to meet basic needs such as health care, dental care, electricity and phone while other needs are subsidised like education and travel costs. Community families live in self-contained homes and children attend local schools or choose to home educate.

The farm produces beef, dairy products, eggs and vegetables to supply either members and local neighbours. There is a shared lunch every Wednesday open to everyone. Permanent members are about 20 adult members and 10 children, but a limited number of tenants, visitors and volunteer workers can sometimes swell the numbers to 80.

There are several festivals and commemorations held each year: Spring Festival, Harvest festival, Winter Solstice, Easter, Christmas, Riverside Founders Day, Matariki, International Conscientious Objectors Day and commemorate Parihaka Peace Day.

== Notable people ==
- Archibald Charles Barrington
- Hubert Reginald Holdaway

== Bibliography ==
- Barrington, Rosemary Eleanor. (1976). Riverside: a community in the country. Wellington N.Z. Reed Education. ISBN 0-589046-40-3
- Parr, Arnold Richard. (1994). The development of collective ownership and control by an intentional community : an analysis of the organisation of Riverside Community in New Zealand. Christchurch N.Z. Sociology Dept., University of Canterbury Press. ISBN 0-908859-08-2
- Rain, Lynn (1991). Community, the story of Riverside, 1941-1991. Lower Moutere, New Zealand. Riverside Community Press.
