= Joan Beauchamp =

British activist (1890–1964)

Constance 'Joan' Beauchamp
- Born: 1 November 1890; Midsomer Norton, England
- Died: 1964 (aged 73–74)
- Citizenship: United Kingdom
- Known for: Suffragette activism. Co-founder of the Communist Party of Great Britain (CPGB). One of University of London's first female graduates.
- Notable work: Agriculture in Soviet Russia (1931); Women who Work (1937); Soviet Russia, A syllabus for study courses (1943)
- Spouse: Harry Thompson
- Children: 2, Robin (son); Brian (son)
- Relatives: Kay Beauchamp (sister); Frank Beauchamp (first cousin once removed)

Constance 'Joan' Beauchamp (1 November 1890 – 1964) was a British anti-World War I campaigner, suffragette and co-founder of the Communist Party of Great Britain.

== Childhood ==
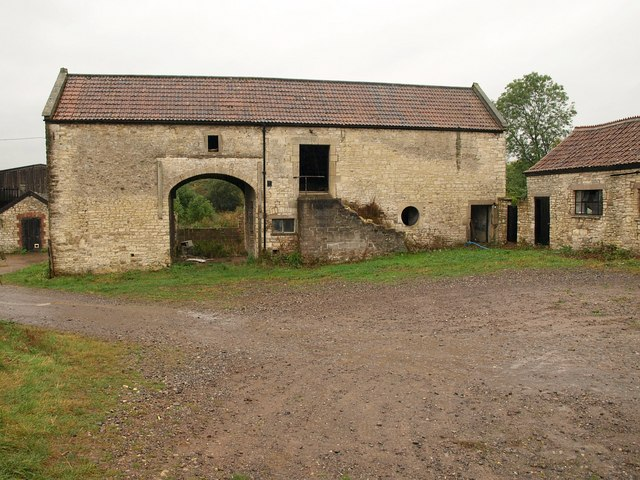
Welton Manor Farm, Midsomer Norton, where she grew up

She was born in 1890 into a farming family in Welton, Midsomer Norton in Somerset. She was the sister of Kay Beauchamp, who went on to become a fellow founder member of the Communist Party of Great Britain. The family was part of the Beauchamp family that dominated the Somerset coalfield, her father being the cousin of Sir Frank Beauchamp and Louis Beauchamp who owned coalmines in the area. Her mother died in 1904 when Joan was fourteen.

== Early adult life ==
During the First World War, Beauchamp became active in the No Conscription Fellowship (NCF). The NCF was established to help and give advice to the estimated 16,000 pacifists and socialists who refused to join the military and fight. In 1920 she received a ten-day prison sentence for her anti-war activities.

She was one of the founders and a lifelong member of the Communist Party of Great Britain and an associate of suffragette Sylvia Pankhurst. She was regarded as one of the suffragette movement's most militant members.

She was a supporter of the Soviet Union's collectivisation of agriculture and published a book, Agriculture in Soviet Russia (1931), on the subject and an article claiming she "completely failed to find" any "signs of famine" during her 1933 visit to Ukraine (at the time of the Holodomor) and that "nowhere" did she "find the word 'famine' used by the people themselves".

She was one of the first women graduates of the University of London. She married Harry Thompson, a lawyer and colleague from her time in NCF. They had two sons, Robin (born 1924), and Brian, both of whom became notable trade union lawyers.

== Later life ==
Beauchamp went on to be a journalist in London. During the Second World War she received severe injuries from a German flying bomb.

She provided support to her husband's law firm which catered only for trade unions and their members. Beauchamp's husband Harry Thompson died in 1947. She died in 1964.

== Books written by Joan Beauchamp ==
- Poems of revolt: a twentieth century anthology chosen by Joan Beauchamp (1924)
- Agriculture in Soviet Russia (1931)
- Women who Work (1937)
- Soviet Russia, A syllabus for study courses (1943)
- Scientific socialism
