= William Joseph Chamberlain =

William Joseph Chamberlain (born 1884, died 1945) was an English journalist and pacifist. He was a member (since 1914) of the No-Conscription Fellowship during the First World War and edited its newspaper, The Tribunal. He was also the national organizing secretary of the No-Conscription Fellowship. In 1916, Chamberlain, with almost the entire National Committee, was summoned to appear at the Palace of London under the Defense of the Realm Act (DORA) for the publication of a 'Repeal the Act' leaflet. According to the subpoena, the leaflet contained material damaging to the recruitment and discipline of His Majesty's Forces. The members of the national committee, 8 of them, were fined one hundred pounds each. Although the Fellowship paid the fines, most members of the national committee, including Chamberlain, chose to serve their sentences in prison. This demonstrated the government's determination to limit or eliminate organized anti-conscription and anti-war agitation through the provisions of DORA.

In 1916, Chamberlain was called into service and was denied exemption. In 1917, Chamberlain was charged with being absent and handed over to the army. He was sentenced to 2 years of hard labor at Wormwood Scrubs and Winchester. Chamberlain was released from prison in 1918 due to poor health.

After the war, he managed the Labour Party's press office and edited the party's Birmingham weekly The Town Crier. Chamberlain was a journalist for the official newspaper of the Labor Party and the Trade Union Congress, Daily Citizen. In 1921, he presided over the meeting in London (with Fenner Brockway and others) which established the No More War Movement, and became its Chairman.
