= Lilla Brockway =

British suffragist, socialist and pacifist

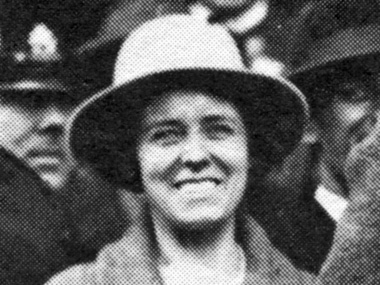
- Born: Lilla Harvey-Smith; 8 March 1889; Hackney, London, England
- Died: 1974 (aged 84–85); Maidstone, Kent, England
- Occupation(s): Suffragist and pacifist
- Organisation(s): Independent Labour Party; National Union of Women's Suffrage Societies; No-Conscription Fellowship
- Known for: Initiating the No-Conscription Fellowship
- Movement: Socialism, Suffrage, Conscientious Objection
- Spouse: Fenner Brockway (married 1914–45)
- Children: 4

Lilla Brockway (née Harvey-Smith; 8 March 1889 – 1974) was a British suffragist, socialist, and pacifist. It was a suggestion of Lilla's which initiated the No-Conscription Fellowship. As such, it has been written that Lilla Brockway "may truly be regarded as the Mother of the British C.O. [conscientious objectors'] movement".

== Early life ==
Lilla Harvey-Smith was born in Hackney, London, the daughter of Lizzie Harrison (1856-1909) and the Revd. William Harvey-Smith (1851-1923). She attended Eltham Training College, and went on to work as a teacher.

In 1914, she married politician and campaigner Fenner Brockway. They had four daughters. During their marriage, Fenner Brockway had several affairs, and they divorced in 1945.

== No-Conscription Fellowship ==
In 1914, anticipating the introduction of military conscription for the First World War, Lilla Brockway suggested that a group should be formed to unite those who planned to refuse. In his memoir, Inside the Left, Fenner Brockway recalled:

It was in November, 1914, that my wife (we had married a fortnight after the outbreak of war) made the proposal that those who intended to refuse military service should band themselves together, and we issued an invitation to prospective resisters to join a “No-Conscription Fellowship". Lilla acted as the provisional secretary and our cottage in Derbyshire was the headquarters. We had little idea then of how big the organisation would become or of the sort of conflict in which it was destined to take part.

Fenner Brockway's letter to the Labour Leader in November 1914 elicited 300 replies, leading to the formation of the No-Conscription Fellowship. This created, historian Sheila Rowbotham has written, "an organization which could bring together socialists, feminists, pacifists, radical liberals and Christian opponents to military conscription and defend the young men who had to go before military tribunals if they refused to fight".

Lilla initially undertook the administration, but as the organisation grew and branches were established across the country (61 by the following November) it was moved onto a more formal footing. In early 1915, a London office was established, run by Clifford Allen.

In December 1914, along with 100 other British women, Lilla Brockway was a signatory of the Open Christmas Letter; a message of peace addressed "To the Women of Germany and Austria".

Fenner Brockway's opposition to military conscription saw him imprisoned four times during the war, for a total of 28 months. His last imprisonment came in July 1917, when he was sentenced to two years' hard labour, serving the last eight months of his sentence in solitary confinement. Nonetheless, Fenner Brockway later wrote:

Often I think that our wives had a harder time than those of us who were prisoners; they had to live in the middle of a war-mad world and to undergo the contumely which opposition to the war and relationship to an imprisoned “conchy” involved. Lilla did it with unfailing courage, living for many months in a bare caravan, looking after Audrey and Margaret, mere babies, going through the last eight months with only one letter from me.

While Fenner was in gaol, Lilla and her two children had been living at a pacifist-community centre in Stanford-le-Hope, Essex.

== After the war ==
Lilla Brockway reported that her marriage was a happy one until 1929, when she saw a change in her husband. With Lilla now deaf, Fenner was reportedly frustrated by having to raise his voice to make her hear. He also had several affairs. She was granted a divorce in 1945 on grounds of adultery.

Lilla Brockway died in 1974 in Maidstone, Kent.
