= British Council for Peace in Vietnam =

British peace campaign

- Formation: 1965; 61 years ago
- Location: United Kingdom
- Formerly called: At times known as: • British Campaign for Peace in Vietnam • National Vietnam Campaign Committee

The British Council for Peace in Vietnam was formed in April 1965 and later became the British Campaign for Peace in Vietnam. It was also known as the National Vietnam Campaign Committee.

Fenner Brockway was a president. Amicia Young was a secretary who kept many records and papers of this organisation.

== See also ==
- Vietnam War
