= Richard Holdaway =

British space engineer

Richard Holdaway, CBE, FREng (born 1949) is a Professor of Spacecraft Engineering, Chairman of three hi-tech companies, and ex-Head of RAL Space, at the Rutherford Appleton Laboratory.

== Life and works ==
Educated at The Skinners' School, Tunbridge Wells, he earned his PhD in aeronautics and astrodynamics at the University of Southampton, He is a visiting professor at the University of Southampton, the University of Kent, the Beihang University (formerly the University of Aeronautics & Astronautics in Beijing) and Embry-Riddle University in Prescott AZ. He worked on the design of the Harrier jump jet (VTOL) aircraft at Hawker Siddeley before joining the Appleton Laboratory in 1974 and RAL in 1980. He has over 50 years of experience in space programmes, having worked on numerous missions in space science and earth observation with NASA, ESA, China, Russia and the UK National Programme. He was appointed director of Space Science and Technology at RAL (now RAL Space) in 1998. Under his directorship, RAL-Space merged fundamental space science with cutting-edge technological and engineering developments. He has had a role in several space technology spin-out companies. In 2012 he joined the board of directors of Canadian Company UrtheCast and in 2014 joined the Board of Stratospheric Platforms Ltd (SPL), in 2022 becoming its Chairman. He is also Chairman and CEO of Cambridge Space Associates and Chairman of Global Imaging Systems. In 2013 he was appointed a CBE in recognition of his services to UK space engineering, his work with the Royal Academy of Engineering, his long association with Southampton University and his numerous public outreach lectures. He lectures regularly at Universities and Colleges, to governments, and gives public talks including on the Cunard liners Queen Mary, Queen Victoria and Queen Elizabeth. His lectures include a series entitled "Journeys through Space & Time", covering: Space History, Astronomy, The Planets, Planet Earth from Space, Climate Change, Future Space Missions, and Things that have gone wrong in Space.

== Selected works ==
- R. Holdaway, Is space global disaster warning and monitoring now nearing reality?, Space Policy, 17, (2), 127-132, doi: 10.1016/S0265-9646(01)00009-1, 2001
- R. Holdaway, The British Space Program, in Advances in the Astronautical Sciences (Edited by Hoots, F.R., Kaufman, B., Cefola, P.J., and Spencer, D.B., 97, (1/2), 1437-1442, 1998
- R. Holdaway, UK instruments for mission to planet Earth, Space Technology - industrial and commercial applications, 13, (6), 561-567, 1993
- J.-J. Miau, and R. Holdaway (eds), Reducing the Cost of Spacecraft Ground Systems and Operations, Vol. 3., Springer, 2000
