= Edward Grubb (Quaker) =

English Quaker

Edward Grubb (19 October 1854 – 23 January 1939) was an influential English Quaker who made significant contributions to revitalizing pacifism and a concern for social issues in the Religious Society of Friends in the late 19th century as a leader of the movement known as the Quaker Renaissance. He also wrote a number of hymns including Our God, to Whom we turn. He would later play a major role in the No-Conscription Fellowship, an organization that united and supported conscientious objectors in Britain during World War One.

== Early career ==
Grubb was born in Sudbury, Suffolk, educated at Bootham School, York and studied at the University of Leeds and University of London. He began his career as a teacher when he returned to Bootham School in York, England. Bootham is a boarding school for boys of the Religious Society of Friends. Grubb had attended the school himself, beginning in 1868 at the age of fourteen. He would later move on to teach at a number of other schools, including other Quaker schools. He received his B.A. in 1876 and in 1877 married Emma M. Horsnail of Bulford Mill, who he had courted for seven years.

== Struggles with faith and science ==
While preparing for his M.A. examination in 1879, he had a crisis of faith resulting from his inability to reconcile science with the religious beliefs he had grown up with. He initially found it impossible to see how any serious intellectual could also be religious. He did not find any satisfaction in agnosticism; however, and remained open to a solution to his intellectual problems that included belief in God. In the 1880s Grubb began to develop an interest in social concerns, even cutting back on his teaching in order to devote time to the study of economics and to public work. In keeping with his desire to reconcile faith with science, Grubb was among those who vocally and successfully opposed the adoption of the Richmond Declaration by London Yearly Meeting in 1888. Soon after, as a result of his regular participation in meeting for worship, Grubb was officially recorded as a minister in the Religious Society of Friends. At the time, he still did not feel he had a firm basis for his faith, but was confident that it would come with time.

== Major contributions ==
Grubb would go on to be a major leader of British Quakerism, a prolific religious author, and a key member of a number of religious and social organizations, including the No-Conscription Fellowship. Like most pacifists of his generation, his absolute pacifist stance was born from the disillusionment with the Boer War. From 1901 to 1906 he was secretary of the Howard Association. As secretary, in 1904 he visited Washington D.C. and met President Theodore Roosevelt, of which he said:

The whole interview cannot have lasted two minutes. I am very glad to have had it, and to see how entirely simple and unconventional American democracy is. It was impossible to feel nervous – everything was so wholly plain and ordinary.

== Death and final resting place ==
The Oxford Dictionary of National Biography records that Grubb was buried on 26 January 1939 at the Hitchin Quaker burial ground. However, the Hertford & Hitchin Monthly Meeting minutes of 4 February 1939 state quite clearly: "He was cremated at Golders Green 27th 1. 39., the death having been registered at Letchworth 25th 1st mo. 1939".

== See also ==
- List of peace activists

== Selected writings ==
- Social Aspects of the Quaker Faith (London: Headley Brothers, 1899).
- Quakerism in England: Its Present Position (London: Headley Brothers, 1901).
- Authority and the Light Within (Philadelphia: J.C. Winston, 1908).
- The Silence of God (London: Headley Brothers, 1909).
- Notes on the Life and Teaching of Jesus (London: James Clark & Co.; Headley Brothers, 1910).
- The Personality of God and Other Essays in Constructive Christian Thought (London: Headley Brothers, 1911).
- The True Way Of Life (London: Headley Brothers, 1915).
- What is Quakerism?: An Exposition of the Leading Principles and Practices of the Society of Friends, as Based on the Experience of "the Inward Light" (London: Swarthmore, 1917).
- Christ in Christian thought: Notes on the Development of the Doctrine of Christ's Person (London: James Clark, 1919).
- The Bible; Its Nature and Inspiration (London: Swarthmore, 1920).
- The Meaning of the Cross: A Story of the Atonement (London: Allen and Unwin, 1922).
- Authority in Religion (New York: MacMillan, 1924).
- Quaker Thought and History: A Volume of Essays (New York: MacMillan, 1925).
- Christianity as Life (London: Swarthmore, 1927).
- The Nature of Christianity (London: Swarthmore, 1927).
- Christianity as Truth (London: Swarthmore, 1928).
- The Worth of Prayer: And Other Essays (London: James Clark, 1930).
- Thoughts on the Divine in Man (London: Friends Book Centre, 1931).

=== Translation other languages ===
- (in Hungarian) Edward Grubb: A quakerek vallása; ford. Molnár Nándor, sajtó alá rend., bev., jegyz. Czakó Ambró; Genius, Budapest, 1928 (Szabad Iskola 9.)
