= William Holdaway =

New Zealand cricketer

Personal information
- Full name: William Arthur Holdaway
- Born: 18 March 1893; Dunedin, Otago, New Zealand
- Died: 23 August 1967 (aged 74); Dunedin, Otago, New Zealand

Domestic team information
- Years: Team
- 1918/19: Otago
- Only FC: 18 March 1919 Otago v Southland
- Source: CricketArchive, 28 February 2024

William Arthur Holdaway (18 March 1893 – 23 August 1967) was a New Zealand cricketer. He played a single first-class match for Otago during the 1918–19 season.

Holdaway was born at Dunedin in 1893. He worked as a tinsmith. During World War I Holdaway served in the Otago Infantry Regiment. He saw active service on the Western Front in France during 1917 where he was gassed during the Battle of Passchendaele in October 1917, requiring hospital treatment. His condition did not improve and in March 1918 he was deemed unfit for service as a result of his wounds and returned to New Zealand where he was demobilised.

A club cricketer for the Grange club in Dunedin, Holdaway's "fine bowling" received praise from the Otago Daily Times as early as 1910. He made his only first-class appearance came against Southland in March 1919, scoring nine runs in the match.

At the start of World War II, Holdaway was working for Farra Brothers as a sheet metal worker. He was a member of the National Military Reserve and was called into the Territorial Force in 1941, although he was released from service the following year due to his occupation in an important wartime industry. He died at Dunedin in 1967 aged 74. His wife, Phoebe, died aged 82 in 1976.
