= Archibald Charles Barrington =

Archibald Charles Barrington (8 May 1906 – 4 March 1986) was a New Zealand clerk, secretary and pacifist. He was born in Wellington on 8 May 1906.

Along with Ormond Burton, he was one of the founders of the Christian Pacifist Society of New Zealand.

Wellington based, he was tried and convicted multiple times for anti-war activism during the second world war, spending a year in prison during which he kept an illicit diary.

After the war he moved to the Riverside Community in Moutere outside Motueka, where he "work[ed] actively to build a good society and a more peaceful world", farming, campaigning and rising in the ranks of the Methodist Church of New Zealand.

He died in Nelson on 4 March 1986.

== Works ==
- Trials of a pacifist. Christian Pacifist Society, 1970, 22 pages.
- The Prison Diary of A.C. Barrington. John Pratt (Ed.) 2016, ISBN 978 1 927322 31 4
