= Ormond Burton =

New Zealand pacifist (1893–1974)

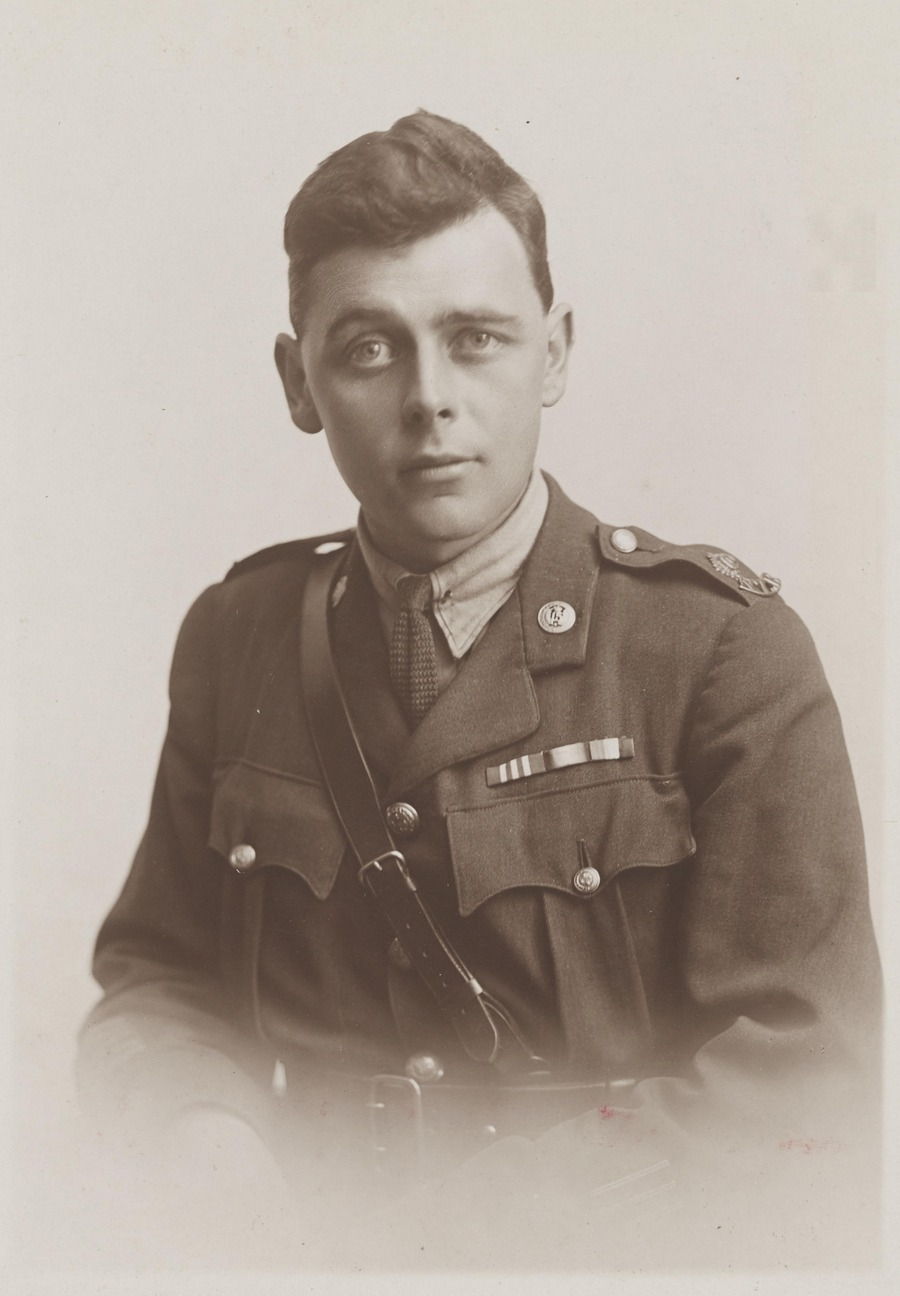
- Born: 16 January 1893; Auckland
- Died: 7 January 1974 (aged 80); Wellington
- Occupations: War historian, Soldier

Ormond Edward Burton (16 January 1893 – 7 January 1974) was a New Zealand teacher, soldier, war historian, Christian pacifist, Methodist clergyman, and writer, who was the co-founder (with Archibald Charles Barrington) of the Christian Pacifist Society of New Zealand.

== Life and career ==
=== Early years and war service ===
Born in Auckland, Burton excelled at school and was awarded a scholarship to Auckland Grammar School. When he left school he attended Auckland Training College to become a teacher. His first appointment was as sole teacher at Waimana Sawmill School in the Bay of Plenty in 1913.

Burton served in the First World War with the No 1 New Zealand Field Ambulance at Gallipoli and on the Western Front, then joined the infantry of the New Zealand Division. He was awarded the Military Medal for gallantry during a trench raid in 1917, and in 1918 was wounded for a third time and received the French Médaille d'honneur. At the end of the war he was asked to write the history of the New Zealand Division, and, after that was published, the history of the Auckland Infantry Regiment. He submitted the manuscript as an MA thesis at Auckland University College late in 1920 and it was published in 1922.

=== Pacifism ===
In the early 1920s, disillusioned by the terms of the Treaty of Versailles, which he believed had done nothing towards reconciliation and true peace, Burton became a resolute Christian pacifist. He was barred from teaching for a time for refusing to sign the oath of allegiance to the Crown, but was allowed to resume when a clause was added stating that the oath must not conflict with his duty to God. He resigned from his brief membership of the New Zealand Labour Party when it was clear he would be unable to exercise freedom of conscience within the party. He contested the Eden electorate in the 1928 election as an independent Christian Socialist and came a distant last of the four candidates.

Burton wrote a history of the New Zealand Division, which was published as The Silent Division in 1935. He was imprisoned several times for his opposition to the Second World War, and was expelled from the Methodist Church in 1942.
