= Hubert Holdaway =

New Zealand teacher, orchardist, Methodist lay preacher, pacifist, communitarian

Hubert Reginald Holdaway (18 January 1896 – 25 April 1963) was a New Zealand teacher, orchardist, Methodist lay preacher, pacifist and communitarian. He was born in Lower Moutere, Nelson, New Zealand on 18 January 1896.

Holdaway attended Nelson College from 1910 to 1912. He was one of the founders of the Riverside Community.
