= Herbert Cole =

English book illustrator and portrait artist

Herbert Cole (1867–1930) was an English book illustrator and portrait artist.

Cole was influenced by Walter Crane and Sir Edward Burne-Jones. He illustrated a range of books published by various notable publishers. He illustrated the John Lane edition of Gulliver's Travels in 1900.

== Personal life ==
Herbert Cole's wife was anti-war activist Clara Gilbert Cole.

== Background and influences ==
Herbert Cole (1867–1930), like Sylvia Pankhurst, studied at Manchester School of Art and was heavily influenced by the Pre-Raphaelites, William Morris and illustrators like Walter Crane who had volunteered their work for papers like the Socialist League's Commonweal. He married the anarchist and anti-militarist Clara Gilbert.

Both Clara and Herbert seem to have been involved in suffragism, Herbert becoming the staff artist for the Women's Social and Political Union (WSPU) later progressing to provide illustrations for 'The Workers' Dreadnought'. He was a prolific artist from the 1890s into the 1920s. His work included that as an illustrator for children's books and a designer.

== Work ==
- "A Child's Book of Warriors"
- "Animals drawn from memory"
- "Portrait of Clara Gilbert Cole" (artist's wife)
