= National Labour Press =

Karl Marx the Man and His Message a serialised article by Keir Hardie first published in the Labour Leader reprinted by the NLP as a book

The National Labour Press (NLP) was founded in 1909 to undertake printing for the Independent Labour Party (ILP). It published the Labour Leader as well as other ILP material. It was originally located at 30 Blackfriars Street.

In July 1915 Herbert Nield, Conservative MP for Ealing, raised in parliament his concerns about the activities of the Union of Democratic Control (UDC) and the ILP were holding "over 200 meetings weekly" and distributing literature. Following police raids, censorship was imposed on the Labour Leader, but the police in Manchester were cautious in seizing only sample copies of UDC literature. As it happened the Salford magistrates did not deem the material to be illegal. From March 1916 the NLP printed The Tribunal, a weekly newspaper, for the No Conscription Fellowship. The police raided the NLP and dismantled the press, but The Tribunal continued to be published via a secret press which the police had not found.

== Blackfriars Press ==
The Blackfriars Press Limited was formed as a subsidiary in Manchester in 1914 to undertake work. It moved to Leicester in 1922. Annie Maxton (the sister of James Maxton) and Emrys Hughes were both one time members of the management committee. The company was the first in the UK to print Nescafé labels. The contract was arranged following a chance meeting of the then managing director, W. M. Stafford. He met with a member of the Nestlé family whilst on a mountaineering holiday in Switzerland in the 1940s. The business was registered as a friendly society and in the early 1980s the ILP gave the business to its employees to trade as a co-operative. Lack of finance and bad debts caused the company to close in 1984.

== Archival resources ==
- Correspondence, minutes, papers and accounts are held by Glasgow City Archives, based in the Mitchell Library.
- Other material is kept in the ILP archive at the London School of Economics.
