= Catherine Marshall (suffragist) =

British suffragette, campaigner and social activist (1880–1961)

- Catherine Marshall in 1916. This may be the photograph used for permission to visit her love, Clifford Allen, in the military guardroom at Newhaven.
- Born: 29 April 1880; Harrow on the Hill, England
- Died: 22 March 1961 (aged 80)
- Education: St Leonards School
- Known for: suffragist and pacifist

Catherine Elizabeth Marshall (29 April 1880 – 22 March 1961) was a suffragist and campaigner against conscription during the First World War. She moved from women's votes to peace and worked in Geneva supporting the League of Nations.

== Early life and education ==
Marshall was born on 29 April 1880, in Harrow on the Hill. Her father, Francis Marshall, taught mathematics at Harrow School and her mother Caroline had also been a teacher. She was educated privately and then at St Leonards School in Scotland for three years.

Marshall inherited her interest in the Liberal Party although she would later become disillusioned that their values of equality did not include women. She joined the London Society for Women's Suffrage but she did not get involved. By 1908 her father had retired and they moved to the Lake District. Marshall's Uncle, the sociologist, T. H. Marshall, was interviewed by the historian, Brian Harrison, about Marshall in July 1978, and recalled the family home in Keswick with her parents and brother, Hal. Marshall and her mother joined the National Union of Women's Suffrage Societies (NUWSS) and created the Keswick branch. Marshall was demonstrating what became best practice by establishing a stall in Keswick market to sell suffrage literature and raise awareness. In 1911, she joined the core group at the heart of the NUWSS working with Kathleen Courtney who had been elected honorary secretary. Catherine led the press department and represented the group at a meeting in Stockholm. When Edith Palliser was ill she took over as parliamentary secretary skilfully inspiring local groups to lobby their M.P.s whilst she applied direct pressure to key figures. Palliser resigned and Marshall took on her role. The NUWSS was effectively led by Courtney and Marshall. Marshall was involved with senior Liberal party politicians who claimed to support women's suffrage but in effect did little. In August 1913, she returned to Keswick and stayed until the following February.

In February 1915, the Women's International Congress took place in The Hague. This was a conference she had helped organise. Marshall was convinced that peace could be established by recognising the consent of the people and refusing models built of force and power. In March 1915, she resigned from her positions with the NUWSS. She established her country's part of the Women's International League for Peace and Freedom.

left to right: Marshall, Sir George Paish, Jane Addams, Cornelia Ramondt-Hirschmann, Jeanne Melin – Emergency Peace Conference at the Hague "Conference for a New Peace" in 1922

She was an organiser for the No-Conscription Fellowship. She started a relationship with Clifford Allen, Chairman of the No-Conscription Fellowship, who was imprisoned as a conscientious objector three times. In 1917, he became so ill that he was released from prison and he and Marshall set up house together, Marshall was also ill, but from overwork. Marshall hoped that their relationship would continue, but Allen ended their partnership.

Marshall recovered from her overwork threw herself again into ensuring peace. She was a delegate in Zurich at the Women's International Congress. The congress attracted delegations from many of former countries who had been at war. The congress was able to review the model for the new League of Nations.

Following the formation of the League of Nations, Marshall spent a lot of time in Geneva working for the Women's International League for Peace and Freedom. This was an influential group and Jane Addams was to get a Nobel prize for her work with them. Marshall moved on in the 1930s to help people who were escaping from the growth of the Nazis in Germany.

== Posthumous recognition ==
Her papers are held at the National Library of Ireland.

Her name and picture (and those of 58 other women's suffrage supporters) are on the plinth of the statue of Millicent Fawcett in Parliament Square, London, unveiled in 2018.
