= Henry Sara =

English industrial unionist (1886–1953)

- Born: Henry Thomas William Sara; 24 August 1886; Islington, London, England
- Died: 19 November 1953 (aged 67)
- Spouse: Eleanor Pembrook (m. 1942)

Henry Thomas William Sara (24 August 1886 – 19 November 1953) was an English industrial unionist active as an anarchist, communist and Trotskyist.

== Biography ==
Sara was born into a working-class family: his father, John Sara, was a draper's assistant. Henry's first jobs included being a glass blower, a process block maker and a brewery engineer. He was an omnivorous reader, and had a particular interest in Darwinism and the novels of Eugene Sue. Although he was a secularist, he developed an interest in telepathy, spiritualism and theosophy.

He developed and presented lantern slide shows on such themes as "Russia Today", "war and struggle in Germany", "The Paris Commune", "Epochs of Social Change", "The French Revolution", "Ireland", "The Life and Work of Lenin" and "The Fraud of Spiritualism". More than 1,500 of the slides he used in his lectures are archived in the Modern Records Centre at the University of Warwick.

== Texts by Sara ==
- "Our policy stated" The Herald of Revolt, vol.III, no.4, May 1913
- "The two classes" The Spur, vol.1, no.9
- "They speak for themselves", "The Spur", vol.5, no.11, May 1919
