= Clifford Allen, 1st Baron Allen of Hurtwood =

British politician (1889–1939)

The Right Honourable The Lord Allen of Hurtwood

Chairman of the Independent Labour Party
- In office 1922–1926
- Preceded by: Richard Collingham Wallhead
- Succeeded by: James Maxton

Personal details
- Born: 9 May 1889 Newport, Wales
- Died: 3 March 1939 (aged 49) Switzerland
- Party: ILP; National Labour (from 1931)
- Spouse: Marjory Allen, Lady Allen of Hurtwood
- Education: Peterhouse, Cambridge

Reginald Clifford Allen, 1st Baron Allen of Hurtwood (9 May 1889 – 3 March 1939), known as Clifford Allen, was a British politician, leading member of the Independent Labour Party (ILP), and prominent pacifist.

== Early life and education ==
The son of Walter Allen, a draper, Reginald Clifford Allen was born in Newport, then in Monmouthshire in Wales. The family later moved to Bristol, on account of Walter's business. Allen was educated at Berkhamsted School, University College, Bristol and, from 1908 to 1911, at Peterhouse, Cambridge. Having initially identified as a Conservative, in his final year at Cambridge he was chair of the university's Fabian Society.

== Career ==
Shortly after coming down from Cambridge with a third-class degree, he was made Secretary and then General Manager of the Labour-supporting Daily Citizen between 1911 and 1915. He was Chairman of the No-Conscription Fellowship in the First World War, and was imprisoned as a conscientious objector three times. In 1917 he became so ill that he was released from prison where he set up house with Catherine Marshall who was also ill from overwork. Marshall hoped that their relationship would continue but Allen ended their partnership.

After the war he was Treasurer and Chairman of the Independent Labour Party between 1922 and 1926, Chairman of the New Leader between 1922 and 1926 and director of the Daily Herald between 1925 and 1930.

When the Labour Party split in 1931 Allen aligned with the minority who supported the creation of a National Government. Consequently, he was raised to the peerage as Baron Allen of Hurtwood, of Hurtwood in the County of Surrey, on 18 January 1932, to boost Prime Minister Ramsay MacDonald's National Labour representation in the House of Lords. In 1934 he co-founded the Next Five Years Group seeking a progressive centre-left re-alignment in British politics. Shunned by the Labour movement, many of the group's participants, such as Harold Macmillan, were radical conservatives; the result was the publication in July 1935 of The Next Five Years, which advocated a 'New Deal' for Britain but lacked any kind of institutional or political backing in order to become feasible.

Allen was opposed to the Versailles treaty and believed in the necessity of rehabilitating Germany for peace to be achieved. In late 1934 he joined the embryonic Anglo-German Fellowship and shortly thereafter, in January 1935, met Adolf Hitler in Germany. Allen wrote of Hitler:

I believe Herr Hitler's position in the country is unassailable. His sincerity is tremendous...I am convinced he genuinely desires peace...Germany's aggressive words and warlike phrases do not represent her intentions.

Despite his championing of the cause of appeasement, he strongly condemned Nazi brutality and anti-semitism. For instance, in the House of Lords in July 1938 he declared:

Germany has said that British democracy is degenerate. Well, I for one was never more proud of British democracy than when Professor Freud, that great scientist, aged and infirm, became an exile from his country and was welcomed within our shores. There was taken to him as an invalid the register of the Royal Society in order that he might inscribe his name therein, an act which I believe has never been carried through in this country except for members of our Royal Family; and thus degenerate democracy linked an exiled and distinguished Jewish scientist with members of our own Royal Family. That seemed to me a cause of pride, and not a sign of degeneracy.

His efforts to intercede with the German government trying to save Hans Litten, a prominent opponent of the Nazi regime, from Dachau concentration camp were however unsuccessful.

== Personal life ==
Clifford Allen married Marjory Gill on 17 December 1921. They had one child, a daughter born in 1922, Joan Collete, known as Polly. Never having fully recovered from the privations of his imprisonment during the First World War when he had contracted tuberculosis, Lord Allen of Hurtwood died in a sanatorium in Switzerland in 1939, aged 49, the peerage becoming extinct.

== Publications ==
- Is Germany right and Britain wrong?, Chelsea : London : s.n., 1914.
- Executive committee report to the members on the progress of the fellowship, No-Conscription Fellowship. London : No-Conscription Fellowship, 1915.
- Presidential address by Clifford Allen to the National Convention of the No-Conscription Fellowship, 27 November 1915, No-Conscription Fellowship. London : National Labour Press, 1916.
- Why I still resist: Leaflet (No-Conscription Fellowship), no. 5., No-Conscription Fellowship, Pelican Press, London : Printed for the No-Conscription Fellowship, 1917.
- Putting socialism into practice : the President address, London : Independent Labour Party, 1924.
- The I.L.P. and Revolution ... Reprinted from the Socialist Review., London : I.L.P. Publication Dept., 1925.
- Socialism & the next Labour Government. The presidential address ... at the I.L.P. Annual Conference, 1925., Independent Labour Party: London, 1925.
- Labour's Future at Stake, London : G. Allen & Unwin, 1932.
- Britain's political future; a plea for liberty and leadership, London, New York [etc.] Longmans, Green, 1934.
- Effective pacifism, London : League of Nations Union, 1934.
- The next five years : an essay in political agreement, with W Arnold Forster; A Barratt Brown; et al. London : Macmillan, 1935.
- We did not fight : 1914-18 experiences of war resisters, edited by Julian Bell; with a foreword by H.R.L. Sheppard; contrib. by Lord Allen of Hurtwood ... [et al.]. London, 1935.
- Peace in Our Time. An appeal to the International Peace Conference of June 16, 1936. London : Chatto & Windus, 1936.
- The price of European peace, with Frank Ongley Darvall; Jan Christiaan Smuts. London [u.a.] : Hodge, 1937.

Party political offices
Preceded by Herbert Witard	London Division representative on the Independent Labour Party National Administrative Council; 1920–1921	Succeeded by Ernest E. Hunter
Preceded by Richard Collingham Wallhead	Chairman of the Independent Labour Party; 1922–1926	Succeeded by James Maxton
Peerage of the United Kingdom
New creation	Baron Allen of Hurtwood; 1932–1939	Extinct
