= No-Conscription Fellowship =

British pacifist organisation

The National Committee in 1916. front row (L to R): C.H. Norman, Alfred Salter, Aylmer Rose, Fenner Brockway, Clifford Allen, Edward Grubb, Will Chamberlain, Catherine Marshall. back row (L to R): Rev. Leyton Richards, Morgan Jones, John P. Fletcher, Alfred Barratt Brown and Bertrand Russell.

The Tribunal was the journal of the NCF. The authorities tried to suppress this during the war by following the staff and smashing the presses. Secrecy was maintained and publication continued.

The No-Conscription Fellowship was a British pacifist organisation which was founded in London by Fenner Brockway and Clifford Allen on 27 November 1914, following a suggestion by Lilla Brockway, after the First World War had failed to reach an early conclusion. Other prominent supporters included John Clifford, Bruce Glasier, Hope Squire, Bertrand Russell, Robert Smillie and Philip Snowden.

== Background ==
A focus of the campaign was the Military Service Act which introduced conscription in 1916. Branches were established across the country, leaflets were produced and deputations sent to lobby Parliament. They were successful in getting provision for conscientious objectors in the bill, but opposed the establishment of the army's Non-Combatant Corps.

== History ==
The founders and other members were jailed for their opposition to conscription. Bertrand Russell took over from Clifford Allen as the chairman of the organisation while Catherine Marshall took over from Fenner Brockway as secretary. Marshall was in love with Clifford Allen and, when he was suffering from the effects of imprisonment, she drove herself to the point of exhaustion and Lilla Brockway then resumed the role of secretary in 1917, as she had been provisional secretary in 1916. The National Committee in 1916 was A. Barratt Brown, Alfred Salter, Aylmer Rose, Bertrand Russell, C.H. Norman, Catherine Marshall, Clifford Allen, Edward Grubb, Fenner Brockway, John P. Fletcher, Morgan Jones, Rev. Leyton Richards, Will Chamberlain.

The Scottish organisation was led by Marjory Newbold, whose husband Walton became a Communist MP.

Branches were established across the country and the first national convention was held on 27 November 1915 at the Congregational Memorial Hall. The second convention was held the following year on 8 April at Devonshire House — a Quaker meeting place in Bishopsgate. Beatrice Webb, who was pro-war, recorded the occasion in her diary,

The Friends' Meeting House ... was packed with some 2,000 young men — the National Convention of the No-Conscription Fellowship. ... Among the 2,000 were many diverse types. The intellectual pietist, slender in figure, delicate in feature and complexion, benevolent in expression was the dominant type. These youths were saliently conscious of their own righteousness. ... On the platform were the sympathisers with the movement — exactly the sort of persons you would expect to find at such a meeting — older pacifists and older rebels — Bertrand Russell, Robert Trevelyan, George Lansbury, Olive Schreiner, Lupton, Stephen and Rosa Hobhouse, Dr Clifford, C.H. Norman, Miss Llewelyn Davies and the Snowdens: the pacifist predominating over the rebel element.

From March 1916 the NCF published The Tribunal. In an effort to suppress this publication, the police raided the National Labour Press and dismantled the printing press. However the NCF had a secret press and were able to continue publishing.

Historian Thomas Kennedy says that during the last two years of the war, the NCF remained a:

minor but troublesome irritant to the authorities, using its surprisingly resilient propaganda machinery to expose brutal or illegal treatment of conscientious objectors as well as to agitate, especially among the industrial working classes, an end to the conflict.

== See also ==
- List of anti-war organizations
