= NDN =

NDN can mean:

- NDN (gene), a gene found on chromosome 15 in humans and chromosome 7 in mice
- Named data networking, a NSF-funded future internet architecture research project
- New Democrat Network, an American think tank that promoted centrist Democratic candidates
- Nigel Desmond Norman (1929–2002), British aircraft designer, his company NDN Aircraft, and their products:
  - NDN Firecracker, a single-engine aircraft designed as a military trainer
  - NDN Fieldmaster, a British agricultural aircraft of the 1980s
- Shorthand spelling for Indian, a term that some Native Americans in the United States and some First Nations peoples in Canada use to refer to themselves
- Necromancer's DOS Navigator, an orthodox file manager for DOS
- Northern Distribution Network, part of NATO logistics in the Afghan War
- Neodymium nitride, a chemical with the symbol NdN.
