= Jesse Norman =

British politician (born 1962)

The Right Honourable Jesse Norman MP
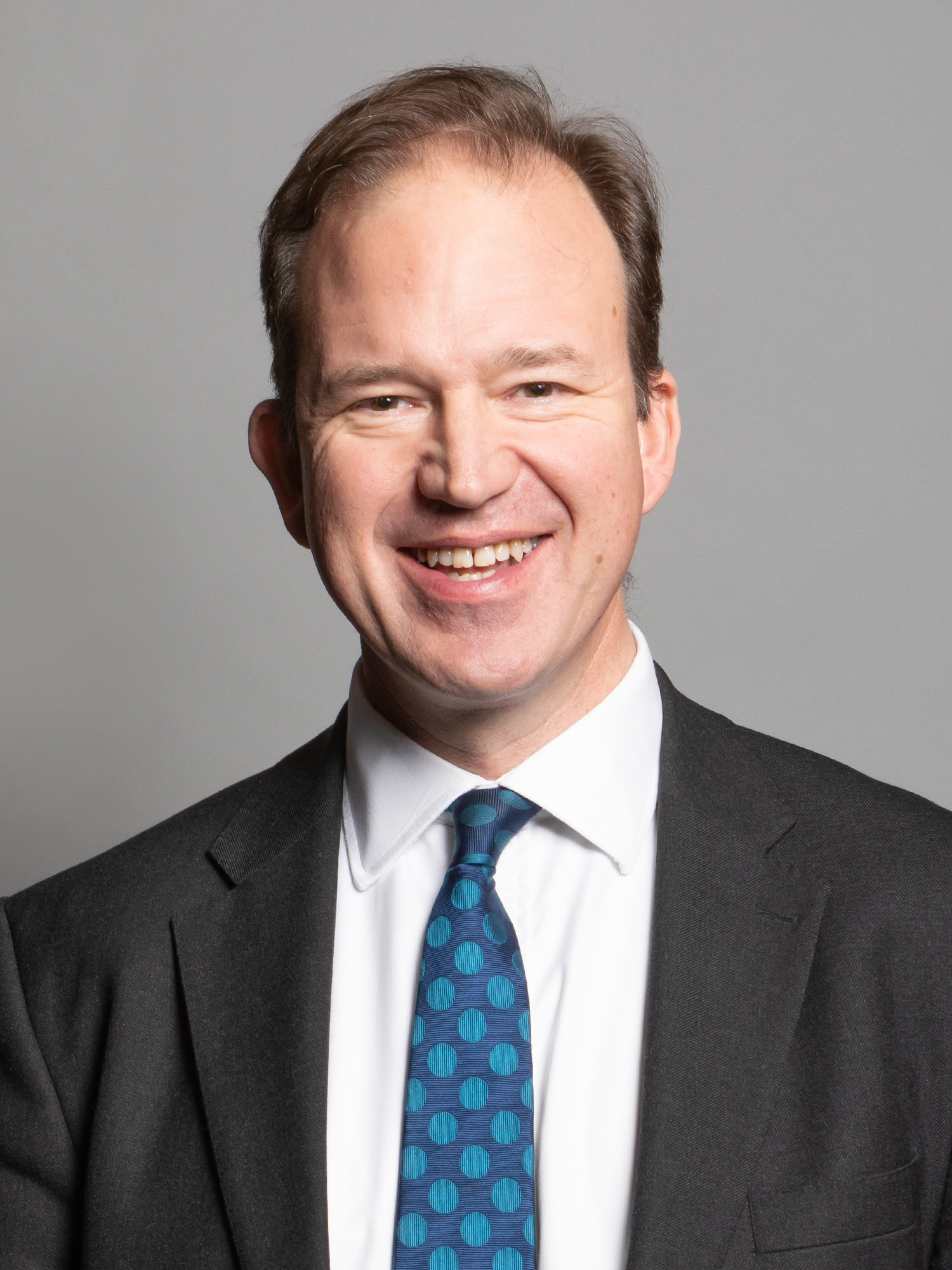
- Official portrait, 2020

Shadow Leader of the House of Commons
- Incumbent
- Assumed office 5 November 2024
- Deputy: John Lamont (since 2025)
- Leader: Kemi Badenoch
- Preceded by: Chris Philp

Minister of State for Decarbonisation and Technology (Note: Minister of State for Transport (2018–19))
- In office 26 October 2022 – 13 November 2023
- Prime Minister: Rishi Sunak
- Preceded by: Lucy Frazer
- Succeeded by: Anthony Browne
- In office 12 November 2018 – 23 May 2019
- Prime Minister: Theresa May
- Preceded by: Jo Johnson
- Succeeded by: Michael Ellis

Minister of State for the Americas and the Overseas Territories
- In office 7 September 2022 – 26 October 2022
- Prime Minister: Liz Truss
- Preceded by: Rehman Chishti
- Succeeded by: David Rutley

Financial Secretary to the Treasury
- In office 23 May 2019 – 16 September 2021
- Prime Minister: Theresa May; Boris Johnson
- Preceded by: Mel Stride
- Succeeded by: Lucy Frazer

Paymaster General
- In office 23 May 2019 – 24 July 2019
- Prime Minister: Theresa May
- Preceded by: Mel Stride
- Succeeded by: Oliver Dowden

Parliamentary Under-Secretary of State for Transport
- In office 15 June 2017 – 12 November 2018
- Prime Minister: Theresa May
- Preceded by: Andrew Jones
- Succeeded by: Andrew Jones

Parliamentary Under-Secretary of State for Industry and Energy
- In office 18 July 2016 – 14 June 2017
- Prime Minister: Theresa May
- Preceded by: Office established
- Succeeded by: Richard Harrington

Chair of the Culture, Media and Sport Committee
- In office 18 June 2015 – 18 July 2016
- Preceded by: John Whittingdale
- Succeeded by: Damian Collins

Member of Parliament for Hereford and South Herefordshire
- Incumbent
- Assumed office 6 May 2010
- Preceded by: Paul Keetch
- Majority: 1,279 (1.8%)

Personal details
- Born: Alexander Jesse Norman; 23 June 1962 (age 64) London, England
- Party: Conservative
- Spouse: Catherine Bingham (m. 1992)
- Relations: Sir Mark Norman, Bt (uncle); Sir Torquil Norman (father)
- Children: 3
- Education: Eton College
- Alma mater: Merton College, Oxford (BA); University College London (MPhil, PhD)
- Website: jessenorman.com

Academic background
- Thesis: Visual reasoning in Euclid's geometry : an epistemology of diagrams (2003)

Alexander Jesse Norman (born 23 June 1962) is a British politician, author and philosopher who has served as Shadow Leader of the House of Commons since November 2024. A member of the Conservative Party, he has been a Member of Parliament (MP) for Hereford and South Herefordshire since 2010.

Norman was a director at Barclays before leaving the City in 1997 to research and teach at University College London. Prior to that he ran an educational charity in Eastern Europe during and after the Communist era.

Between 2016 and 2023, he held several ministerial positions, including Paymaster General and Financial Secretary to the Treasury. Upon Kemi Badenoch's victory in the 2024 Conservative Party leadership election, Norman was appointed Shadow Leader of the House of Commons, replacing Chris Philp.

== Early life and education ==
Jesse Norman was born on 23 June 1962 in London. He is the son of Sir Torquil Norman and his wife Lady Elizabeth Montagu (daughter of the 10th Earl of Sandwich), the paternal grandson of Air Commodore Sir Nigel Norman, 2nd Bt, CBE, and the great-grandson of Sir Henry Norman, 1st Bt. He and his sons are therefore in remainder to the Norman baronetcy.

Norman was educated at Eton College and Merton College, Oxford, graduating with a second-class honours degree in Classics.

== Career ==
=== Academic ===
Norman pursued further studies at University College London, where he was appointed an Honorary Research Fellow in philosophy, receiving a Master of Philosophy (MPhil) in 1999 and a Doctor of Philosophy (PhD) in 2003. His doctoral thesis was titled "Visual reasoning in Euclid's geometry: an epistemology of diagrams". He also lectured in philosophy at University College London and Birkbeck, University of London. He was elected as a visiting fellow at All Souls College, Oxford in 2016–17, and a Two-Year Fellow in 2022.

Norman's research interests include Edmund Burke and Adam Smith.

=== Charity ===
He was for many years a trustee of The Roundhouse, a North London arts venue and charity founded by his father, Sir Torquil Norman. He has also served on the board of the Hay Festival, the Kindle Centre in Hereford, and the Friends of St Mary's church, Ross-on-Wye.

=== Think tanks and writing ===
He was a Senior Fellow at Policy Exchange and writes regularly for the national press. His book Compassionate Conservatism (2006), co-written with Janan Ganesh, has been described as "the guidebook to Cameronism" by The Sunday Times. Its successor, Compassionate Economics, was favourably reviewed by Daniel Hannan. His other policy publications include "Living for the City" (2006) and "From Here to Fraternity" (2007).

His books include The Achievement of Michael Oakeshott (ed.) (1992), Breaking the Habits of a Lifetime (1992) and After Euclid (2006); The Big Society: The Anatomy of the New Politics (2010), published by University of Buckingham Press.

His biography of Edmund Burke was long-listed for the 2013 Samuel Johnson Prize for Non-Fiction, and was described as "A must-read for anyone interested in politics and history" by the Sunday Telegraph.

His book Adam Smith: What He Thought, and Why It Matters (2018), won the Parliamentary non-fiction book award in 2018., and was described as "superb" in the Financial Times.

Norman's first novel, The Winding Stair, about the rivalry between Francis Bacon and Edward Coke, was published in June 2023.

=== Political ===
At the 2006 local elections in Camden, Norman was one of the three Conservative candidates for Camden Town with Primrose Hill ward. However, he was unsuccessful, in what was a close contest between the Labour and Liberal Democrat parties.

== Parliamentary career ==
At the 2010 general election, Norman was elected to Parliament as MP for Hereford and South Herefordshire with 46.2% of the vote and a majority of 2,481.

He was a member of the Treasury Select Committee from July 2010 to March 2015, was Chairman of the All-Party Parliamentary Group on Employee Ownership, founder of the PFI Rebate Campaign and founding member of the Campaign for an Effective Second Chamber which campaigns for the House of Lords to be appointed rather than elected.

On 10 July 2012, Norman was reported to be the organiser ringleader of the rebellion over the House of Lords Reform package presented to the House of Commons. Ed Miliband, the then leader of the Labour Party, described the scene involving Cameron and Norman as "fisticuffs in the Lobby" at Prime Minister's Questions.

In 2013, Norman said that so many Old Etonians were in government positions because of Eton's "ethos" of public service that "other schools don't imbue the same commitment". Later on Twitter, Norman said his comments were "defending one institution, not attacking others". Norman describes his educational background as following "an educational argument between my mother, who despised any form of privilege, and my father, who took the view that he had set up his own business, so he was entitled to spend money on his kids' education".

Norman was dismissed from Downing Street's Policy Board in September 2013 after rebelling against the Government again in opposition to military intervention in Syria.

On 27 June 2014, prior to the nomination of Jean-Claude Juncker to the presidency of the European Commission, Norman gave his wholehearted support of Cameron's stance, as being "absolutely right... in opposing Mr Juncker". He argued that the EU constitution requires elected heads to choose its "President" and secondly that Juncker's manifesto fails to tackle what he (Norman) sees as the President's duty to address the unpopularity of EU mandates. Norman also said that democracy, for the British, involves legitimacy derived from the ballot box, whereas for some Europeans, it involves centralised bureaucracy.

In September 2014, Norman raised the issue of rules concerning football club ownership in the House of Commons, alleging the then-Chairman of Hereford United had a criminal conviction, in support of Supporters Trust's campaign to oust the Agombar régime at Hereford Utd FC. On 19 December 2014, the club was wound up in the High Court.

At the 2015 general election, Norman was re-elected as MP for Hereford and South Herefordshire with an increased vote share of 52.6% and an increased majority of 16,890.

=== Chairman of the Culture, Media and Sport Committee ===
On 19 June 2015, he was elected as Chairman of the Culture, Media and Sport Committee.

On 8 September 2015 at a hearing of the Culture, Media and Sport Select Committee convened to discuss recent allegation of blood doping in athletics, Norman said the following "When you hear the London Marathon, potentially the winners or medallists at the London Marathon, potentially British athletes are under suspicion for very high levels of blood doping... " thus seemingly using parliamentary privilege to implicate Paula Radcliffe as being involved, since she is the only British London Marathon winner since 1996. This prompted Radcliffe to respond with a statement denying any involvement in doping, though Norman said it was not his intention to implicate any individual.

=== Ministerial career ===
Following Theresa May's appointment as prime minister in July 2016, Norman was appointed Parliamentary Under-Secretary of State for Industry and Energy.

Norman was again re-elected at the snap 2017 general election, with an increased vote share of 53.5% and a decreased majority of 15,013.

Norman was appointed Parliamentary Under-Secretary of State for Transport after the 2017 general election, before advancing to Minister of State at the same department in November 2018.

In May 2019, Norman was appointed Paymaster General and Financial Secretary to the Treasury by Theresa May; he remained in the latter position under her successor, Boris Johnson, until he stepped down in September 2021. During his time at the Treasury, he managed the UK Pandemic Furlough and self-employed schemes, launched a 10 year strategy to digitize the tax system, and set up the UK Infrastructure Bank. At the time of stepping down, he was said to have done so over Boris Johnson's bid for more diversity in Government.

At the 2019 general election, Norman was again re-elected, with an increased vote share of 61.2% and an increased majority of 19,686.

On 6 June 2022, Norman sent his letter of no confidence to Boris Johnson, in reaction to the Partygate scandal and policy propositions that Norman opposed, such as Johnson's Rwanda plan and the privatisation of Channel 4. He also denounced the sidelining of Parliament by Johnson's Government, accusing him of "trying to import elements of a presidential system of government that is entirely foreign to our constitution". After Johnson's resignation a month later, Norman backed Nadhim Zahawi in the July–September 2022 Conservative Party leadership election. After Zahawi was eliminated, he backed Liz Truss for the leadership.

In September 2022 he returned to Government as Minister of State for the Americas and the Overseas Territories, appointed by Liz Truss following her election as Leader of the Conservative Party and prime minister.

In October 2022 he moved to the Department for Transport, having been appointed by the new PM Rishi Sunak (who he had backed in the October 2022 Conservative Party leadership election) to the role of Minister of State for Decarbonisation and Technology from October 2022 to November 2023.

On 13 November 2023 he stood down from his Ministerial role citing that it would enable him to spend more time campaigning locally, and saying that he had indicated his wish to step down to the whips some months previously.

=== In opposition ===
At the 2024 general election, Norman was again re-elected, with a decreased vote share of 32.6% and a decreased majority of 1,279.

In July 2024, he announced his backing of Kemi Badenoch in the 2024 Conservative Party leadership election, stating that she could "draw the best from the past but galvanise fresh energies and set a new direction". Upon Badenoch's victory in the 2024 leadership election, Norman was appointed Shadow Leader of the House of Commons.

In January 2025, Norman was appointed Chair of NMITE. On his appointment, he said: "This is a huge honour. NMITE is already showing that it can educate students at different life stages in hands-on engineering and technology to Bachelors and Masters level faster and more cost-effectively than any other university in the UK."

== Political positions ==
Norman has been described as a member of the Conservative Party's One-Nation wing and one of the main intellectuals of Cameronism. Norman is a supporter of the Big Society, viewing it as an example of Burkean Conservativism. Norman argues that the Big Society is "a focus on human beings not as economic atoms, but as bundles of capability; a focus on intermediate institutions between the individual and the state; and a focus on society and individual rights as such, rather than as mediated by the state". He is critical of liberal individualism, putting forth the idea that conservativism should be focused on human responsibility and that social orders should be preserved to address the needs of the "generations past, present and future".

Almost alone among MPs, Norman has never revealed publicly how he voted over the UK's continued membership of the European Union in the 2016 referendum saying only, "A referendum is not an act of representative government and I am not a minister, so my vote can properly be a private one." He set out his view of Brexit in an op-ed "To get this EU debate out of the sewer, it needs the Pulp Fiction treatment".

== Personal life ==
In 1992, Norman married Catherine Bingham, only daughter of The Lord Bingham of Cornhill, KG, the former Lord Chief Justice. Bingham is known for leading the Johnson government's COVID-19 Vaccine Taskforce. They have two sons and one daughter.

In November 2019, he was appointed as a member of the Privy Council.

He was elected a Fellow of the Royal Historical Society in November 2020.

== Works ==
- The Achievement of Michael Oakeshott (editor) (Gerald Duckworth & Co, 1993) ISBN 0715624512
- Breaking the Habits of a Lifetime: Poland's First Steps Toward the Market (editor) (Ipswich Press, 1994) ISBN 0938864173
- After Euclid: Visual Reasoning and the Epistemology of Diagrams (The Center for the Study of Language and Information Publications, 2006) ISBN 9781575865096
- Compassionate Conservatism (with Janan Ganesh) (University of Buckingham Press, 2008) ISBN 978-0955190933
- The Big Society: The Anatomy of the New Politics (University of Buckingham Press, 2010) ISBN 0956395201
- Edmund Burke: The Visionary Who Invented Modern Politics (Harpercollins, 2014) ISBN 978-0007489640
- Adam Smith: What He Thought, and Why it Matters (Allen Lane, 2018) ISBN 978-0241328491
- The Winding Stair (London: Biteback Publishing, 2023) ISBN 9781785907920

== Notes ==
Parliament of the United Kingdom
Preceded by Paul Keetch	Member of Parliament for Hereford and South Herefordshire; 2010–present	Incumbent
Political offices
Office established	Parliamentary Under-Secretary of State for Business, Energy and Industrial Strategy; 2016–2017	Succeeded by Richard Harrington
Preceded by Andrew Jones	Parliamentary Under-Secretary of State for Transport; 2017–2018	Succeeded by Andrew Jones
Preceded by Jo Johnson	Minister of State for Transport; 2018–2019	Succeeded by Michael Ellis
Preceded by Mel Stride	Paymaster General; 2019	Succeeded by Oliver Dowden
Preceded by Mel Stride	Financial Secretary to the Treasury; 2019–2021	Succeeded by Lucy Frazer
