= Cushioncraft =

British hovercraft manufacturer

Cushioncraft Ltd was a British engineering company, formed in 1960 as a division of Britten-Norman Ltd (manufacturer of aircraft) to develop/build hovercraft. Originally based at Bembridge Airport on the Isle of Wight, Cushioncraft later moved to the Duver Works at St. Helens. These works gave ready access to the sheltered water of Bembridge Harbour.

== History ==
In 1960 Britten-Norman Ltd began trials of their new "Cushioncraft"—their name for an air-cushion vehicle built for Elders and Fyffes. It was used to study the potential of this type of vehicle for the carriage of bananas from plantations in the Southern Cameroons. Together with its associated company, Crop Culture (Aerial) Ltd, Britten-Norman studied the potential for the Cushioncraft in many different countries. These investigations revealed the possibility of a break-through in transportation techniques by the use of air cushion vehicles which could accelerate the pace of development in territories where roads are nonexistent and costly to build and rivers are seasonally unnavigable.

Cushioncraft was reconstituted as a separate company in 1967 to permit British Hovercraft Corporation (BHC) to take a minority share holding, and it revived the name under which Britten-Norman's initial ACV endeavours were launched. Cushioncraft has an authorised capital of £500,000 and issued capital of £450,000, BHC paid Britten-Norman £90,000 for a 20 percent stake in the company's hovercraft activities. The board of Cushioncraft comprised Messrs F. R. J. Britten, Desmond Norman, J. M. McMahon and F. H. Mann (all directors of Britten-Norman), Peter Winter (technical director), and A. R. B. Hobbs, BHC's nominee.

In 1971, Britten-Norman encountered financial problems, and one result was that the Cushioncraft company was sold in 1972 to the British Hovercraft Corporation.

== Production ==
Between 1960 and 1972 Cushioncraft designed six models of which five were produced.

=== CC1 ===
CC1 was the "second" hovercraft to lift off in 1960. Circular (18 ft 10 in). The lift rotor—driven by 170 bhp 2-litre Coventry Climax FPF engine—ran round the periphery of the hull (a plywood construction); the engine also drove two propellers (taken from a Hiller helicopter) to steer through differential pitch. The cab, at the front of the hull, had space for the pilot and two passengers.The ground clearance of the CC1 was 12 to 15 inch.

=== CC2 ===
The 11 passenger CC2 was originally designed without a skirt and using air deflection within the cushion for propulsion. The CC2 was heavily developed over the years with the addition of a skirt and two external engines each driving a propeller for propulsion. The "bodywork" was also heavily modified.

=== CC4 ===
The CC4 was developed by Cushioncraft jointly with Hovercraft Development (created as a subsidiary of the National Research Development Corporation that employed Cockerell). It was intended to be the first car sized craft to be put into production; this never happened. Subsequent to development use by Cushioncraft, the CC4 was sold to the National Physical Laboratory for future research, HDL renamed it HU-4.

=== CC5 ===
One 6/8 seater CC5 was built, during tests off Priory Bay (Isle of Wight) it capsized and was written off in October 1966.

=== CC6 ===
The CC6 concept hovercraft was designed circa 1966. This was to be a small vehicle/passenger craft (4 to 6 cars and 30 to 40 passengers) using the quiet centrifugal fan configuration for lift and propulsion developed from the CC4 and CC5. The Cushioncraft CC-6 18-ton mixed-traffic ferry craft was to be built jointly by the Vosper Thorneycroft shipbuilding group at Portsmouth. This was the effect of an agreement between Vosper and Cushioncraft, under which Vosper were to be major sub-contractors in the construction of the craft. Development was to be financed jointly by Cushioncraft and the National Research Development Corporation (NRDC). Cushioncraft's facilities at St Helen's, IoW, were considered inadequate for CC-6 production.

=== CC7 ===
The CC7 was a development of the CC5, built in aluminium with inflatable side decks—the first Cushioncraft to use a gas turbine engine (all previous being piston). A stretched version offering 17 passenger places was proposed after the company was taken over by BHC. One of the remaining CC7 hovercraft is on display at The Hovercraft Museum, Lee-on-the-Solent.

The CC7 was 24 ft 4 in (7.42 m) long with a beam of 15 ft 2 in (4.62 m) beam inflated, (Note: when sidebodies deflated, beam is 7 ft 6 in (2.29 m)) and 7 ft 8 in (2.34 m) high. It would fit in a standard air-freighting crate 30 ft X 8 ft X 8 ft in size.

The lift and thrust engine was a United Aircraft of Canada ST-6B60DK marine gas turbine (a modified Pratt & Whitney Canada ST6) developing 390 bhp (290 kW) at 6,000 rpm. It could achieve a maximum of 50 knots and climb a 1 in 6 gradient. The endurance was 2 hours.

- Accommodation Seats for two crew and six passengers plus two extra folding seats for passengers in doorways.
- Weights Empty 2,880 lb; payload 2,120 lb; all-up weight 5,000 lb.

== Later years ==
After Cushioncraft was taken over by BHC, the "unique" fan lift/propulsion arrangement design of the later quiet Cushioncraft vehicles was discontinued.

The Duver Works has since been used by Hovertravel/Hoverwork as a maintenance centre and in the 1980s/90s was used to fit out the AP1-88 craft.
