= NAC Freelance =

NAC-1 (BN-3) Freelance
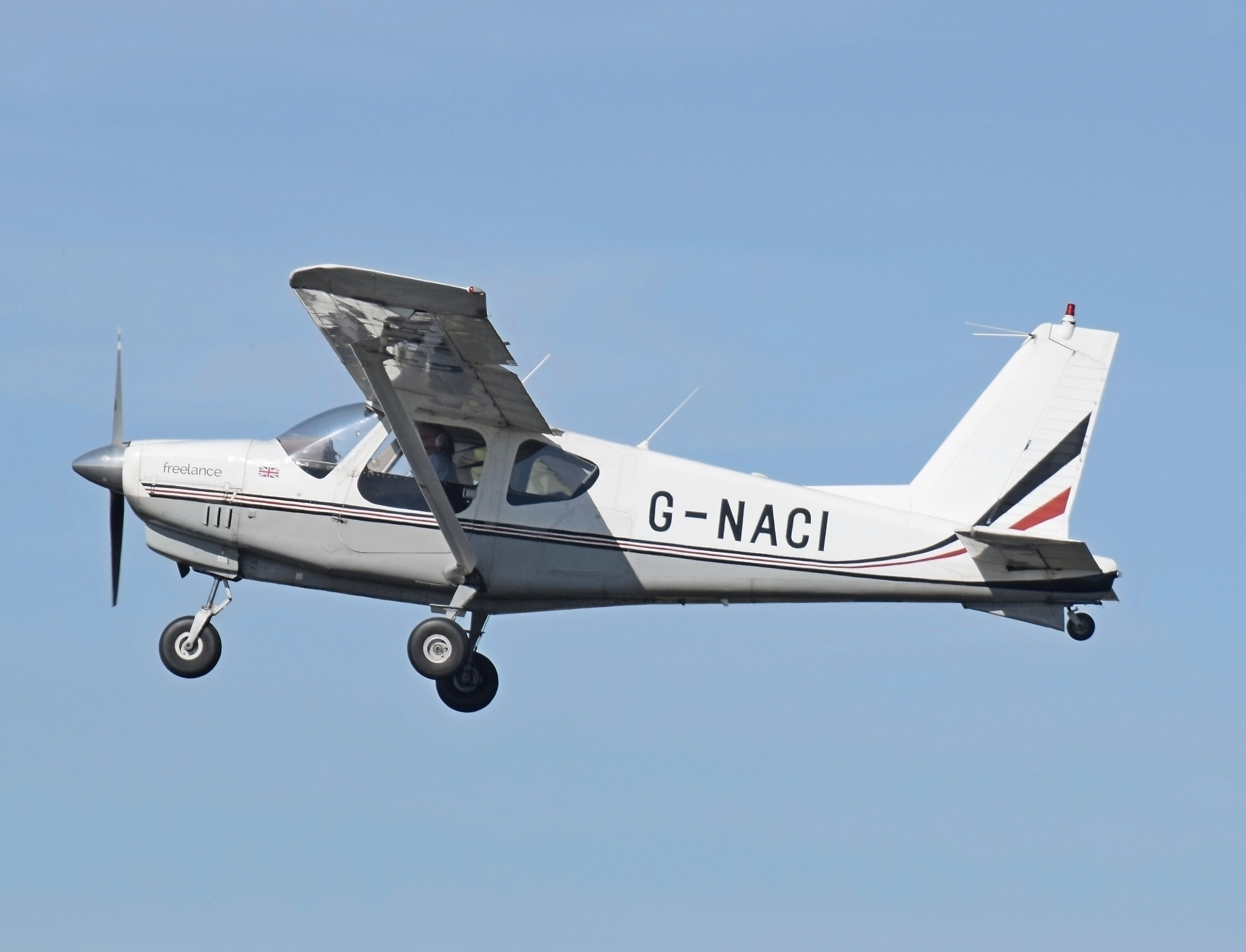
- Norman NAC-1 Freelance at Cotswold Airport, England, in 2018

General information
- Type: Four-seat monoplane
- National origin: United Kingdom
- Manufacturer: Britten-Norman; NDN Aircraft; Norman Aircraft Company
- Designer: Desmond Norman
- Status: Operational in 2003, now stored
- Number built: 2

History
- First flight: 17 May 1969 (BN-3); 29 September 1984 (NAC-1)

The NAC-1 Freelance, originally the BN-3 Nymph, is a British four-seat touring monoplane.

== Development ==
Designed by Desmond Norman when with Britten-Norman, the BN-3 Nymph was an all-metal high-wing braced monoplane powered by a 115 hp Lycoming O-235 engine. It was designed to allow it to be assembled in under-developed countries which would build the aircraft under a technology transfer scheme.

With the demise of the original Britten-Norman company, Norman took the design with him to his new company NDN Aircraft. NDN planned to build and sell the Nymph with a lengthened cabin as the NAC-1 Freelance. The Nymph was reworked as the prototype Freelance and first flew in that configuration on 29 September 1984. In 1985 NDN Aircraft was renamed the Norman Aircraft Company (NAC) and components and fuselage sections for six aircraft were built. Following the failure of the company to win a military order with the NDN Firecracker military trainer the company was closed down.

== Specifications (BN-3) ==
Data from Jane's All The World's Aircraft 1969–70

General characteristics

- Crew: 1
- Capacity: 3 passengers
- Length: 23 ft 7 in (7.20 m)
- Wingspan: 39 ft 4 in (11.98 m)
- Height: 9 ft 6 in (2.90 m)
- Wing area: 169.0 sq ft (15.70 m^{2})
- Aspect ratio: 9.1:1
- Airfoil: NACA 23012
- Empty weight: 1,140 lb (517 kg)
- Max takeoff weight: 1,925 lb (873 kg)
- Powerplant: 1 × Lycoming O-235-C1B air-cooled flat-four, 115 hp (86 kW)
- Propellers: 2-bladed Sensenich, 6 ft 2 in (1.88 m) diameter

Performance

- Maximum speed: 117 mph (188 km/h, 102 kn) at sea level
- Cruise speed: 113 mph (182 km/h, 98 kn) at 7,500 ft (2,300 m)
- Range: 600 mi (970 km, 520 nmi)
- Service ceiling: 11,200 ft (3,400 m)
- Rate of climb: 600 ft/min (3.0 m/s)
- Take-off run to 50 ft (15 m): 1,550 ft (470 m)
- Landing run from 50 ft (15 m): 920 ft (280 m)
