= GECI SK-105 Skylander =

Skylander SK-105
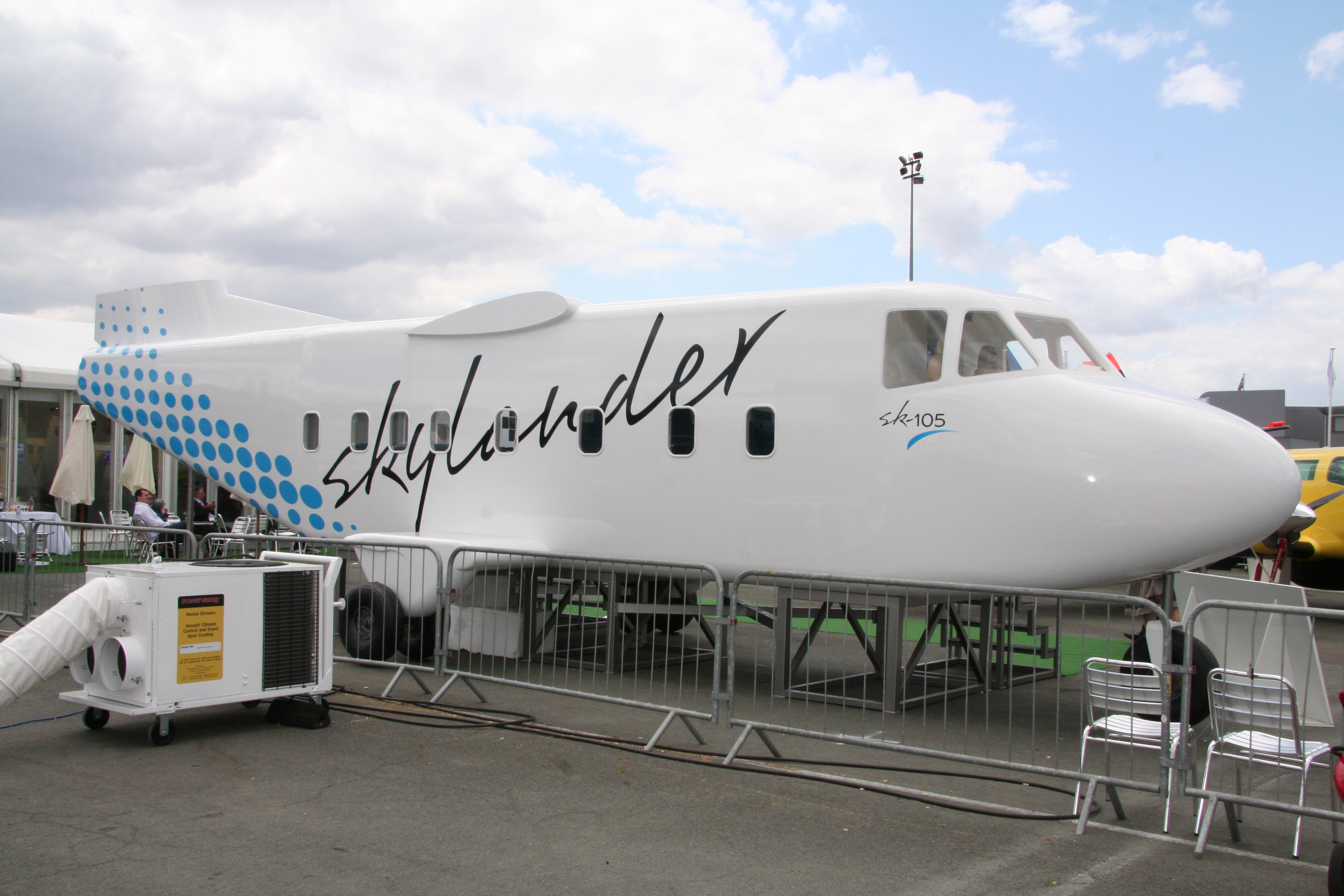
- Obsolete Skylander mockup at Paris Air Show 2009

General information
- Type: Airliner
- National origin: France
- Manufacturer: GECI Aviation
- Status: Canceled

The Skylander SK-105 was a project for a new twin-turboprop light aircraft, developed by Sky Aircraft, a subsidiary of GECI Aviation. The Skylander SK-105 was projected to enter service in late 2014. However, in July 2012, no prototype was even built. The project was stopped by the dissolution of the company, announced on 16 April 2013.

== Design and development ==
The first reference to this project is known to be 1988 and the aircraft was called SB 100C 1 2 3. The project was announced on 17 October 2001 at the Seoul Air Show. Design supervision was by the late Desmond Norman, co-designer of the Britten-Norman Islander. The first metal cut was scheduled for January 2004; the first of two prototypes were expected to fly in May 2005, but this has been postponed indefinitely, pending adequate funding.

By December 2007, plans were in hand for the formal programme launch in April 2008, following the signature of letter of intent by Turkish freight carrier ACT Airlines Group for 15 aircraft to be delivered between 2011 and 2021. Simultaneously, there was an announced partnership agreement for distribution of the Skylander in Bulgaria, Hungary, Macedonia, Turkey and several Middle East countries. Progress was slowed by a change of manufacturing plant from Portugal to France during 2008, and the target in-service date remained 2011. The programme was structured for joint funding (initially US$120 million) by three risk-sharing partners, Korean Aerospace Industries being first, on 17 October 2001, to pledge US$30 million to secure responsibility for wing production.

In October 2009, a new design of the aircraft was presented. After another change of manufacturing plant location (Chambley-Bussières Air Base in Lorraine), the target date of entry into service has been postponed year after year and was proposed for 2014.

On October 4, 2012, given the lack of funding, GECI Aviation Sky Aircraft went into receivership.

== See also ==
Aircraft of comparable role, configuration, and era

- Antonov An-28
- de Havilland Canada DHC-6 Twin Otter
- Embraer EMB 110 Bandeirante
- Harbin Y-12F
- Let L-410 Turbolet
- PZL M28
- Indonesian Aerospace N-219
