= Torquil Norman =

British businessman and philanthropist (1933–2025)

Sir Torquil Norman CBE
- Norman in 1997
- Born: 11 April 1933; Marylebone, London, England
- Died: 19 March 2025 (aged 91)
- Occupation: Businessman
- Spouse: Lady Elizabeth Ann Montagu (m. 1961)
- Children: 5, including Jesse and Amy

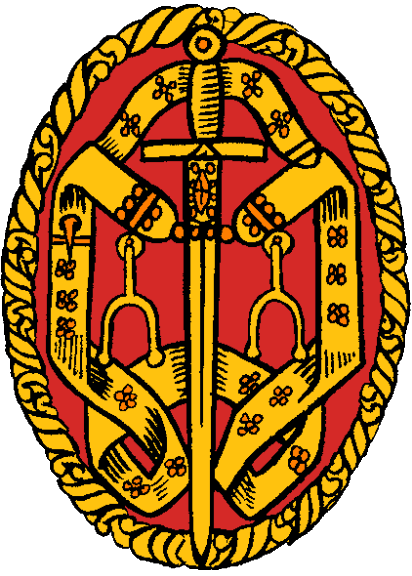
Insignia of a Knight Bachelor

Sir Torquil Patrick Alexander Norman CBE (11 April 1933 – 19 March 2025) was a British businessman, aircraft enthusiast and arts philanthropist. After taking a stake in Berwick's Toy Company, he turned it into one of the largest toy firms in the United Kingdom before he resigned from the company in 1979 due to a dispute with the board. In 1980, he founded Bluebird Toys, which made the Big Yellow Teapot House, the Big Red Fun Bus and the Polly Pocket line of dolls. Norman founded the Global Vehicle Trust, which established OX Delivers to operate trucks that affordably transport goods out of rural areas in developing countries. Norman flew multiple trans-Atlantic flights in De Havilland classic aeroplanes.

== Early life and education ==
Norman was born on 11 April 1933. He was the youngest of three sons born to Air Commodore Sir Nigel Norman, 2nd Baronet, and Patricia Moyra Annesley, daughter of Lieutenant Colonel James Howard Adolphus Annesley. His father, the only child of journalist and politician Sir Henry Norman, 1st Baronet, and novelist Ménie Muriel Dowie, was killed in action in 1943, shortly before Torquil's 10th birthday. His eldest brother, Sir Mark Annesley Norman, inherited the baronetcy and his middle brother, Desmond Norman, was an aviation pioneer.

Norman was educated at Eton College, Trinity College, Cambridge, where he was a member of the victorious 1957 Boat Race crew, and Harvard University.

== Career ==
Standing 6'7", Norman gained his pilot's licence at eighteen, and did his National Service in the Fleet Air Arm. He had to pretend that he was shorter than he actually was because he was three inches taller than the maximum height allowed for fighter pilots in the Fleet Air Arm. He survived a Hawker Sea Fury fire. After he left, he bought a Piper Comanche, flew in No. 601 Squadron RAF, and took up skydiving.

After working in the international department of J.P. Morgan in New York City, Norman became the general manager of Mineral Separations, an industrial holding company, where he sorted out small subsidiary companies that were not doing well and sold most of them off. However, he took a stake in Berwick's Toy Company and turned it into one of the largest toy firms in the United Kingdom. He resigned from Berwick's in 1979 due to a disagreement with the board. In 1980, he founded Bluebird Toys, makers of the Big Yellow Teapot House, the Big Red Fun Bus, and the successful Polly Pocket line of dolls.

A long-term Camden resident, Norman bought the derelict Roundhouse arts venue in Chalk Farm for £3 million in 1996 "as an impulse buy", having read it was proposed to turn it into an architectural museum.

As founder and chairman of the Roundhouse Trust he then raised £27 million from public and private sources, including almost £4 million more of his own personal funds, to restore the crumbling Victorian former railway repair shed, which had been a major arts venue in the 1960s and '70s. The restored Roundhouse reopened in June 2006 as a 1,700 seat performance space, with a state-of-the-art creative centre for young people in the undercroft, and a new wing with a purpose-built bar and café. It was soon the base for a major season by the Royal Shakespeare Company, played host to regular big-name rock concerts, and by 2008 had involved over 12,000 teenagers in creative arts projects.

Norman, who was previously appointed a Commander of the Order of the British Empire, stepped down as chairman of the Roundhouse Trust in 2007, and was knighted the same year for his "services to the arts and to disadvantaged young people". In 2007, he won the Beacon Fellowship Prize for his work with young people through the Roundhouse Trust.

A collector of classic aeroplanes, Norman wrote a vivid account of flying a DH Leopard Moth across the Atlantic. In 1995 Norman undertook a trans-Atlantic flight in a De Havilland Dragonfly that was delivered to its original customer in 1937. In 2000 he flew a 67-year-old Moth across the Atlantic; the plane became the oldest plane to cross the Atlantic.

Norman went on to found the Global Vehicle Trust (GVT) to provide simple, affordable, and versatile transport for rural areas in developing countries using a purpose-built truck designed and conceptualised by Sir Gordon Murray. Although the initial idea was that OX trucks would be sold to customers in developing countries for their own use, GVT established OX Delivers to operate the trucks and to sell space on its trucks to customers who need to transport goods out of rural areas in developing countries.

== Personal life and death ==
On 8 July 1961, Norman married Lady Elizabeth Ann Montagu, the daughter of Victor Montagu, 10th Earl of Sandwich. They had five children, including Conservative Party MP Jesse Norman and the artist Amy Sharrocks, and ten grandchildren.

Norman died on 19 March 2025, at the age of 91.

== Published works ==
- 2010: Kick the Tyres, Light the Fires: One Man's Vision for Britain's Future and How We Can Make It Work. Infinite Ideas. ISBN 978-1-906821-53-1.

== See also ==
- Norman baronets
