= Paravaran Asseman (Paaviation) =

Iranian aviation specialist

- Company type: Private
- Industry: Aviation
- Founded: 1974
- Headquarters: Tehran, Iran
- Area served: Tehran, Iran, Middle East
- Key people: Kian Nosratollah, CEO
- Products: Aviation
- Number of employees: 17 (2006)
- Website: Paravaran Asseman

Paravaran Asseman (founded in 1974) is an Iranian aviation specialist organization. Paravaran Asseman is Iran's only internationally certified and approved paraglider producer.

== History ==
Paravaran Asseman was founded in 1974 and is located in Tehran, Iran. In 2007, Paaviation supplied a Britten Norman Islander aircraft to the Iranian Government as the first new western-made aircraft that had been purchased by the Iranian Government since the Islamic Revolution of 1979.

Paravaran Asseman is the dealer for Britten-Norman in Iran and the Middle East and a representative for Normarc Flight Inspection Systems. Paaviation is the exclusive Iran and Middle East representative of flying schools and has a flying club in Tehran that gives pilot training for PPL CPL Licenses in Iran and the Middle East. Paravaran Asseman is the Iranian dealer and treatment specialist for aircraft anti-corrosion treatment ACF50.
