= Britten-Norman BN-1 =

BN1F - Finibee
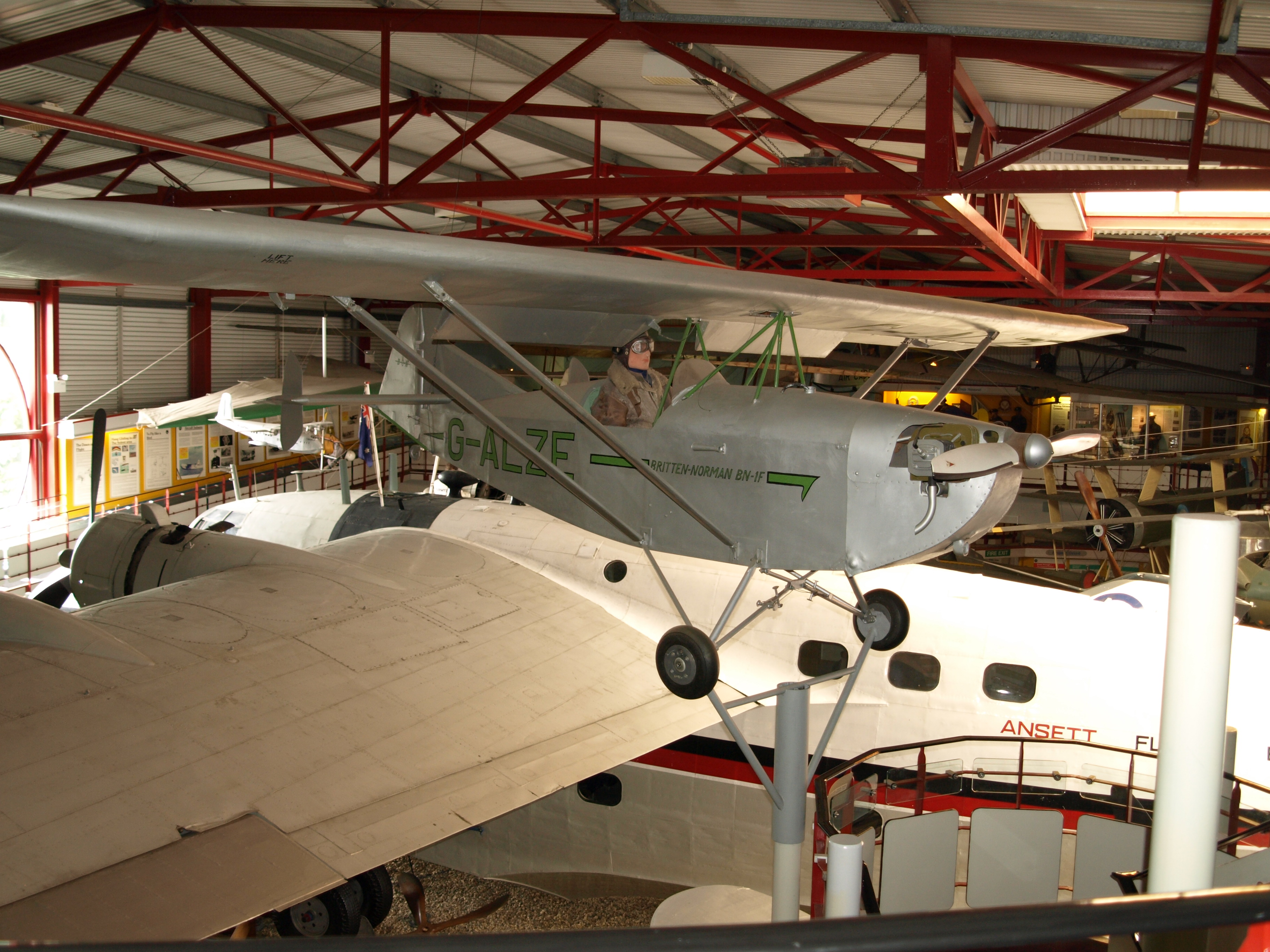
- BN-1 on display at the Solent Sky museum

General information
- Type: Ultra Light
- National origin: United Kingdom
- Manufacturer: Britten Norman
- Designer: F.R.J (John) Britten & Desmond Norman
- Status: Retired
- Number built: 1

History
- First flight: 1951
- Retired: 1959

The Britten-Norman BN-1F is a British single-seat ultralight aircraft that was built in 1950.

== Design and development ==
In 1951 Peter Gatrell, John Britten & Desmond Norman built and flew an ultra-light monoplane, their first aircraft, which made its first flight at Bembridge, Isle of Wight, on 16 May 1951. This machine crashed on an early flight, when the petrol supply to the 40 hp Aeronca-J.A.P. J-99 twin cylinder air-cooled engine faded out. Modifications were made to the tail unit by adding small ancillary fins to improve the directional stability, inset ailerons were fitted, the JAP engine was replaced by a 55 hp (41 kW) Lycoming O-145 horizontally opposed twin and the undercarriage was replaced with braced arrangement with rubber bungee springing. It was first flown in this form in May 1951 and was withdrawn from use in 1953. It is now on exhibition in the Solent Sky Museum, Southampton, England, on loan from Michael Short of Austin Texas, USA.

The general arrangement of the BN-1 is similar to that of the Comper Swift in particular G-ABUS, an aircraft that Desmond Norman was associated with, along with fellow de Havilland Technical School apprentice, Tony Cole, that they jointly acquired in 1948 and restored to flying condition. In part this was an attempt to restart the club flying scene that had been prevalent in pre-war England. The BN-1 can be seen as the first steps towards making cheap aviation available to all as the BN-2 Islander was later to achieve for developing countries.

After a period of display at the Royal Air Force Museum at RAF Cosford, the BN-1 was passed to the Solent Sky Museum in Southampton, where it is now exhibited.

John Britten and Desmond Norman went on to form Britten-Norman Ltd which became well known for the BN-2 Islander and Trislander series of aircraft and which is still in business at Bembridge, Isle of Wight.

== Specifications (Lycoming) ==
Data from

General characteristics

- Crew: 1
- Length: 16 ft 7 in (5.05 m)
- Wingspan: 23 ft 0 in (7.01 m)
- Height: 10 ft 5 in (3.18 m)
- Gross weight: 630 lb (286 kg)
- Powerplant: 1 × Lycoming O-145 4-cylinder horizontally-opposed piston engine, 55 hp (41 kW)
- Propellers: 2-bladed fixed-pitch propeller

Performance

- Maximum speed: 84 mph (135 km/h, 73 kn)
- Cruise speed: 75 mph (121 km/h, 65 kn)
