= Global Vehicle Trust =

- Type: Nonprofit organization
- Founder: Sir Torquil Norman
- Successor: Casey Norman
- Headquarters: United Kingdom

Global Vehicle Trust (GVT) was established to provide simple, affordable, and versatile transport for rural areas in developing countries.

== History ==
Global Vehicle Trust was founded by Sir Torquil Norman as a not-for-profit to develop a prototype vehicle suitable for rural parts of developing countries. The Global Vehicle Trust is part owner of OX Delivers, the developer and IP owner of the OX truck. The trust is a not-for-profit company limited by guarantee.

== OX Truck ==
The OX was originally conceived by Sir Gordon Murray for GVT and has later been developed by OX Delivers. This has been done with the support of grants from Innovate UK and Advanced Propulsion Centre.

Designed as an innovative flat-pack product (so as to be transported more efficiently as six will fit in a standard shipping container), the truck is a high capacity and designed for use on the poorly maintained and unpaved roads often found in rural areas of emerging markets. The structure is made of Engineered Laminated Panels bonded to a steel frame. Business Insider and Wired called it "as easy to build as an Ikea bookshelf", taking three trained people 12 hours to build one. Its was planned to use a 2.2 liter diesel Ford PT22 engine, but an electric version also exists.

The OX truck was featured by Top Gear in 2016.

== OX Delivers ==
In 2022 OX Delivers became a Transport-as-a-Service in Rwanda transporting goods from rural areas such as crops for farmers. It uses an electric version of the OX truck and was named one of the Best Inventions of 2022 by Time magazine.

In 2024 it signed a $163 million contract to expand its services in Rwanda. In 2026 its UK business (but not the one in Rwanda) was in risk of liquidation.
