= Hereford and South Herefordshire =

UK Parliament constituency (since 2010)

Coordinates: 51.99°N 2.78°W

- County constituency for the House of Commons
- Interactive map of boundaries since 2024
- Boundary of Hereford and South Herefordshire in West Midlands region
- County: Herefordshire
- Electorate: 72,203 (2024)
- Major settlements: Hereford and Ross-on-Wye

Current constituency
- Created: 2010
- Member of Parliament: Jesse Norman (Conservative)
- Seats: One
- Created from: Hereford, Leominster

Hereford and South Herefordshire (/ˈhɛrɪfərd ... ˈhɛrɪfərdʃɪər, -ʃər/ HERR-if-ərd ... HERR-if-ərd-sheer, -shər) is a constituency (Note: A county constituency (for the purposes of election expenses and type of returning officer)) of the House of Commons of the UK Parliament. It comprises the city of Hereford and most of south Herefordshire and has been represented since 2010 by Jesse Norman of the Conservative Party. (Note: As with all constituencies, the constituency elects one Member of Parliament (MP) by the first past the post system of election at least every five years.)

== Constituency profile ==
The Hereford and South Herefordshire constituency is located in Herefordshire and lies along the border with Wales. It covers the city of Hereford, which has a population of around 61,000, and a large rural area to its south. Other settlements in the constituency include the small market town of Ross-on-Wye and the villages of Clehonger, Madley and Peterchurch. Herefordshire is one of the most sparsely-populated counties in England. Fruit and cider production are important local industries and a high proportion of residents work in agriculture and manufacturing. Hereford is a centre for rural commerce and contains the headquarters of H. P. Bulmer, which produces a majority of the cider consumed in and exported from the United Kingdom. The constituency has average levels of wealth and deprivation, and house prices are lower than the national average.

In general, residents of the constituency are older and more religious compared to the rest of the country. They have average levels of education and household income. White people made up 96% of the population at the 2021 census. At the local council level, Hereford and Ross-on-Wye are mostly represented by Liberal Democrats whilst the rural areas elected mostly Conservative and independent councillors. An estimated 61% of voters in the constituency supported leaving the European Union in the 2016 referendum, higher than the nationwide figure of 52%.

== Boundaries ==
=== 2010–2024 ===
Following a review of parliamentary representation in Herefordshire by the Boundary Commission for England, which took effect at the 2010 general election, the county was allocated two seats. The Hereford and South Herefordshire constituency largely replaced the former Hereford seat, with the remainder of the county covered by the North Herefordshire seat. As well as the city of Hereford, the seat contains the settlements of Golden Valley, Pontrilas and Ross-on-Wye.

The constituency was defined as comprising the following electoral wards in the Herefordshire Council authority area:

- Aylestone, Belmont, Central, Golden Valley North, Golden Valley South, Hollington, Kerne Bridge, Llangarron, Penyard, Pontrilas, Ross-on-Wye East, Ross-on-Wye West, St Martins and Hinton, St Nicholas, Stoney Street, Three Elms, Tupsley, Valletts.

=== 2024–present ===
Following the 2023 review of Westminster constituencies which came into effect for the 2024 general election, the constituency comprises the following wards of the District of Herefordshire:

- Aylestone Hill, Belmont Rural, Birch, Bobblestock, Central, College, Dinedor Hill, Eign Hill, Golden Valley North, Golden Valley South, Greyfriars, Hinton & Hunderton, Kerne Bridge, Kings Acre, Llangarron, Newton Farm, Penyard, Red Hill, Ross East, Ross North, Ross West, Saxon Gate, Stoney Street, Tupsley, Whitecross, Widemarsh, and Wormside.

The seat was unchanged, except to align the boundaries with those of revised local authority wards.

== Members of Parliament ==
Hereford prior to 2010

Election	Member	Party
2010	Jesse Norman	Conservative

== Elections ==
=== Elections in the 2020s ===
General election 2024: Hereford and South Herefordshire
Party	Candidate	Votes	%	±%
Conservative	Jesse Norman	14,871	32.6	−30.6
Labour	Joseph Emmett	13,592	29.8	+9.9
Reform UK	Nigel Ely	8,395	18.4	New
Liberal Democrats	Dan Powell	5,325	11.7	−1.6
Green	Diana Toynbee	3,175	7.0	+1.9
Independent	Mark Weaden	214	0.5	New
Majority		1,279	2.8	−37.0
Turnout		45,572	63.1	−1.9
Registered electors				
Conservative hold		Swing	−19.5	

=== Elections in the 2010s ===
General election 2019: Hereford and South Herefordshire
Party	Candidate	Votes	%	±%
Conservative	Jesse Norman	30,390	61.2	+7.7
Labour	Anna Coda	10,704	21.6	−2.2
Liberal Democrats	Lucy Hurds	6,181	12.5	+5.5
Green	Diana Toynbee	2,371	4.8	+2.4
Majority		19,686	39.6	+9.9
Turnout		49,646	68.9	−2.1
Registered electors				
Conservative hold		Swing	+5.0	

General election 2017: Hereford and South Herefordshire
Party	Candidate	Votes	%	±%
Conservative	Jesse Norman	27,004	53.5	+0.9
Labour	Anna Coda	11,991	23.8	+11.0
Independent	Jim Kenyon	5,560	11.0	New
Liberal Democrats	Lucy Hurds	3,556	7.0	−3.6
Green	Diana Toynbee	1,220	2.4	−4.8
UKIP	Gwyn Price	1,153	2.3	−14.5
Majority		15,013	29.7	−6.1
Turnout		50,555	71.0	+4.2
Registered electors				
Conservative hold		Swing		

General election 2015: Hereford and South Herefordshire
Party	Candidate	Votes	%	±%
Conservative	Jesse Norman	24,844	52.6	+6.4
UKIP	Nigel Ely	7,954	16.8	+13.4
Labour	Anna Coda	6,042	12.8	+5.6
Liberal Democrats	Lucy Hurds	5,002	10.6	−30.5
Green	Diana Toynbee	3,415	7.2	New
Majority		16,890	35.8	+30.7
Turnout		47,257	66.8	−0.9
Registered electors				
Conservative hold		Swing		

General election 2010: Hereford and South Herefordshire
Party	Candidate	Votes	%	±%
Conservative	Jesse Norman	22,366	46.2	+5.7
Liberal Democrats	Sarah Carr	19,885	41.1	−2.7
Labour	Philippa Roberts	3,506	7.2	−3.2
UKIP	Valentine Smith	1,638	3.4	+1.2
BNP	John Oliver	986	2.0	New
Majority		2,481	5.1	N/A
Turnout		48,381	67.7	+2.4
Registered electors		71,435		+1,588
Conservative gain from Liberal Democrats		Swing	+4.2	

2005 notional result
Party	Vote	%
Liberal Democrats	19,964	43.8
Conservative	18,502	40.6
Labour	4,744	10.4
Others	2,408	5.3
Turnout	45,618	65.3
Electorate	69,847	

== See also ==
- Parliamentary constituencies in Herefordshire and Worcestershire
- Parliamentary constituencies in the West Midlands (region)
