= 1943 RAF Hudson crash =

Aerial accident in England

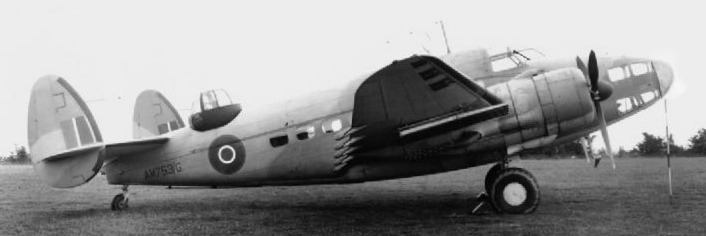
- A Lockheed Hudson Mark V, similar to the accident aircraft

Accident
- Date: 19 May 1943
- Summary: Engine failure
- Site: 50°24′36.28″N 4°56′37.11″W

Aircraft
- Aircraft type: Lockheed Hudson IIIA
- Operator: (United Kingdom) Royal Air Force
- Flight origin: RAF Portreath
- Destination: RAF Gibraltar
- Crew: 9
- Fatalities: 2
- Survivors: 7

The 1943 RAF Hudson crash was an aerial accident that killed two people. The aircraft crashed in a forced landing attempt near RAF St Eval, Cornwall, England, following engine failure.

== Aircraft ==
FH168 was a Lockheed Hudson IIIA (a lend-lease A-29-LO serial no 41-36969 and c/n 414-6458), operated by No. 38 Wing RAF, based at RAF Netheravon. On 19 May 1943, it was en route from RAF St Eval to RAF Gibraltar when it crashed and burned 7 miles (11 km) south of St. Eval. The aircraft was unable to maintain height due to one engine failing, and the load it was carrying.

== Casualties ==
Air Commodore Sir Nigel Norman, on his way to the Middle East for an Airborne Forces Planning Conference, died as a result of the crash. The only other airman killed in the crash was Pilot Officer (Obs) Arthur Rotenberg, who is buried in St Columb Major Cemetery.

== Rescue ==
The surviving crew and passengers were rescued by two nearby farm workers – William Richards and Eddie Thomas – and a nearby member of the Royal Observer Corps, George Gregory. In 1945, Gregory was awarded the British Empire Medal for his brave actions during the rescue of the crew.
