= Central Landing Establishment =

United Kingdom military research centre

Coordinates: 53.353°N 2.273°W

The Central Landing Establishment was the Second World War British development centre for airborne warfare at RAF Ringway airfield near Manchester.

== Establishment ==
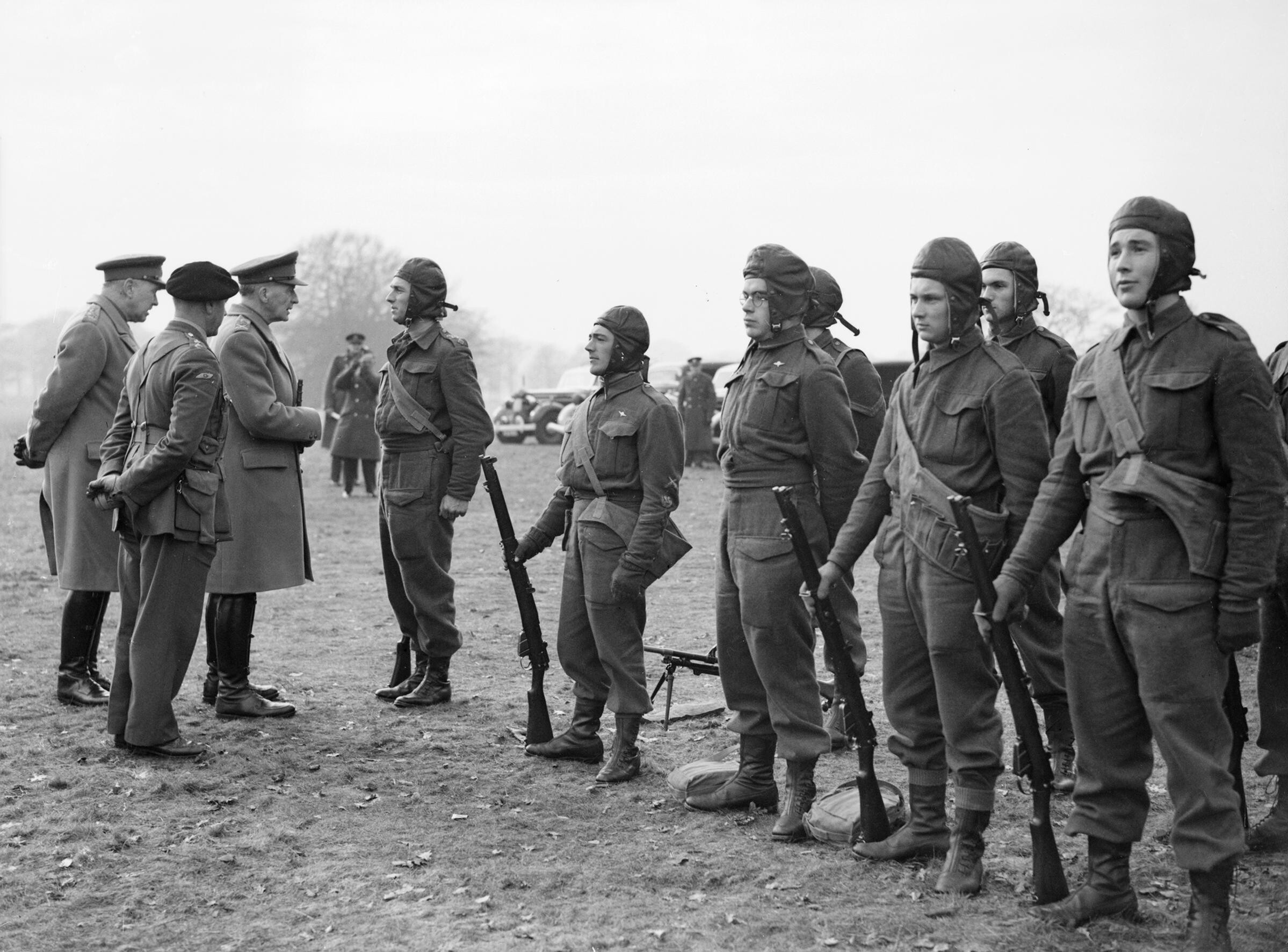
General Sir John Dill, the Chief of the Imperial General Staff (CIGS), inspecting parachute troops at the Central Landing Establishment at RAF Ringway near Manchester, December 1940.

Following Prime Minister Winston Churchill's decision to create a parachute corps within the British Army after German successes using airborne force during the early stages of the war, a parachute training school known as the Central Landing School was set up at RAF Ringway near Manchester in June 1940. On 31 August 1940, it was expanded within the school becoming the Central Landing Establishment. Group Captain Leslie Gordon Harvey became the establishment's first commanding officer on 18 September 1940. There was a separate Technical unit and the addition of the Glider Training Squadron which would be used by pilots training for the Glider Pilot Regiment.

The centre was operated by Royal Air Force and British Army officers working in collaboration.

In 1941, the Airborne Forces Establishment was created from the experimental and technical units, renamed in 1942 as the Airborne Forces Experimental Establishment. The Parachute Training Squadron became a unit in its own right as the Parachute Training School on 15 February 1942.

Glider pilot training took 24 weeks; a 12-week light pilot training course and a 12-week glider course.

== Equipment ==
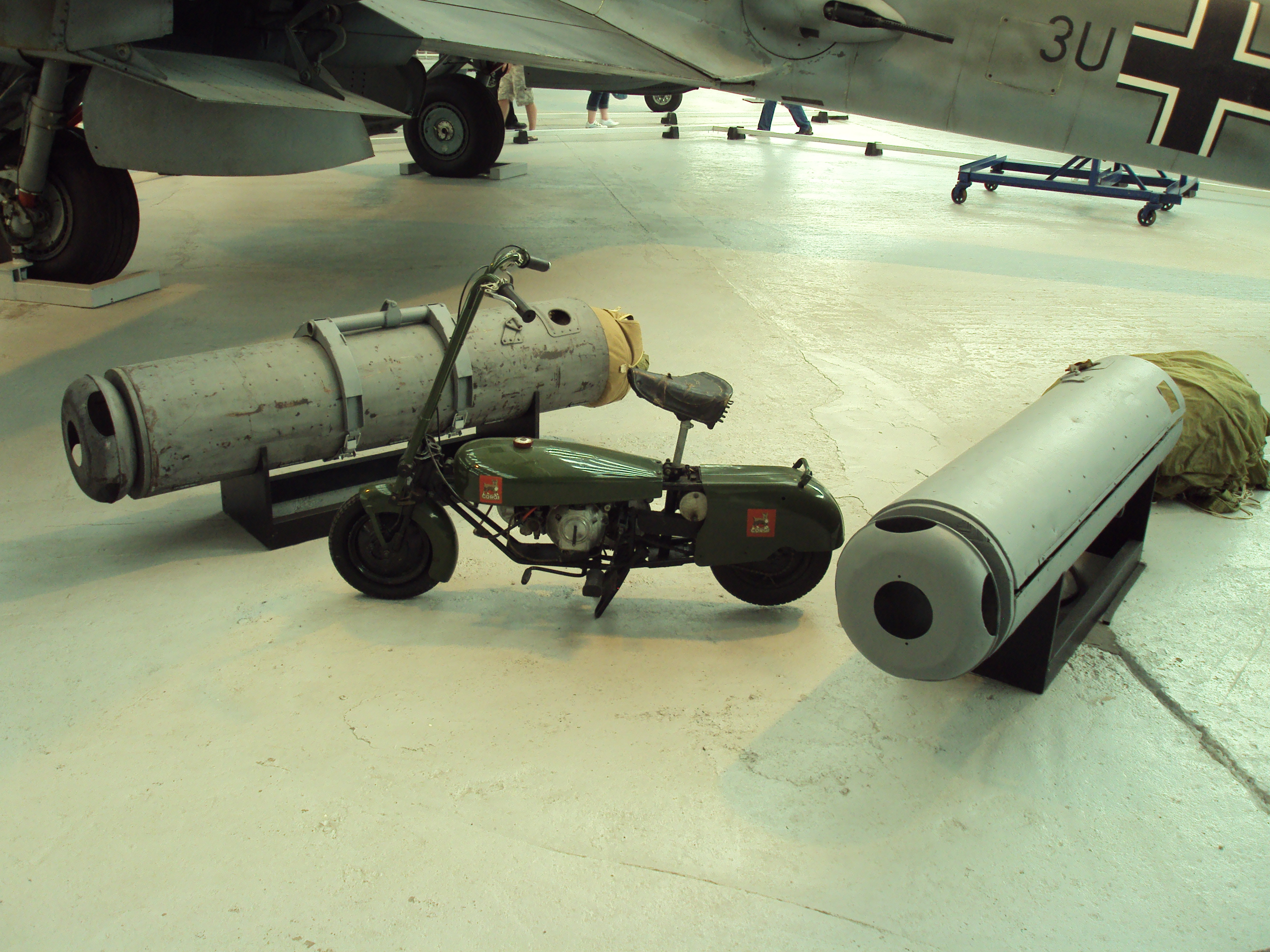
CLE Canisters displayed at the Royal Air Force Museum Cosford, along with a Corgi lightweight, folding motorcycle (2010)

The CLE developed equipment to be used by Britain's airborne forces, such as standardized equipment containers for parachuting supplies.

The Mark III CLE Canister was 6 feet (180 cm) long and 15 inches (38 cm) in diameter, with a 10-to-16-foot (3.0 to 4.9 m) parachute attached to one end and an impact absorbing "pan" at the other; the capacity was 600 pounds (270 kg). It split longitudinally for unloading. These containers would fit in the bomb bays of aircraft making resupply easier. The largest CLE canister was 3.3 m long.

An earlier Mark I canister was D-shaped in cross-section (about 15 inches in diameter). A motorcycle, the "Welbike" was developed that could be stowed in one. A cylindrical fuel can was also developed to fit the CLE Canister, with a canister able to accommodate three of the cans.

Other means of landing supplies were developed. Wicker baskets for some materiel, crates for motorcycles such as the Royal Enfield WD/RE, and the means of parachuting jeeps and light artillery pieces.

== Staff ==
- Leslie Harvey (RAF officer)
- Wing Commander Nigel Norman: Commandant 1940–1942
