= St Helen's Church, St Helens, Isle of Wight =

Coordinates: 50°42′21″N 01°06′55″W

St. Helen's Church, St. Helens
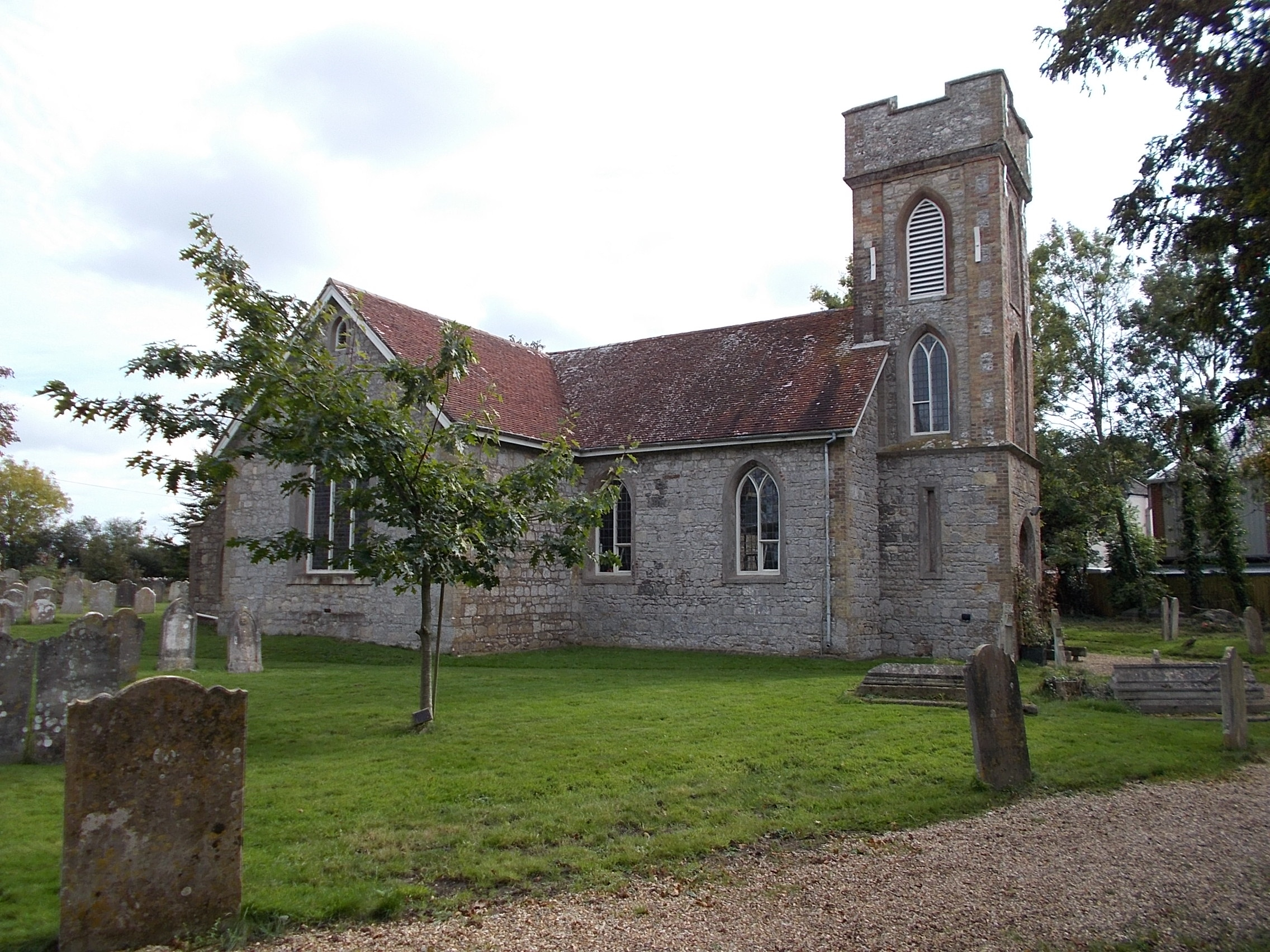
- St Helens New Church
- St. Helen's Church, St. Helens
- Denomination: Church of England
- Churchmanship: Broad Church

History
- Dedication: St. Helena

Administration
- Province: Canterbury
- Diocese: Portsmouth
- Parish: St Helens, Isle of Wight

St. Helen's Church, St. Helens is a parish church in the Church of England located in St Helens on the Isle of Wight.

== History ==
A priory at St Helens was founded after the Norman Conquest by French Benedictine monks. The previous Saxon church was rebuilt in Norman style to serve both the local parish and the new priory. The church was dedicated to St Helena, and the nearby village in due course was known by this name. The tower was added in the 13th century during the reign of Henry III.

The Benedictine priory was dissolved in 1414. Henry VI granted the priory lands to Eton College on its foundation in 1440, and the college owned it until 1799.

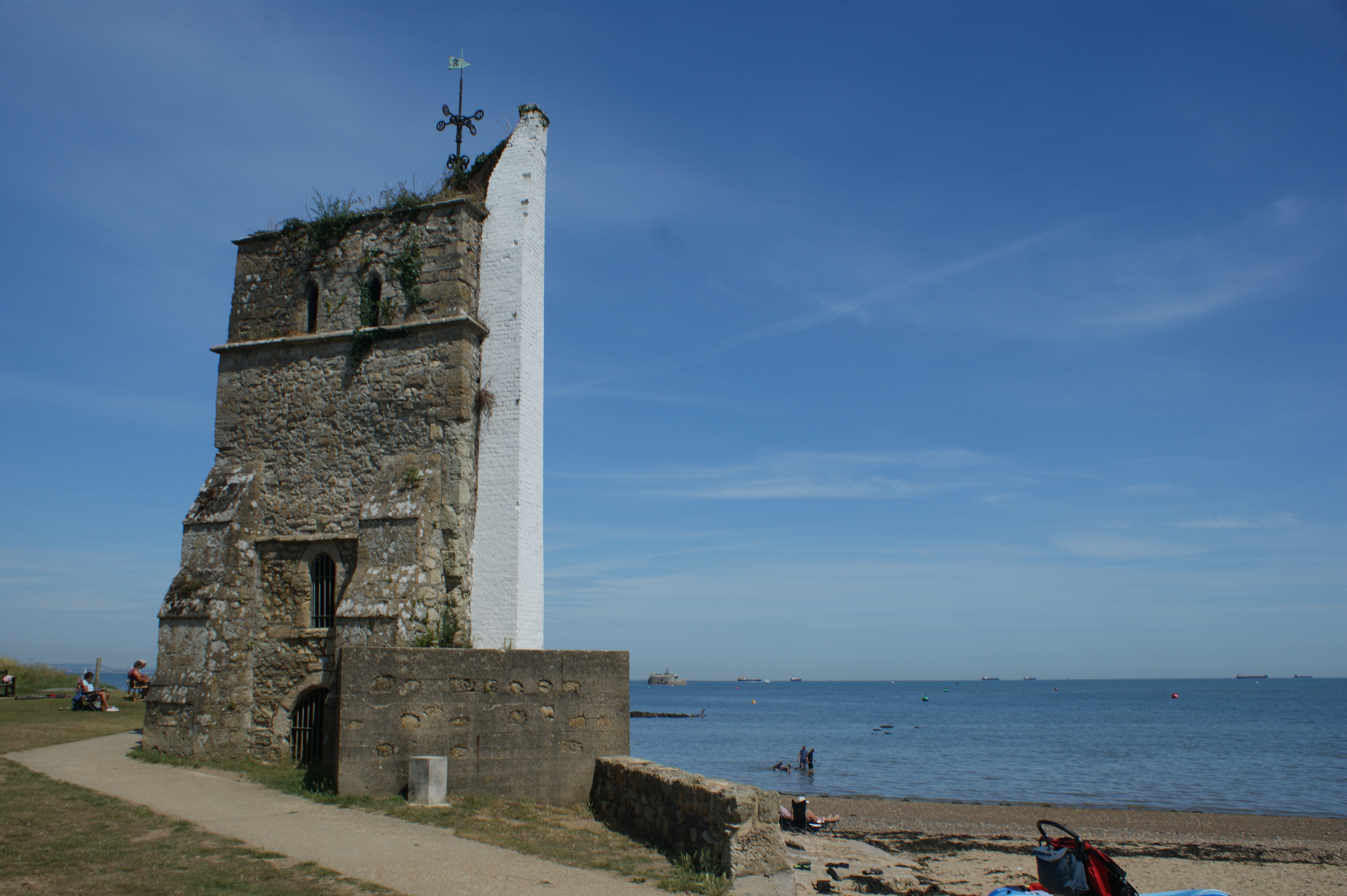
Remains of the old church

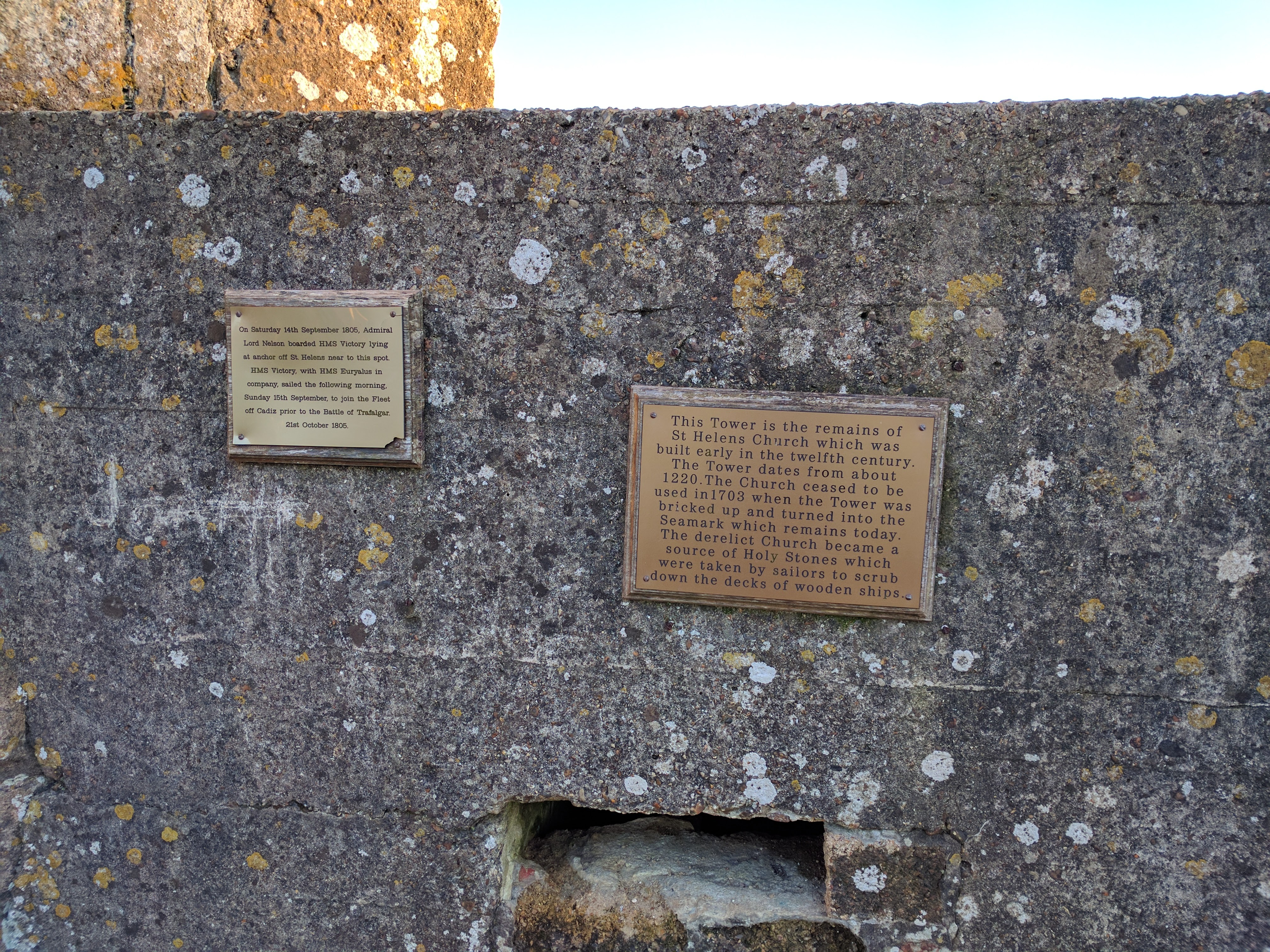
Plaques on the wall of St Helen's Old Church, Isle of Wight, describing the history of the structure and a local story about Nelson.

The original church of St. Helens was in a bad state as far back as the 16th century, according to the presentment of George Oglander, the centoner of St. Helens. By the 18th century it had become so ruinous that a new church was built and the old church allowed to go to ruin. The tower, a 13th-century structure, was the only part left standing, and can still be seen today. The garden at the rear of the old Church tower was the parish burial ground from the time of the first church until the 18th century. The tower was bricked up and painted white as a seamark for Navy ships in 1719.

Apocryphal tales suggest that stones from the old church were often taken to be used to clean the decks of sailing ships, giving rise to the practice known as ‘holy-stoning’ the decks.

Cromwell's Commissioners reported in 1656 that the "Church is washed by the sea to the foundations; fearing the fall thereof there have been endeavours to secure it with great charge". They recommended that "it be taken down ere it fall and set up in the midst of the Parish." It was sixty years before the new church was finally constructed safely inland.

== St Helens New Church ==
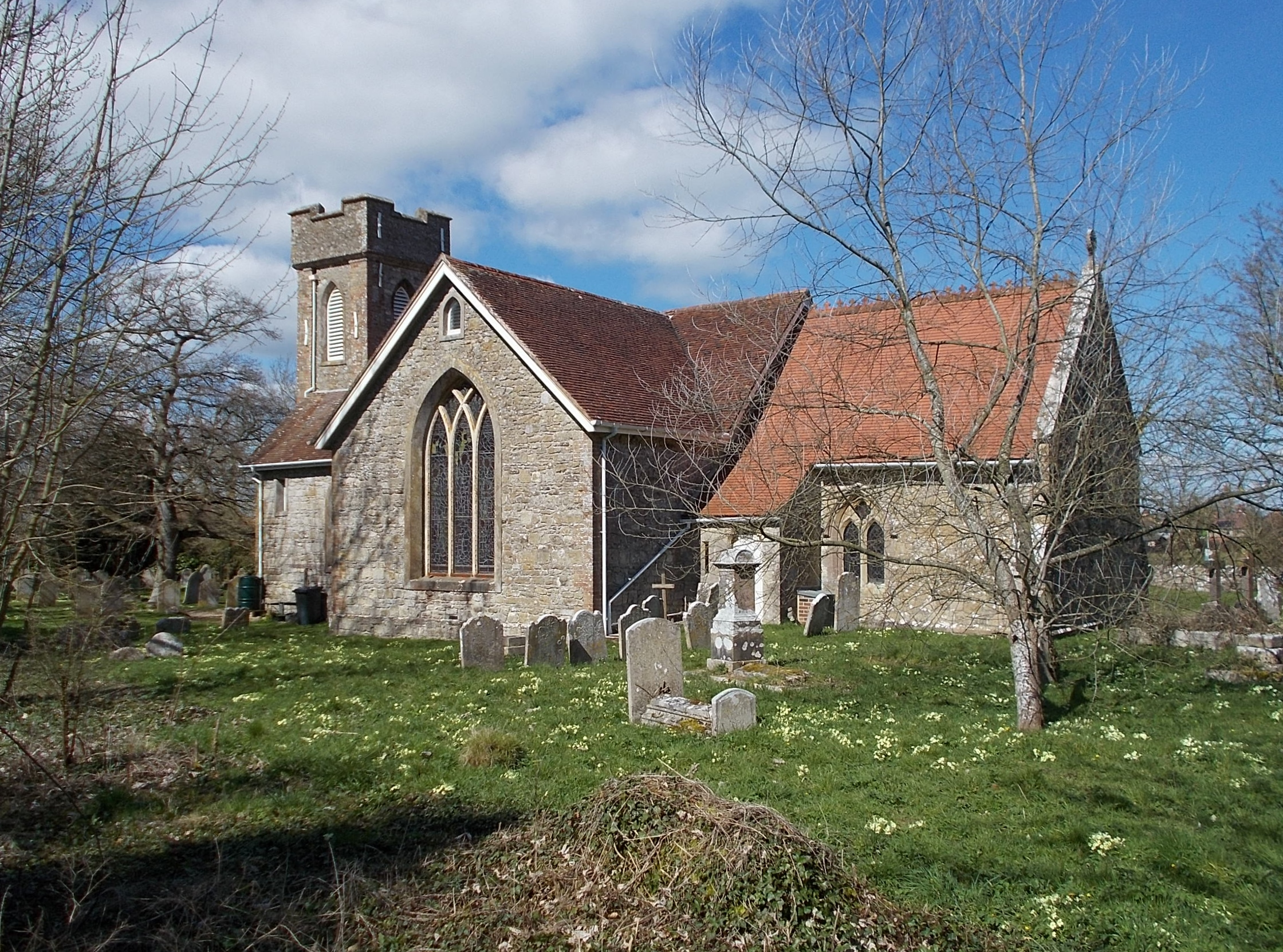
St Helens New Church

The new church was built in 1717 about a mile inland. In 1831 the church was rebuilt, and in 1862 a new chancel was erected. The present church is a stone structure with brick dressings, and consists of an aisleless nave, with transepts, a chancel, and west tower with one bell. There is a mural tablet to Sir Nash Grose, who died in 1814, and his son Edward.

=== Organ ===
There was an organ was built in 1864 by Gray & Davison. A specification of the organ can be found on the National Pipe Organ Register. This organ has been replaced by a larger instrument by Willis and Sons.
