= NAC Fieldmaster =

Fieldmaster
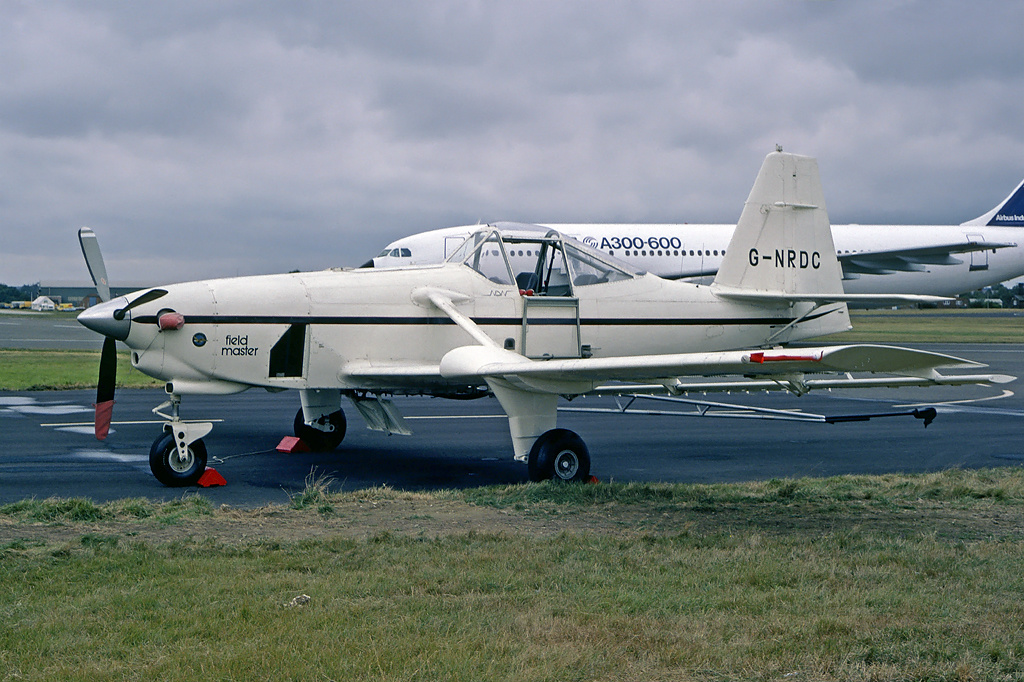
- The prototype Fieldmaster at the 1984 Farnborough airshow, 9 September 1984

General information
- Type: Agricultural Aircraft
- National origin: United Kingdom
- Manufacturer: NDN Aircraft
- Number built: 10

History
- First flight: 17 December 1981

The NAC Fieldmaster was a British agricultural aircraft of the 1980s. A turboprop powered single-engined monoplane, it was built in small numbers and used both as a cropsprayer and a firefighting aircraft.

== Development and design ==
NDN Aircraft was set up in 1976 by Desmond Norman to build the Firecracker trainer. Norman had been a founder of the Britten-Norman company, the manufacturers of the Islander. NDN Aircraft designed a new agricultural aircraft, the NDN-6 Fieldmaster. This was a large single-engined low-winged monoplane with a fixed tricycle undercarriage, powered by a Pratt & Whitney Canada PT6 turboprop engine, the first western-built agricultural aircraft to be designed for turboprop power. Novel features included an integral hopper made of Titanium to carry its chemical payload, which was dispersed via spray nozzles built into the flaps under the aircraft's wings.

The first prototype flew on 17 December 1981 at NDN's airfield at Sandown, Isle of Wight. TNDN moved the premises to Cardiff, Wales in 1985, renaming itself the Norman Aeroplane Company (NAC). Production finally started in 1987. It was intended that parts would be produced by UTVA in Pančevo, Yugoslavia (now in Serbia) to be assembled in Cardiff.

NAC went into receivership in 1988, after the production of six Fieldmasters, including the prototype. Brooklands Aerospace attempted to continue production, rebuilding one of the Fieldmasters with a more powerful engine as a specialised firefighting aircraft as the Firemaster 65, but these attempts were stopped by the outbreak of civil war in Yugoslavia.

A final attempt at production was made by the Turkish Aeronautical Association (Türk Hava Kurumu – THK) who started licensed production in 1997. This ended in 1999 after completion of two complete aircraft and a further two airframes lacking engines.

== Variants ==
NDN-6 Fieldmaster
The initial designation for the prototype; one built.
NAC Fieldmaster
Designation of production aircraft after the formation of the Norman Aeroplane Company (NAC); five built.
Brooklands Aerospace Firemaster 65
A rebuilt Fieldmaster with more powerful engine and firefighting equipment; one conversion.
THK-TAYSU
Production in Turkey by Türk Hava Kurumu (THK); four built

== Specifications (NAC 6) ==
Data from Jane's All the World's Aircraft 1988–89

General characteristics

- Crew: 1
- Capacity: optional trainee / ground operator jump seat and/or 2,032 kg (4,480 lb) dry chemicals or 2,366 L (625 US gal; 520 imp gal) liquid
- Length: 11.02 m (36 ft 2 in)
- Wingspan: 16.23 m (53 ft 3 in)
- Height: 4.12 m (13 ft 6 in)
- Wing area: 33.25 m^{2} (357.9 sq ft)
- Aspect ratio: 7.96
- Airfoil: NACA 23012
- Empty weight: 2,266 kg (4,996 lb)
- Max takeoff weight: 4,535 kg (9,998 lb) to UK CAA AN 90
- Fuel capacity: Normal 757 L (200 US gal; 167 imp gal); Maximum 1,490 L (390 US gal; 330 imp gal) (2 x 378.5 L (100.0 US gal; 83.3 imp gal) main tanks and 2x 367 L (97 US gal; 81 imp gal) auxiliary tanks); Oil 13 L (3.4 US gal; 2.9 imp gal)
- Powerplant: 1 × Pratt & Whitney Canada PT6A-34AG turboprop, 559 kW (750 hp)
- Propellers: 3-bladed Hartzell HC-B3TN-3/T10282+4

Performance

- Maximum speed: 265 km/h (165 mph, 143 kn) at sea level

265 km/h (165 mph; 143 kn) at 1,830 m (6,000 ft)

- Design manoeuvring speed: 233 km/h (145 mph; 126 kn)
- Stall speed: 129 km/h (80 mph, 70 kn) flaps up

111 km/h (69 mph; 60 kn) flaps 30°

- Never exceed speed: 318 km/h (198 mph, 172 kn)
- Ferry range: 1,853 km (1,151 mi, 1,001 nmi) with 2 crew at 3,050 m (10,010 ft), with 454 kg (1,001 lb) of equipment and max fuel with no reserve
- Service ceiling: 5,547 m (18,199 ft)
- g limits: +3 / -1.7
- Rate of climb: 4.883 m/s (961.2 ft/min)
- Wing loading: 136.37 kg/m^{2} (27.93 lb/sq ft)
- Power/mass: 8.11 kg/kW (13.33 lb/hp)
- Take-off run to 15 m (49 ft): 419 m (1,375 ft)
- Landing run from 15 m (49 ft): 419 m (1,375 ft)
- Landing run: 152 m (499 ft) at 2,720 kg (6,000 lb) with propeller reversal

== See also ==
Aircraft of comparable role, configuration, and era

- PZL-Mielec M-18 Dromader
- Air Tractor AT-400
