= Duver =

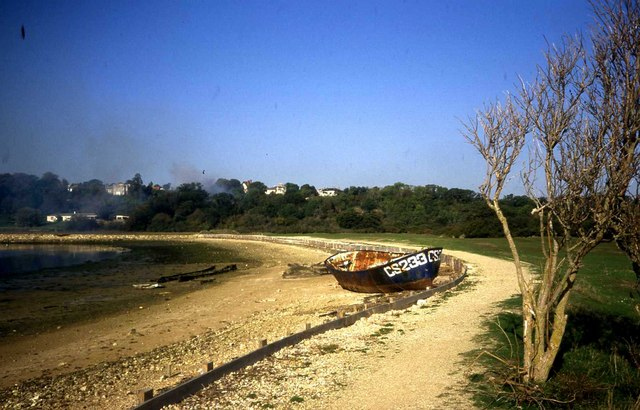
Abandoned boat at St Helen's Duver, Isle of Wight

A duver (pronounced to rhyme with cover; occasionally spelt as dover) is an Isle of Wight dialect term for a low-lying piece of land along the coast, subject to occasional inundation by the sea.

== Etymology ==
The word comes from the Old French term douvre (meaning a ditch, trench, or moat).

The name has become part of place names on the Isle of Wight, for example Dover Street in Ryde is the street which used to run down to the duver.

The word survives in the names of coastal areas at St Helens Duver, Seaview Duver and Hamstead Dover.

== Dunes ==
There are relatively few dunes on the Isle of Wight, and some have been reclaimed or otherwise lost, meaning that some places which bear the name duver are no longer sand dunes. The largest surviving example is St Helens Duver.
