= St Helens, Isle of Wight =

Village in England

Coordinates: 50.6979°N 1.1123°W

St Helens
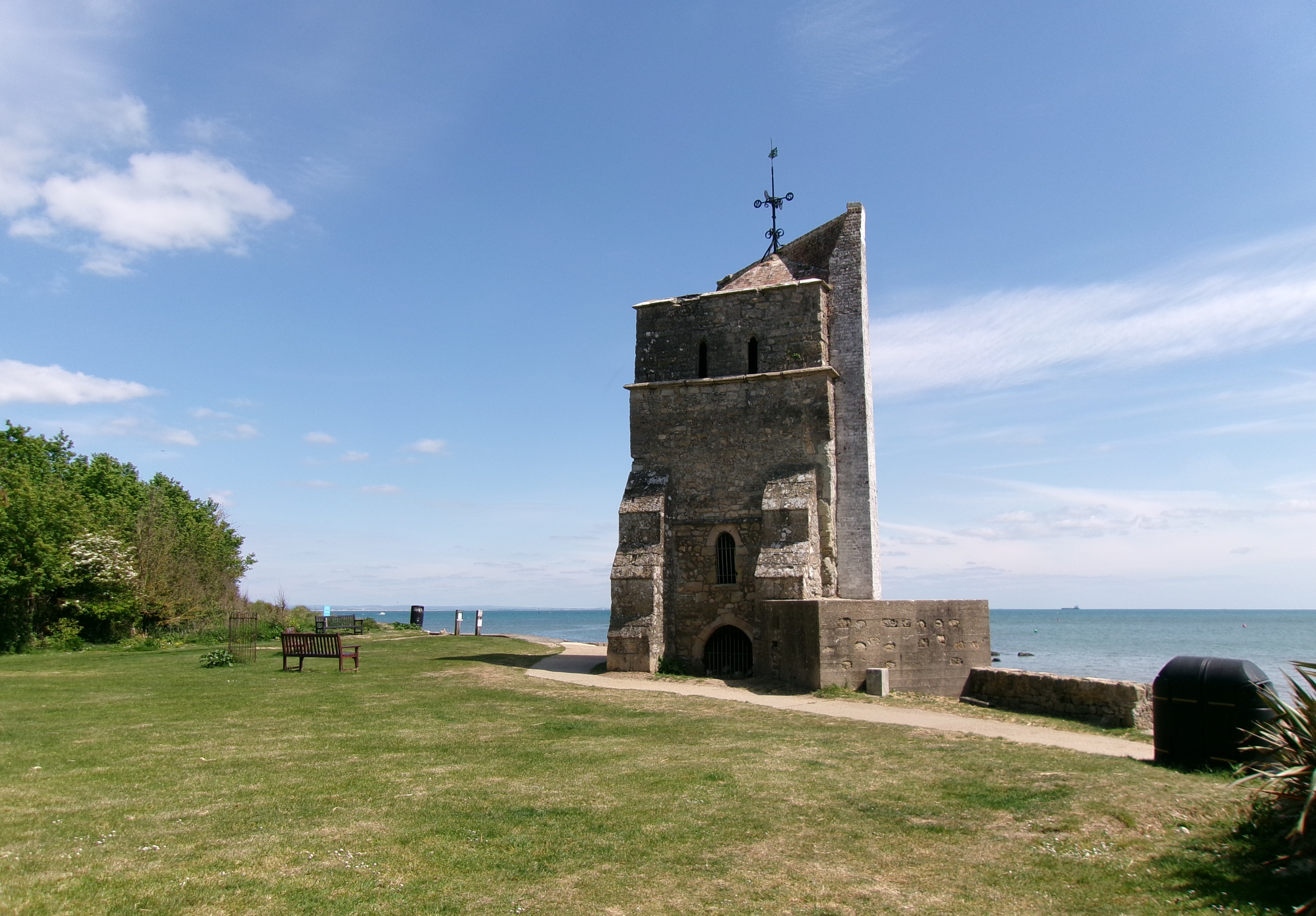
- St Helens Old Church

- Location within the Isle of Wight
- Population: 1,213 (2011)
- OS grid reference: SZ627890
- Civil parish: St Helens
- Unitary authority: Isle of Wight
- Ceremonial county: Isle of Wight
- Region: South East
- Country: England
- Sovereign state: United Kingdom
- Post town: RYDE
- Postcode district: PO33
- Dialling code: 01983
- Police: Hampshire and Isle of Wight
- Fire: Hampshire and Isle of Wight
- Ambulance: Isle of Wight
- UK Parliament: Isle of Wight East

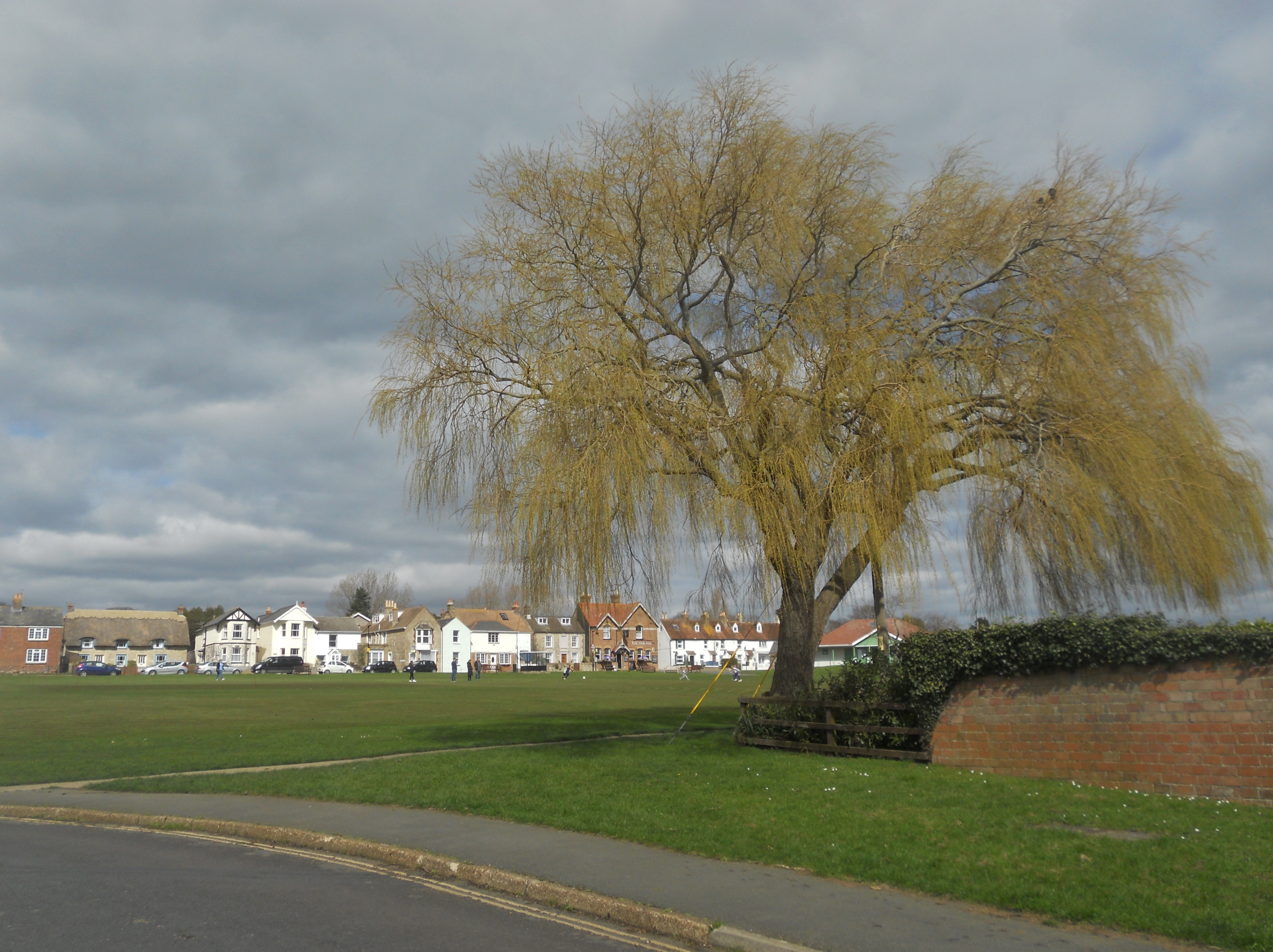
View of the village across the green.

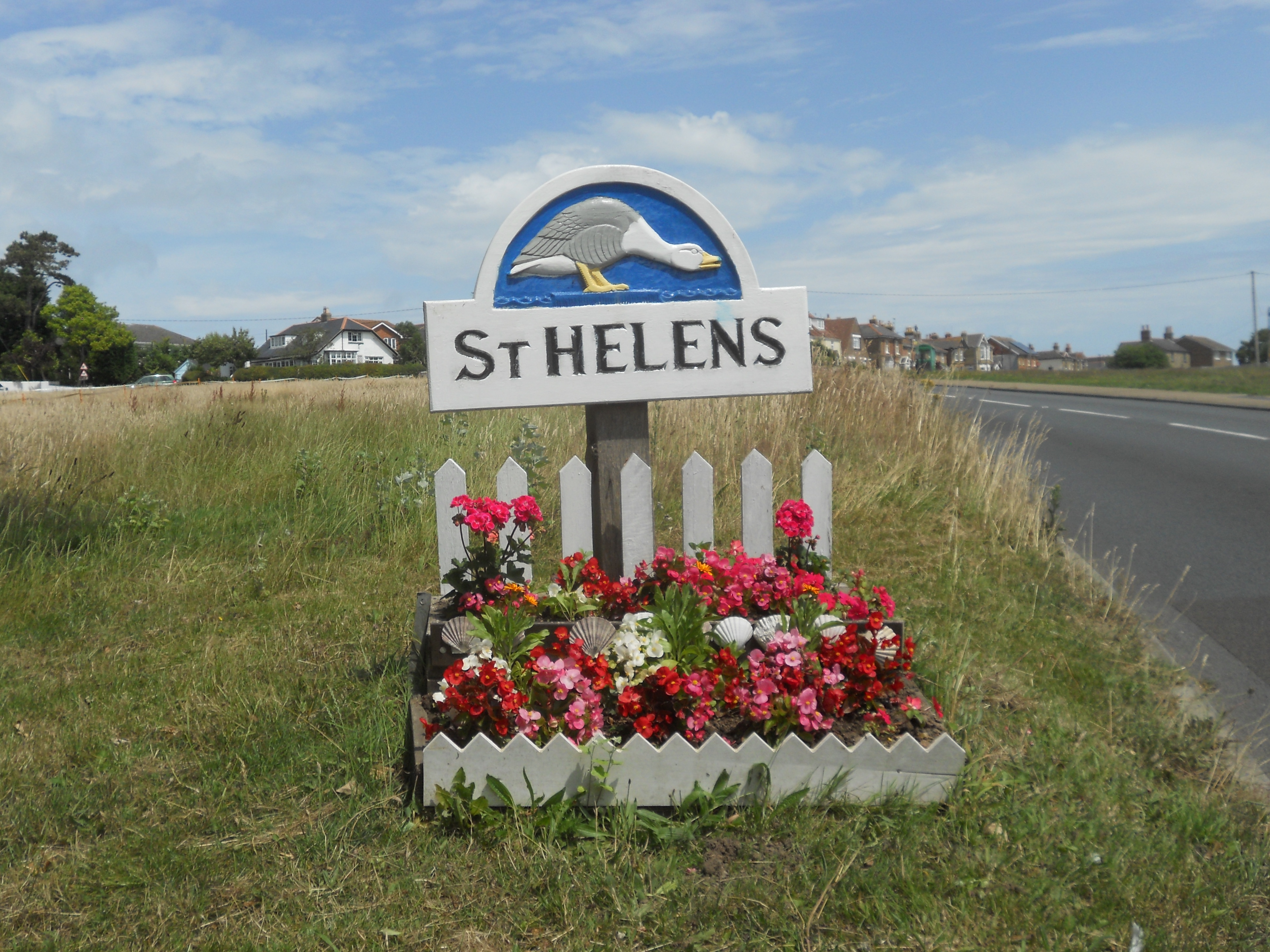
Sign one sees on entering the village from the south

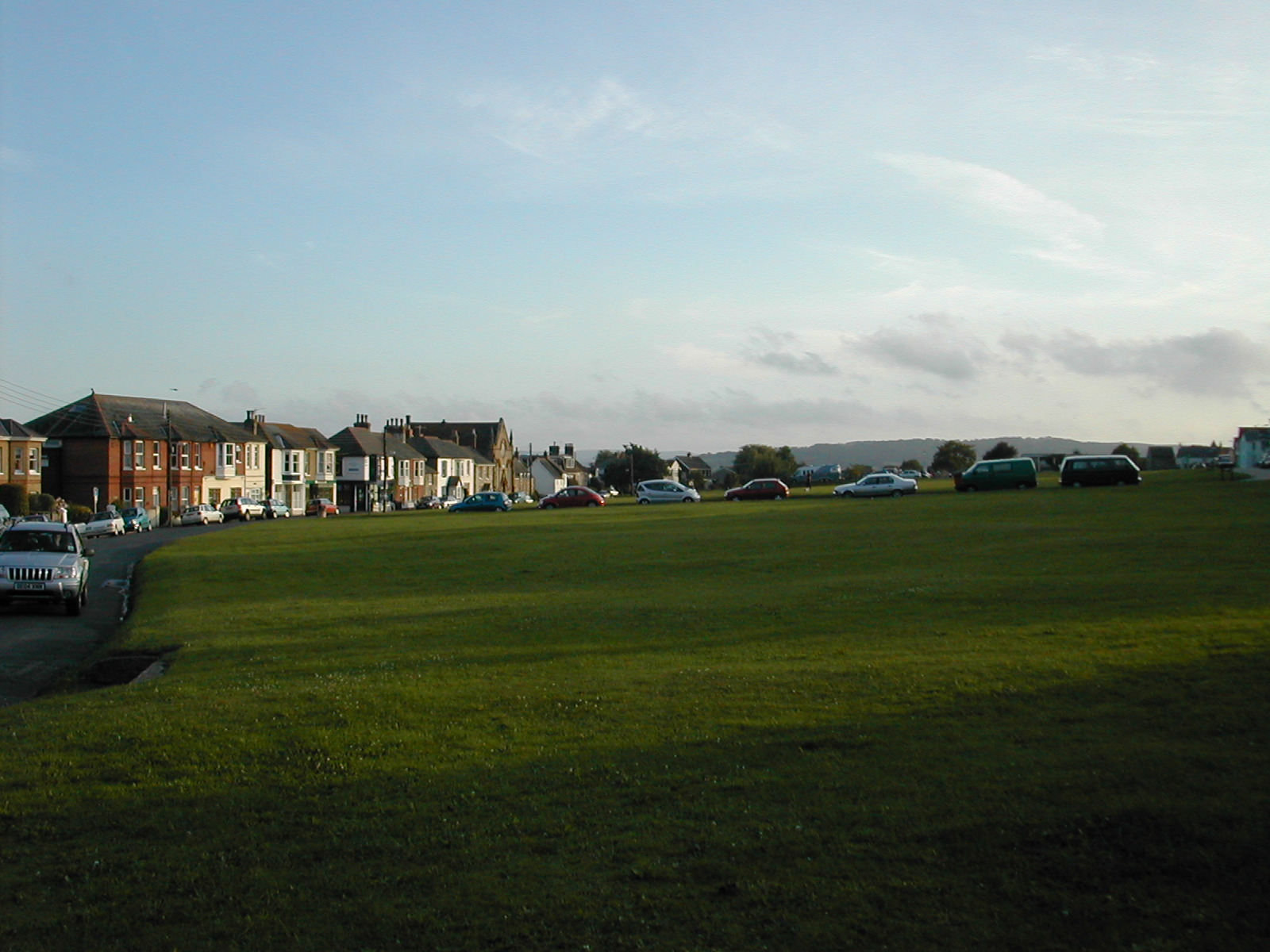
Another view of the village from the green.

St Helens is a village and civil parish located on the eastern side of the Isle of Wight.

The village developed around village greens. This is claimed to be the largest in England but some say it is the second largest. The greens are often used for cricket matches during the summer and football in the winter, and also include a children's playground.

The village is a short distance from the coast, about a ten-minute walk to St Helens Duver. The Duver was once the location of the island's first golf course (one of England's first golf courses), which for a while was almost as famous as the golf course at St Andrews. It is now a popular beach for tourists during the summer season and is protected by the National Trust.

It is linked to other parts of the island by Southern Vectis bus route 8 serving Ryde, Bembridge, Sandown and Newport including intermediate villages.

The town is the namesake of the title for Alleyne FitzHerbert, 1st Baron St Helens, after whom Mt. St. Helens, the volcano in the United States, was named.

== Name ==
The village is named in dedication to St Helena Church, a destroyed church built in the 12th century and attached to a Cluniac priory. Only the tower of the church remains, as the rest was eroded away by the sea. The present church of St Helens was built a mile inland to replace it.

Previous names include Sancta Elena (12th century), 1279: Seynte Eleyne, 1418: Seyntelenes and 1544: Saint Ellyns.

In the Domesday Book (1086), the manor of Etharin is possibly related to St Helens. The name possibly is from æt harum, meaning '(the place) at the cairn or heap of rocks and stones', from Old English dative plural hær, preceded by the preposition æt.

The village was sometimes called Eddington, probably meaning 'the farmstead or estate belonging to a woman called Ēadwynn', from Old English Ēadwynn (personal name) and tūn.

== History ==
The origin of St Helens seems to revolve around the Cluniac Priory and the monastic church, built circa 1080. In 1340 a French raid landed at St Helens but was repulsed by Sir Theobald Russell. In 1346 Edward III set sail from St Helens to invade Normandy.

After Henry V suppressed the alien priories in 1414 the old church became the parish church. The original church eventually became unsafe and a new one was built further inland. In 1720 a great wave destroyed the old church, though the church tower still stands to this day; the seaward side is painted as a sea mark. It is believed that Admiral Lord Nelson's last view of England was of the St Helens seamark - HMS Victory had anchored nearby to collect drinking water, before setting sail for Cádiz and participation in the Battle of Trafalgar.

There used to be a ferry service running to Bembridge when the Eastern Yar was a broad tidal creek.

In the early 18th Century, the entrance to the harbour was near the church. Attempts at reclamation of the harbour, which were unsuccessful due to locals removing building materials, resulted in the harbour being moved. The church was undermined by the quarrying of stone from the beach, which accounts for the large dressed blocks leading along the beach to Priory Bay. A small gun battery, which has been lost to the sea, once defended the entrance.

Dressed stones from the walls of the destroyed church, which were soft sandstone, were found to be good for scrubbing the decks of wooden planked warships - hence the terms 'holystone' and 'holystoning the decks'.

The closest Royal Commission sea fort to the island is St Helens Fort, named after St Helens. Historic England has St Helens Fort listed as a Scheduled Monument and Grade II Listed Building.

== Geography ==
St Helens is located to the east of the Isle of Wight on high ground to the north of Bembridge, giving it views over the harbour. The nearest town is Ryde, about 3 miles (4.8 km) away.

The village is located on the coast, with St Helens Duver nearby at the mouth of the harbour. The area features a sand-dune complex where the first golf course on the island was located, and where there is now a sheltered beach, cafe and beach huts. The Duver is no longer a golf course and is maintained by the National Trust. A promenade stretches along the beach, with the sand dunes at the rear. During the summer season the beach is litter picked, with large amounts of seaweed removed and given to local farmers for composting. In 1997, the beach was given a Seaside Award Flag.

The Eastern Yar, which rises near Niton to the south of the island, runs to the south of the village into Bembridge Harbour, en route to the Solent.

St Helens' built environment is set around large village greens, which are often claimed to make up the second largest green in England. The greens are split up in some areas to allow for roads, with housing and other development to the north and south sides of the greens.

== Amenities ==
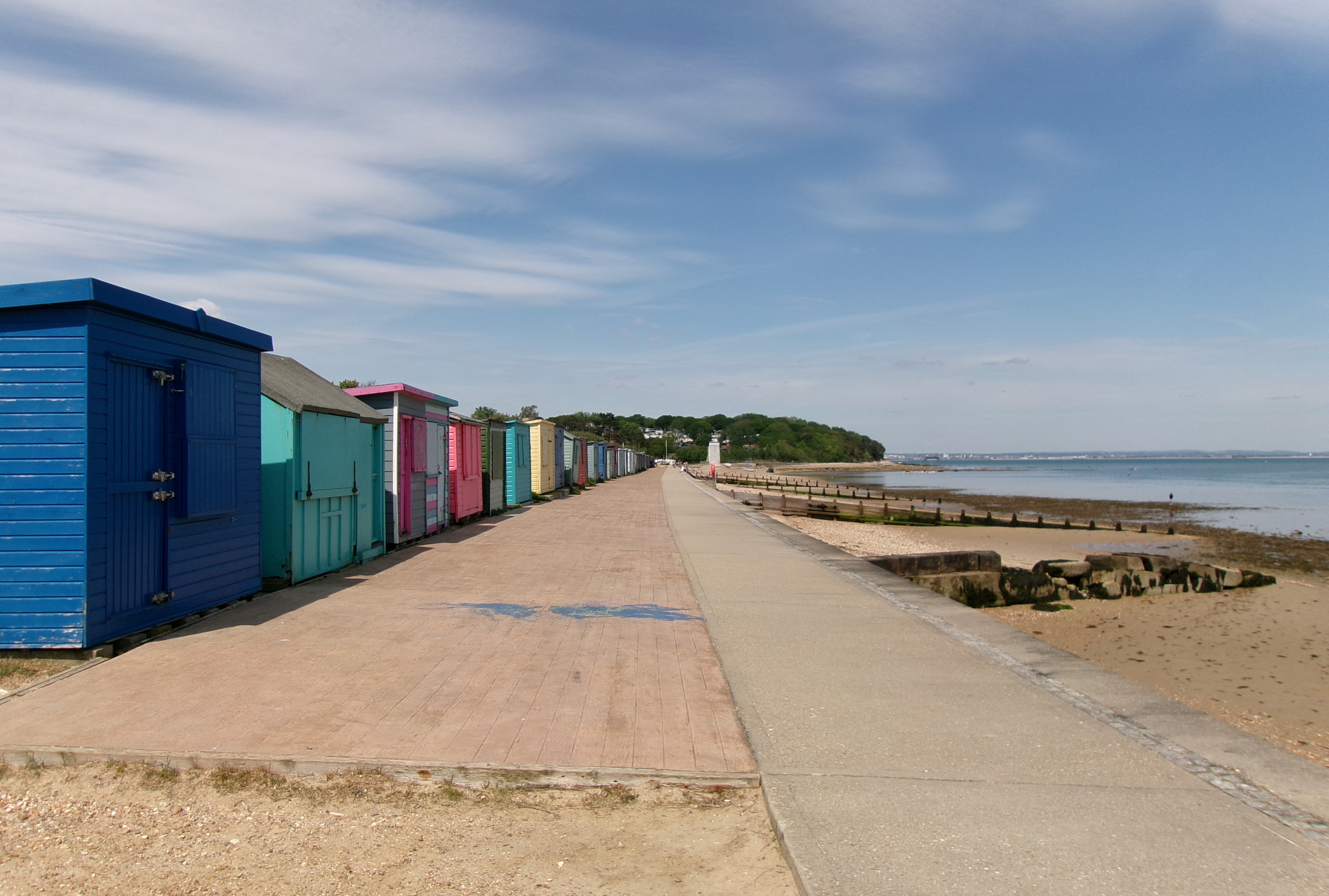
The seafront at St Helens, with the white sea mark of the old church tower in the distance

St Helen's Church is the village's Anglican parish church located just outside the main village. It was first built in 1717 but then rebuilt in 1831. The present church is a stone structure with brick dressings, and consists of an aisleless nave, with transepts, a chancel and west tower with one bell.

St Helens Community Centre replaced the old tin tabernacle. This is located on the corner of Guildford Road and Upper Green Road St Helens. Bookings can be made for hire of this Community Centre and it is a popular place for meetings. There is a chapel incorporated within the Community Centre so that people who cannot get to the main St Helens Church can come here.

St Helens Pavilion is a very important amenity especially for sporting events such as cricket and football that take place on St Helens Green.

The Vine Inn is a Public House on Upper Green Road, opposite the village green. It is over 100 years old. Until the late 1960s it was adjoined by a rival pub, the Sailor's Home.

St Helens Post Office is the key shopping centre of St Helens village. It is the "corner shop" on Upper Green Road. This shop sells general groceries and is the local newsagents. More recently it has opened up a café.

Priory Bay Hotel is now the subject of a major planning application as announced in the Isle of Wight County Press. "FORMERLY one of the Island’s top hotels, Priory Bay could be back in businesses following a multi-million pound makeover."

St Helens Primary School Broomlands Close St Helens. For much of 2008, it looked likely that the school would be closed following education reforms to move the island to a two-tier education system, however the village protested with signs displayed across the village stating "We love St Helens Primary School", which in March 2009 prevented the school from closure.

== Notable residents ==
- Sophie Dawes, Baronne de Feuchères – "adventuress" best known as a mistress of Louis Henry II, Prince of Condé
- Jeremy Irons – film actor, Oscar and double Emmy winner
- Alfred Toogood – professional golfer who lived at Eddington Road and played at the Royal Links Club
