= Norman baronets =

Baronetcy in the Baronetage of the United Kingdom

The Norman Baronetcy, of Honeyhanger in the Parish of Shottermill in the County of Surrey, is a title in the Baronetage of the United Kingdom. It was created on 22 June 1915 for the journalist and Liberal politician Henry Norman. The second Baronet, Sir Nigel Norman was an Air Commodore in the Auxiliary Air Force (Reserve) and was killed in action in 1943. The third Baronet was high sheriff of Oxfordshire from 1983 to 1984 and a Deputy Lieutenant of the county in 1985.

Priscilla Norman, second wife of the first Baronet, was a socialite and activist.

== Norman baronets, of Honeyhanger (1915) ==
- Sir Henry Norman, 1st Baronet (1858–1939)
- Sir (Henry) Nigel St. Valery Norman, 2nd Baronet (1897–1943)
- Sir Mark Annesley Norman, 3rd Baronet (1927–2013) He was brother to Desmond Norman and Torquil Norman.
- Sir Nigel James Norman, 4th Baronet (born 1956)

The heir apparent is the present holder's son Antony Norman (born 1995).
