= Desmond Norman =

English aircraft engineer (1929–2002)

Desmond Norman CBE
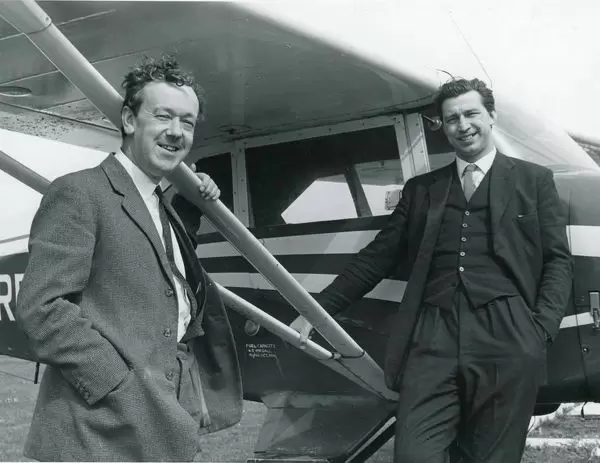
- Norman (right) with his business partner John Britten, 1966
- Born: 13 August 1929; London, England
- Died: 13 November 2002 (aged 73); Basingstoke, Hampshire, England
- Resting place: Gore Cemetery, Arreton
- Education: Twyford School; Portsmouth Abbey School; Eton College; de Havilland Technical School
- Occupation: Aircraft engineer
- Known for: Aircraft designs including the Britten Norman Islander
- Title: Commander of the Order of the British Empire (1970); Fellow of the Royal Aeronautical Society; Chartered Engineer
- Spouses: Anne Fogg Elliot (m. 1956; div. 1964); Boel Holmsen (m. 1965)
- Father: Sir Nigel Norman, 2nd Baronet

Nigel Desmond Norman, CBE, FRAeS (13 August 1929 – 13 November 2002) was a British aircraft designer and aviation pioneer. Norman co-founded Britten-Norman in 1954, was appointed a Commander of the Order of the British Empire in 1970, and served as chairman and managing director of AeroNorTec (1988–2002). With his longtime friend and business partner John Britten, he also designed, built, and sailed racing yachts, as well as a series of air cushion vehicles and crop spraying equipment. He died of a heart attack at age 73 in 2002.

Norman's grandfather was Sir Henry Norman, 1st Baronet, a Liberal politician, and his father was aviator and engineer Sir Nigel Norman, 2nd Baronet.

== Early life ==
The son of Nigel Norman, he attended Twyford School in Winchester, before being evacuated to the United States during the Second World War. There, he allegedly had a fight with the young Ted Kennedy. Returning to England, he was sent to Eton in 1945. At Eton, he kept a Norton motorbike in town and was given to riding it in school clothes. He was outstanding at sport, particularly on the rugby field and in the Eton Eight, which he stroked at Henley in 1946. He went straight from Eton into a two-year engineering apprenticeship at the de Havilland Technical School. Here, he met John Britten, whose enthusiasm for aircraft design matched his own. The two young men also shared a passion for sailing and one of their first joint commissions was to take an old 80 ft (24 m) ketch across the Atlantic to the Bahamas. As a National Serviceman, he won the Sword of Honour during training, before spending two years in the Royal Air Force as a fighter pilot. He later joined the Royal Auxiliary Air Force No. 601 Squadron RAF. Desmond Norman's older brother Mark Annesley Norman (see Norman Baronets) worked for Bristol Siddeley Engines and later for Britten-Norman as sales manager. Norman was a member of the Royal Yacht Squadron, regularly raced his own designs and designed and built Wavewalker, a two-masted gaff rigged 70 ft (21 m) schooner, for his family. In early 1953, John Britten and Desmond Norman designed and had built a 21 ft (6.4 m). Junior Offshore Group sailing boat. Prior to turning the Britten-Norman partnership into an incorporated company, Norman spent almost two years as an export assistant with the Society of British Aerospace Companies.

== Aviation career ==
In 1954, Desmond started Britten-Norman with co-founder John Britten, a fellow de Havilland graduate. Norman discovered, in John Britten, a partner who was equally keen to make a career out of aircraft design. The two men built their first aircraft at Britten's home, on the Isle of Wight. The BN1F was a 36 hp (27 kW) ultra-light aircraft. The aircraft was a commercial failure, but with a third partner, Jim McMahon, they formed a crop-spraying company, Crop Culture (Aerial) Ltd. It was to be Norman's first big success. The reason was a revolutionary rotary atomiser, whose potential in aerial work Norman had recognised and set about developing.

== Crop spraying equipment ==
Desmond Norman recalled that Britten-Norman came about as an aircraft manufacturer because of his and John Britten's experiences as agricultural operators. The partnership began by converting Tiger Moths for export to New Zealand and later moved on to develop spraying equipment. Edward Bals designed the first Micronair rotary atomiser suitable for mounting on an aircraft but, rather than get involved with aircraft, he encouraged Britten-Norman Limited and Jim McMahon to set up Micronair Limited. At one time, Britten-Norman operated 80 agricultural aircraft and the need to consider replacement equipment led to an association with Leyland Snow of Texas. The company acquired a one-third share in the Snow Aeronautical Corp. equity and a lot of the Snow Commander's development had taken place before the whole enterprise was sold to North American Rockwell. The aircraft became the Rockwell Thrush Commander. The success of the crop spraying operations funded the realisation of Britten and Norman's dream: to design and build an aeroplane. At the time, there was no other aircraft that filled its remit, and Norman foresaw the market potential of an island-hopping passenger plane. In 1963, Norman and Britten sold their share of Crop Culture to other members of the Board, to concentrate their efforts on production of the Britten-Norman Islander. A prototype, G-ATCT, was completed within nine months and made its maiden flight in June 1965. Production was centred at Bembridge, Isle of Wight, United Kingdom.

== Hovercraft ==
In 1960 Britten-Norman developed the early Cushioncraft with support from Elders and Fyffes Ltd. to look at methods of transporting banana crop from plantations in Southern Cameroons. Cushioncraft Ltd was formed out of the hovercraft division of Britten-Norman. In 1966 the British Hovercraft Corporation Ltd took a 20% shareholding. Britten-Norman Ltd had a shareholding in Hovertravel Ltd (now the world's oldest hovercraft transport company), of which Norman was a director since its inception in 1965. In 1968 he was voted off the Board whilst John Britten remained on the Board. Hoverwork Ltd, a subsidiary of Hovertravel, occupies the former Cushioncraft facilities at Woodnutts yard, Bembridge.

== Post Britten-Norman activities ==
In 1971, Britten-Norman went into liquidation and was purchased by the Fairey Aviation group in 1972, Norman stayed on as managing director until 1976.

Clark-Norman Aircraft Ltd. (Triloader Aircraft Corp. NV Woudstraat 21, B-3600 Genk, Belgium) This company was formed in 1995 to develop the Triloader turbo-prop powered 19,000-pound (8,600 kg) (all-up weight) cargo aircraft. Design offices were based on the Isle of Wight with production undertaken by Triloader Aircraft of Belgium. Norman's co-designer on this aircraft was Alec N. Clark, formerly of Hawker Siddeley. Following the failure to secure long term funding for the Triloader, Clark transformed Triloader Aircraft corp into Wolfsberg Aircraft Corporation NV through which Clark developed the Raven 257 to compete with the BN Islander.

AeroNorTec Ltd / Atlantic Group The AeroNorTec company was formed in 1988 (dissolved 2004) and was based in Wales and the Isle of Wight. It became part of the Atlantic Group of companies based at Coventry Airport and specialised in all aspects of light aircraft design and matters relating to G. A. certification including Powerplant changes, major airframe modifications and new aircraft designs. Norman advertised in Flight magazine AeroNorTec's ability to carry out projects right through to compliance with clients' airworthiness certification requirements. Norman held the position of Chief Designer of Tenencia Aerospace Norman had been associated with the company in its earlier incarnation when in 2005, the Design Department of Atlantic Airmotive Ltd (formerly Atlantic Aeroengineering Ltd) was subject to a management buyout and a new company was formed: Tenencia Ltd. In 1998 Norman as chief designer of Atlantic Aeroengineering worked on a project with Wilksch Airmotive Ltd to retrofit Cessna-150/152 to a Wilksch Avtur burning engine Norman moved his design agency from Bembridge to Baginton, Coventry Airport, up until his death he had offices with Air Atlantique, with his knowledge in aircraft design was used to further develop pollution control equipment.

Thales/Racal electronics The need for a special airborne research aircraft capable of being fitted with a special forward radome was created by the Racal, later Thales electronics company. Desmond Norman designed the necessary modifications to Dakota G-ANAF which included the radome from a Britten-Norman Defender aircraft, the aircraft would be operated by the Atlantic group on special flights from Coventry around Malvern to test the respective equipment, an underfin was later added for improved directional control together with other detail differences.

NDN / NAC / Norman Aircraft In 1976 Desmond Norman founded NDN Aircraft Ltd. The company name was changed to The Norman Aeroplane Company with effect from 22 July 1985 when the company moved to Wales, simultaneously with a transfer of its manufacturing base to Cardiff Airport, Wales, largely funded by the Welsh Development Agency. Financial problems resulted in NAC calling in a receiver, Price Waterhouse, on 26 July 1988.
Designed by Desmond Norman;the prototype Fieldmaster (G-NRDC), was first flown at Sandown (Isle of Wight) 17 December 1981; first production Fieldmaster (G-NACL) flew 29 March 1987; production.

Croplease / EPA Aircraft Subsequently, rights to the Fieldmaster agricultural and firefighting aircraft were sold to Andrew Mackinnon of Croplease Ltd in October 1988. Early in 1989 assembly of the Fieldmaster was resumed by Brooklands Aircraft Co Ltd. Also in early 1989, several potential purchasers had expressed interest to the receiver in taking over production of the NAC1 Freelance four-seat utility aircraft. Croplease plc was formed in April 1989 and acquired the Fieldmaster rights and Croplease Ltd business. Rights in Croplease plc designs were sold to EPA Aircraft Company in 1992. who attempted a joint venture with the Yugoslav Utva Aviation Industry organisation.

Firecracker A new company was formed, Hunting Engineering Firecracker Aircraft Ltd to win the RAF's need for a new basic trainer – it was not successful.

The prototype aircraft, including the turbine version (1T) flying with the National Test Pilots School (Flight Research Inc) in Mohave, continued to be supported by Norman up to his death. Norman commissioned RCS Aviation Ltd to reverse engineer and retrofit a CNC machined spar modification into the (Experimental category) Turbine Firecracker. This STC standard modification improved the fatigue life of the aircraft to 12,000 hours.

Skylander project In early 2000 Norman was associated with the design of the Skylander project developed by GECI International of France. The Skylander SB-105 concept was based on an enlarged Britten-Norman Islander configuration. Norman commissioned RCS Aviation Ltd to conduct an initial design assessment of aerodynamic loads, control and stability. This assessment resulted in an increase in fin area and other structural recommendations. Norman oversaw the development of the Skylander SB-105 using GECI engineering resources in Romania. GECI CEO Serge Bitboul in the meantime paved the way towards commercialisation of the SK-105 which finally saw the company Sky Aircraft SAS based at Chambley-Former aerodrome (LFJY) in Lorraine (Metz region) in 2008. Sky Aircraft SAS was put into administration in October 2012 and liquidated in April 2013.

== Aircraft designs ==
- Britten-Norman BN-1 Finibee
- Clark-Norman Triloader proposal for a three-engined transport aircraft With an engine configuration almost identical to that of the Trislander but with three 45 kW(600 hp) turboprops. Preliminary performance figures indicated a take-off run at sea level of just 740 feet (230 m); long-range cruise speed of 155 kn (287 km/h; 178 mph); and a range of 580 km (360 mi) with a payload of 3,000 kg (6,600 lb). The large hold could have accommodated up to five LD3 containers. Side doors were proposed for palletised cargo and a front-loading door for containers and bulky goods. Wingspan was 24.4 m (80 ft) and length 19.05 m (62.5 ft).
- NAC Fieldmaster
- Croplease Firemaster 65
- NAC Freelance
- NDN Firecracker
- Britten-Norman Nymph
- Britten Norman Islander
- Britten-Norman Trislander
- Fairey-Britten-Norman Mainlander The aircraft was designed to carry 100 passengers or ten tonnes of freight or vehicles over 250 miles (400 km) at 200 kn (370 km/h; 230 mph). At the maximum take-off weight of 62,500 lb (28,300 kg) and sea level, ISA plus 20 °C (68 °F), the unfactored take-off distance to 35 ft (11 m) is 2,250 ft (690 m). It was to be powered by three Rolls-Royce Dart RDa7s rated at 2,280 t.e.h.p.(wet) arranged in a layout similar to that of the company's Trislander design.
- GECI Skylander
- The Norman Weekender, was a folding-wing two-seat biplane designed to fit in a box towed on a trailer, ready to fly in a few minutes.

In 1995 Norman produced a design patent for a STOL aircraft of swept wing planform with forward cockpit and pylon mounted propeller of larger than normal diameter with fixed downwardly inclined thrust line. The wing root leading edge could include a locker for luggage, or a compartment for an injured person on a stretcher. Aeronortec Patent Design GB 2280882

== Personal life ==
Desmond Norman married Anne Fogg Elliot in 1956. They had two sons before their marriage was dissolved in 1964. In 1965, he married Boel Holmsen (née Suenson) and had two sons, one daughter, and one stepdaughter. Norman died of a heart attack at Basingstoke railway station, in Hampshire, on 13 November 2002.
