= NDN Firecracker =

1970s British military trainer aircraft

NDN-1 Firecracker
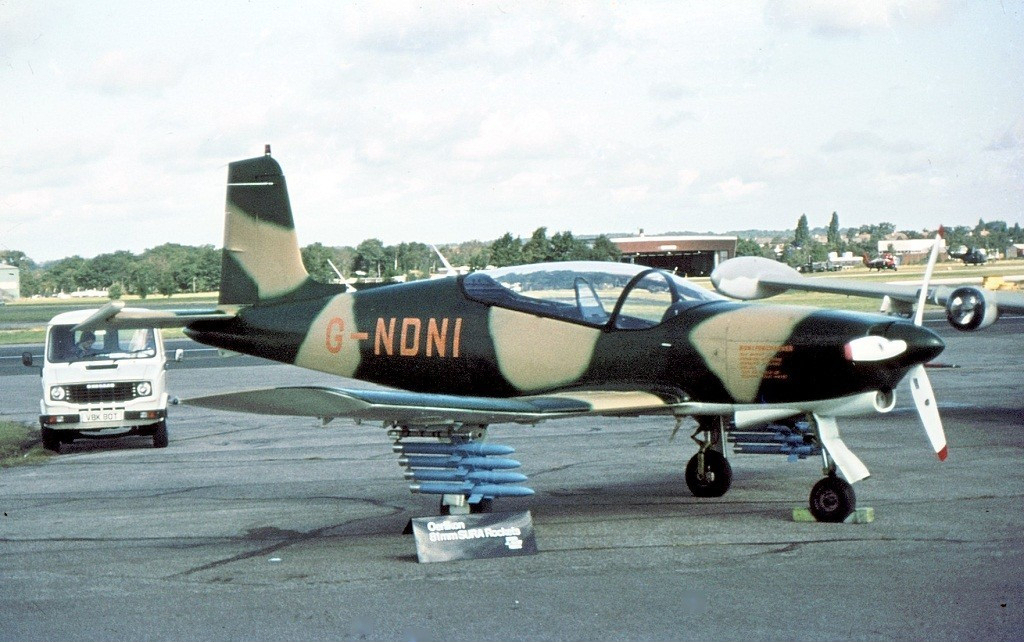
- NDN Firecracker demonstrator at the 1980 Farnborough Airshow

General information
- Type: Trainer
- National origin: United Kingdom
- Manufacturer: NDN Aircraft
- Number built: 4

History
- First flight: 26 May 1977

The NDN Firecracker is a single-engine aircraft designed as a military trainer.

== Design and development ==
In 1976, Nigel Desmond Norman, one of the founders of Britten-Norman, the manufacturers of the Islander, set up NDN Aircraft to build the Firecracker, a single piston-engined trainer designed to replicate the handling of a jet trainer. It was intended that the Firecracker would have a simple structure to allow it to be built under license by third-world countries to help start up local aviation industries. The first prototype, powered by a Lycoming O-540 piston engine, flew on 26 May 1977.

The aircraft configuration is a tandem two-seat aircraft with retractable tricycle landing gear. It has a low aspect ratio wing in order to give fighter-like handling and is fitted with an airbrake.

After producing a single piston-engined prototype, NDN developed the aircraft by fitting a Pratt & Whitney Canada PT6 turboprop engine, producing the NDN-1T Turbo-Firecracker. Three NDN-1Ts were built for a British commercial flying school, Specialist Flying Training, which used them for contract training of foreign military students, the first one flying on 1 September 1983. The Firecracker was entered into the competition to replace the BAC Jet Provosts used by Britain's Royal Air Force as a basic trainer, it being proposed to fit the aircraft for the RAF with a more powerful engine and ejection seats. Although the Firecracker, which was planned to be built by Hunting Group if successful, was one of the four shortlisting aircraft, (the others being the Pilatus PC-9, Embraer Tucano and AAC A20 Wamira), ultimately a much modified version of the Tucano, the Shorts Tucano was chosen.

Although NDN, which renamed itself the Norman Aircraft Company (NAC) in 1985, continued to try to sell the Firecracker, no further production ensued, and NAC went into receivership in 1988.

== Specifications (Turbo Firecracker) ==
Data from Jane's All the World's Aircraft 1988-1989

General characteristics

- Crew: 2
- Length: 8.33 m (27 ft 4 in)
- Wingspan: 7.92 m (26 ft 0 in)
- Height: 3.25 m (10 ft 8 in)
- Wing area: 11.89 m^{2} (128.0 sq ft)
- Aspect ratio: 5.28:1
- Airfoil: NACA 23012
- Empty weight: 1,117 kg (2,463 lb)
- Max takeoff weight: 1,633 kg (3,600 lb)
- Fuel capacity: 405 L (89 imp gal; 107 US gal) internal fuel
- Powerplant: 1 × Pratt & Whitney Canada PT6A-25 turboprop engine, 533 kW (715 shp) equivalent
- Propellers: 3-bladed Hartzell HC-B3TN-3/T10173K-1 constant speed propeller, 2.13 m (7 ft 0 in) diameter

Performance

- Maximum speed: 367 km/h (228 mph, 198 kn) at 4,600 m (15,000 ft)
- Cruise speed: 333 km/h (207 mph, 180 kn) at 6,100 m (20,000 ft) (econ. cruise)
- Stall speed: 111 km/h (69 mph, 60 kn) (EAS)
- Never exceed speed: 533 km/h (331 mph, 288 kn) (EAS)
- Range: 1,158 km (720 mi, 625 nmi) with maximum standard fuel
- Ferry range: 2,038 km (1,266 mi, 1,100 nmi) with external fuel
- Service ceiling: 8,260 m (27,100 ft)
- g limits: +6/-3
- Rate of climb: 10.5 m/s (2,060 ft/min)
- Take-off run to 15 m (50 ft): 500 m (1,600 ft)
- Landing distance from 15 m (50 ft): 677 m (2,221 ft)

Armament

- Hardpoints: 4 with a capacity of 181 kg (400 lb) each

== See also ==
Aircraft of comparable role, configuration, and era

- Pilatus PC-9
- Short Tucano
