= Britten-Norman =

British aircraft manufacturer

Britten-Norman Aerospace Ltd
- Type: Limited
- Founded: July 29, 1954; 72 years ago
- Founders: John Britten; Desmond Norman
- Headquarters: Bembridge, England, UK
- Number of locations: 7
- Area served: Worldwide
- Key people: William Hynett (Chief Executive)
- Products: Islander; Defender 4000
- Operating income: US$20,000,000
- Number of employees: 115
- Parent: Fairey Aviation (1973–1978); Oerlikon-Bührle (1978–1998); British Aerospace (1998); Biofarm (1998–2000); B-N Group (2000–2024); Britten-Norman Aerospace (2024–present)
- Subsidiaries: Cushioncraft (1960–1972)
- Website: britten-norman.com

Britten-Norman (BN) is a privately owned British aircraft manufacturer and aviation services provider. The company is the sole independent commercial aircraft producer in the United Kingdom.

Britten-Norman has so far manufactured and sold its aircraft to customers in more than 120 countries. In addition to aircraft manufacturing, the company also performs maintenance, overhaul and repair work as well as performing sub-contract engineering and design work.

The company's historic home is located at Bembridge on the Isle of Wight although airframes have been assembled under subcontract in Romania for more than 50 years. Romanian aircraft used to pass through to the UK for finalisation and certification. Nowadays aircraft are manufactured in the UK at the company's Lee-on-the-Solent manufacturing facility at Daedalus Airfield, a former Royal Naval Air Station. Spare parts production continues at the Bembridge site with sub assemblies also being supplied from the Romanian facility.

The company manufactures such aircraft as the Islander and the militarised Defender both of which are capable of short take-off and landing (STOL) operations. The three-engined Trislander is still operating but is not currently being manufactured. The aircraft are typically used for inter-island schedules.

== History ==
John Britten and Desmond Norman started developing crop-spraying equipment in the middle 1950s and used de Havilland Tiger Moths (modified at their factory near Ventnor, Isle of Wight) for a contract in Sudan. After that, Britten and Norman (who had both trained with De Havilland) turned their hand to aircraft design.

Their first design was the Britten-Norman BN-1 Finibee, a light single-seater parasol wing aircraft. They pitched the design to several aircraft companies but found no one willing to produce the design.

Britten and Norman made a detailed analysis of the aviation market and decided there was a demand for a twin-engined utility aircraft with the minimum of complex systems that could operate from short, rough airstrips and also be used for high-density commuter flights. This brief developed into the BN-2 Islander, and the Britten-Norman company was formed to produce the aircraft, which first flew in 1965.

During the 1960s, Britten-Norman were involved in the development of hovercraft via their subsidiary Cushioncraft Ltd; their first craft, the CC1, was the world's second hovercraft.

Desmond Norman then designed a four-seater touring aircraft to compete with established types such as the Cessna 172 and Piper Cherokee. A single prototype of the BN-3 'Nymph' was built and flown in 1969, but failed to attract significant orders. Norman set up his own company to build the plane, renamed the 'Freelance' and produced components and fuselage sections for six aircraft. However, orders were still not forthcoming and, following failure to win a military order for the 'Firecracker' design, Norman's company closed. After Norman's death in 2002, his son has overseen the completion of one of the Freelances to airworthy condition, and plans to assemble and sell the other five, with the possibility of full-scale production.

Following the failure of the 'Nymph', Britten-Norman continued to develop and improve the Islander design, which was enjoying great success. This culminated in 1970 with the Trislander, a trimotor version with greater range and capacity. In 1975 Britten-Norman won the Queen's Award to Industry for technological innovation for the Trislander.

Ownership of the company has passed through a number of hands. The Fairey Aviation group acquired Britten-Norman in 1973. Following financial troubles at Fairey the company was sold to Oerlikon-Bührle (owner of Pilatus Aircraft of Switzerland in 1978, hence the Pilatus Britten-Norman designation of some of the aircraft). Oerlikon-Bührle sold Britten-Norman to Litchfield Continental / Biofarm Inc. (BIOF). B-N Group acquired the assets of Britten-Norman in 2000.

In March 2024, the company announced it had secured new investment from a group of investors led by 4D Capital Partners LLP.

== Aircraft ==
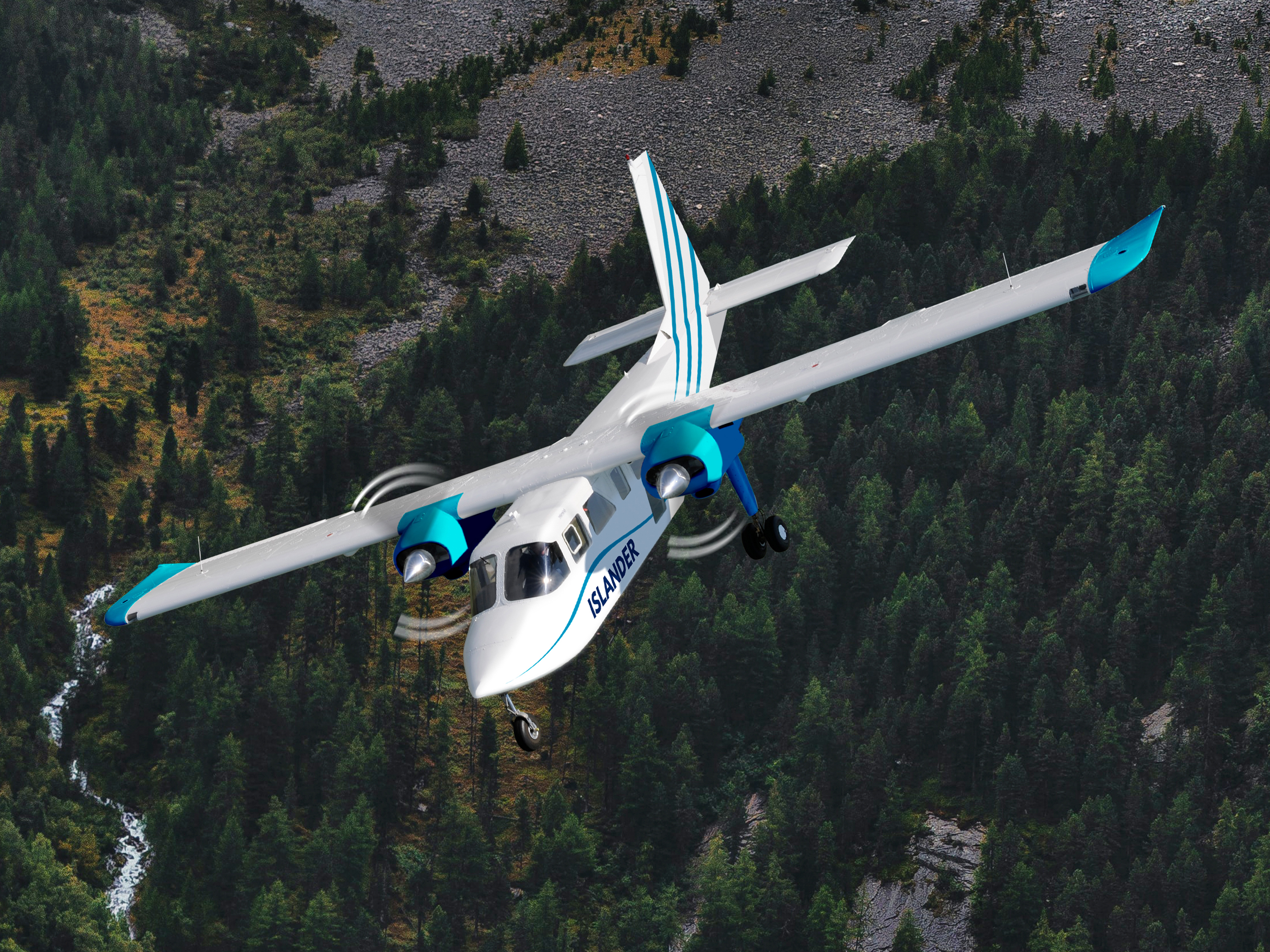
Britten-Norman BN-2 Islander

Model name	First flight	Number built	Type
Britten-Norman BN-1	1951	1	Single engine ultralight aeroplane
Britten-Norman BN-2 Islander	1965	1,280	Twin engine airliner
Britten-Norman BN-2 Defender	1970	1,280	Twin engine military utility aeroplane
Britten-Norman BN-2 Trislander	1970	72	Trimotor airliner
Britten-Norman BN-3 Nymph	1969	2	Single engine utility aeroplane

== See also ==
- Aerospace industry in the United Kingdom
