= Murder of June Anne Devaney =

1948 child murder in Blackburn, England

June Anne Devaney
- Devaney, c. spring 1948
- Born: June 1944; Blackburn, Lancashire, England
- Died: 15 May 1948 (aged 3); Queen's Park Hospital, Blackburn, Lancashire, England
- Cause of death: Shock due to multiple skull fractures and extensive internal injuries
- Body discovered: Queen's Park Hospital, Blackburn 53°44′14″N 2°27′40″W (approximate)
- Resting place: Blackburn Cemetery; 53.766312°N 2.473279°W (approximate)
- Known for: Murder victim

The murder of June Anne Devaney is a British child murder, which occurred on 15 May 1948, when a girl aged 3 years 11 months was abducted from her cot while an inpatient at Queen's Park Hospital in Blackburn, Lancashire. The child was removed to the grounds of the hospital, where she was raped, before suffering extensive blunt force trauma to her skull when her head was repeatedly swung into a sandstone wall. The assault caused extensive internal injuries and multiple skull fractures, causing the child to develop a fatal state of shock. Her murderer, 22-year-old Peter Griffiths, was arrested three months after the crime and was subsequently tried and convicted of June Anne's murder. He was hanged on 19 November 1948.

To solve the crime, police obtained the fingerprints of every male aged 16 and above who had been in the vicinity of Blackburn on the night of 14–15 May and compared them to those left at the crime scene by the perpetrator.

The investigation into the murder of June Anne Devaney was a milestone in the history of forensic science, being the first time a mass fingerprinting exercise had been employed to solve a murder in the United Kingdom.

== Hospital admission ==
June Anne Devaney had been admitted to the Queen's Park Hospital in Blackburn, Lancashire, on 5 May 1948, to recover from a mild bout of pneumonia. She was placed in Ward CH3 of the premises, being under the supervision of nurse Gwendolyn Humphreys at night. By 14 May, Devaney's condition had improved, and she was due to be discharged from Queen's Park Hospital the following morning.

Shortly after midnight on 15 May, nurse Humphreys was in the ward's kitchen preparing the children's breakfast when she heard the cry of a small boy emanating from Ward CH3. She checked the ward, soothed the child—six-year-old Michael Tattersall—and returned him to his cot, noting as she did so the child in the adjacent cot—June Anne Devaney—was asleep. Humphreys then returned to her breakfast duties before checking on the children in her care in Ward CH4, then CH3. (Note: All the children in wards CH4 and CH3 on the night of 14–15 May were under the age of seven.)

=== Abduction and murder ===
At 1:20 a.m., Humphreys felt a draught and noticed an open porch door at the end of Ward CH3. She closed the door, then saw that June Anne's cot was empty, and that a trail of adult footprints — made by stockinged feet — were upon the highly waxed floor. Ominously, the drop side of Devaney's cot was still in place, meaning the child had to have been lifted from her cot.

Nurse Humphreys made a quick search of the ward, desperately attempting to find June Anne, before alerting other staff to the fact a child was missing. After 30 minutes of fruitless searching, staff contacted the local police, who arrived at 1:55 a.m. and immediately began a search of the hospital and its grounds.

== Discovery ==
At 3:17 a.m., police found June Anne's body. She lay face down in the grass directly alongside an eight-foot (2.4 m) tall sandstone boundary wall some 300 feet (91 m) from the ward. Her nightdress was torn and raised to waist level, exposing her buttocks and immediately apparent were extensive bloodstains upon her clothing, numerous skull fractures, bludgeoning about her face, and blood exuding from her nostrils.

The discovery of the child's body and the injuries she had suffered immediately sparked a major murder investigation. As such, the area where June Anne's body was discovered was promptly cordoned off, the hospital became a crime scene, and the entire ward was secured and searched. At 4:20 a.m., the chief constable of Blackburn Police contacted Scotland Yard, seeking the assistance of an experienced investigator, who—alongside a sergeant—caught the 6:20 a.m. train from Euston to Blackburn.

I am not ashamed to say I saw it through a mist of tears. Years of detective service had hardened me to many terrible things ... but this tiny pathetic body, in its nightdress soaked in blood and mud, was something no man could see unmoved, and it haunts me to this day ... I swore, standing there in the rain, that I would bring her murderer to justice.

— Detective Chief Inspector John Capstick

=== Post mortem ===
A subsequent post mortem revealed that June Anne had died of shock due to both extensive internal injuries and multiple skull fractures. The internal injuries were consistent with the child having been raped, and the multiple, extensive fractures and blunt trauma to her skull had been inflicted from the child being repeatedly swung into the boundary wall while her rapist and murderer had held her by her legs, ankles, or feet. (Note: The pathologist who conducted Devaney's autopsy would determine the child's murderer had swung her head against the wall a minimum of four times.) Numerous teeth marks were also notable on her left buttock, two ante-mortem bruises—the pressure of which indicated had been made by the application of a human thumb and forefinger—were located upon each of her upper, inner thighs and neck, and puncture wounds from human fingernails were found upon one ankle. Every injury upon June Anne's body had been inflicted before death.

Considering the area where the body was discovered, plus soon being contacted by a taxi driver who informed police that he had picked up a man with a local accent close to the hospital on the night of the crime, Blackburn Police came to believe early in the investigation that the crime would very likely have been committed by a local person, or an individual with extensive local geographical knowledge.

== Investigation ==
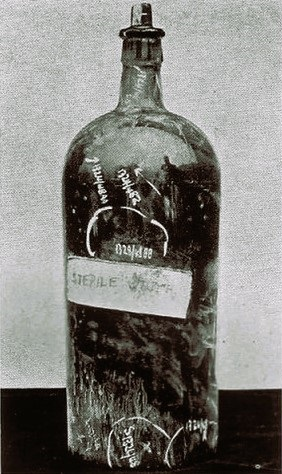
The glass Winchester bottle discovered beside Devaney's cot

Beside Devaney's cot, a glass 1946 Winchester bottle, partially filled with sterile water, was found alongside further footprints—measuring ten-and-a-half inches—which were clearly visible on the highly polished hospital floor; furthermore, the pattern of these stockinged feet impressions evident throughout the ward revealed that June Anne's abductor and murderer had evidently removed his shoes after entering the premises before prowling throughout the ward to view each cot and bed before selecting June Anne's cot as the one from which he chose to abduct his victim. The bottle itself had inexplicably been removed from its customary place (a trolley at the end of the ward) and placed beside the child's cot, and nurse Humphreys was adamant the bottle had been upon the trolley when she had soothed Michael Tattersall before returning him to his cot at approximately 12:30 a.m. This bottle was examined for fingerprints, being found to contain several sets.

After all hospital staff had their fingerprints compared against those upon the bottle, (Note: Initial comparison had begun with all persons with general access to the hospital itself—2,017 persons in all. Of these persons, 642 had specific access to the children's ward. All were checked, and all were eliminated from the inquiry.) a team of detectives from the Lancashire Constabulary traced all individuals who could have had a legitimate reason to have been in Ward CH3 within five years prior to the murder for the purposes of both alibi tracing, and fingerprint comparison. The individuals traced included ambulance drivers, nurses' boyfriends, electricians, and tradesmen. All were eliminated as suspects. Following the completion of this exhaustive task, one unidentified set of fingerprints remained. This set of fingerprints was declared by the head of the Lancashire Fingerprint Bureau to have belonged to the child's murderer. The ridges of this sole remaining set of fingerprints were well-defined and unbroken, suggesting they may belong to a young man with little or no experience of hard labour.

After first establishing that no match for this set of fingerprints could be found within the police fingerprint bureau—indicating the perpetrator had not previously been convicted of any crime—attention turned to every male at or over the age of 16 within the local community. In a joint effort between local police forces and senior detectives from Scotland Yard, the Detective Chief Inspector in charge of the investigation, DCI John Capstick, then proposed that every male at or over the age of 16 who lived or was in the vicinity of Blackburn (then a town of 35,000 homes and 123,000 inhabitants) between 14 and 15 May be fingerprinted. The public were asked to cooperate with police throughout this undertaking, with the promise that all records obtained would not be compared for usage in other cases, and that these records would be destroyed at the completion of this task.

The mass operation began on 23 May, and a special card was developed so that the identifiable sections of the perpetrator's left hand found upon the bottle (the left forefinger, middle finger, ring finger and a section of the left palm) could be recorded swiftly. The card also recorded the individual's name, address, and National Identity Registration Number. Also on the card was a section pertaining to the individual's stated movements between 11 p.m. on 14 May and 2 a.m. on 15 May.

The task-force to carry out this endeavour was led by Inspector William Barton and comprised a team of 20 officers who, armed with details from the Electoral Register, set about the districts collecting fingerprints and comparing them against those upon the Winchester bottle. Over the course of two months, over 40,000 sets of prints were taken from more than 35,000 homes without a match being found. (Note: Such was the level of public outrage generated by the murder of June Anne Devaney, that throughout the duration of this mammoth task, only very seldom did officers encounter a refusal by a member of the public to submit his fingerprints for comparison with those upon the Winchester bottle. On the rare instance a member of the public did refuse to give his fingerprints, this individual was visited by a senior police officer, who in each instance, succeeded in obtaining the individual's fingerprints.)

=== Further fingerprint records ===
By late July, investigators had checked the fingerprints of each individual upon the Electoral Register. Each individual had been eliminated. As World War II had ended just three years previously and ex-servicemen who had left the vicinity, or had recently been discharged from military service, would not have their names upon the Electoral Register, police then concentrated on these individuals. By way of checking the National Registration Number upon the most recently issued ration books against individuals registered at the local Food Office, investigators identified over two hundred men whose fingerprints had not yet been obtained.

== Identification ==
One of the Blackburn addresses to be checked was that of Peter Griffiths, a 22-year-old ex-serviceman who lived at 31 Birley Street, and who worked as a packer on the night shift at a local flour mill. His fingerprints were obtained for comparison on 11 August. When asked to provide his fingerprints, Griffiths—whose niece had been in Queen's Park Hospital at the time June Anne had been abducted—supplied them without hesitation. Shortly after 3 p.m. the following day, a comparison for the fingerprints upon the Winchester bottle was made with the fingerprints obtained from Peter Griffiths. Upon discovering the comparison, the fingerprint expert who discovered this match, Colin Campbell, rose to his feet, shouting, "I've got him! It's here!"

By the time this comparison had been made, officers had taken 46,253 sets of fingerprints, and had less than 200 sets of prints left to check before the completion of their task. Investigators chose to withhold this development from the public until they had arrested Griffiths. A decision was made to discreetly arrest him when he next left his home.

== Arrest ==
Griffiths' mug shot, taken after his August 1948 arrest

Peter Griffiths was arrested by DCI Capstick as he left his Blackburn home to attend work on the evening of 12 August. He was taken to Blackburn Police Headquarters, where he was formally cautioned as to his right to silence. During the ride to police headquarters, and throughout his first interview, Griffiths attempted to deny any involvement, although when confronted with the fact his fingerprints had been a perfect match for those discovered upon the Winchester bottle, he turned towards DCI Capstick and stated: "Well, if they are my fingerprints on the bottle, I'll tell you all about it."

=== Confession ===
In the statement he subsequently gave to detectives, Griffiths claimed that on the night of 14 May, he had chosen to go for a night's "drinking alone" in Blackburn, and that as a result of his heavy drinking, by closing time, he had become severely intoxicated. (Note: Griffiths claimed to have drunk at least 11 pints of bitter, two double shots of rum, and one pint of Guinness on the night he killed June Anne Devaney.) He had then decided to walk around in an attempt to "sober up" before returning home. Griffiths then claimed to have "walked down to Jubilee Street" where he encountered a man in a parked car; he then asked this man to light his (Griffiths') cigarette. According to Griffiths, this man, noting his state of intoxication, had said to him: "Get in, open the window and I'll give you a spin." This man had soon parked his car in close proximity to Queen's Park Hospital, and it had been at this stage at which Griffiths had chosen to break into the premises to commit his crime. (Note: This claim to have been offered a lift by an unknown stranger in a car was called into question by a taxi driver named Bernard Regan who informed investigators that on the night of the murder, he had given a lift to a man matching Griffiths' description, who had specifically requested to be driven to a quarry located adjacent to the Queen's Park Hospital. This taxi driver's account, if correct, suggests the murder of June Anne was premeditated from the outset.)

Griffiths claimed he "remembered being outside" the children's ward, where he found a door unlocked. He had left his shoes outside the ward, and entered the premises, hearing a nurse "humming to herself and banging things, as if she were washing up or something". He had then picked up the Winchester bottle to use as a weapon in the event any member of staff had attempted to challenge him, before he had chosen June Anne as his victim. According to Griffiths, he had "hushed her" as he lifted her from the cot, before discreetly leaving the premises through a window to a small room at the end of Ward CH3 close to the lavatories. (Note: Griffiths had been familiar with the layout of Queen's Park Hospital. As a child, he had spent approximately two years as an in-patient at the hospital in the same wing as Ward CH3.)

Griffiths refused to talk in much detail as to the atrocities he inflicted upon the child, beyond claiming that he had killed June Anne in a fit of rage when she had begun crying after he had carried her from the premises. Nonetheless, in one section of his statement, Griffiths stated that as he had carried the child across the field to where he assaulted and murdered her, June Anne had trustingly placed her arms around his neck. He then claimed to have returned home, sleeping soundly upon the downstairs sofa in order that he did not alert his parents as to his time of arrival home. He had slept until approximately 9 a.m., then "got up, washed and shaved, then pressed my suit because I was going out again after I had had my breakfast."

Although Griffiths did not appear to show any remorse for his actions (which he blamed upon his state of intoxication) throughout the course of his confession, he did end his formal statement with a sentence indicating he wished to be hanged for his crime: "I'm sorry for both parents' sake and I hope I get what I deserve."

Following Griffiths' confession, he was immediately remanded into custody at Walton Gaol to await trial.

== Formal murder charge ==
On the evening of 13 August, Peter Griffiths was formally charged with the murder of June Anne Devaney. Beyond providing investigators with a further set of his fingerprints and foot impressions for additional comparison with those upon the Winchester bottle and upon the floor of the ward of the Queen's Park Hospital, he would refuse to cooperate with all subsequent requests either to discuss aspects of his crime, or to provide blood or pubic hair samples for additional comparison with samples obtained at the crime scene prior to his upcoming trial; simply making statements to the effect of, "I don't wish to say anything" when these requests were made.

To both substantiate Griffiths' confession, and to garner further evidence, investigators went to his house to conduct a thorough search. During this search, a ticket was found from a local pawnbroker, dated 31 May 1948, for a suit belonging to Griffiths. Police collected this suit, only for the police forensics laboratory to discover that it bore bloodstains in several locations on both the jacket and trousers. These bloodstains were found to be the same blood type of June Anne Devaney—type A. Furthermore, fibres from this suit proved to be a perfect match to fibres found upon the child's body, clothing, and the window ledge where her murderer had entered the hospital, thus proving this to have been the suit Griffiths had been wearing on the night of the crime. Fibres from a pair of red and blue socks belonging to Griffiths were also discovered to be a perfect match for those retrieved from the footprints upon the waxed floor of Ward CH3.

== Trial ==
The trial of Peter Griffiths began on 15 October 1948. He was tried before Mr. Justice Oliver at the assize court of Lancaster, and chose to enter a formal plea of not guilty to the charge of murder on this date.

Among those to testify on behalf of the prosecution was Inspector Colin Campbell, who testified as to the prints on the Winchester bottle being a precise match for the samples Griffiths had twice provided for investigators, and which he readily acknowledged were his own. To demonstrate this, enlarged copies of both sets of fingerprints were displayed to the jury, with Inspector Campbell indicating 16 ridge characteristics which were in agreement on both sets of impressions. Inspector Campbell also testified as to the stockinged feet impressions Griffiths had provided for investigators also being remarkably similar in characteristics with those found upon the ward from which June Anne had been abducted. Also to testify on behalf of the prosecution were individuals who described how the suit Griffiths had pawned shortly after the murder was found to be heavily bloodstained in several locations on both the jacket and trousers, and that these bloodstains were of the same blood type of June Anne Devaney. The jurors were told how fibres from this suit were of a perfect match to fibres found on the child's clothing, body, and on the window ledge where her murderer had evidently entered the hospital. None of these experts were cross-examined by Griffiths' defence counsel.

During the trial, Griffiths' defence counsel openly stated they were not fighting for his freedom, but for his life (murder being a capital offence in the United Kingdom at the time). As Griffiths had already admitted to his crime, all that remained was a question of his sanity, and as such, the defence had entered a plea of not guilty by reason of insanity. This opinion was voiced by Dr. Alaistair Robertson Grant, who stated for the defence that Griffiths was displaying the early signs of schizophrenia (a condition for which he had treated Griffiths' father some thirty years previously when he had been hospitalised with the condition). Dr. Grant stated to the jury that although Griffiths knew what he was doing, he did not realise the criminality of his actions. To refute this testimony, the prosecution produced the medical officer from Walton Gaol, a Dr. F. H. Brisby. Dr. Brisby testified on 18 October as to his observations of Griffiths while he had been held on remand since 14 August. He stated that, based on his observations of Griffiths throughout his incarceration, Griffiths was sane when he had committed the crime.

During the trial, Griffiths described how he had entered the hospital while intoxicated, and had then picked up the Winchester sterile water bottle, which he stated to the Court he had intended to use as a weapon if he was challenged. He also described how he had lifted June Anne Devaney from her cot and then carried her, in his right arm, out of the hospital, down the field to where he had proceeded to beat and rape her, adding that the child had trustingly placed her arms around his neck as he had carried her to this destination. Although he confessed to having swung the child's head into the boundary wall approximately four times, Griffiths made no response when he was specifically asked about the sexual aspect of the assault. (After hearing Griffiths' recollection of the events, Dr. Alaistair Grant privately conceded that Griffiths was of sound mind.)

== Conviction ==
The trial lasted for two days. Following closing arguments delivered by both counsels, the jury retired to consider their verdict, although they would deliberate for just 23 minutes before announcing they had reached their verdict. Peter Griffiths was found guilty of June Anne Devaney's murder. In response to this verdict, Mr. Justice Oliver donned his formal black cap and made the following speech:

Peter Griffiths, this jury has found you guilty of a crime of the most brutal ferocity. I entirely agree with their verdict. The sentence of the Court is that you be taken from this place to a lawful prison and thence to a place of execution, and that you there suffer death by hanging [...] and may the Lord have mercy on your soul.

HM Prison Liverpool. Griffiths was hanged within the grounds of this prison on 19 November 1948.

=== Execution ===
Peter Griffiths did not lodge an appeal against his conviction. He was hanged at HM Prison Liverpool on the morning of 19 November 1948. His body was later buried within the confines of the prison. His executioner was Albert Pierrepoint.

== Aftermath ==
Just weeks prior to the execution of Peter Griffiths, all the fingerprint records obtained from individuals who had been in the vicinity of Blackburn between 14 and 15 May were publicly destroyed in a mass pulping exercise at a local papermill. Several local journalists were present to record the destruction of the records.

In 2003 a decision was made to replace the Queen's Park Hospital and the Blackburn Royal Infirmary with a more modern hospital serving both Blackburn and Burnley. Services at both hospitals were decommissioned in July 2006. The site where the Queen's Park Hospital once stood is now part of the Royal Blackburn Teaching Hospital.

== See also ==
- Capital punishment in the United Kingdom
- Child sexual abuse
- Fingerprint analysis – Biometric identifier
- List of executioners
- List of kidnappings

== Cited works and further reading ==
- Godwin, George (1950). The Trial of Peter Griffiths (The Blackburn Baby Murder). Notable British Trials. London: William Hodge and Company Ltd.
- Evans, Colin (1996). The Casebook of Forensic Detection: How Science Solved 100 of the World's Most Baffling Crimes. New York City: John Wiley & Sons Inc. ISBN 0-471-07650-3.
- Frasier, David K. (2024). Murder Cases of the Twentieth Century: Biographies and Bibliographies of 280 Convicted or Accused Killers. North Carolina: McFarland and Company, Inc. ISBN 978-1-476-60808-2.
- Hall, Angus (1976). Crimes of Horror. London: Hamlyn Publishing. ISBN 978-1-850-51170-0.
- Innes, Brian; Jane Singer (2008). Fingerprints and Impressions. New York City: Routledge. ISBN 978-0-765-68114-0.
- Jeffers, H. Paul (1992). Bloody Business: An Anecdotal History of Scotland Yard. University of Michigan: St. Martins Press. ISBN 978-0-886-87678-4.
- Lane, Bran (1993). "I Hope I Get What I Deserve". Real-Life Crimes (53). London, England: Eaglemoss Publications Ltd. ISSN 1354-9502.
- Lane, Brian (1995). Chronicle of 20th Century Murder. Wiltshire: Select Editions. ISBN 978-0-425-14649-1.
- Lane, Brian (1991). The Murder Guide to Great Britain. London: Robinson Publishing Ltd. ISBN 1-854-87083-1.
- Lloyd, Georgina (1989). The Evil that Men Do: Twenty Man-made Murders. London: Robert Hale Publishers Ltd. ISBN 978-0-709-03530-5.
- Mulvey, Carl (1949). Federal Bureau of Investigation Law Enforcement Bulletin. United States: Generis Publishing. ASIN B0BKZJTC79.
- Thorwald, Jürgen (1965). The Century of the Detective. California: Harcourt, Brace & World. ISBN 978-0-151-16350-2.
- Wilson, Colin (1993). Murder in the 1940s. New York: Carroll & Graf Publishing. ISBN 978-0-881-84962-2.
