= Lists of people who disappeared =

Lists of people of unknown locations and status

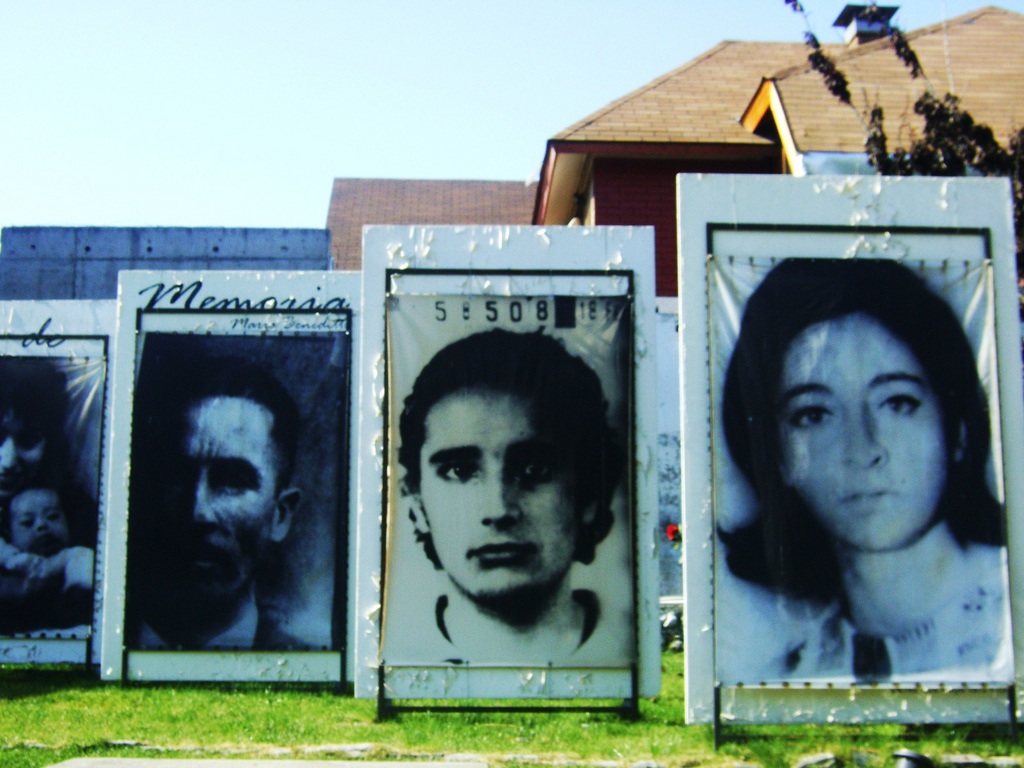
Disappeared people in art at Parque por la Paz at Villa Grimaldi in Santiago de Chile

Lists of people who disappeared include those whose current whereabouts are unknown, or whose deaths are unsubstantiated:

Many people who disappear are eventually declared dead in absentia. Some of these people were possibly subjected to enforced disappearance, but there is insufficient information on their subsequent fates.

== Lists ==
- List of fugitives from justice who disappeared
- List of kidnappings
- List of kidnappings before 1900
- List of kidnappings (1900–1929)
- List of kidnappings (1930–1939)
- List of kidnappings (1940–1949)
- List of kidnappings (1950–1959)
- List of kidnappings (1960–1969)
- List of kidnappings (1970–1979)
- List of kidnappings (1980–1989)
- List of kidnappings (1990–1999)
- List of kidnappings (2000–2009)
- List of kidnappings (2010–2019)
- List of kidnappings (2020–present)
- List of missing ships
- List of missing aircraft
- List of people who disappeared mysteriously at sea
- List of people who disappeared mysteriously (pre-1910)
- List of people who disappeared mysteriously (1910–1970)
- List of people who disappeared mysteriously (1970s)
- List of people who disappeared mysteriously (1980s)
- List of people who disappeared mysteriously (1990s)
- List of people who disappeared mysteriously (2000–present)
- List of solved missing person cases (pre-1950)
- List of solved missing person cases (1950–1969)
- List of solved missing person cases (1970s)
- List of solved missing person cases (1980s)
- List of solved missing person cases (1990s)
- List of solved missing person cases (2000s)
- List of solved missing person cases (2010s)
- List of solved missing person cases (2020s)

== See also ==
- Enforced disappearance
- Extraordinary rendition
- Missing person
