= List of kidnappings (1930–1939) =

The following is a list of kidnappings in the first half of the 20th century, summarizing the events of each case, including instances of celebrity abductions, claimed hoaxes, suspected kidnappings, extradition abductions, and mass kidnappings.

== List ==
Date	Image	Victim(s)	Abductor(s)	Location	Age of victim(s)	Outcome	Notes
14 October 1930		K. J. Ståhlberg	Lapua Movement members	Helsinki, Finland	65	Released	Former President of Finland and his wife who were abducted near their home and taken to Joensuu, from where another group was supposed to take them to the Soviet Union. Because the second group never showed up they were released.
14 October 1930		Ester Ståhlberg	Lapua Movement members	Helsinki, Finland	60	Released	Former President of Finland and his wife who were abducted near their home and taken to Joensuu, from where another group was supposed to take them to the Soviet Union. Because the second group never showed up they were released.
16 October 1931		Anne LeRoi	Winnie Ruth Judd	(United States) Phoenix, Arizona, U.S.	Unknown	Murdered	Winnie Ruth Judd kidnapped and murdered her two friends in what was known as the "Trunk Murders".
16 October 1931		Sarah Samuelson	Winnie Ruth Judd	(United States) Phoenix, Arizona, U.S.	Unknown	Murdered	Winnie Ruth Judd kidnapped and murdered her two friends in what was known as the "Trunk Murders".
14 December 1931		Vera Page	Unknown	Kensington, London, England	10	Murdered	Page was abducted, raped and strangled by an unidentified man in December 1931. The only suspect, Percy Rush, was never charged due to lack of evidence, and the case remains unsolved.
8 January 1932		Joseph Kahahawai	Grace Fortescue, Thomas Massie, Albert Jones, Edward Lord	Honolulu, Hawaii	22	Murdered	Kahahawai, a Native Hawaiian prizefighter, was accused of raping a white woman named Thalia Massie. After his trial ended in a hung jury, Thalia Massie's mother Grace Fortescue, her husband Thomas Massie, and two family friends abducted Kahahawai and brought him to the Fortescue family home, where they tried to force him to confess before shooting him through the heart. The four abductors were convicted of manslaughter, but their sentence was commuted to one hour in custody by Governor Lawrence M. Judd. In 2006, Kahahawai was posthumously cleared of the rape charge.
1 March 1932		Charles Augustus Lindbergh Jr.	Richard Hauptmann	(United States) East Amwell Township, New Jersey, U.S.	1	Murdered	Charles was the son of American aviator Charles Lindbergh and his wife Anne Morrow Lindbergh. On 1 March, the 20-month-old child was taken from his crib at home in what was called "the crime of the century". Ransom negotiations were unsuccessful, and his remains were found on 12 May. Hauptmann was arrested in September 1934, convicted of the crime on 13 February 1935, sentenced to death, and electrocuted on 3 April 1936. Congress passed the "Lindbergh Law", formally known as "The Federal Kidnapping Act of 1932", on 13 June 1932. The law made kidnapping a federal crime if the victim was taken across state lines.
3 July 1932		Unidentified 4-year-old girl	Robert David Bennett	Carlton North, Melbourne, Australia	4	Released	Bennett, a convicted child molester, enticed a young girl into an empty house he was renovating under the pretext of giving her sweets before raping her. Hoping to conceal his crime when adults came looking for her, he allowed her to leave through the back door but was found out and executed, making him the last person to hang in Australia for a crime other than murder.
2 May 1933		Margaret "Peggy" McMath	Kenneth Buck (convicted); Cyril Buck (acquitted)	(United States) Harwich, Massachusetts, U.S.	10	Released	McMath was kidnapped from her school. Her kidnapper, Kenneth Buck, demanded $250,000 for her release, but later relented to release McMath upon payment of a $60,000 sum. McMath was released on 5 May. Kenneth Buck was later convicted of her kidnapping and extortion and sentenced to 25 years' imprisonment; his brother Cyril was acquitted of the same charges.
25 May 1933		George Wilson Becton	Unknown	(United States) New York City, U.S.	Unknown	Murdered	Becton, a preacher, was kidnapped and murdered.
27 May 1933		Mary McElroy	George McGee, Walter McGee, Clarence Click, and Clarence Stevens	(United States) Kansas City, Missouri, U.S.	25	Released	McElroy, the daughter of City Manager Henry F. McElroy of Kansas City, was kidnapped and held for ransom. She was released unharmed after the ransom was paid. The four kidnappers were later apprehended, convicted at trial, and given life sentences.
22 July 1933		Charles F. Urschel	Machine Gun Kelly	(United States) Oklahoma City, U.S.	34	Released	Urschel, an oil tycoon, was carjacked at gunpoint by gangsters led by George "Machine Gun" Kelly, who drove him to a farmhouse in Paradise, Texas and held him prisoner for a week before releasing him after being paid a $200, 000 ransom. Urschel memorized details about his location and deliberately left forensic evidence at the farmhouse, which enabled the FBI to track down and arrest the kidnappers relatively quickly.
9 November 1933		Brooke Hart	Thomas Harold Thurmond and John M. Holmes	(United States) San Jose, California, U.S.	22	Murdered	Hart, the son of a San Jose, California businessman, was kidnapped. His body was later found. His two alleged kidnappers were arrested and, before trial, lynched by a mob.
17 January 1934		Edward Bremer	Arthur "Doc" Barker	(United States) St. Paul, Minnesota, U.S.	34	Released	Bremer, a bank president, was kidnapped for ransom by the Barker-Karpis gang, and was released on 7 February.
25 April 1934		June Robles	Unknown	(United States) Tucson, Arizona, U.S.	6	Released	Robles was abducted and held for ransom. After negotiations between her parents and her captors, she was found unharmed on a highway after nineteen days in captivity. Only one arrest was made in connection with her abduction.
19 September 1934		Dorothy Ann Distelhurst	Unknown	(United States) East Nashville, Tennessee, U.S.	5	Murdered	Distelhurst disappeared while walking home from school. After media coverage, her parents received multiple ransom notes, but the police were unable to determine their veracity. The child's remains were found on 13 November 1934, buried under a flower bed at the corner of the Davidson County Tuberculosis Hospital. Her killer is unknown.
October 1934		Alice Speed-Stoll	Thomas H. Robinson Jr	(United States) Louisville, Kentucky, U.S.	Unknown	Released	A wife of an oil executive who was kidnapped for ransom.
26 October 1934		Claude Neal	A lynch mob	(United States) Brewton, Alabama, U.S.	23	Murdered	Neal, an African-American farmhand, was accused of raping and killing a white woman named Lola Cannady in Jackson County, Florida. Authorities attempted to protect him from lynching covertly transferring him to a jail in Brewton, Alabama, but Jackson County locals discovered his location, removed him from the jail and took him back to Florida, where a group of six men tortured and castrated him before hanging him to death. His body was then driven to the home of Lola Cannady's father to be disfigured further.
26 November 1934		R.N. Baker	Arthur Gooch, Ambrose Nix	(United States) Paris, Texas, U.S.	Unknown	Released	Police officers Baker and Marks were kidnapped by Gooch and Nix, a pair of criminals who they had tried to apprehend. In the course of the kidnapping Baker was shoved into a glass cabinet by Nix and deeply wounded. The two officers were released by their captors the following day after being driven up to Pushmataha County, Oklahoma. They then notified local law enforcement, who shot and killed Nix and arrested Gooch.
26 November 1934		H.R. Marks	Arthur Gooch, Ambrose Nix	(United States) Paris, Texas, U.S.	Unknown	Released	Police officers Baker and Marks were kidnapped by Gooch and Nix, a pair of criminals who they had tried to apprehend. In the course of the kidnapping Baker was shoved into a glass cabinet by Nix and deeply wounded. The two officers were released by their captors the following day after being driven up to Pushmataha County, Oklahoma. They then notified local law enforcement, who shot and killed Nix and arrested Gooch.
26 December 1935		Tito Minniti	Ethiopians	Degehabur, Somali Region, Ethiopia	25–26	Murdered	Italian pilot Tito Minniti was captured, killed, and allegedly tortured by Ethiopians during the Second Italo-Ethiopian War on 26 December 1935. What happened to Minniti after he was captured varies depending on the source; in one version, Minniti was forced to surrender after running out of ammunition, after which he was tortured, mutilated, and killed by Ethiopian forces. In another version, Minniti was killed by Ethiopian civilians angered by the bombing of their villages.
1936		Lost children of Francoism	Nationalist troops	Spain	Various	Various	Unknown number of children abducted from Republican parents, who were either in jail or had been assassinated by Nationalist troops during the Spanish Civil War. Several children were also victims of child trafficking and forced adoption. Their ultimate fates varied.
12 December 1936		Chiang Kai-shek	Zhang Xueliang	Xi'an, China	49	Released	Chiang Kai-shek, leader of China, was kidnapped by a warlord in an affair known as the Xi'an Incident. He was released.
27 December 1936		Charles Mattson	Unknown	(United States) Tacoma, Washington, U.S.	10	Murdered	Mattson was abducted from his home and held for $28,000. He was found dead in January 1937.
27 December 1936		Lojze Bratuž	Italian fascists	Gorizia, Italy	35	Murdered	Slovene choirmaster and composer who was kidnapped by Italian fascists and forced to drink a fatal mixture of castor oil, gasoline and motor oil. He was unable to recover, and died in a hospital half a month later.
5 January 1937		Mona Tinsley	Frederick Nodder	Newark-on-Trent, Nottinghamshire, England	10	Murdered	Mona Tinsley was lured by her parents' former lodger, Frederick Nodder, while leaving her school. Nodder then took her up to his home in Hayton where he strangled her to death, possibly after molesting her. Nodder was convicted of kidnapping Mona, then tried again, convicted for her murder and sentenced to death after her body was found eight miles from his house.
22 September 1937		Yevgeny Miller	Nikolai Skoblin and NKVD officers	Paris, France	69	Murdered	Miller, an anti-Bolshevik Russian general, was kidnapped by NKVD agents. The NKVD smuggled him back to Moscow, Russia. He was tortured during interrogation and executed by gunshot nineteen months later, in 1939.
25 September 1937		Charles Ross	John Henry Seadlund, James Atwood Gray	(United States) Franklin Park, Illinois, U.S.	72	Murdered	Ross, a wealthy greeting card executive, was held for ransom by criminals John Seadlund and James Gray, who managed to negotiate a ransom payment of $50,000. Two days after receiving the ransom, Seadlund fought with Gray over the money and ended up shooting both Gray and Ross and throwing them into a pit.
9 October 1937		Zhengding Missionary Murders	Japanese Empire soldiers	(Republic of China (1912–1949)) Zhengding County, Republic of China	Various	Murdered	Nine Catholic priests kidnapped and murdered during the Sino-Japanese war by troops of the Japanese Empire.
18 April 1938		Benjamin Farber	John Virga, Demetrius Gula, Joseph Sacoda, and William Jackins	(United States) Brooklyn, U.S.	35	Released	A coal merchant who was kidnapped from outside his home on 18 April 1938; he was held captive for ten hours until a $1,900 ransom had been paid. The four individuals responsible for his kidnapping were later convicted and imprisoned.
28 May 1938		James Bailey Cash Jr.	Franklin Pierce McCall Jr.	(United States) Princeton, Florida, U.S.	5	Murdered	Cash was kidnapped from his own home by Franklin McCall, a former tenant of his parents, on 28 May 1938; he was smothered to death and his body hidden before his kidnapper attempted to obtain a $10,000 ransom for his safe return. McCall confessed to Cash's murder on 7 June. He was executed in the Florida State Prison on 24 February 1939.
24 July 1938		Norman Miller	John Virga, Demetrius Gula, Joseph Sacoda, and William Jackins	(United States) Lower East Side, U.S.	19	Released	Miller was a student who was kidnapped from outside his Brooklyn home on 24 July 1938; he was held captive until a $13,000 ransom had been paid. His kidnappers were later convicted and imprisoned.
20 February 1939		Michael Katz	Charles Mitchell, Sol Schwartz, and Nellie Resnick	(United States) Brooklyn, U.S.	4	Released	Katz was lured from his home to a Coney Island theater in a kidnapping plot; he was held in Resnick's Manhattan home and later released upon payment of a $180 ransom which his kidnappers had demanded in order to pay outstanding gambling debts. His kidnappers were later arrested and convicted.
28 September 1939		Joyce Cox	Unknown	Cardiff, Wales	4	Murdered	Cox was abducted in Cardiff after leaving her aunt's house and found dead the next day by railroad tracks.
