= List of kidnappings (1940–1949) =

The following is a list of kidnappings in the first half of the 20th century, summarizing the events of each case, including instances of celebrity abductions, claimed hoaxes, suspected kidnappings, extradition abductions, and mass kidnappings.

== List ==
Date	Image	Victim(s)	Abductor(s)	Location	Age of victim(s)	Outcome	Notes
1940		Pierre Unik	Nazi Germany	Silesia, Czechoslovakia	31	Escaped (later disappeared)	Pierre Unik was a French surrealist poet, screenwriter and journalist who was captured and became a prisoner of war in World War II, before he escaped.
21 June 1941		Betty McCullough	Unknown	(United States) Silver Creek Falls, Oregon, U.S.	10	Unknown	McCullough was last seen alive leaving her Silver Creek Falls home on 22 June 1941 to obtain water from the family well. She was never heard from again. She is believed to have been abducted by a passing motorist. No trace of her has ever been discovered.
14 September 1942		Helen Lynch	Edward Haight	(United States) Bedford Village, New York, U.S.	8	Murdered	Two sisters abducted and murdered by 16-year-old Edward Haight. Both were murdered and discarded in separate locations near Bedford Village, with the older sister being raped before her murder. Haight was executed for the sisters' murder at Sing Sing Prison on 8 July 1943. He was the youngest person executed via the electric chair in New York history.
14 September 1942		Margaret Lynch	Edward Haight	(United States) Bedford Village, New York, U.S.	7	Murdered	Two sisters abducted and murdered by 16-year-old Edward Haight. Both were murdered and discarded in separate locations near Bedford Village, with the older sister being raped before her murder. Haight was executed for the sisters' murder at Sing Sing Prison on 8 July 1943. He was the youngest person executed via the electric chair in New York history.
1 March 1943		Julius Hirsch	Nazi Party	(Nazi Germany) Auschwitz-Birkenau, German-occupied Poland	50	Murdered	A Jewish German Olympian international footballer who was executed at Auschwitz concentration camp during the Holocaust. Hirsch was deported from Karlsruhe, Germany, to Auschwitz on 1 March 1943; he is believed to have died in 1945.
27 September 1943		Norma Cossetto	Yugoslav communists	Visinada, Italy (present day Croatia)	23	Murdered	Istrian Italian student and alleged Fascist sympathizer who was detained by Yugoslav communists after allegedly refusing to join the resistance. Over the next few days, while the German forces were invading the area, Cossetto was repeatedly raped and tortured by her captors, before they finally threw her and two other women in a foiba on 4 to 5 October.
1944		Berthold Jacob	Gestapo	Lisbon, Portugal	45	Died in hospital	The German pacifist journalist was kidnapped by the Gestapo in Lisbon and later died in Berlin on 26 February 1944.
3 January 1944		Pappy Boyington	Imperial Japanese Navy	Pacific Ocean	31	Released	Boyington, an American combat pilot, was shot down into the Pacific Ocean in January 1944 while serving as a United States Marine Corps fighter ace during World War II. He was captured by the crew of Japanese submarine I-181 and held as a prisoner of war until August 29, 1945, shortly after the surrender of Japan. Boyington returned to the U.S. at Naval Air Station Alameda on September 12, 1945.
26 April 1944		Heinrich Kreipe	Special Operations Executive, Cretan resistance members	Crete, Greece	48	Released	On the night of 26 April 1944, Heinrich Kreipe, the commander of the 22nd Air Landing Division, was ambushed while en route from his residence to his divisional headquarters in Crete, as part of an operation jointly executed by the British Special Operations Executive and members of the Cretan resistance. Heinrich was released from British captivity in 1947.
29 April 1944		Lena Baker	Ernest Knight	(United States) Cuthbert, Georgia, U.S.	43	Escaped (later judicially executed)	Baker, a black woman, was a victim of sexual abuse by her white employer Knight, who regularly held her captive overnight. Baker was repeatedly threatened by townsfolk to end the "relationship", but on 29 April Knight forcibly took her to his mill, where he beat and raped her. Baker managed to escape and shot Knight dead; she was later executed for murdering Knight, but the verdict was overturned posthumously in 2005.
9 June 1944		Helmut Kämpfe	Georges Guingouin Brigade	(Nazi Germany) Saint-Léonard-de-Noblat, German-occupied France	34	Murdered	Waffen SS Sturmbannführer who was taken prisoner by a Maquis unit under the command of Georges Guingouin while heading anti-resistance activities in southern France. The day after his abduction, Kämpfe was burned alive under Guingouin's orders. SS troops carried out the Oradour-sur-Glane massacre in retaliation.
3 September 1944		Recy Taylor	Herbert Lovett and others	(United States) Abbeville, Alabama, U.S.	25	Released	Taylor, a black woman, was kidnapped at gunpoint by seven white men led by Herbert Lovett who drove her out into the woods and raped her at knifepoint. The attackers were identified, but due to the racism of the time none of them were prosecuted.
11 September 1944		Richard P. Keirn	Nazi Party	(Nazi Germany) Leipzig, Germany	20	Released	A fighter pilot in the United States Air Force. Keirn was taken prisoner in September 1944 after his aircraft was shot down during World War II. He was later repatriated to the United States.
c. 30 September 1944		Ștefan Foriș	PCR paramilitary forces	Romania	52	Released	A Hungarian and Romanian communist journalist who served as general secretary of the Romanian Communist Party (PCR) between December 1940 and April 1944. He was kidnapped by PCR paramilitary forces in September 1944, but released from captivity in January 1945.
10 February 1945		John Heneghan	Japanese army	Manila, Philippines	63	Murdered	An Irish priest who was kidnapped and killed by the Japanese forces in the Battle of Manila in 1945.
October 1945		Cornelia Hermina van Harreveld-Lako	Anti-white terrorists	(Japan) Batavia, Java, Japanese-occupied Indonesia	62	Murdered	The married Dutch couple were kidnapped and murdered while living and working in Java.
October 1945		Jan van Harreveld	Anti-white terrorists	(Japan) Batavia, Java, Japanese-occupied Indonesia	55	Murdered	The married Dutch couple were kidnapped and murdered while living and working in Java.
2 November 1945		Thora Chamberlain	Thomas McMonigle	(United States) Campbell, California, U.S.	14	Murdered	Thora Chamberlain was last seen entering a car with a man wearing a U.S. Navy uniform and medals after accepting an offer to babysit for him. The man was later identified as Thomas McMonigle, who had stolen the uniform and medals to better attract women. He admitted to abducting Chamberlain and killing her after trying to rape her; he told several different stories about what happened, and recanted his confessions before his execution in 1948. Chamberlain's body was never found.
19 December 1945		Oto Iskandar di Nata	"The Black Troop"	Tangerang, Indonesia	48	Murdered	Indonesian politician who was supposedly killed on a beach by a group identifying themselves as 'The Black Troop'. As his body was then dumped into the sea, it was never located.
7 January 1946		Suzanne Degnan	William Heirens	(United States) Edgewater, Chicago, U.S.	6	Murdered	Suzanne Degnan was taken from her home by a teenage kleptomaniac household intruder who initially insisted he had been unaware a child was in the room he intended to burglarize. Her extensively dismembered remains were found in storm drains around the neighborhood. William Heirens later pled guilty to her murder and to two previous murders of adult women, although his actual guilt has been questioned.
5 July 1946		Doreen Marshall	Neville Heath	Norfolk, England	21	Murdered	Doreen Marshall was abducted from her hotel and made to walk to a place where she was murdered. Her body was found two days later.
29 December 1946		Paddy Brett	Irgun	Mandatory Palestine	Unknown	Released	In retaliation for the judicial flogging of an Irgun member, Irgun squads abducted four British soldiers in Netanya, Rishon LeZion and Tel Aviv and lashed them eighteen times each before letting them go.
29 December 1946		Terence Gillam	Irgun	Mandatory Palestine	Unknown	Released	In retaliation for the judicial flogging of an Irgun member, Irgun squads abducted four British soldiers in Netanya, Rishon LeZion and Tel Aviv and lashed them eighteen times each before letting them go.
29 December 1946		E. Wright	Irgun	Mandatory Palestine	Unknown	Released	In retaliation for the judicial flogging of an Irgun member, Irgun squads abducted four British soldiers in Netanya, Rishon LeZion and Tel Aviv and lashed them eighteen times each before letting them go.
29 December 1946		Gordon Ventham	Irgun	Mandatory Palestine	Unknown	Released	In retaliation for the judicial flogging of an Irgun member, Irgun squads abducted four British soldiers in Netanya, Rishon LeZion and Tel Aviv and lashed them eighteen times each before letting them go.
30 July 1947		Sergeant Clifford Martin	Irgun guerrillas	Mandatory Palestine	19	Murdered	Martin and Paice were both British Army Intelligence Corps non-commissioned officers. Both were murdered by Irgun militants in reprisal for the execution of three of their members by the British Army.
30 July 1947		Sergeant Mervyn Paice	Irgun guerrillas	Mandatory Palestine	20	Murdered	Martin and Paice were both British Army Intelligence Corps non-commissioned officers. Both were murdered by Irgun militants in reprisal for the execution of three of their members by the British Army.
22 January 1948		Alice Meza	Caryl Chessman	(United States) Greater Los Angeles Area, California, U.S.	17	Released	Forced out of a car her boyfriend was driving when they stopped at a red light. The boyfriend drove off, before the kidnapper drove Alice to a secondary location and orally and anally raped her under the threat of killing her boyfriend. Despite reported beatings and torture in interrogation, Caryl Chessman was identified by the Ford Coupe at the scene and by Alice in a lineup. Chessman was executed under the statute of the Federal Kidnapping Act making kidnapping with bodily harm a capital crime.
15 May 1948		June Anne Devaney	Peter Griffiths	Blackburn, England	3	Murdered	Inpatient at Queen's Park Hospital who was abducted, raped and killed by a man who had been to the hospital. The case is considered a milestone in British forensics, being the first case to be solved by mass fingerprinting.
15 June 1948		Florence Sally Horner	Frank La Salle	(United States) Camden, New Jersey, U.S.	11	Rescued	11-year-old Sally Horner was caught shoplifting by convicted child molester La Salle, who convinced her he was an FBI agent and she had to come with him to avoid being arrested. La Salle held Horner captive for 21 months and sexually abused her until he was arrested by the FBI in 1950 after Horner managed to call her sister. The case is thought to have inspired Vladimir Nabokov's controversial novel Lolita.
20 July 1949		Shirley Gretzinger	Ray Dempsey Gardner	(United States) Ogden, Utah, U.S.	17	Murdered	Gretzinger was the second victim of serial killer Ray Gardner, who picked her up under the guise of a babysitting job and drove her to a gulch outside the city limits before making sexual advances on her. When Gretzinger fought back, Gardner suffocated her by stuffing wadded paper down her throat and raped her body.
5 August 1949		Thelma Taylor	Morris Leland	(United States) Portland, Oregon, U.S.	15	Murdered	Thelma Taylor was accosted at a bus stop by Morris Leland, who forced her to a secluded area where he tried to rape her, but stopped when he realized she was a virgin. Leland kept Taylor captive overnight before killing her the following day when she tried to call out for help. Leland was sentenced to death for the murder.
9 August 1949		Sue Ella Horne	Ray Dempsey Gardner	(United States) Beaverhead County, Montana, U.S.	38	Murdered	Horne was the third and final victim of serial killer Ray Dempsey Gardner. She was shot in the head and buried in a field in Beaverhead County, Montana. Her murderer was executed by firing squad in 1951.
October 18, 1949		Dorothy Forstein	Unknown	(United States) Philadelphia, U.S.	40	Unknown	A woman who went missing after being last seen at her Philadelphia home on October 18, 1949.
