= List of kidnappings (1900–1949) =

List of kidnappings (1900–1949) has been divided into:

- List of kidnappings (1900–1929)
- List of kidnappings (1930–1939)
- List of kidnappings (1940–1949)
