= John Bugas =

American business executive

John Stephen Bugas
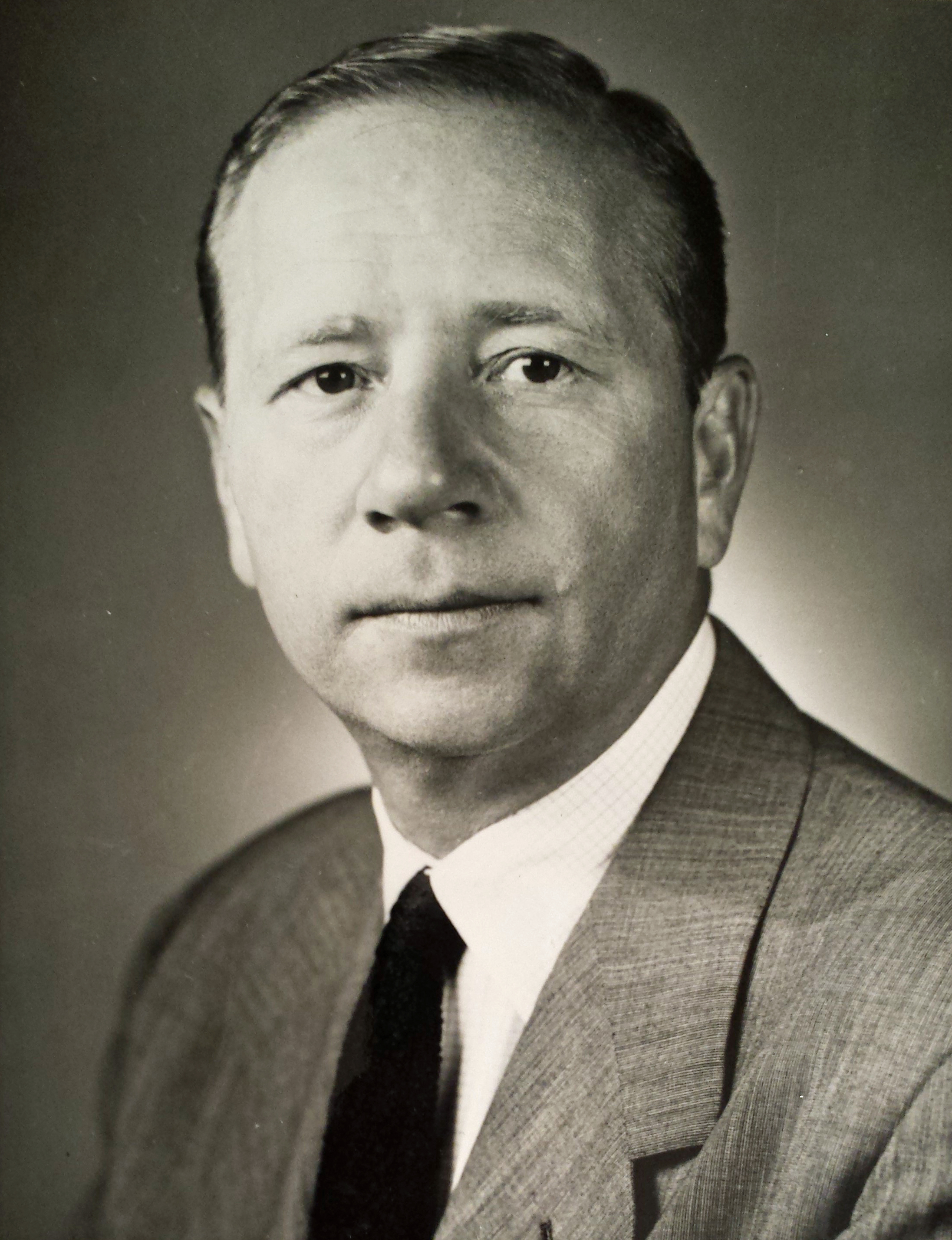
- Born: April 26, 1908; Rock Springs, Wyoming, U.S.
- Died: December 2, 1982 (aged 74); Ann Arbor, Michigan, U.S.
- Education: University of Wyoming
- Occupations: Businessman, cattle rancher, FBI agent
- Political party: Republican
- Spouses: Margaret Stowe McCarty (m. 1938; died 1972); Joan Murphy (m. 1975)
- Children: 4

John Stephen Bugas (April 26, 1908 – December 2, 1982) was the second in command at Ford Motor Company during the presidency and chairmanship reign of Henry Ford II (the oldest grandson of founder Henry Ford). He is best known for taking control of the company away from Harry Bennett so that John could be in command of it—including drawing pistols on each other—following the death of Edsel Ford.

As the Detroit Free Press wrote of Bugas:

When the historians write it down a century from now, they will be dealing with Louis Chevrolet, Walter Chrysler, the Dodge brothers, the Durants, Maxwells and others who put their names on the cars Americans drove or the companies that built them. But they will also have a tale to tell about John Bugas, who in his time had as dramatic a moment as any of them. [Bugas was] a giant of the auto industry and at a time when the industry itself strode around the world in seven-league boots.

== Early life ==
The Bugas family originated from Slovakia. The parents of Jack Bugas, Andrew (Andrej) P. Bugas (born in 1867) and Helena L. Bugas (the name "Bugas" was then spelled "Bugos"), were both born in eastern Slovakia, in the village Lučina near Prešov. Andrew Bugas immigrated to the United States in 1882 (following his father, John P. Bugos, who immigrated in 1878, though died back in Slovakia, at that time part of Austria-Hungary, in 1902) and became a naturalized U.S. citizen at age 26 in 1891.

In 1901, Andrew Bugas was elected to the Wyoming State Legislature (as a Republican) and served six terms until 1907. Andrew and Helena Bugas married in 1902 and from 1903 to 1929 had a total of eight sons and two daughters.

Jack Bugas was born in 1908 in Rock Springs, Wyoming. In 1909, the Bugas family moved to Wamsutter, Wyoming. There, Andrew Bugas opened the first agency for the Continental Oil Company, operated a small hotel and post office, ran a road construction and trucking company, and developed a family ranch he would name the Eagle's Nest.

When Jack Bugas was in his early teens, his father's debts forced the family to mortgage the Eagle's Nest. Bugas worked for years to help retire his father's debts, including quitting school at the age of 16 for two years when his father placed him in charge of a road construction crew—an experience which Bugas would later say was "the hardest and most important in his life" and "what gave him confidence and taught him self-reliance." Bugas later recalled standing with his father outside the Eagle's Nest weeping as they burned the paid-off note.

Bugas had a favorite story about ranch life in Wyoming:

You know, when I was a kid I never wore shoes or ate candy until I was 14. Finally my dad told me he would get me some on his trip to town. So 10 days later, I ran out a mile from the ranch house to meet him and he tossed me a couple of packages. When he found me under the bed at the house, I had chewed half-way through one of the hob-nail boots because I thought it was candy.

Bugas claimed that as a child he would punch cows for entertainment.

Bugas graduated from Laramie High School.

The "tall, rangy" Bugas (at 6'1") was a "star forward" for four years on Willard Witte's University of Wyoming basketball team (including the 1934 national championship team), and was also on the baseball and track & field teams and a member of the Sigma Alpha Epsilon fraternity. He graduated cum laude from college and law school (which he funded by working as a forest ranger, trucker, timekeeper and refinery laborer) in 1934, and went to work for the Federal Bureau of Investigation the following spring.

== Federal Bureau of Investigation ==
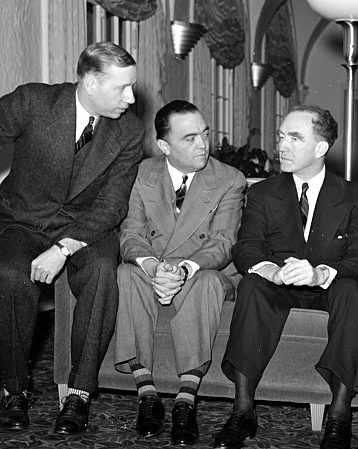
Bugas, FBI Director J. Edgar Hoover, and U.S. Supreme Court Justice Frank Murphy

"Adept at the art of fisticuffs while wearing a suit," Bugas rose quickly through the ranks of the FBI. By 1938 J. Edgar Hoover appointed him head of the FBI's Detroit office, a strategically very important position as at the time Michigan counted "heavily in the national defense plans." According to the FBI, Bugas "oversaw the shift in focus from violent crime to national security. As war loomed in Europe, concern about possible espionage and sabotage attacks on vital American industries like Detroit's automobile manufacturing plants moved to the forefront. Guarding the secrets of American technology and manufacturing were crucial to the war, and the Detroit Division played an important role in protecting these critical assets."

Bugas established a reputation as a "man with unlimited patience and efficiency" in his work on "notorious kidnapping, espionage, bank robbery and other major cases." At the FBI, he most notably led the quashing of two Nazi spy rings (including German Countess Grace Buchanan-Dineen, whom Bugas "turned" to a double agent) and personally captured Public Enemy Number One Tom Robinson at gunpoint. Most of all, Bugas made a notable record when he "kept sabotage in war plants at 0."

Bugas was known in the bureau as "an 'agent's agent-in-charge,' a man all like to work for" ("the highest compliment in the service"), always leading his men personally on important cases.

Bugas and Hoover would remain close friends until Hoover's death in 1972.

== Ford Motor Company ==
In 1944, Jack Bugas left public service to join Ford Motor Company. Henry Ford, still deeply shaken by the Lindbergh kidnapping, hired Bugas away from the FBI to protect his grandchildren, Henry Ford II and his siblings. Bugas began working under head of security Harry Bennett. Some say Bennett (who had originally been hired by Henry Ford to stifle attempts at unionization) targeted hiring the "tough-as-nails former FBI man" in hopes of neutralizing him, as Bugas's 1941 FBI investigation and discovery of theft from Ford's Rouge plant implicated some of Bennett's cronies.

Edsel Ford, Henry Ford's only child, once mentioned to Bugas "how vulnerable he felt his family was to Bennett's machinations." Bugas quickly became an "Edsel loyalist," and with that an enemy of Harry Bennett. Bennett once recalled that Bugas "seemed to sit around most of the day, his jacket off and his gun jutting from the shoulder holster beneath his arm." When Edsel Ford died an early death in 1943 at the age of 49, his widow Eleanor blamed Bennett.

After Edsel's death, Eleanor struggled to get Henry Ford to step down and let Edsel's oldest son Henry Ford II take control of the company, including by threatening to liquidate her and Edsel's Ford stock—almost half of the outstanding shares in the company. But according to Ford II, it was a few allies, most notably Jack Bugas, who ultimately swayed the senior Ford to step aside.

When 28-year-old Ford II was selected by his grandfather in 1945 to succeed him as president of Ford (at that time America's largest private corporation), Bugas was immediately put in charge of taking control of the company from Harry Bennett's entrenched gangster element in management, and of ousting Bennett. When Bugas fired Bennett in his office, Bennett called Bugas a "son of a bitch" and drew a loaded .45 automatic on him (which Bennett kept in his desk drawer, often taking target practice into the wall over a visitor's shoulder). In response, Bugas pulled a .38 from his shoulder holster, exclaiming, "Don't make the mistake of pulling the trigger, because I'll kill you. I won't miss. I'll put one right through your heart, Harry."

Kiplinger Magazine wrote in 1947 that "no one has risen faster in the Ford organization than big, brown-eyed John Bugas." The "practical and energetic man" ultimately became second in command at Ford as "Henry Ford II's closest confidant,". He helped restructure and revitalize the struggling company, which faced considerable financial and strategic challenges transitioning from military manufacturing to a peacetime economy, and by 1956 make it a publicly traded corporation. The Ford initial public offering was the largest and most oversubscribed the United States had ever seen, raising nearly $700 million — roughly $5 billion in today's terms.

Bugas even came to play a role in car design at Ford, most notably of the Cortina (which later became the Corsair). One of the most distinctive features of the Cortina's styling came about because Bugas, as head of Ford's International Division, "demanded circular tail-lights in the Ford tradition" rather than the three-pointed star shape in Charles Thompson's original design. Bugas made the change while Thompson was off ill.

At Ford, Bugas held various vice president titles (among them industrial relations, international import-export group), as well as consulted directly with Henry Ford. Bugas also served as a member of the board of directors starting in 1950.

In 1960, Ford chose a new president, the second in its history that wasn't a member of the Ford family. Surprisingly, Robert McNamara was chosen over Bugas, who "believed he would have little competition in his rise to the top of the company". Bugas never knew that Ford II had discussed the matter of his appointment to the presidency with Goldman Sachs head Sidney Weinberg, who talked Ford II out of it. Bugas nevertheless over the years became one of the top holder of Ford stock options (and with it extreme wealth). In an interview, Bugas claimed to be chauffeured in and drive only Fords and Lincolns, including various Shelby cars.

Although Ford had exclaimed for many years "As long as I'm alive, John Bugas will have a job at Ford Motor Company," in 1968, Bugas resigned suddenly from Ford as a vice president and director. This occurred the same month that Semon "Bunkie" Knudsen was hired as the next president, despite the fact that Bugas was long widely expected to be the successor to the top job.

Bugas took on new directorships in other companies. He moved into an office in the Standard Oil of Indiana Building and worked on oil leases for a partnership he had with Marathon Oil Company and Max Fisher, a Forbes 400 member with whom he had been investing in Wyoming oil wells since the 1950s. Fisher, Bugas, and Henry Ford II "were the closest friends amongst Detroit's business elite," as well as frequent poker adversaries. Bugas also became more deeply involved in the management of his vast Wyoming cattle ranches.

In the major reshuffling of Richard Nixon's cabinet posts in 1973 during the growing Watergate scandal, Bugas narrowly missed being selected by Nixon as Director of the FBI (instead of William Ruckelshaus).

A 1991 book claimed, anecdotally: "As if to illustrate the power of directives at Ford, the company still insists on spelling employee with one final e ['employe'], a practice begun by a directive from John Bugas in the mid 1940s! He is said to have insisted that the spelling of employee conform to current newspaper style," while another story says that his intention was to "save a lot of money in typing and paper costs."

== Wyoming cowboy ==
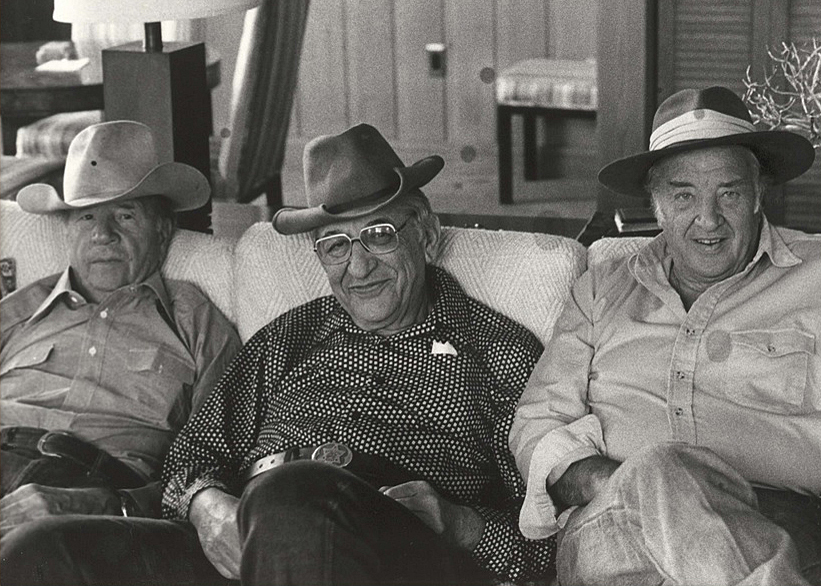
Bugas, Max Fisher, and Henry Ford II at Bugas's Wyoming ranch

Bugas would always retain a love for his home state of Wyoming, saying "Its wide, un-cramped spaces ... give me a feeling of personal freedom I have never felt anywhere else."

Over the years (starting in 1949) he acquired over twenty-thousand-acres in Sunlight Basin ("by far the largest private ownership") and Clark's Fork, within the Absaroka Mountain Range in northwest Wyoming (near what is historically known for being the home of Buffalo Bill). There he owned multiple working cattle ranches, with over 800 head of Hereford cattle, and he would frequently return to his beloved ranches with his wife and children, teaching them to move cattle and enjoy the Wyoming life as he so did. He would spend his time there riding, fishing, and hunting amidst the ranch's twelve-thousand foot mountain peaks, canyons, waterfalls, and rivers. Later in his life, Bugas traveled to his ranches every May and October for the cattle drives.

Bugas's picturesque ranch was used as the filming set for the Marlboro Man cigarette advertisements.

Bugas had a strong belief that his ranchland "ought to have fewer elk and more cattle" (and he put up miles of high fencing to keep migratory elk out of his pastures), and fought for restrictions on private development there ("provided they do not interfere with his cattle ranching activities"). Bugas loved the area because of its "rugged beauty," and was committed to protecting it "against excessive intrusion by man," keeping it "as wild and isolated" as when he bought it. "He would never permit the access roads to be improved or for a bridge to be built, and for much of his life the only way to get to the ranch was by a hand trolley strung across the river." It remained one of the most remote working ranches still in existence in the United States, accessible only by air or horseback, with no conventional roads leading to the ranch.

Bugas's ranch in Sunlight Basin contains the Bugas-Holding site, a notable Late Prehistoric age winter hunting campsite located along Sunlight Creek, a stream in the lower elevations with evidence of bison and mountain sheep hunting.

Author Loren Estleman wrote that Bugas "exhibited a rough frontier charm that might not have been all artifice, helped along by frank dark eyes slanting away from a nose like the prow of an icebreaker and a shy smile that showed no teeth. His pioneer inflections were gentle. Company scuttlebutt said he was embarrassed by stories about his obstreperous past and had taken steps to eradicate the frontier influence from his manner, including speech lessons." ("In an old-style gunfight I'd have picked him as my first target.")

Because of his exploits in fighting the bad guys (while at both the FBI and Ford), Bugas thus "became the consummate hero—legendary to this day"—and earned the reputation as the real life John Wayne, complete with his preferred ascot neckerchief and worn-out hat. (Bugas reportedly would rub a new hat in the dirt, saying "You never want to let anyone see you in a new hat," and then shoot a hole through it with his gun.) His preferred dress was Levis and an old shirt, often a University of Wyoming Cowboy T-shirt, and he had a penchant for singing Wyoming cowboy songs.

Bugas was an expert rider as well as marksman in all sizes of firearms (from his days in the FBI). He was an avid mountain game hunter (including bighorn sheep, mountain goats, and elk on his ranches, and bear and cats in Wyoming and Montana) as well as wingshooter (frequenting partridge, pheasant, and grouse shoots at his ranches and throughout the world).

Described as "stiff and formal" (he favored classical music and "an evening at the theatre"), Bugas was known for his "cowboy morality." He once saw a man on a train verbally abusing a woman and, "grabbing him by the scruff of the neck, Bugas took him out between the swaying cars to chastise him and, when the man swung at him, knocked him down."

Along with this authentic wild west persona came a connection with the game of poker, and media often referenced his "poker-faced" demeanor. The Detroit Free Press described his enthusiasm for poker, and wrote that the secretive former FBI agent and cowboy "admits playing [his cards] close to his vest." Bugas's tough labor negotiations with Walter Reuther have been called a "monumental poker game" in the automobile industry, following Bugas's description of them as "just a helluva poker game."

== Personal life ==
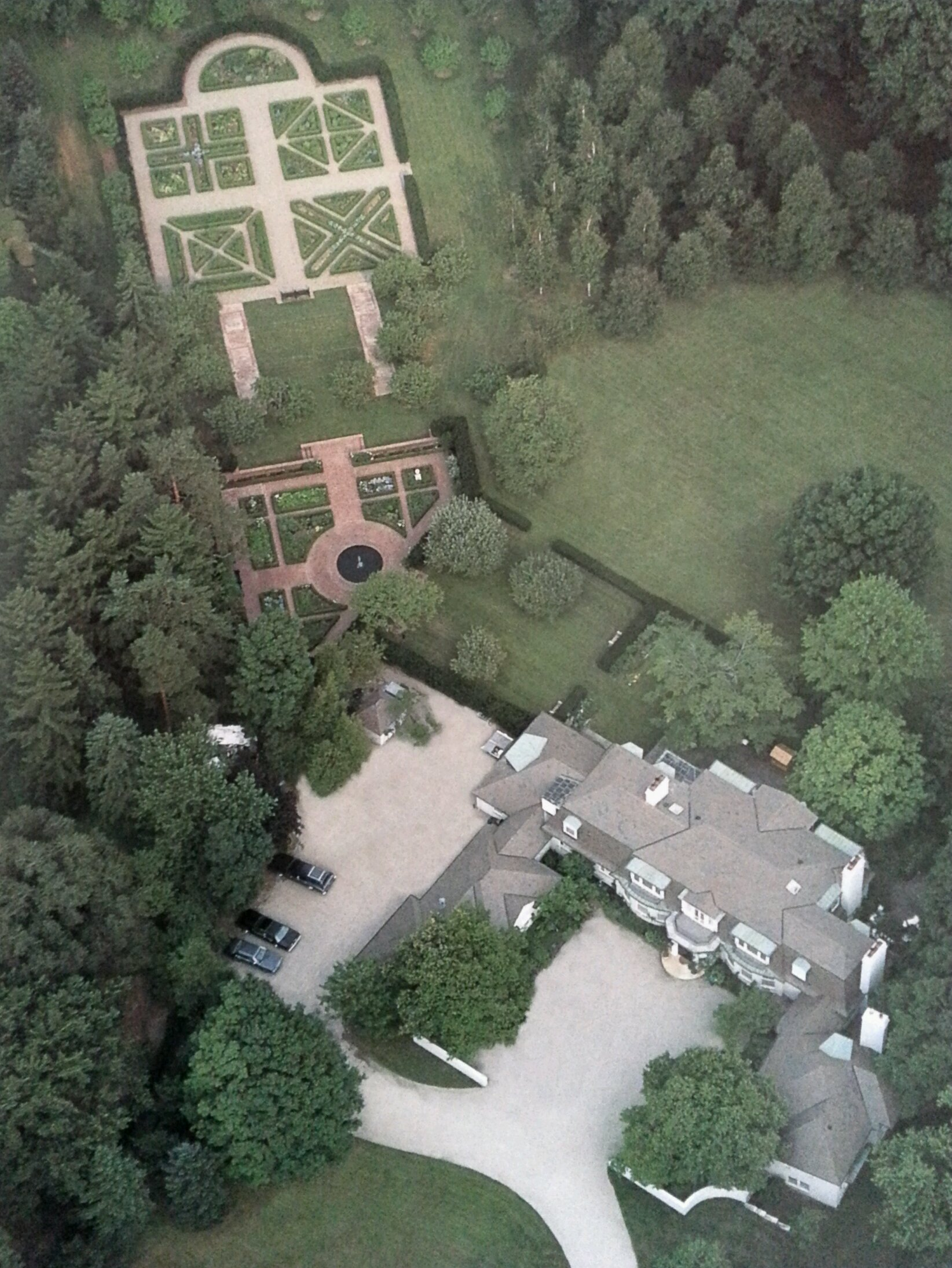
Woodland in Bloomfield Hills Hugh T. Keyes, architect

In addition to his Wyoming ranches, for the last twenty-five years of his life Bugas's main home was his sprawling country estate in Bloomfield Hills, Michigan, which he named Woodland. Woodland was designed by noted architect Hugh T. Keyes, who also designed Bugas's Wyoming lodge, as well as the main homes of Max Fisher, Ford II's brother Benson Ford, Ford President Semon Knudsen, and Ford Chairman and CEO Philip Caldwell. Woodland became the unofficial site for many discreet Ford meetings (as well as discreet poker games), including with Henry Ford, McNamara, Lee Iacocca, Carroll Shelby, and Hoover. It was also the site of large Republican fund-raising parties in 1976 with President Gerald Ford and Vice President Nelson Rockefeller in attendance and in 1980 with presidential candidate Ronald Reagan. Woodland is not unlike the fortified "Castle" compound built by Henry Ford for Bugas's predecessor and nemesis Bennett, where Bugas and his family spent much time. Like Henry's and Edsel's houses, Woodland also had a Ford-built, detached industrial power house serving the main house. Bugas also owned riding stables nearby. (Upon Bugas's death, Woodland was purchased by Max Fisher's close friend and fellow Forbes 400 member Alfred Taubman, and the house was later featured in a Vogue magazine spread.)

Bugas was a significant patron of the University of Wyoming, the Whitney Western Art Museum, and Cranbrook Kingswood, as well as a major Republican Party supporter. He was the recipient of many awards, ranging from Automotive Executive of the Year to the Anti-Defamation League's Human Relations Award ("for a life-time of service in the field of human rights").

Bugas was a practicing Catholic, and was among the "weighty, prominent list" of financial advisors to the church (and had periodic meetings with Pope John XXIII at Vatican City). He was director of the National Conference of Christians and Jews, making many public appearances in support of the conference.

He was married to Margaret Stowe McCarty (a descendant of Harriet Beecher Stowe), with whom he had three daughters and a son, until her death in 1972. In 1975 he married Joan Murphy, a former Ford Agency model twenty-five years his junior (who survived him).

Bugas died in 1982, at the age of 74, at St. Joseph Mercy Hospital a week after undergoing heart bypass surgery.

== Economics and politics ==
Bugas was actively engaged in matters of economics and politics, from endowing a professor of economics at the University of Wyoming to fundraising for the Republican Party—where he was even known to collect money from top Ford executives for the party. Bugas and his wife were frequent guests at White House state dinners of Presidents Nixon and Ford. He also headed up security at Republican National Conventions.

Despite his "erstwhile G-man" life, Bugas, like his boss Henry Ford, was a "thorough-going free enterpriser" and vigorous defender of laissez-faire capitalism and business interests (often against labor interests, as Head of Industrial Relations at Ford).

He became the outspoken industry watchdog to Communist infiltration into the U.S. motor industry, and was quoted as saying, "Communism is bad medicine. There is no room in this country—or in industry—for Communists or Fascists."

Bugas has been embraced by the Austrian School of economics (for reasons unrelated to Bugas's strong Austrian roots) as a rare instance of a prominent historical businessman who "followed in the footsteps" of Austrian economist Ludwig von Mises (in a Mises Institute article John Bugas: G-Man, Ford Executive, Misesian?). Like Mises, Bugas "made the notion of 'consumer sovereignty' a key plank in his economic analysis and defense of the market economy." Bugas "realized that this insight from objective economic science was very useful rhetorically in battling the foes of (what is usually called) capitalism."

Bugas led the fight at Ford in 1949 against Walter Reuther's demands for noncontributory pensions for United Auto Workers members by posing the practical argument that increased costs of production cannot simply be passed on (or "shifted forward") to the consumer in the form of higher prices. (In so doing, he implicitly advanced the Austrian "subjective theory of value", which states that the value of a good is not determined by the cost of labor required to produce that good—the Marxian "labor theory of value"—but rather by the subjective importance the end consumer places on that good.) Bugas explained that, if the employees didn't fund their own pension, the company would have to pay for it by raising car prices, and to think that the company could do this at its whim was a fallacy. He wrote to Reuther: "Old-age security is a highly desirable goal, but it must be paid for. There is no 'kitty' from which Ford can draw." (Reuther cheekily retorted that Ford could find its workers' pensions "from the same source that is used to finance security for high paid executives.")

In a 1955 speech, Bugas notably coined the term "consumerism" as a substitute for "capitalism" to better describe the American economy:

The term "consumerism" would pin the tag where it actually belongs—on Mr. Consumer, the real boss and beneficiary of the American system. It would pull the rug right out from under our unfriendly critics who have blasted away so long and loud at capitalism. Somehow, I just can't picture them shouting: "Down with the consumers!"

Though the term "consumerism" first appeared in 1915, it was Bugas who first adopted it to illustrate the "consumer sovereignty" concept of Mises, "as a means of contrasting the American economy to that of the Soviet Union."

In discussing union demands for guaranteed annual wages, Bugas again invoked his practical business logic:

You may have heard mention of a thing known as GAW, or guaranteed annual wage, which some people claim will be considered. I will just say that we'd be very happy if only somebody would come up with a good plan for GAP, or guaranteed annual profit. The best guarantee possible of continued high and stable employment in any business enterprise is to be guided primarily by sound business considerations in making plans and decisions.
