= Murders of Helen and Margaret Lynch =

Child murder case in New York (1942)

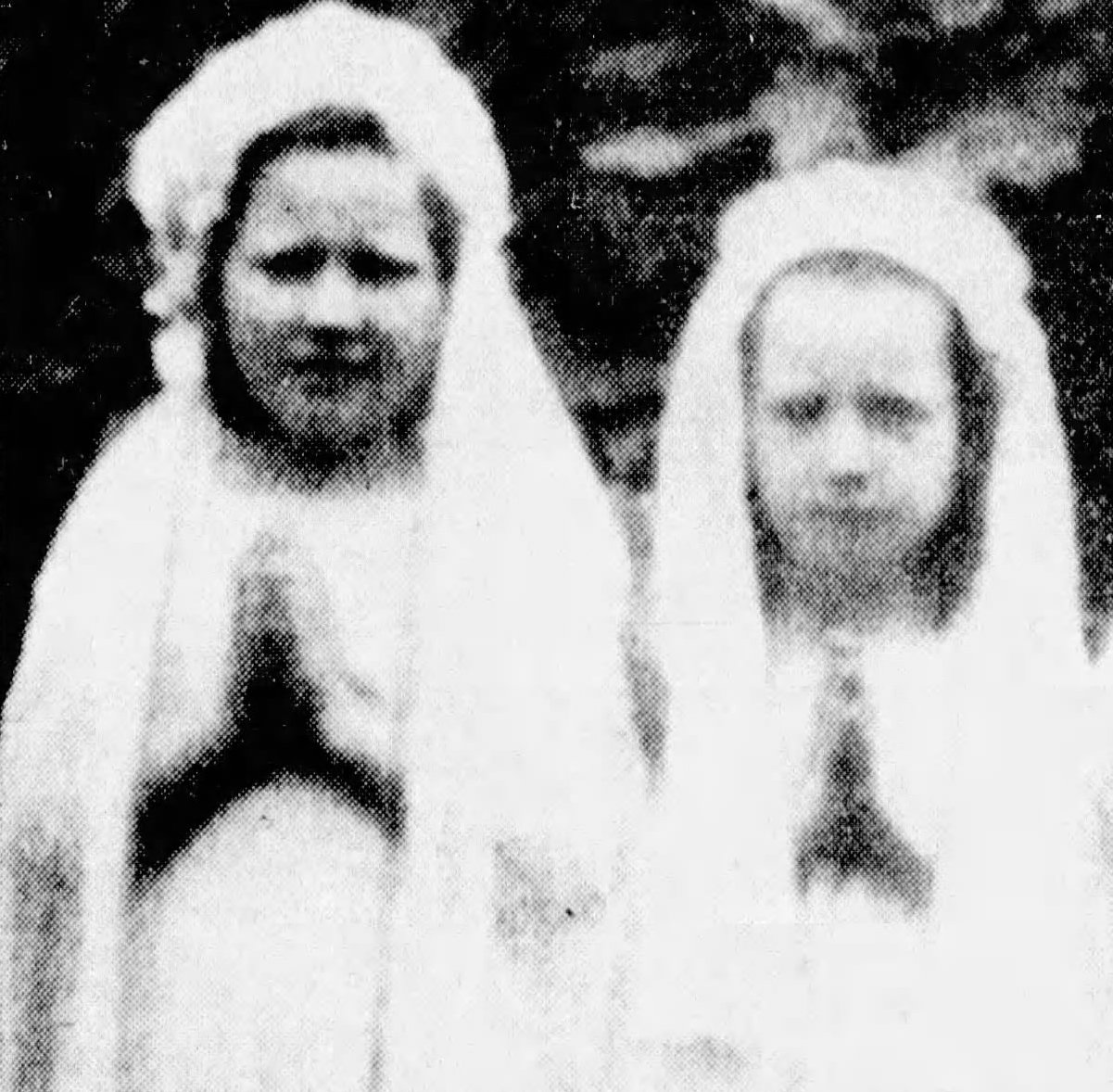
- Helen and Margaret Lynch, photographed at a church procession in Bedford Village shortly before their murders
- Location: Bedford Village, New York, U.S.
- Date: September 14, 1942
- Attack type: Child murder by drowning (Margaret) and running over with a car (Helen)
- Victims: Helen Lynch, 8 Margaret Lynch, 7
- Perpetrators: Edward Haight, 16
- Motive: Sexual assault
- Verdict: Guilty
- Convictions: First degree murder
- Sentence: Death by electrocution

Helen and Margaret Lynch were two sisters from New York, aged eight and seven respectively, who were murdered on September 14, 1942, near Bedford Village, New York. Sixteen-year-old Edward Haight (September 19, 1925 – July 8, 1943) kidnapped the two girls in a stolen car before sexually assaulting, torturing, mutilating, and murdering them both. The case gained national notoriety due to Haight's young age at the time of the crime, the brutality of the murders, and Haight's nonchalant and cavalier disposition during the investigation and trial.

Haight was convicted of both Helen and Margaret Lynch's murders, and he was sentenced to death and executed in New York's electric chair at Sing Sing Prison on July 8, 1943. At 17, he was the youngest convict to be electrocuted in the state of New York.

== Background ==
Helen and Margaret Lynch's father, Patrick, was a salesman employed by the Donald Brush Company. In 1936, shortly after the girls' mother gave birth to their youngest sister Mary, the girls' mother was committed to the Grasslands Hospital, a tuberculosis sanatorium. While Mary stayed with relatives, Helen, Margaret, and their 10-year-old sister Anna lived with their father near Bedford Village.

Prior to the murders, Patrick, Helen, Margaret, and Anna Lynch created a routine wherein, after school let out, the girls would go to town and wait for their father to drive by them in his sedan after he was finished with work, at which point they would join him in his sedan to ride home.

=== Perpetrator ===
Edward Haight was born on September 19, 1925. He was originally from Stamford, Connecticut, which was near Bedford Village. He was described as unpopular with girls and unattractive. His neighbors described him as "dull-witted" and recalled that he enjoyed dressing as a cowboy and carrying a hunting knife in his belt. During his time on death row, a mental examination found that at 17, Haight had a "mental age" of 16 and normal levels of intelligence. Haight had a prior history of mistreating women; when he was 12 years old, he hid a snake in a teacher's desk, and when he was 14 years old, he "hideously mistreated" one of his friends' sisters by kidnapping her, binding her, and driving her around rural roads for an hour as she "screamed with terror" until she fainted.

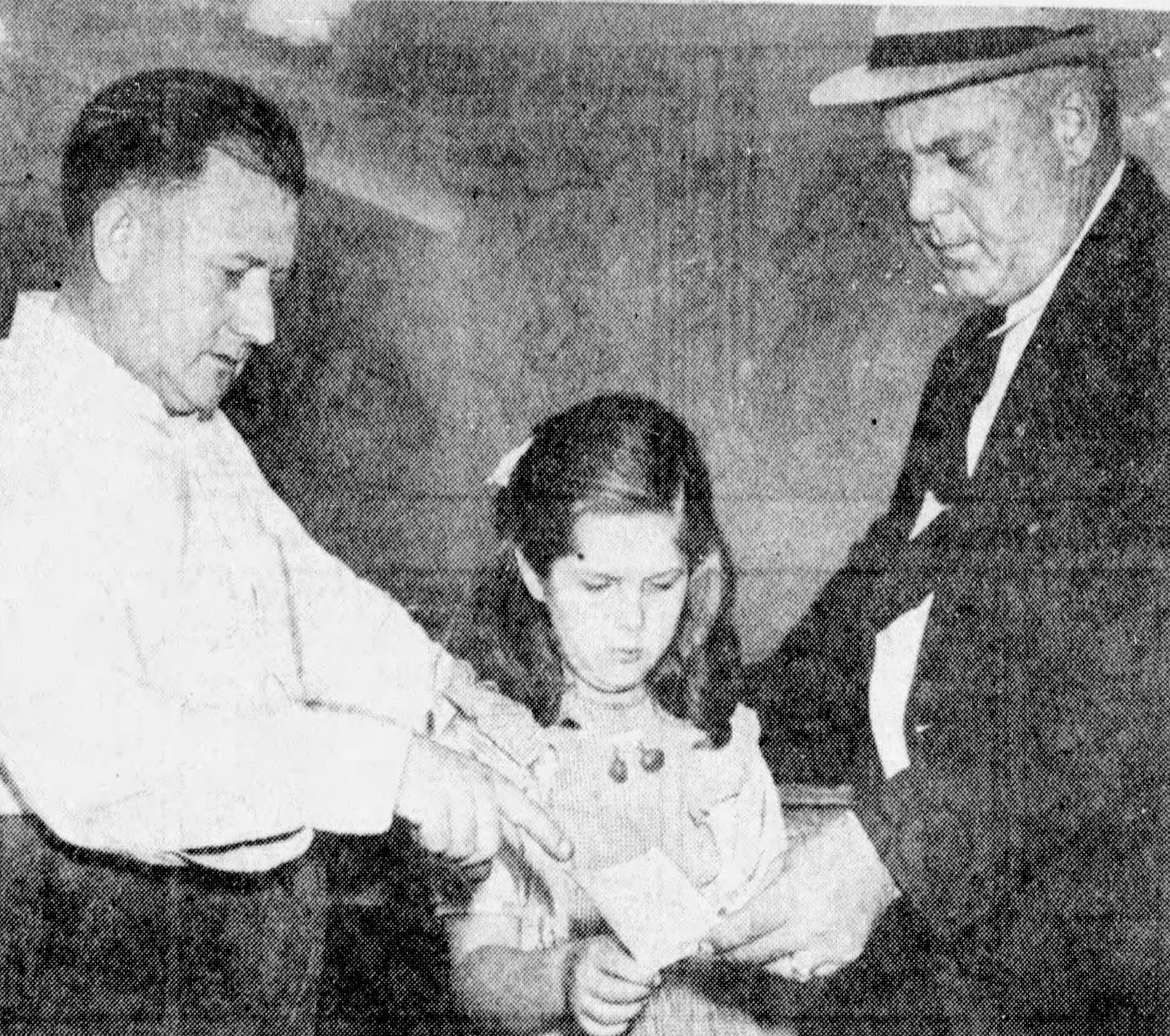
Patrick Lynch and Anna Lynch, showing Bedford Village Police Chief Frank Mallette a photo of one of the murdered girls

Haight had at least three siblings: Arnold Jr., who was two years older than Edward; Preston, who was three years younger; and Charlotte, who was four years younger. Haight's siblings all had criminal records by the time Haight was arrested for the murders of the Lynch sisters. Haight, Arnold Jr., Preston, and Charlotte lived with their mother Georgianna, who was estranged from their father, until May 3, 1939, when their mother died in an accidental house fire.

After the fire, Haight and his siblings lived with their father, Arnold, who had just been paroled from prison. He had a lengthy criminal record, including several burglary charges that resulted in several stints of imprisonment throughout the 1930s. After Arnold was paroled, he built a two-room house for his family, which neighbors described as "little more than a shack".

Haight dropped out of school in the ninth grade; he made money mowing lawns. He was specifically contracted by the city of Stamford to mow the grass at playgrounds and government property.

== Crime ==
=== Abduction and murders ===
On September 14, 1942, Helen and Margaret Lynch waited in the town of Bedford Village for their father to drive by in his sedan. By 6:00 pm, when he had not yet arrived, they walked along a nearby road to search for him.

Prior, near dawn on September 14, 1942, 16-year-old Haight hot-wired and stole a station wagon parked in a stranger's driveway in Stamford. Haight intended to use the station wagon to accost women, and he had a length of cord with him that he planned to use to bind a woman who he could lure into the stolen station wagon. One woman, a kennel operator, was driving to her house when Haight used the station wagon to force her own vehicle off the road. He approached her vehicle, telling her, "I want you," but he was frightened away by a boxer dog in the woman's front seat.

Haight later encountered a 16-year-old girl walking along the side of a rural road near Bedford Hills, and he harassed her, stopping his car next to and in front of her at least five times, while the girl rebuffed and ignored him. Eventually, the girl reached town, and Haight left her alone. A third girl, aged 15, also reported that Haight accosted her that day.

After 6:00 pm, Haight encountered Helen and Margaret Lynch as they walked along the road near Bedford Village. Witnesses observed the girls having a short conversation with Haight before entering his station wagon. After the girls entered the station wagon, Haight bound and gagged them. He drove the girls to an isolated road. There, according to his confession, he tried and failed to rape Margaret, and as she fought him, he mutilated her with a knife and strangled her into unconsciousness.

He then drove both girls to a bridge, where he intended to throw Margaret into a shallow stream. Margaret landed on the nearby pavement, so Haight returned her to the car and drove to a nearby store, where he purchased razor blades that he intended to use to further mutilate Margaret. He then drove the girls back to the bridge and threw Margaret into a stream, this time causing her to drown.

Afterwards, according to his confession, he drove Helen to yet another remote location, this time near Armonk Village, and raped her. He then threw her out of the vehicle and onto the road. He kicked her until her body was oriented with her head next to the wheel of his car. Then he drove the car over her head several times. Afterwards, he drove her body to a separate bridge near the Kensico Reservoir, and threw her body into a large creek.

After the murders, Haight drove to a roadside restaurant in Stamford. He bragged to the waiter about stealing a car and getting in a police chase. After dinner, he drove towards his house but abandoned the stolen station wagon on his way there, choosing to walk the rest of the way. He told police he slept "soundly" after getting home.

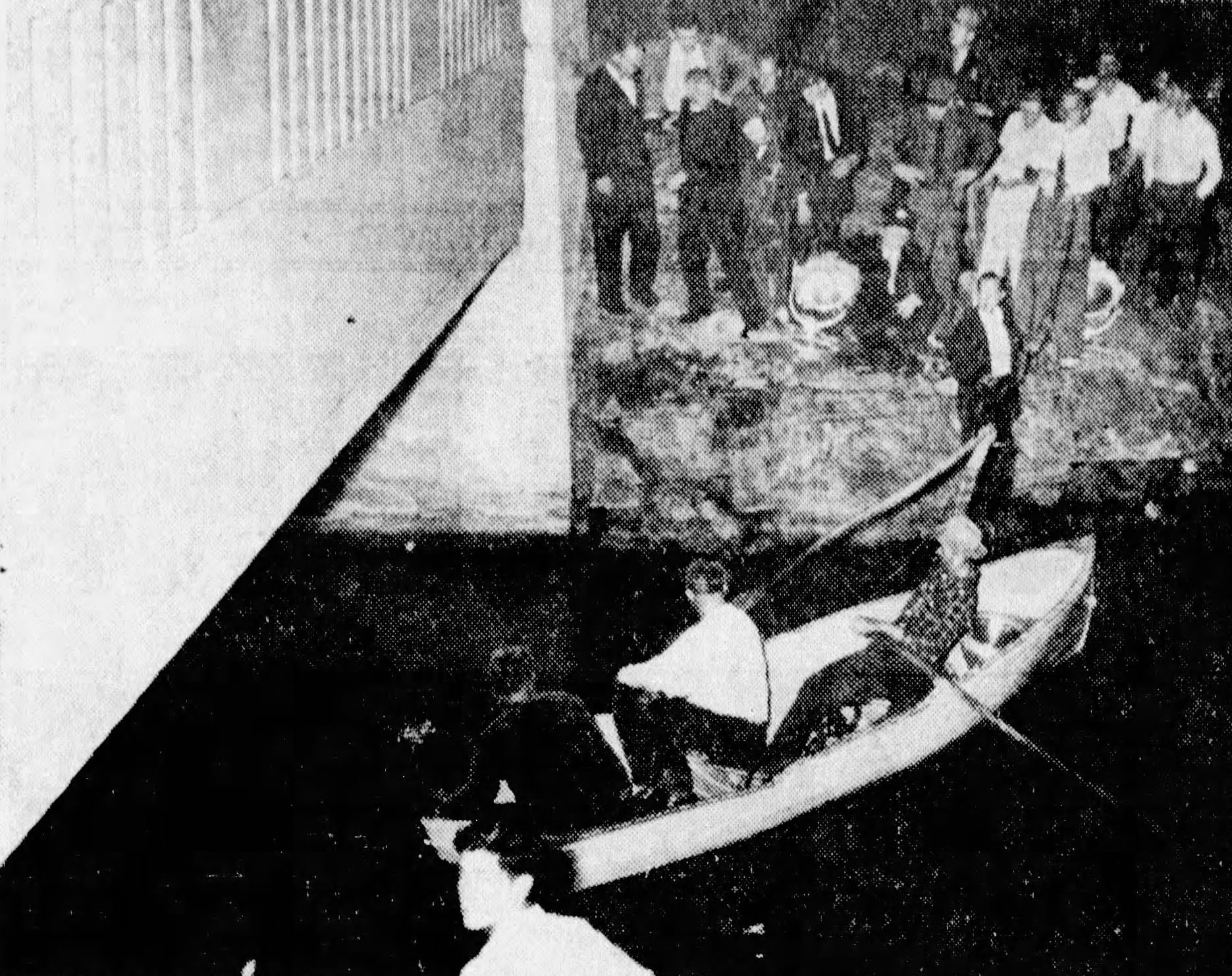
Firemen and police recovering 8-year-old Helen Lynch's dead body from the Kensico Reservoir

=== Search for bodies and arrest ===
Patrick Lynch arrived in Bedford Village to pick up his daughters minutes after Haight lured them into his station wagon. Witnesses told Lynch about seeing the girls climbing into the station wagon, so Lynch reported the girls missing, leading to the police issuing an all-points bulletin for the station wagon. The next day, children stumbled upon Margaret's body in the creek where Haight had thrown her.

Diners who overheard Haight bragging to a waiter about stealing a station wagon offered tips to police implicating Haight in the disappearances of the girls.

Meanwhile, police organized a manhunt that spanned eight states. Within twelve hours of the search beginning, a police investigator acting on a "hunch" went to Haight's home in Stamford, Connecticut, to bring him in for questioning. Haight readily confessed to the abduction, rape, mutilation, and murder of Helen and Margaret Lynch. After Haight's arrest, a reporter asked him why he committed the crimes, to which he replied, "No reason I can think of."

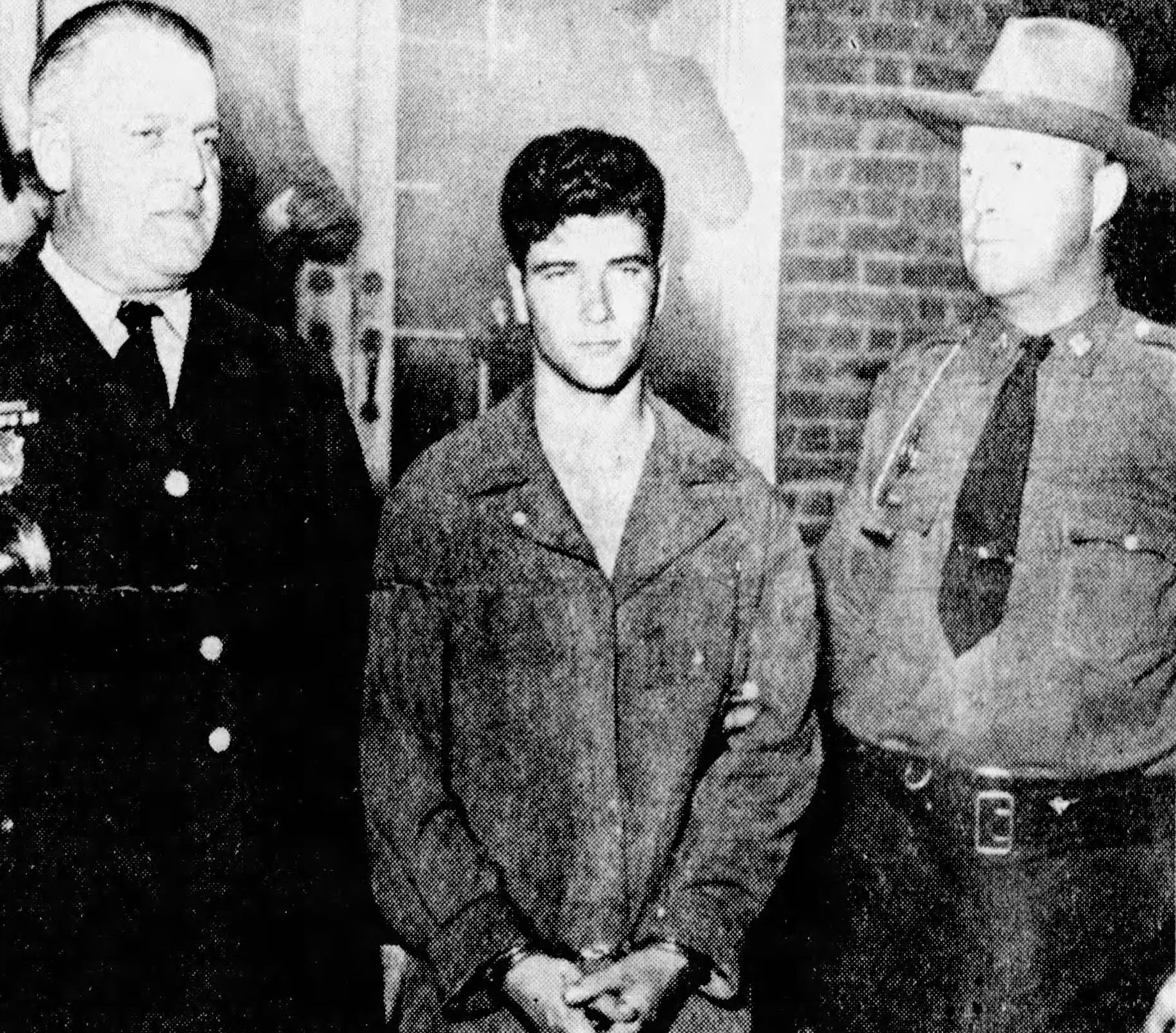
Edward Haight (middle), standing between Bedford Village Police Chief Frank Mallette (left) and Connecticut State Trooper Charles Flanagan (right), shortly after his arrest

Haight reenacted the murders for police while being recorded with a film camera. Police and investigators led Haight through the route he took the previous day as he kidnapped and murdered the Lynch sisters. Reporters noted that Haight "willingly, even cheerfully" cooperated with officials in reenacting the murders and leading them to different crime scenes related to the murders, and that he displayed the temperament of a "schoolboy on an outing".

Haight confessed that he had targeted the sisters because of his rejection by the previous women and teenage girls, in addition to feeling a "sudden urge" coming over him. Crowds gathered at the sites where Haight and the officials would stop, with some crowd members verbally expressing the desire to extrajudicially lynch Haight. After his reenactment and confessions, Haight was booked in the county jail in Eastview without bail.

After the discovery of Margaret's body, fire and police officials used a drag to dredge for Helen's body. Helen's body was discovered on September 16 at 1:00 am, as Haight watched officials recover her body.

== Legal proceedings and trial ==
Westchester County District Attorney Elbert T. Gallagher announced that he would aggressively pursue the death penalty against Haight, stating Haight would have a "swift trip to the electric chair." Gallagher also indicated that Haight would be formally indicted after a grand jury would have a chance to meet on September 29.

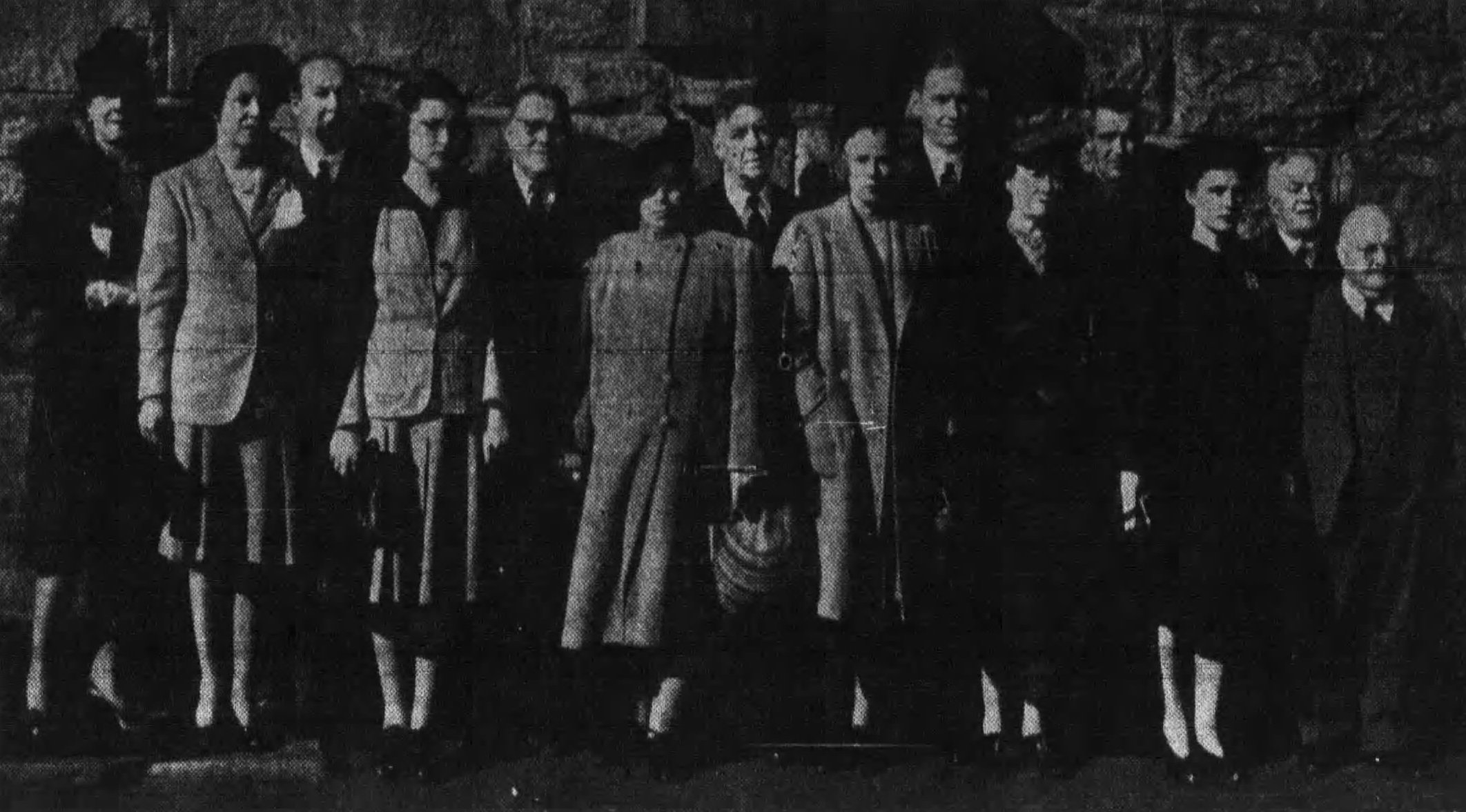
Edward Haight's jury, including alternates

Haight's trial began on October 26, 1942. The venue was in White Plains, New York, in Westchester County. Haight's trial occurred in the courtroom of Judge Frank H. Coyne, himself a former district attorney of Westchester County. His jury consisted of six married mothers and six married fathers, and one male alternate and one female alternate. The jury was selected out of a pool of 101 prospects on October 27.

Haight's attorney, Yonkers-based defense attorney Charles Wallace, attempted to construct an insanity defense for his client, with his evidence including medical records showing that Haight received a head injury when he was six years old. Haight's attorney also accused police of extracting a coerced confession during their initial questioning, and that Haight expressed remorse by crying when officials recovered Helen's body from the reservoir.

Haight's attorney summoned a physician from a psychiatric hospital who had analyzed the defendant. The physician said he believed Haight to be insane based on his mistreatment of girls and women in his past, his antisocial tendencies, and the psychiatrist's opinion that Haight had "beginning dementia praecox with a psychosis mixed type and definite sadistic trends."

Prosecutors countered Haight's insanity defense by making the case that the murder was calculated and planned, and establishing that Haight understood his actions to be wrong; when repeatedly asked if he knew the murders were wrong, Haight replied affirmatively each time. He also testified that he hoped the razors he purchased to mutilate Margaret would help him to construct an alibi, and that he planned to use the razors to amputate the victims' fingers and make them into a bracelet.

Prosecutors called their own psychiatric specialist who stated that Haight was sane at the time of the crimes and had always been sane. Although the specialist conceded Haight may have had a condition called "constitutional psychopathy", the prosecution's specialist stated that Haight met the legal requirements for sanity because, in addition to understanding that his actions were wrong, Haight also understood the consequences for his actions. Haight's second defense, that he expressed remorse during the investigation and had been coerced into making a confession, was undermined when Haight's attorney cross-examined Police Chief Frank R. Mallette, who had overseen Haight's confessions and asserted that Haight was "calm and collected" as he discussed the crimes.

A medical examiner for the prosecution testified that despite the girls' extensive injuries, he believed both girls died by drowning in the respective bodies of water into which Haight had thrown them. The medical examiner stated that he did not believe Haight completed a sexual assault against either of the Lynch sisters. Reporters observed Haight grinning while District Attorney Gallagher presented Haight's confession to the court, particularly when the confession mentioned Haight's assaults against the girls and described, in detail, how the girls died.

On November 6, 1942, Haight's jury returned with a verdict. After deliberating for 96 minutes, the jury found him guilty of first degree murder. Their guilty verdict carried a mandatory death sentence, to be officially handed down on a later date. On November 17, 1942, Haight was formally sentenced to death for both murders. Reporters observed that Haight maintained a smile although he displayed a slight facial twitch as the judge condemned him to die. Haight's execution was initially scheduled to take place the week of December 27, 1942, but the process of reviewing his conviction via appealing postponed the execution for several months beyond the initial date.

== Aftermath ==
On May 27, 1943, the New York Court of Appeals upheld Haight's conviction, overruling his defense of insanity, dismissing claims of technical errors during the trial, and rejecting the notion that he was "mentally incapable of premeditation."

Haight was executed by electrocution on July 8, 1943, in New York's Sing Sing Prison. His execution was scheduled to take place on the same evening as two others, those of 19-year-old Benitez DeJesus and 18-year-old William Diaz, who were convicted of the murder and robbery of a man named Edwin Berkowitz. Haight's execution was the second to take place that night, with DeJesus being executed first and Diaz being executed last.

Haight entered the death chamber with the prison's Protestant chaplain at 11:06 pm, two minutes after the completion of DeJesus's execution, and was described as calm and unbothered, with a smile on his face. Haight was pronounced dead four minutes later.

Shortly before his execution, although Haight was reportedly stoic and calm, he told prison workers, "I was a fool. I guess this is my last day, and I am only 17. I don't know why I did what I did." Haight's execution made him the youngest person to ever be executed in New York's electric chair.

== See also ==
- Capital punishment in New York
- List of people executed in New York
- List of people executed in the United States in 1943
- List of kidnappings (1940–1949)
