= Stoll kidnapping =

1934 crime in Louisville, Kentucky

- Date: October 10, 1934
- Location: Louisville, Kentucky
- Motive: Ransom
- Perpetrators: Thomas H. Robinson, Jr.
- Missing: Alice Speed Stoll
- Charges: Kidnapping

The Stoll kidnapping was a 1934 crime in Louisville, Kentucky, that made the front page of national newspapers and magazines as an FBI investigation under the Federal Kidnapping Act. Alice Speed Stoll, wife of oil company executive Berry V. Stoll and granddaughter of businessman James Breckenridge Speed, was kidnapped on October 10, 1934, and held in Indianapolis for a $50,000 ransom by Thomas H. Robinson Jr. In 2016, Louisville Magazine writer Brian Hunt called the Stoll kidnapping "Louisville's crime of the century".

While the kidnapper's wife was apprehended by the FBI almost immediately, Robinson was not arrested until May 11, 1936, when he was taken at gunpoint in Glendale, California, by FBI agents including John Bugas. Robinson was convicted, served time in prison, was retried and sentenced to death, had his death sentence commuted by President Harry S. Truman, and escaped prison multiple times before he was finally released in 1970.

== See also ==
- List of kidnappings (1900–1949)
