= Burnley General Teaching Hospital =

- East Lancashire Hospitals NHS Trust
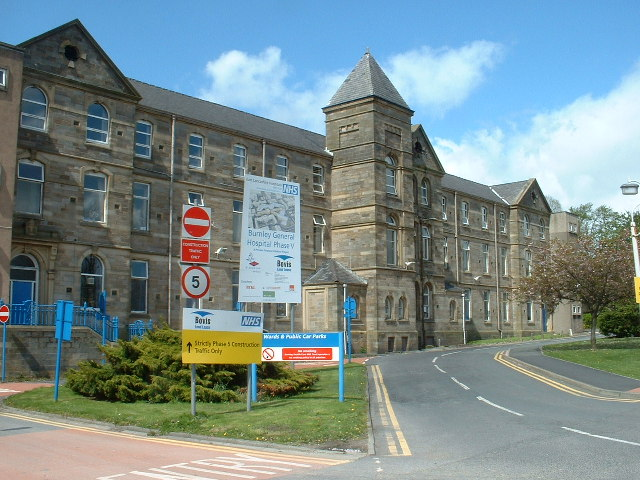
- Burnley General Teaching Hospital

- Location in Burnley Location in Lancashire

Geography
- Location: Burnley, Lancashire, England
- Coordinates: 53.80793°N 2.22547°W

Organisation
- Care system: NHS

History
- Founded: 1876

Links
- Website: www.elht.nhs.uk
- Lists: Hospitals in England

The Burnley General Teaching Hospital is an acute District General Hospital in Burnley, Lancashire operated by the East Lancashire Hospitals NHS Trust.

== History ==
The original hospital on the site was established as an infirmary for the local workhouse in March 1876. A new infirmary was built on the site, slightly north of the old one, in 1895. It became known as Primrose Bank Hospital in the 1930s and as Burnley General Hospital on the formation of the National Health Service in 1948.

A hospital extension was procured under a Private Finance Initiative contract in 2004 to create extra wards, a renal dialysis unit, an out-patients department and a dedicated rehabilitation suite. It was built by Bovis Lend Lease at a cost of £30 million and it opened in 2006.
