= George Wilson Becton =

- Born: Clarksville, Texas
- Died: 1933; New York City
- Occupation: preacher

George Wilson Becton was an American preacher who was considered the "first of the colorful cult leaders in Harlem." He began charismatic preaching in about 1930, after the decline of Marcus Garvey, and continued until he was mysteriously murdered in 1933.

Becton was born in Clarksville, Texas. Becton's sermons were formal and presented in a dignified setting, with orchestral music and liveried pages. He was kidnapped and shot to death on May 25, 1933. He died without describing his attackers or explaining why anybody might have wanted him killed.

Claude McKay wrote about Becton in his book Harlem, Negro Metropolis.

== See also ==
- List of kidnappings (1900–1949)
- List of unsolved murders (1900–1979)
