= Cornelia Hermina van Harreveld-Lako =

Dutch botanist (1883–1945)

- Born: 1883; Wageningen, Netherlands
- Died: 21 November 1945 (aged 61–62); Batavia, Java
- Education: Utrecht University, University of Amsterdam
- Known for: Botanical collecting in the Dutch East Indies
- Scientific career
- Fields: Botany, pharmacy, agrogeology
- Thesis: Water cultures with clay suspensions and with nutrient solutions (1933)

Cornelia Hermina van Harreveld-Lako (1883–1945) was a Dutch botanist who collected specimens in Indonesia. She lived there and collected botanical samples for more than ten years before she was murdered by extremists after being taken from her home with her husband in Batavia, Java.

== Biography ==
Cornelia was born in 1883 in Wageningen, Gelderland, Holland.

She studied pharmacy at Utrecht University, and she worked for six years in Holland, including as Chemical Assistant at the Experiment Station for the Java Sugar Industry (Pasuruan) 1913–1915, and Agrogeologist at the same institution 1915–1927. After returning to Holland, she completed her PhD degree in mathematics and physics at the University of Amsterdam on 27 September 1933. Her thesis was titled, Water cultures with clay suspensions and with nutrient solutions, supervised by Prof. Dr. Th. Weevers. Shortly thereafter, in 1934, she moved to Batavia, Indonesia, with her husband, lawyer and botanical collector Jan van Harreveld (1890–1945).

She is known to have conducted collecting expeditions in East Java over several years including 1913 (multiple times in G. Tengger), 1915, and 1926.

== Death ==
In October 1945, during the Bersiap, Cornelia and Jan were forcibly taken from their home on the Oude Tamarindelaan by terrorists and tortured and murdered along with other white residents of the area. The kidnapped victims were killed in kampong Bali near Tanah Abang Heuvel and buried there. The perpetrators were eventually captured and the couple's remains were discovered and reburied in the Field of Honour for civilian victims in Batavia. A photo report of the reburial can be found in the image bank of the National Archives (Photo collection Dienst Legercontacten, 2.24.04.03, series 79.)

Cornelia and Jan are each interred at the Dutch War Cemetery Menteng Pulo in Jakarta. According to cemetery records, both were murdered on 21 November 1945.

== Selected publications ==
- van Harreveld-Lako, Cornelia Hermina. "Adansonia digitata L., de baobab of apenbroodboom." De Tropische Natuur 15, no. 10 (1926): 157-162.
- van Harreveld-Lako, Cornelia Hermina. "The properties of sugar cane soils of Java." (1932): Book.
- van Harreveld-Lako, Cornelia Hermina. "Water-cultures with clay suspensions and with nutrient solutions." Recueil des travaux botaniques néerlandais 31, no. 1/2 (1934): 27-112.
- Harreveld, C.H. De eigenschappen van de suikerrietgronden op Java.

== See also ==
- List of kidnappings: 1950–1979
