= Pendle Community Hospital =

- East Lancashire Hospitals NHS Trust
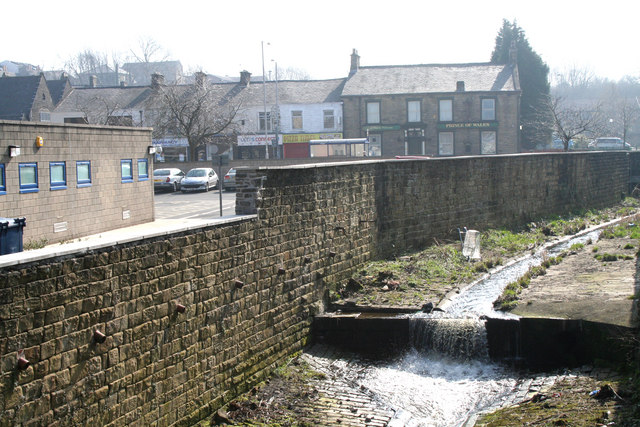
- The Goit in Nelson with the community hospital on the left

- Shown in Lancashire

Geography
- Location: Nelson, Lancashire, England, United Kingdom
- Coordinates: 53.8388°N 2.2113°W

Organisation
- Care system: NHS
- Type: Community

History
- Founded: 1987

Links
- Lists: Hospitals in England

Pendle Community Hospital is a community hospital in Nelson, Lancashire. It is managed by East Lancashire Hospitals NHS Trust.

== History ==
The Pendle Community Hospital was established to replace the Reedyford Hospital which had been created by the conversion of a 19th century private house into a war memorial hospital in 1914. Services were transferred to the newly built Pendle Community Hospital in 1987.

In March 2012, after 20 beds were removed from the community hospital, there were fears that it would close.
