= Rossendale General Hospital =

Former hospital in Lancashire, England

- East Lancashire Hospitals NHS Trust
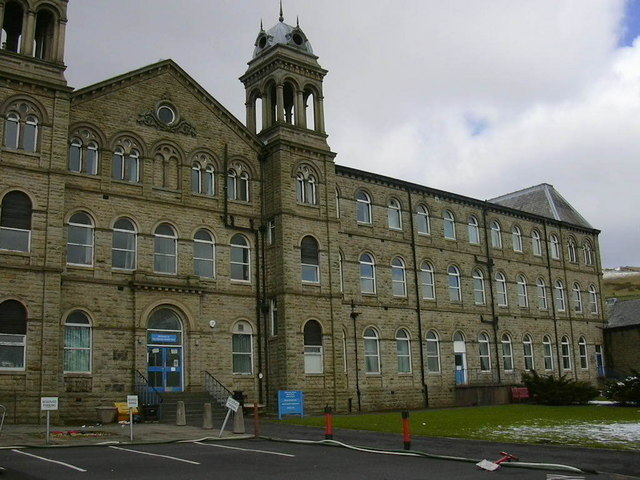
- The former workhouse building at Rossendale General Hospital in 2008

- Shown in Lancashire

Geography
- Location: Rawtenstall, Lancashire, England
- Coordinates: 53.6981°N 2.3097°W

Organisation
- Care system: NHS
- Type: General

History
- Founded: 1912
- Closed: 2010

Links
- Lists: Hospitals in England

Rossendale General Hospital was an acute general hospital at Rawtenstall in Rossendale, Lancashire, England. It was managed by the East Lancashire Hospitals NHS Trust.

== History ==
The hospital has its origins in an infirmary established to support Haslingden Workhouse in 1912. This infirmary was initially known as the Moorlands Infirmary and, after it had taken over the old workhouse, it became Moorlands Public Assistance Infirmary in 1945. It was renamed Rossendale General Hospital on joining the National Health Service (NHS) in 1948. After services moved to the new Rossendale Primary Healthcare Centre, the hospital closed in September 2010. The workhouse and infirmary buildings were all demolished in late 2013 and the site was subsequently developed by Taylor Wimpey for residential use.
