= Blackburn Royal Infirmary =

- East Lancashire Hospitals NHS Trust
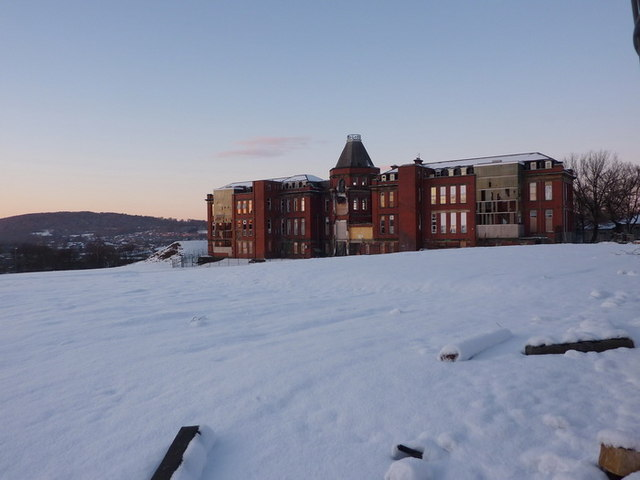
- The War Memorial Wing (2010)

- Shown in Lancashire

Geography
- Location: Blackburn, Lancashire, United Kingdom
- Coordinates: 53.73614°N 2.48886°W

Organisation
- Care system: Public NHS
- Type: Acute

History
- Founded: May 1858
- Closed: July 2006

Links
- Lists: Hospitals in the United Kingdom

The Blackburn Royal Infirmary was an acute District General Hospital in Blackburn, Lancashire. It was managed by East Lancashire Hospitals NHS Trust.

== History ==
Although the foundation stone was laid on 24 May 1858, because of the depressed state of the local cotton industry, the Blackburn Infirmary did not open until 1864. The Victoria Wing was added to commemorate the diamond jubilee of Queen Victoria in 1897. The facility became known as the Blackburn and East Lancashire Royal Infirmary from 1914.

A War Memorial Wing, built to commemorate soldiers who died in the First World War, would not have been completed but for a large donation from Elma Yerburgh, Chairman of Thwaites Brewery: the wing opened in June 1928. Further extensions were completed in 1965 and 1980.

As part of a plan to rationalise acute and tertiary healthcare in the local area, most of the services transferred to the Royal Blackburn Teaching Hospital in July 2006, and the infirmary site was sold to Barratt Developments. The War Memorial Wing was demolished in February 2015.
