= Royal Blackburn Teaching Hospital =

- East Lancashire Hospitals NHS Trust
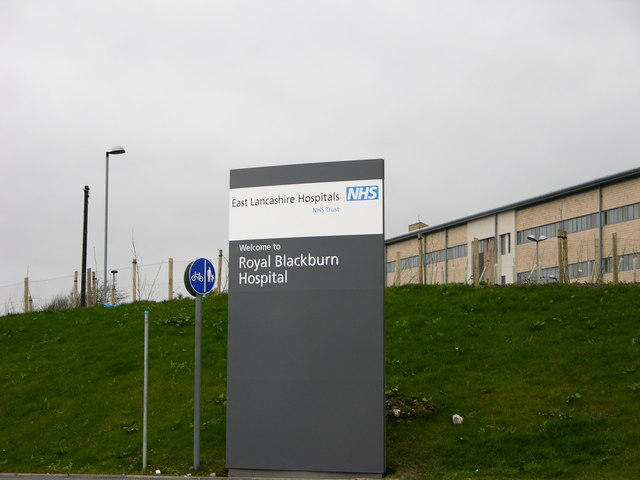
- Royal Blackburn Teaching Hospital

- Location in Blackburn Location in Lancashire

Geography
- Location: Blackburn, Lancashire, England
- Coordinates: 53.73536°N 2.46198°W

Organisation
- Care system: NHS

Services
- Emergency department: Yes
- Beds: 709

History
- Founded: 2006

Links
- Website: elht.nhs.uk/your-visit/our-hospitals-and-locations/royal-blackburn-teaching-hospital
- Lists: Hospitals in England

The Royal Blackburn Teaching Hospital is an acute District General Hospital in Blackburn, Lancashire operated by the East Lancashire Hospitals NHS Trust.

== History ==
The original hospital on the site was established as an infirmary for the local workhouse in February 1864. Additions included a medical wing in 1903, a children's wing in 1925 and a 74-bed annexe in 1926. In 1929 it became known as the Queen's Park Institution, a name which evolved to become the Queen's Park Hospital.

A new hospital, to be known as the Royal Blackburn Teaching Hospital, was procured under a Private Finance Initiative contract in 2003 to replace the Queen's Park Hospital and the Blackburn Royal Infirmary. It was built by Balfour Beatty at a cost of £133 million and opened in July 2006.

In 2019 the government gave approval for a £10 million "care village" to be constructed on the existing site, providing an additional 31 accident and emergency beds.

== Controversies ==
In June of 2025, it was reported that a patient at the hospital's Emergency Department had died after doctors failed to review an x-ray for 12 hours. An inquest returned a narrative conclusion that stated that the delay in receiving care contributed to the patient's death. East Lancashire Hospitals NHS Trust's medical director apologized following the incident, calling it a "tragic event".
