= Zhengding Missionary Murder =

1937 kidnapping and murder of nine Catholic priests in Hebei, Republic-era China

The Zhengding Missionary Murder is an incident in which nine Catholic priests were kidnapped and killed in Zhengding, Hebei province, Republic-era China on October 9, 1937.

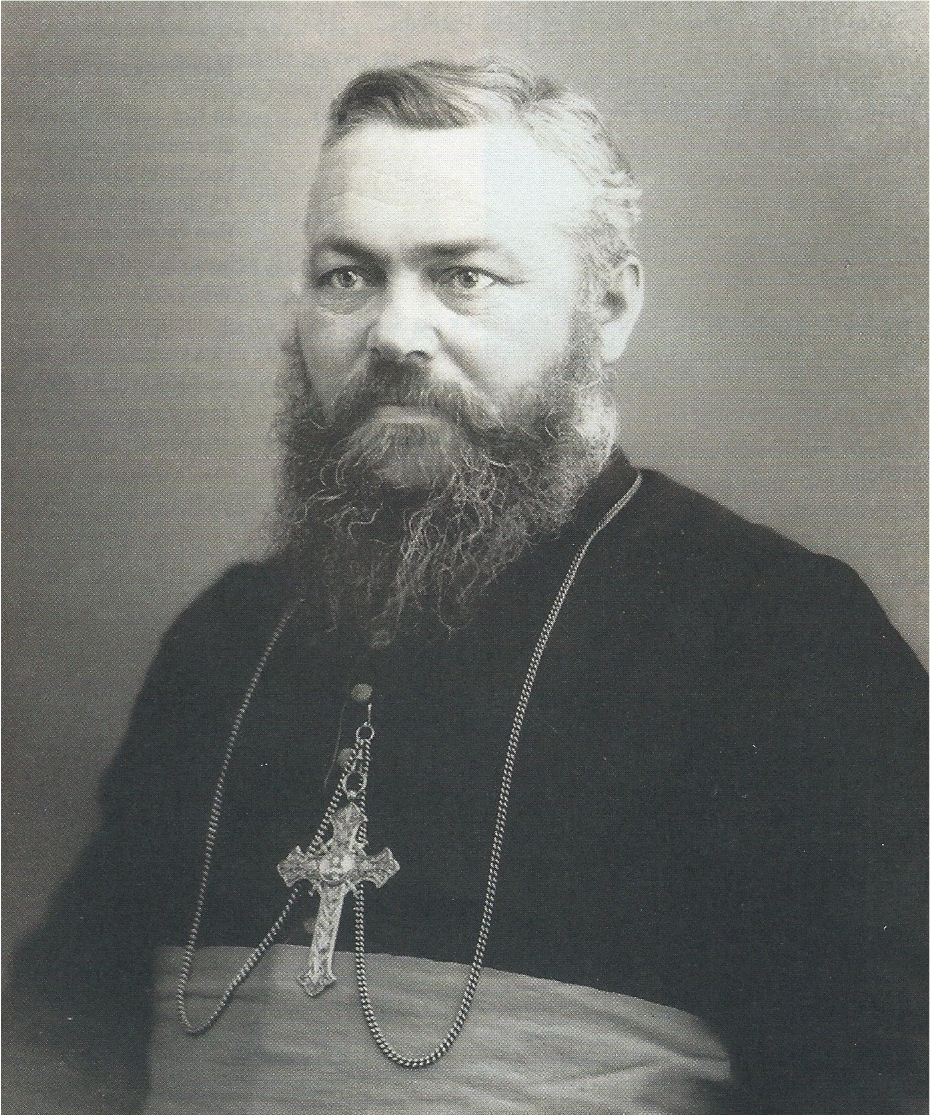
Frans Schraven

== Details ==
During the Sino-Japanese war, troops of the Japanese empire progressed to take in the city of Zhengding. Up to 5,000 local residents sought refuge from the local Bishop, Frans Schraven. Of those 5,000, it is estimated that 200 young women were amongst those seeking refuge, who were thought to be at risk of being abused as comfort women.

The clergymen initially resisted the Japanese troops' demands and were later abducted and, according to reports, burned alive. Besides Schraven, those who died were Fathers Gerard Wouters and Antoon Gerts (Netherlands), Father Thomas Ceska (Austria with Croatian heritage), Fathers Lucien Charny, Eugene-Antoine Bertrand, André Robial (France), Brother Wladislaw (Poland) and Anton Biskupits (Slovakia).

The act of the bishop and his priests has led to calls for his beatification and canonisation as patron saint for victims of sexual abuse.
