= East Lancashire Hospitals NHS Trust =

NHS hospital trust

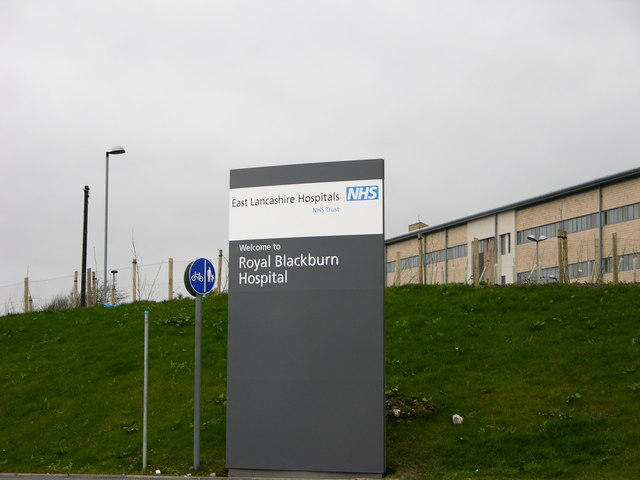
- Entrance to the Royal Blackburn Hospital
- Type: NHS trust
- Established: 1 September 2002
- Region served: East Lancashire
- Hospitals: Royal Blackburn Teaching Hospital; Burnley General Teaching Hospital; Clitheroe Community Hospital; Pendle Community Hospital
- Chair: Shazad Sarwar
- Chief executive: Martin Hodgson
- Website: elht.nhs.uk

East Lancashire Hospitals NHS Trust (ELHT) is an NHS hospital trust in Lancashire, managing Royal Blackburn Teaching Hospital, Burnley General Teaching Hospital and 2 community hospitals.

== History ==
The Trust was established on 1 September 2002, as the result of a locally controversial, cost saving merger of Blackburn Hyndburn & Ribble Valley NHS Trust and Burnley Health Care NHS Trust, first announced in September 1999.

Shazad Sarwar was appointed chair in 2022. He was Deputy Chair of Airedale NHS Foundation Trust and has held many non-executive roles.

== Hospitals ==
The trust's two major bases are the Royal Blackburn Teaching Hospital, and the Burnley General Teaching Hospital. The Trust's headquarters and the majority of management is based at the Royal Blackburn Hospital, the larger of the two. The trust manages two further hospitals:

- Clitheroe Community Hospital
- Pendle Community Hospital

Blackburn Royal Infirmary was shut in July 2006 as part of a merger of Blackburn's two sites, planned before the trust was formed. Rossendale General Hospital, was shut down over a period dating from 2006, finally closing in September 2010.

In October 2024, the Trust announced that all services provided by Accrington Victoria Hospital were to be relocated due to large parts of the hospital building being beyond repair. The final service to move was the Minor Injuries Unit on the 20 December 2024, which relocated about a mile away to the Acorn Primary Care Centre. This signified the temporary closure of the hospital until a decision can be made about its future use.

== da Vinci Surgical System ==
The trust installed a da Vinci Surgical System at the Royal Blackburn Hospital in June 2015, against the advice of NHS England, whose advice is that "A proliferation of centres offering robotic surgery should be avoided until a national policy can be developed." Lancashire Teaching Hospitals NHS Foundation Trust consider themselves to be the leading provider of prostatectomies within the region, but the trust plans to challenge this. The Robotic Prostatectomy service has subsequently proven to be both popular and effective for patients of East Lancashire and across the Northwest. The robot has gone on to be used for other procedures with similar success.

== Emergency services ==
The Trust closed the Accident and Emergency department at Burnley General Hospital in November 2007, replacing the department with an Urgent care centre, treating minor injuries and illnesses.

This has enabled the Emergency Department at Royal Blackburn to concentrate on the more serious cases from across the Trust, for which it is better equipped, with emergency theatres and an Intensive Care Unit. Following this move, a helipad was constructed several metres from the entrance to the Emergency Department at Blackburn, so some critically unwell patients could be airlifted to the department by the North West Air Ambulance.

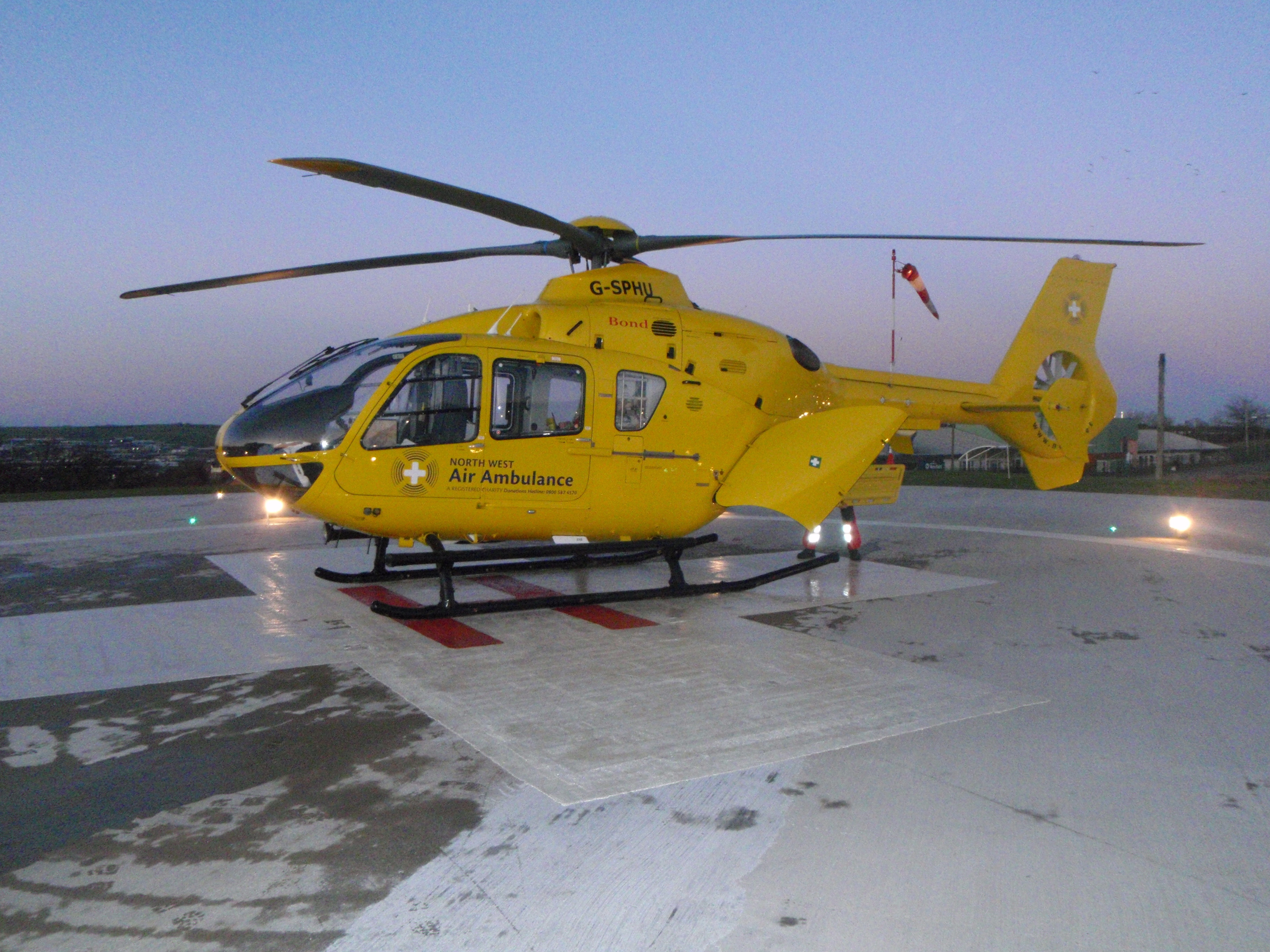
North West Air Ambulance on the helipad at Royal Blackburn Hospital, January 2010

The decision was deeply unpopular with the public of the Burnley and Pendle districts, who were most affected by the change. A campaign to save/return the A&E service was a central issue in local politics. Both the district's current MPs were elected in 2010 on a platform of support for the campaign.

In December 2011, Burnley MP Gordon Birtwistle claimed a partial victory, with news of a new £12m emergency unit. The new Burnley Urgent Care Centre opened in 2014. The trust has confirmed there will be no return of a full accident and emergency department to Burnley.

== Hospital refurbishment ==
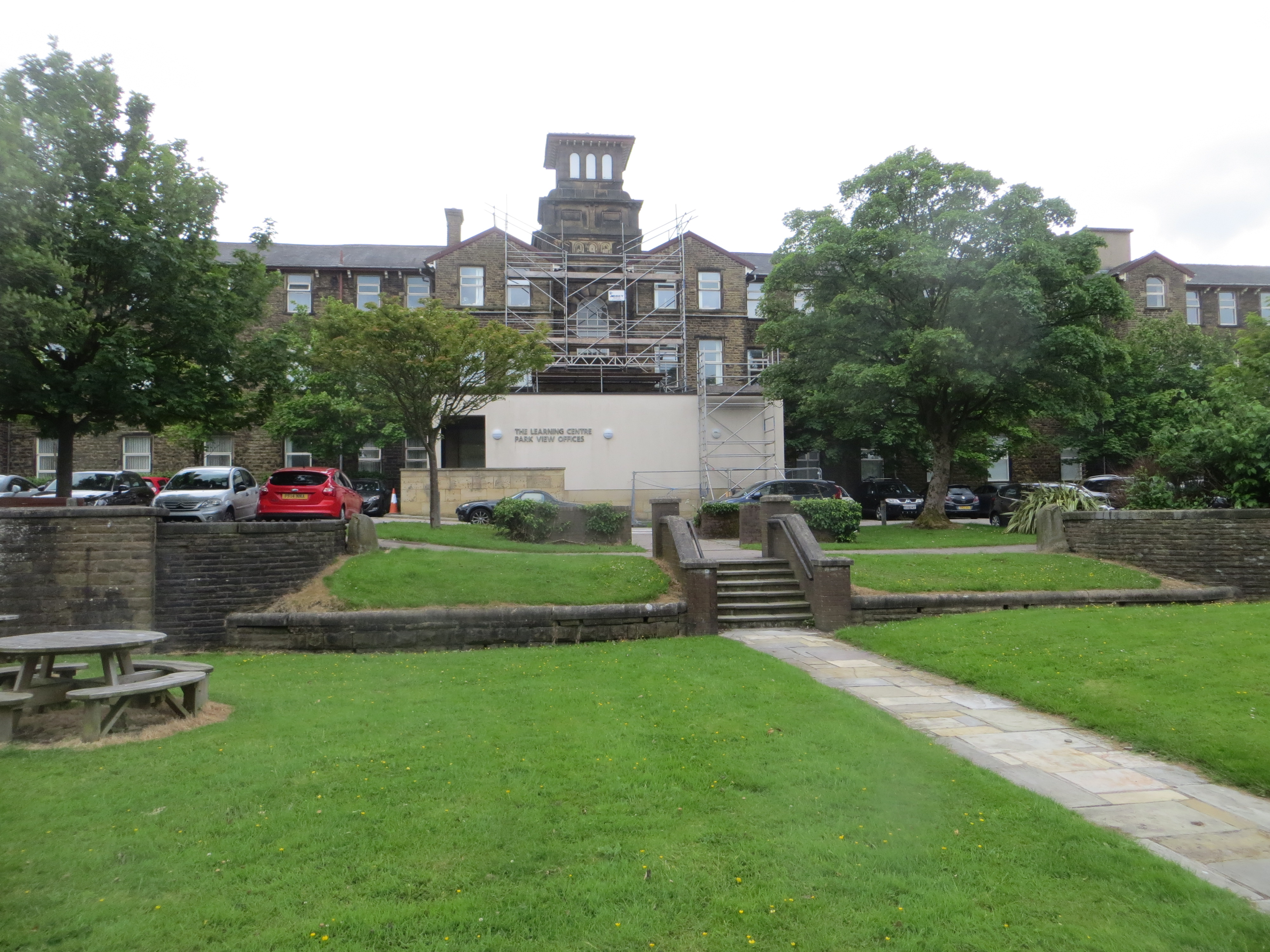
Original Workhouse now the Royal Blackburn Teaching Hospital Learning Centre and Park View Offices

The trust inherited two PFI construction projects from its predecessors, both planned in the 1990s. The Blackburn Royal Infirmary (BRI), was decommissioned in July 2006, after a new hospital building was built at the existing Queens Park Hospital (QPH) site in the town, formerly a Workhouse, so to merge the two sites into a single hospital for Blackburn, which had been planned since September 1996. Construction of the Royal Blackburn Hospital began in July 2003, with it being completed three years later.

This meant the moving of many departments, and much publicity was made about the moving of the Accident & Emergency department, so to avoid public confusion of the exact time when the A&E at BRI shut, and the ED at the newly merged Royal Blackburn Hospital site opened. In Burnley, a smaller scheme known as Phase 5 was underway, intended to provide improved care of the elderly, and dermatology facilities.

Also, much consolidation has come into effect since the merging of the two original trusts. This has involved the closure of many wards and departments at the Burnley General Hospital, with much speculation of the site's belittlement. Despite this, a new building was completed in May 2006 (known as Phase 5). The trust continues to make major investments on the Burnley site, with £32 million development of the Lancashire Women & Newborn Centre and £0.3M fitting ventilation systems in two operating theatres, to undertake additional orthopaedic surgery. The 46 bedded Lancashire Elective Centre was opened in December 2017 following £18m investment.

== Shuttle buses ==
Since the consolidation of many departments, patients have recently been required to attend clinics at a different site from their local hospital. Also, staff frequently move between the Blackburn and Burnley hospitals to go about their work. Because of this, a free shuttle bus was introduced between sites in 2007, using the M65 to quickly shuttle between both hospitals. In January 2025, the Trust announced that it was stopping the current free service as it could no longer afford to run it. The service has now been picked up by a local firm, Moving People Bus and Coach Services, at a cost to users. The shuttle bus will now run from Blackburn Town Centre to Burnley Town Centre via the two hospitals from 0600-2100 Monday to Friday.

== Foundation Trust application ==
East Lancashire Hospitals NHS Trust has been attempting to become an NHS Foundation Trust since 2007. Becoming an FT was an important development for the Trust and to survive into the future, the organisation was required to complete a successful application before April 2013, but like many NHS Trusts it failed to meet this deadline.

The chief executive, Mark Brearley, announced he was resigning with immediate effect in December 2013.

== Quality of care ==
In October 2013, as a result of the Keogh Review the Trust was put into the highest risk category by the Care Quality Commission. It was put into special measures and there were calls for resignations. Concerns centred on the Trust's policy of opening extra beds, or leaving patients on chairs and trolleys, to deal with surges in demand. It was put into a buddying arrangement with Salford Royal NHS Foundation Trust.

In December 2013, it became clear that stroke services at the Royal Blackburn Hospital were under threat. The service, which has dealt with 759 patients in the last twelve months, has missed a key performance target every month this year for 90% of stroke patients to be admitted to a specialist ward within four hours of arrival. This was achieved in just 47 per cent of cases between April and September this year.

Of all the providers of specialised services in England, the trust was least compliant with the quality standards set for them by leading clinicians in October 2014.

In January 2017, the Trust was rated 'Good' by the Care Quality Commission following significant improvement.

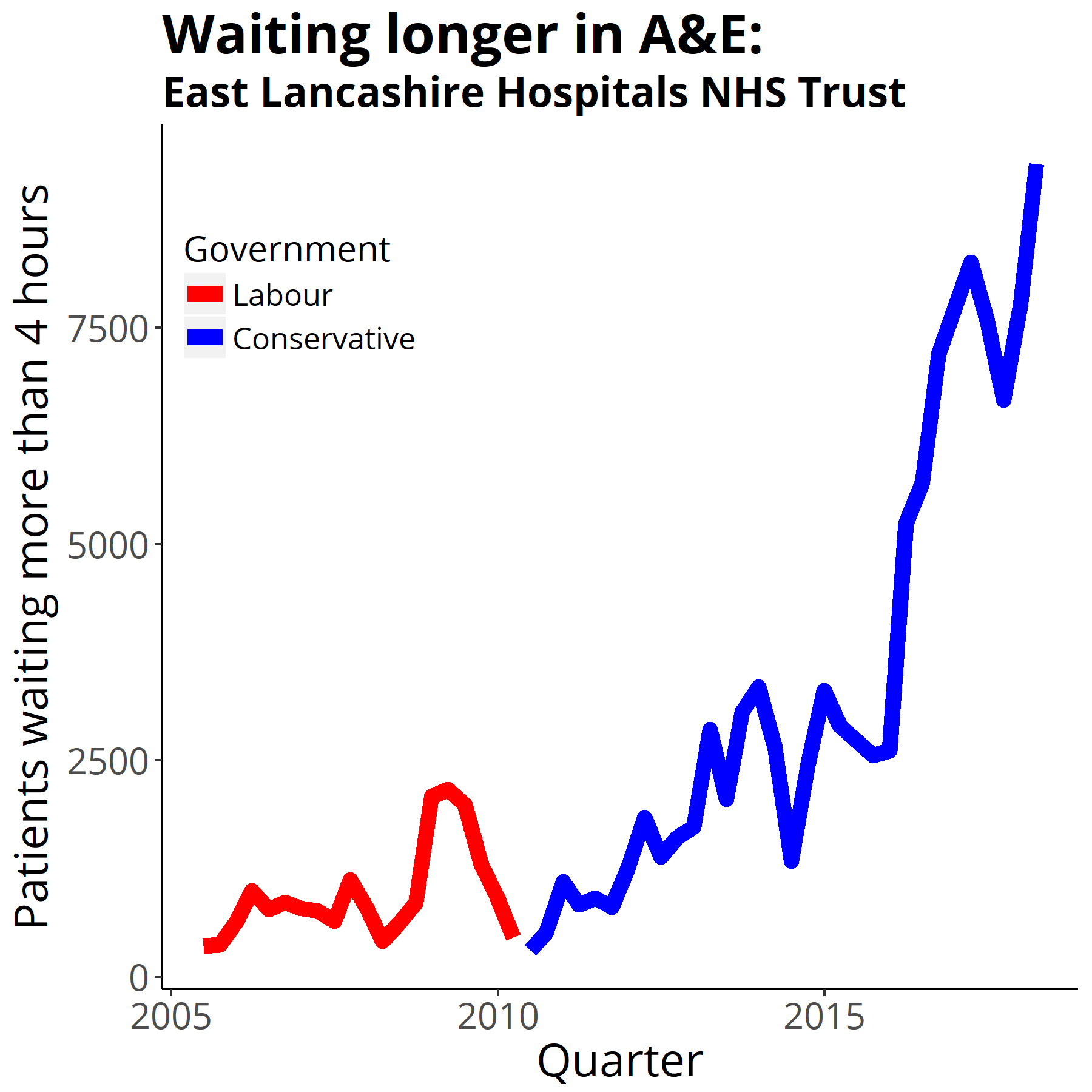
Four-hour target in the emergency department quarterly figures from NHS England Data from https://www.england.nhs.uk/statistics/statistical-work-areas/ae-waiting-times-and-activity/

In March 2018 it was the eighth worst performer in A&E in England, with only 61% of patients in the main A&E seen within 4 hours.

The Trust was inspected by the Care Quality Commission in 2018 and given an overall rating of Good, with two areas classified as Outstanding, namely community end of life care and specialist community mental health services for children and young people.

== Clinical education ==
The trust recently began accepting small numbers of medical students for components of their clinical training. All students allocated to Royal Blackburn Hospital are based either at Royal Preston Hospital or Salford Royal Hospital in Greater Manchester.

The Postgraduate Medical & Dental Education website has further information on Foundation and Specialty Training in East Lancashire.

== Staffing ==
It was named by the Health Service Journal as one of the top hundred NHS trusts to work for in July 2015.

== See also ==
- List of hospitals in England
- List of NHS trusts
