= Sir Henry Norman, 1st Baronet =

English journalist and politician (1858–1939)

The Right Honourable Sir Henry Norman Bt PC JP

Personal details
- Born: 19 September 1858 Leicester
- Died: 4 June 1939 (aged 80)
- Party: Liberal Party
- Spouse(s): Ménie Muriel Dowie; Florence Priscilla McLaren
- Children: Nigel Norman

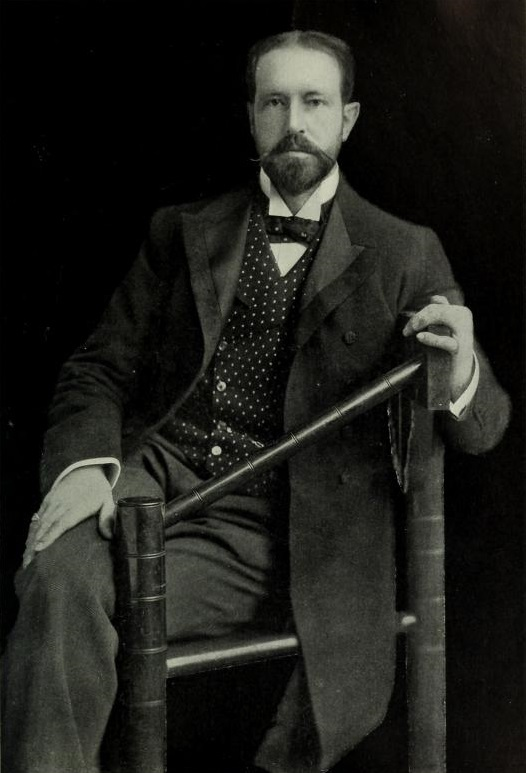
Henry Norman

Sir Henry Norman, 1st Baronet PC JP (19 September 1858 – 4 June 1939) was an English journalist and Liberal Member of Parliament and government minister. Norman was educated privately in France and at Harvard University, where he obtained his B.A. For several years he worked on the editorial staff of the Pall Mall Gazette and later joined the editorial staff of the Daily Chronicle, being appointed Assistant Editor of the latter in 1895. He retired from journalism in 1899. During this time he travelled widely in Canada and the United States and in Russia, Japan, China, Siam, Malaya and Central Asia. Much of the material included in the two volumes mentioned in the description was amassed during these tours. He was knighted in 1906, and made a baronet in 1915.

== Family and education ==
Norman was born in Leicester, the son of Henry Norman, a merchant and local radical politician. Norman was educated at Leicester Collegiate School and Grove House School and later studied theology and philosophy at Leipzig and Harvard University. His family were Unitarians in religion, and Norman first embarked on a career as a preacher, but he gave up this calling and his religion upon returning to England.

In 1891 he married author Ménie Muriel Dowie (1867–1945) but they divorced in 1903 on the grounds of her adultery with a family friend, Edward Arthur Fitzgerald. Norman was awarded custody of their son Henry Nigel St Valery Norman, who was born in 1897 and succeeded him in the baronetcy.

In 1907 he married Florence Priscilla McLaren (1884–1964), the daughter of the wealthy industrialist and Liberal MP, Sir Charles McLaren. They had three children.

In 1922 he purchased Ramster Hall, Chiddingfold, Guildford, Surrey with Lady Norman.

== Journalism ==
Norman became a journalist working for the Pall Mall Gazette and the New York Times. As a journalist he was famous for uncovering the truth behind the Dreyfus Affair. He was on the staff of the Daily Chronicle from 1892, becoming assistant editor. Norman travelled extensively in the East, where he took a number of photographs that are held at Cambridge University. Later he founded and edited the magazine The World's Work (vols 1–42, 1902–1923).

== Travels ==
In an essay published in the New York Times, Norman said that his travels in the Russian Empire took him "nearly 20,000 miles." He said that despite the size of the country, "it revolved as smoothly as the well-welded flywheel." He also stated that "few provincial towns in Europe or America have theaters and museums as fine as those in Irkutsk and Tiflis." According to him, there were "half-a-dozen industries which promise a fortune" in places like Poland and Russia as a whole. The New York Times published these observations on October 14, 1900.

== Government and other appointments ==
He was appointed Assistant Postmaster-General in January 1910. His interest in international communications led to a number of appointments related to wireless and telegraphy: among them

- Chairman of the War Office Committee on Wireless Telegraphy (1912)
- Chairman of the Imperial Wireless Telegraphy Committee of 1920 (the Norman Committee), which was convened to draw up a complete wireless scheme for the Empire, and recommended wireless communications covering a range of 2,000 miles.

In 1918 he was admitted to the Privy Council. He contributed to government committees including chairing a Select Committee on Patent Medicines (specifically advertisements for them and fraudulent claims), on rent restrictions, on betting duty and on industrial paints. He championed the rights and regulation of motorists in the House of Commons even though he had himself been fined for speeding (30 mph) under a scheme he himself had advocated to the Royal Commission. Norman was appointed a Justice of the Peace for Surrey.

=== Outside government ===
In 1914, he became the first President of the Derby Wireless Club, founded in 1911.

Norman was also a director of a number of companies connected to coal mining and iron trades.

He was an early advocate of wireless broadcasting, opening the All British Wireless Exhibition at the Royal Horticultural Hall, Westminster in 1922 at which he predicted, to a very sceptical press, the ubiquitous uptake of the technology into all homes.

== World War I ==
Sir Henry was the Munitions Inventions Department's permanent attaché to the French Ministry of Inventions. At the end of the war Sir Henry was involved in the detailed planning for a proposed transatlantic flight using a F.B.27. Vickers Vimy. This planning included the route to be flown, the hangar facilities and the provision of fuel for the aircraft in Newfoundland.

== Politics ==
Sir Henry Norman

Norman was a Liberal Member of Parliament for Wolverhampton South from 1900 to 1910, and for Blackburn from 1910 to 1923. He was an advocate for a number of causes, notably women's suffrage. Norman was a supporter of David Lloyd George, organising the Budget League in support of his People's Budget in 1909–10, personally representing Lloyd George in France on a number of occasions during the First World War, and helping organise the government's campaign during the "Coupon Election" of 1918. In 1915 he was created a baronet, and took the designation "of Honeyhanger in the Parish of Shottermill in the County of Surrey".

== Selected writings ==
- An Account of the Harvard Greek Play (1881)
- The Preservation of Niagara Falls (1882)
- The Real Japan (1892)
- The Peoples and Politics of the Far East (1895)
- The Treatment and Training of Disabled and Discharged Soldiers in France (1917)
- All the Russias (1902)
- Will No Man Understand? a play, (1934)
- Bodyke : A Chapter in the History of Irish Landlordism (1887)

== Notes ==
Parliament of the United Kingdom
| Preceded by John Lloyd Gibbons | Member of Parliament for Wolverhampton South; 1900–January 1910 | Succeeded by T. E. Hickman |
| Preceded by Phillip Snowden and Thomas Barclay | Member of Parliament for Blackburn; December 1910–1923; With: Phillip Snowden 1910–1918; Percy Dean 1918–1922; Sydney Henn 1922–1923 | Succeeded by Sydney Henn and John Duckworth |
Baronetage of the United Kingdom
| New creation | Baronet (of Honeyhanger); 1915–1939 | Succeeded by Nigel Norman |
