= James Pilkington =

James Pilkington may refer to:

- James Pilkington (bishop) (1520–1576), Bishop of Durham
- James Pilkington (politician) (1804–1890), merchant and MP for Blackburn
- James Pilkington (actor), South African actor in the TV series Skeem Saam
