= List of Blackburn historical plaques =

Blackburn has several plaques placed in locations of historic significance.

A blue plaque scheme, consisting of twenty-four plaques in the style of the English Heritage Plaques, was managed by Blackburn Civic Society until it folded. Later, Blackburn Local History Society agreed to take on responsibility of managing the local scheme and worked with Blackburn with Darwen Borough Council to add additional plaques as part of a local heritage festival in 2014. A number of the blue plaques have since gone missing, though some have been replaced by granite plaques to make them less appealing to metal thieves.

The British Film Institute placed two plaques in Blackburn as part of the Centenary of Cinema celebration in 1996.

In addition to these, other plaques have been placed that do not belong to any organised scheme.

== Locations of plaques ==
Subject	Image	Location	Plaque text
Plug Plot Riots		BBC Radio Lancashire, Darwen Street, Blackburn 53.74698°N 2.48280°W	Here in Darwen St on 15th August 1842, textile workers protesting against wage cuts in the famous "Plug Plot" were fired upon by troops of the 72nd Regiment. Up to three of the demonstrators are thought to have been killed.
Jack Walker		Randal Street, Blackburn 53.75235°N 2.48281°W; Note - The original blue plaque was placed in May 2001, but stolen in February 2014. It was later replaced with a black granite plaque.	Jack Walker 1929 - 2000. Entrepreneur, philanthropist, benefactor, and patron of Blackburn Rovers was born here.
Blackburn Corporation Tramways		Jubilee Street, Blackburn 53.74633°N 2.248054°W	Blackburn Corporation Tramways. Electrification commenced here March, 1899. Electricity generated here, the site of the town's first power station. A.S. Giles, Engineer.
John Noel Nichols		Bank House, 8 Adelaide Terrace, Dukes Brow, Blackburn 53.75184°N 2.49599°W Note - A blue plaque was placed after Nicols death in 1966 but this was stolen and later replaced with a black granite plaque.	Birthplace of John Noel Nichols, 1883 - 1966. Educated at Queen Elizabeth's Grammar and the inventor of Vimto.
Rev. Dr. Chad Varah, CH, CBE, MA		105 New Park Street, Blackburn 53.75165°N 2.48954°W	Rev. Dr. Chad Varah, CH, CBE, MA, was vicar of Holy Trinity Blackburn from 1942 to 1949. He founded the Samaritans in 1953.
Alfred Wainwright		331 Audley Range, Blackburn 53.74643°N 2.45733°W	The birthplace of Alfred Wainright, author and fell walker (1907 - 1991).
Professor John Garstang		Strawberry Bank, Blackburn 53.75149°N 2.48764°W	Professor John Garstang (1876 - 1956) Egyptologist. Was born here 5th May, 1876.
Blackburn Rovers		Ewood Park, Nuttall Street, Blackburn 53.72849°N 2.49014°W	Blackburn Rovers. A founder member of the football league, 1888
Sir Robert Peel, Bart		Barton Street, Blackburn 53.74800°N 2.48578°W	A farmhouse here was the early home of Sir Robert Peel, Bart., (1750 - 1830). Father of Robert Peel, Prime Minister.
Mitchell and Kenyon		Northgate, Blackburn 53.74833°N 2.48459°W	Mitchell and Kenyon. Blackburn's pioneer cinematographers and producers of Norden Films were based here 1897 - 1901.
Dorothy Whipple		Edgeware Road, Blackburn 53.75600°N 2.50095°W	The novelist Dorothy Whipple nee Strirrup (1893 - 1966) was born in this house on 26th February 1893.
Blackburn and Over Darwen Tramway		Postal Order, 15 - 19 Darwen Street, Blackburn 53.74668°N 2.48251°W	Blackburn and Over Darwen Tramway. This road junction was the northern terminus of the first street tramway in the kingdom to be worked entirely by steam, officially opened 14th April, 1881.
William Wolstenholme		Mill Lane, Blackburn 53.74582°N 2.48380°W	Here, on 24 February 1865, was born William Wolstenholme MUS.BAC (OXON) F.R.C.O. -HON.CAUSA-, the gifted blind organist and composer.
A. N. Hornby		41 King Street, Blackburn 53.74635°N 2.48712°W	A. N. 'Monkey' Hornby (1847 - 1925) Captain of England at cricket and rugby and footballer for Blackburn Rovers, was born here 10th February 1847.
Nicolò Paganini		Paganini Inn, Northgate, Blackburn 53.74856°N 2.48503°W	Nicolò Paganini celebrated violinist stayed at an inn here when he gave a recital in Blackburn 5th September 1833.
River Blakewater		Darwen Street, Blackburn 53.74467°N 2.248239°W Note - Plaque has been removed	This crossing of the River Blakewater marks the site of the original ford. By the south side of the bridge stood the 18th century lock-up.
John Morley		Clayton Street, Blackburn 53.74617°N 2.48631°W	John Morley, Viscount Morley of Blackburn (1838 - 1923). Author, Cabinet Minister and Secretary of State for India, was born in a house on this site on Christmas Eve 1838.
Harry Hornby		King Street, Blackburn 53.74734°N 2.48479°W	The Leyland House, built 1741. Grade II listed. The birthplace of Sir Harry Hornby M.P. 29th August, 1841.
Blackburn Hundred		Billinge Wood, Blackburn 53.74991°N 2.51815°W	On 15th May, 1429, the Three Weekly Court of the Blackburn Hundred was held on this hill. Here John Nowell paid homage for land that he held in Great Harwood from Thomas Hesketh of Rufford, the Lord of the Manor of Great Harwood
Gilbert Hoghton		6 Adelaide Terrace, Blackburn 53.75206°N 2.49572°W	Early in the English Civil War, Sir Gilbert Hoghton and his Preston Royalists bombarded Blackburn with cannon fire from here, Christmas Day, 1642
Blackburn railway station (Two plaques)		Blackburn Railway Station (Foyer), Railway Road, Blackburn 53.74654°N 2.47956°W	Blackburn Railway Station. This station was completed by the Lancashire & Yorkshire Railway in 1888, replacing the town's first station opened by the Blackburn & Preston Railway at this site in Stonybutts on 1st June 1846. The station frontage building is listed Grade II and stands in a Conservation Area. Blackburn Railway Station. Railtrack acknowledges the contribution to the cost of restoration of the station frontage building in 1996 from the Railway Heritage Trust, Lancashire County Council, and the Borough of Blackburn.
Lyceum Theatre		Market Street Lane, Blackburn 53.74708°N 2.48364°W Note - Plaque has been removed	Commemorating the Centenary of Cinema 1996. Lyceum Theatre. This building, then a theatre, was the venue for the first moving picture show in Blackburn. 28th September 1896. In association with the British Film Institute
Daniel Burley Woolfall	Image available externally -	1 Crosshill Road, Blackburn 53.75017°N 2.50497°W; Note - Plaque has been removed	Daniel Burley Woolfall, first British President of FIFA, 1900 - 1918, lived here.
Kathleen Ferrier		57 Lynwood Road, Blackburn 53.75354°N 2.50373°W	The home from 1913 to 1933 of Kathleen Ferrier, contralto singer (1912 to 1953)
Wensley Fold C E School		Manor Road, Blackburn 53.74924°N 2.50684°W	Wensley Fold C E School. The Victorian house formerly in these grounds became Crosshill Preparatory School, attended by Kathleen Ferrier contralto (1912 - 1953)
All Hallows Spring Well		Railway Road, Blackburn 53.74734°N 2.47926°W Note - No public access	Below this plaque is the site of All Hallows Spring Well, in ancient times a place of pilgrimage and healing. Erected 1955
The Revidge Tank	Image available externally -	Revidge Road, Blackburn 53.75968°N 2.49421°W Note - Plaque has been removed	The Revidge Tank. This tank was built by Ashton Frost of Blackburn as a water service reservoir in 1987. It stands on the site of a bronze age burial mound dating from about 1,500 B.C.
Spring Mount	Image not available	Spring Mount, Preston New Road, Blackburn 53.75121°N 2.49534°W Note - Plaque missing since the Girls School was demolished	Spring Mount. Built for Dr James Barlow 1826. Home to Sir William Coddington, MP for Blackburn 1880 - 1906. Became Blackburn Girls High School (1883 - 1961). Attended by Kathleen Ferrier. Eastern extension added 1891.
Percy Dean		19 Gorse Road, Blackburn 53.74837°N 2.50869°W Note - Plaque has been temporarily removed	Lieut. Commander Percy Dean MP who was awarded the VC for his part in the raid on Zeebrugge in Belgium on 23rd April 1918 lived here
Blackburn Fire Station	Image available externally -	The Mall, Blackburn 53.74825°N 2.48330°W Note - Plaque has been removed	Blackburn Fire Station Bicentennial 1794 - 1994 Near this spot stood the earliest recorded site of a Fire Station in Blackburn
Harry Healless		6 Top O' Th' Croft, Blackburn 53.72636°N 2.48889°W	Harry Healless, Captain of Blackburn Rovers' 1928 F.A. Cup winning team, was born here, 9th February, 1893
James O'Donnell		University Close, Blackburn 53.74903°N 2.49040°W	Here fell Detective Inspector James O'Donnell QPM MM & BAR 13th December 1958 Blackburn Borough Police, Police Memorial Trust.
John Wesley	Image available externally -	Market Hall, Penny Street, Blackburn 53.74939°N 2.47995°W Note - Plaque was removed when the building was demolished	Close to this spot the first Methodist Meeting House in Blackburn was opened by John Wesley, then 76 years of age, on 27th May 1780.
Sarah Ellen		25 Isherwood Street, Blackburn 53.73372°N 2.48961°W	Sarah Ellen 1872 - 1913 Lived here 1901 - 1912
