= London garrotting panics =

Moral panics of 1856, 1862–63

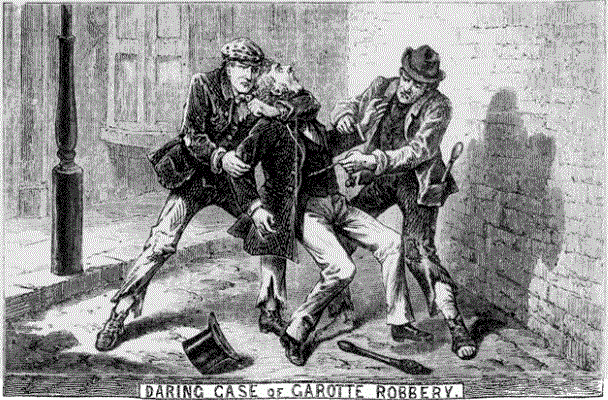
An 1880 newspaper depiction of a garrotte robbery

The London garrotting panics were two moral panics that occurred in London in 1856 and 1862–63 over a perceived increase in violent street robbery. Garrotting was a term used for robberies in which the victim was strangled to incapacitate them but came to be used as a catch-all term for what is described today as a mugging.

Despite a general fall in crime following the 1829 establishment of the Metropolitan Police, the press reported in 1856 that garrotting was on the rise. They laid the blame at the recent cessation of transportation to Australia as a punishment for offenders and the subsequent adoption of the ticket of leave system of release on licence. The reported rise in street robbery is considered to have largely been an invention of the press; fears subsided when press coverage petered out at the end of the year. The panic led to the Penal Servitude Act 1857, which increased the minimum prison sentence for offences previously punished by transportation.

The July 1862 garrotting of Member of Parliament James Pilkington, widely covered in the press, led to a renewed panic. Again the penal system was criticised for its supposed softness and the police for their inefficiency. The panic saw some Londoners wearing anti-garrotting clothing such as studded leather collars and cravats with razor blades sewn in, a move which was parodied by Punch. The panic led to new legislation on prison conditions, which were made substantially more harsh. Prison sentences lengthened and flogging returned for violent street robberies. These measures affected criminals throughout the late Victorian era and reversed previous measures to move the prison system from punishment towards rehabilitation. The panic petered out by the start of 1863 with reduced press coverage as other stories took over the headlines.

== Background ==
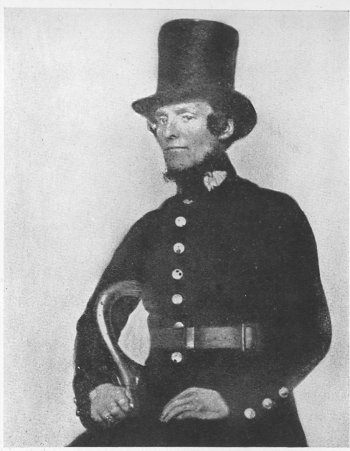
A Metropolitan Police constable in the 1850s, showing high anti-strangulation collar

Garrotting is a term for strangulation that came into English from the garrotte, an execution device commonly used in Spain and its former colonies. The term came into common use in Britain after widespread coverage of the execution of General Narciso López in Havana in September 1851. It came to refer to a particular type of street robbery in which the victim was strangled with a cord or by the attacker's arm to incapacitate them, often whilst an accomplice relieved them of their valuables. Contemporary reports claimed that the technique was learnt by convicts on prison hulks where it was used by jailers to subdue troublesome convicts. The Metropolitan Police had, since their founding, worn 4-inch (100 mm) high leather collars as a protection against strangulation.

The term later developed into a wider use to cover all forms of street robbery in which violence was used. This was a similar use to the modern term mugging and, prior to the 1850s, the Indian term thugee had carried a similar meaning. The phrase "putting the hug on" was also used in the mid-Victorian era.

== 1856 ==
Although difficult to measure at a time when most crime went unrecorded it is thought that crime in London had generally been reducing since the 1829 establishment of the Metropolitan Police. Despite this, in 1856 the British public regarded the streets of London as dangerous. A November speech by the Prime Minister Lord Palmerston announcing that Britons would feel safe to travel the world led to an editorial in the Times that stated "it is of far more moment to a Londoner that he should be able at all hours of the day or night to walk safely in the streets of London". The editor claimed that areas of the city were no-go areas for respectable people who were at "imminent danger of being throttled, robbed, and if not actually murdered, at least kicked and pommelled within an inch of his life". Subsequent reports in the press claimed that garrotting was on the rise and led to a panic among the middle classes.

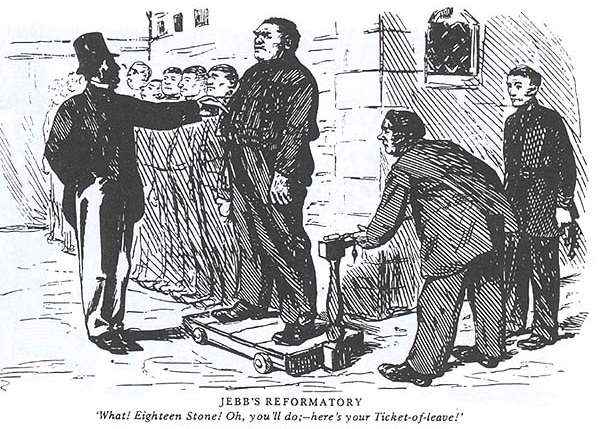
An 1862 Punch cartoon satirising the ticket of leave scheme. A convict is released by a friendly jailer upon having attained a suitable weight.

The press reports laid the blame at a supposedly "soft" penal system and for the increasing numbers of prisoners released on parole under the ticket of leave scheme. This scheme had been introduced by the Penal Servitude Act 1853 to relieve prison overcrowding. This had been caused by the cessation, in most cases, of transportation to Australia as a punishment and its replacement with penal servitude (imprisonment with hard labour), of a minimum sentence of three years. The ticket of leave scheme was one of the first uses of release on licence for prisoners in the United Kingdom.

Newspapers reported that violent crime, previously considered a problem only in working class areas of the city, was spreading to middle-class neighbourhoods. There was frequent correspondence in the Times, which carried seven editorials on garrotting during the panic, with one writer claiming that garrotters "no longer confine their operations to by-lanes but attack us in the most frequented thoroughfares of the metropolis". The criminals, sometimes called "street Bedouins", were characterised as "work-shy savages with a propensity for gratuitous violence". The increased publicity for garrotting crimes led to judges and magistrates imposing harsher sentences on those convicted for violent robbery offences. The moral panic is considered to have originated in the press coverage and subsided when coverage was curtailed. The newspapers considered that the story would not remain newsworthy into 1857 and so seem to have made use of some minor changes to legislation to declare the end of the crisis. A House of Commons select committee met to consider alternatives to the ticket of leave system, its report lamented the end of transportation but was largely positive about the system. Its recommendations on minor adjustments to the ticket of leave system were confirmed by the Penal Servitude Act 1857, which was accompanied by guidance from the home secretary, Sir George Grey on how the system should work.

Under the Penal Servitude Act 1857 criminals would continue to be released on a ticket of leave by prisons at the earliest opportunity though the minimum sentence for offences previously punished by transportation was increased from four years to seven. There remained a lack of police resources to adequately monitor those released on licence, which some reporters suggested would lead to future issues. Following the panic the public fear of garrotting subsided in the later 1850s. In 1859 the Metropolitan Police reduced the height of their anti-garrotting stocks to 2 inches (51 mm).

== 1862–63 ==
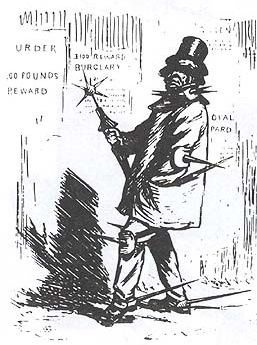
Anti-garrotte attire lampooned in Punch 1862

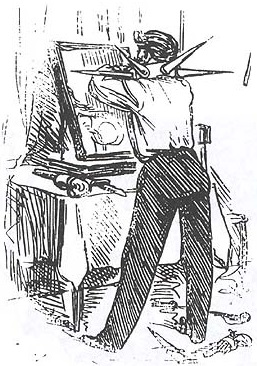
Anti-garrotte collar lampooned in Punch 1862

A second moral panic occurred in 1862 after the robbery of the member of parliament for Blackburn, James Pilkington. Pilkington was garrotted at 1:00 am on 17 July in Pall Mall, returning from a late night sitting of the House of Commons. Pilkington was assaulted by two attackers who stole his pocket watch. The attack was widely publicised in the press and served as the inspiration for an attack on a cabinet minister in Anthony Trollope's Phineas Finn.

Crime had continued to fall through the 1850s, though the police figures for Middlesex (which included much of London north of the Thames) show a slight increase in robberies in the early part of 1862. Despite this there was widespread coverage in the newspapers with almost every fresh street robbery being seized upon as evidence of another garrotting crime wave. The Times once more led the coverage but reports were also made in the Sun, Observer, Punch and the Saturday Review. The Daily News described London as "a lair of footpads and assassins by night" while the Quarterly Review claimed that "the streets of the metropolis are not safe even in the daytime". The press claimed again that the treatment of criminals in prison was not a deterrent and Sir Joshua Jebb, director of convict prisons, came in for particular criticism.

Police figures for the last quarter of the year show a significant increase in street robbery, though crime in general was falling. The increase might be attributed to greater reporting of robbery following the publicity of the Pilkington case or to the concentration of police resources in this area as a result of the panic. The Middlesex quarter sessions saw an unprecedented 27 garrotters tried, which Metropolitan Police Commissioner Sir Richard Mayne claimed were almost all of the violent street robbers in London. Sentences passed in this period tended to be heavier than normal, which was attributed to the panic.

During this period, in November and December, the Times continued to focus on the panic printing 18 editorials calling for the return of transportation. It continued to blame the legal system, claiming that "the whole of this great and most expensive judicial hierarchy seems to be established solely to catch thieves and let them go again"; the home secretary (Grey) and prison chaplains were singled out for particular criticism. The newspaper printed correspondence from readers recommending the establishment of new penal colonies in Labrador, the Falkland Islands, Queensland and the Cameroon mountains. Newspaper coverage of the panic declined significantly in December as it was displaced by other stories, including the replacement of Otto of Greece, the capture of Giuseppe Garibaldi in Italy, the Lancashire Cotton Famine and developments in the ongoing American Civil War. The Times reflected on the panic in June 1863 and considered that the crisis had ended due to greater publicity and the refocusing of police resources.

The event is now viewed a classic example of a moral panic, a period of intense media coverage with little basis in fact. The Shoreditch Advertiser investigated cases in its district and found not one verifiable case of garrotting among numerous reports, with them all found to be "utterly fictitious or mere drunken squabbles". The panic was largely confined to London, despite the fact that it had lower levels of street robbery than other parts of the country, such as the north west. The panic led to shifts in the behaviour of Londoners. There were cases of citizens attacking one another in the mistaken belief that they were preventing a garrotting. Some Londoners took measures towards self-defence including the purchase of personal weapons and the adoption of bizarre anti-garrotting devices such as spiked collars and cravats with razor blades sewn into them. These were lampooned by cartoons in Punch which included clothing with oversized spikes and overcoats with umbrella-like tails to prevent garrotters approaching the wearer.

== New legislation ==
The 1862 panic led to significant changes in legislation. Under pressure from the press Grey set up the Royal Commission on Penal Servitude and Transportation in December 1862 to review the prison situation and determine if transportation should be reintroduced. The commission reported in June 1863 and its recommendations were implemented via the Penal Servitude Act 1864. Transportation remained largely unavailable but three and four-year penal servitude sentences were abolished and replaced by five-year minimum sentences. The act also compelled the police to monitor prisoners released on licence.

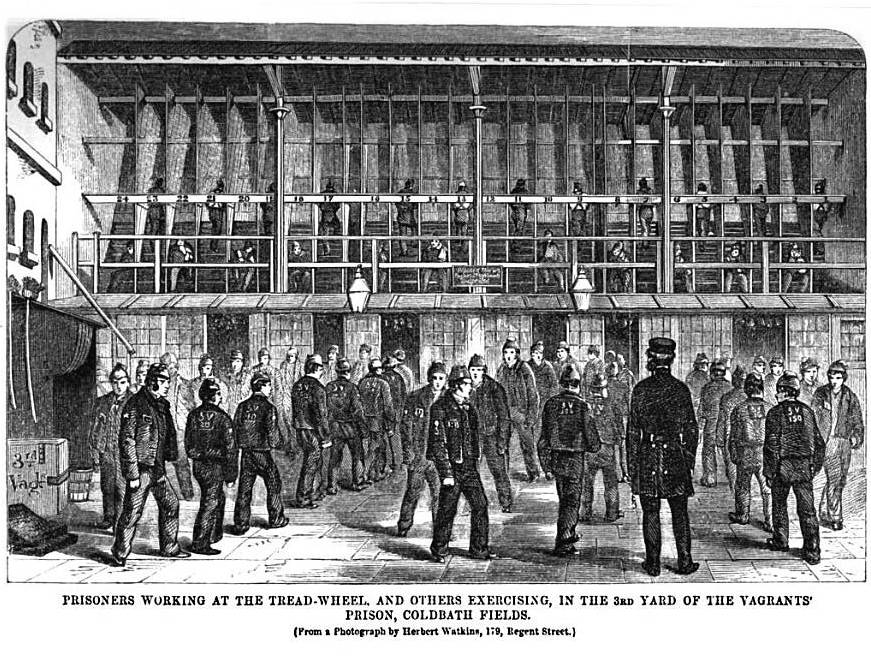
Treadmill at Coldbath Fields Prison, 1864

A House of Lords select committee on prison discipline was set up and reported in July 1863. It recommended harsher prison conditions, the so-called "hard fare, hard bed and hard work" regime, be implemented as a deterrent to criminals. Under the subsequent Prison Act 1865, prisoners were to be prevented from communicating with one another, to be chained and bound more often, to be provided hard planks to sleep on, and given deliberately plain food. Hard labour was defined as time spent on the penal treadmill, crank machine, capstan or on shot drill (passing cannonballs along a line); deliberately monotonous and pointless work. This returned prison life to the harsh standards of the early 19th century, undoing decades of reform which had sought to transfer the prison from a place of punishment to a place of rehabilitation. The harsh measures remained in force until the Prisons Act 1898 which implemented reforms. The moral panic of 1862–63 therefore caused harsh prison conditions to be inflicted upon hundreds of thousands of prisoners for decades.

The Garrotters Act, also known as the Security from Violence Act, was also passed in July 1863 and specifically targeted street robbery. This undid reforms passed by a select committee of 1861 which abolished flogging for most offences and implemented bans on repeated flogging (of 50 lashes a time) for a single offence. Under the Security from Violence Act garrotters faced being flogged three times for each offence. This act, which remained on the statute books until the Criminal Justice Act 1948, was described by Grey as "panic legislation [passed] after the panic had subsided".

== Legacy ==
Social historian Rob Sindall describes the garrotting panics as perhaps the first moral panics in Britain. Turner et al. writing in 2017 consider that the panics had little founding in reality and were largely manufactured by the press. They consider that the increase in violent street robberies observed in the crime statistics is because the police responded by focusing their resources into this area. This increase in recorded crime, as reported in the press, may have led to increase fears. Sindall considers that the criticism of the police for failing to prevent street robbery is not justified.

The panics led, by pressure on politicians from the middle classes, to Parliament passing poorly thought-out legislation that was reactionary and ineffective. Outbreaks of garrotting occurred in Liverpool in the 1880s and 1890s and 72 people were flogged for the offence, though with little apparent deterrent effect. The move towards self-defence measures marks the last major attempt by the citizenry to take the lead in self-protection, reversing the general trend at the time to allow the police to adopt this role.

== Bibliography ==
- Sindall, R. (1987). "The London Garotting Panics of 1856 and 1862". Social History. 12 (3): 351–359. doi:10.1080/03071028708567694. ISSN 0307-1022. JSTOR 4285629.
- Turner, Jo; Taylor, Paul; Morley, Sharon; Corteen, Karen (2017). A Companion to the History of Crime and Criminal Justice. Bristol, UK: Policy Press. ISBN 978-1-4473-2586-4.
