= Sydney Henn =

English politician

Portrait by Walter Stoneman, 1919

Sir Sydney Herbert Holcroft Henn KBE MP (4 December 1861 – 21 October 1936) was a Conservative Party Member of Parliament for Blackburn from 1922 to 1929.

Henn was the son of Rev. John Henn, honorary Canon of Manchester. His younger brother, Percy Henn, became a noted Australian educationalist. After his education in England, Henn worked in Chile for 30 years for Duncan, Fox & Co., founded by David Duncan. He returned to England to retire, but resumed working during the First World War as director of army priority at the War Office from 1917 to 1919, and then director of Disposal Board at the Ministry of Munitions. He was appointed a Knight Commander of the Order of the British Empire in the 1918 Birthday Honours for his services during the war. Henn died in a London hospital, age 74, after falling and breaking his thigh in two places and contracting pneumonia.

Henn's nephew, Guy Henn, was a member of parliament in Western Australia.

Parliament of the United Kingdom
Preceded by Percy Dean and Sir Henry Norman	Member of Parliament for Blackburn; 1922–1929; With: Sir Henry Norman to 1923; John Duckworth from 1923	Succeeded by Thomas Gill and Mary Hamilton
