= Blackburn (constituency) =

Parliamentary constituency in the United Kingdom, 1955 onwards

- Borough constituency for the House of Commons
- Interactive map of boundaries since 2024
- Location within North West England
- County: Lancashire
- Population: 107,246 (2011 census)
- Electorate: 70,586 (March 2020)
- Major settlements: Blackburn

Current constituency
- Created: 1955
- Member of Parliament: Adnan Hussain (Independent)
- Seats: One
- Created from: Blackburn East and Blackburn West

1832–1950
- Seats: Two
- Type of constituency: Borough constituency
- Created from: Lancashire
- Replaced by: Blackburn East; Blackburn West

Blackburn is a constituency (Note: A borough constituency (for the purposes of election expenses and type of returning officer)) in Lancashire, England, which is represented in the House of Commons of the UK Parliament (Note: As with all constituencies, the constituency elects one Member of Parliament (MP) by the first past the post system of election at least every five years.) by independent politician Adnan Hussain. From 2015 to 2024 it was represented by Kate Hollern of the Labour Party and, from 1979 to 2015, by Jack Straw who served under the Labour leaders of Neil Kinnock and John Smith and the Labour governments of Tony Blair and Gordon Brown.

== Constituency profile ==
The Blackburn constituency is located in Lancashire and contains the large town of Blackburn. The town has an industrial heritage in textile manufacturing, especially cotton weaving. Coal mining also took place in the town.

Compared to national averages, house prices and household income in Blackburn are low and deprivation is high. Residents are less likely to be degree-educated and to work in professional jobs. The constituency is ethnically diverse; White and Asian people each make up 48% of the population. Asian residents primarily declared Pakistani (24%) or Indian (21%) origin, and almost all are Muslims.

The town is politically divided. At the most recent borough council election in 2024, residents in the north-eastern, predominantly Asian wards of the town elected independent councillors, whilst the mostly White wards of the south and west of the town were won by Conservative or Labour Party candidates. It is estimated that 55% of voters in the constituency favoured leaving the European Union in the 2016 referendum, slightly higher than the national figure of 52%.

== Boundaries ==
=== Historic ===
1832–1885: The township of Blackburn.

1885–1918: The existing parliamentary borough, and so much of the municipal borough of Blackburn as was not already included in the parliamentary borough.

1918–1950: the county borough of Blackburn.

1955–1974: The county borough of Blackburn wards of Park, St. John's, St. Jude's, St. Luke's, St. Matthew's, St. Michael's, St. Paul's, St. Silas's, St. Stephen's, St. Thomas's and Trinity.

2010–2024: The district of Blackburn with Darwen wards of Audley, Bastwell, Beardwood and Lammack, Corporation Park, Ewood, Higher Croft, Little Harwood, Livesey with Pleasington, Meadowhead, Mill Hill, Queen's Park, Roe Lee, Shadsworth with Whitebirk, Shear Brow and Wensley Fold.

Following the 2007 review of parliamentary representation in Lancashire in the run up to the 2010 United Kingdom general election, including the unitary authority of Blackburn with Darwen, the Boundary Commission for England made minor boundary changes to the existing constituency.

=== Current ===
Further to the 2023 review of Westminster constituencies which came into effect for the 2024 general election, the constituency is composed of the following wards of the Borough of Blackburn with Darwen (as they existed on 1 December 2020):

- Audley & Queen’s Park; Bastwell & Daisyfield; Billinge & Beardwood; Blackburn Central; Blackburn South East; Ewood; Little Harwood & Whitebirk; Livesey with Pleasington; Mill Hill & Moorgate; Roe Lee; Shear Brow & Corporation Park; Wensley Fold.

Minor changes to reflect changes to local authority ward structure.

The constituency encompasses the town of Blackburn in the North West of England. It borders four other constituencies: Ribble Valley to the north, Hyndburn to the east, Rossendale and Darwen to the south and Chorley to the west.

== History ==
Blackburn was first enfranchised by the Reform Act 1832, as a two-member constituency, and was first used at the 1832 general election. It was abolished for the 1950 general election, replaced by two single member constituencies, Blackburn East and Blackburn West.

Blackburn was re-established as a single-member constituency for the 1955 general election, partially replacing Blackburn East and Blackburn West. After its re-establishment, the constituency was initially a marginal, but Blackburn was later considered to be a Labour Party stronghold prior to the 2024 general election—up until that point, it had only elected Labour MPs since its recreation in 1955. In 2024 Blackburn was won by Adnan Hussain, an independent candidate who campaigned largely on the issue of the genocide of Palestinians during the Gaza war. Three other previously safe Labour seats saw similar results at that election, all of which had large Muslim populations.

The constituency of Blackburn has been represented by two prominent frontbenchers in the Cabinet: Barbara Castle, a First Secretary of State (amongst other roles) who stood down from this seat to become a Member of the European Parliament, and Jack Straw, who served as Home Secretary and then Foreign Secretary in the Blair government.

=== 1997 general election ===
Jack Straw's Conservative challenger in the 1997 general election, Geeta Sidhu-Robb, was filmed with a megaphone during the election campaign, exclaiming in Urdu or Gujarati: "Don't vote for a Jew, Jack Straw is a Jew. If you vote for him, you're voting for a Jew. Jews are the enemies of Muslims." Sidhu-Robb said that this was in response to racist campaigning by the Labour Party, who she accused of claiming that she was "against Islam". She felt that Labour were "making it personal", and she took particular umbrage as her husband was Muslim. Sidhu-Robb later said she wished she had not made those comments about Straw, saying she did so because she was "furious" and that she "didn't want racism and bigotry to play a part in anything that [she] had anything to do with." Nonetheless, her comments regarding Straw's religion resurfaced over 20 years later, when Sidhu-Robb was competing to be nominated as the Liberal Democrat candidate in the 2021 London Mayoral election, causing the Liberal Democrats to remove her from consideration for their candidacy.

=== 2005 general election ===
Blackburn's then MP, Straw, was primarily challenged in the 2005 general election by the Conservative Party, but the former British ambassador to Uzbekistan, Craig Murray, also stood for election in the seat as an independent. Murray said: "I've been approached by several people in the Asian community who are under huge pressure from Labour activists [talking up the BNP's chances] to apply for a postal vote rather than a ballot vote and then hand their postal vote over to the Labour party." Over 50% more people used postal votes in the 2005 general election in Blackburn than in 2001. The BNP had not stood in the previous two elections, but this time had a candidate, who polled 5.4% of the vote, and beat Murray to come fourth. Both were outperformed by the Liberal Democrats in third place, and the Conservatives, who remained second. Straw held on comfortably, albeit with a reduced majority; his winning vote share of 42% was the smallest since the seat became a single-member constituency until the 2024 result.

=== 2015 general election ===
In August 2011, Jack Straw claimed that he had no plans to retire, despite turning 65 earlier that month. Two years later, on 25 October 2013, Straw announced that he would stand down as Blackburn's MP at the next election. In March 2014, Kate Hollern was selected, via an all women shortlist, as the candidate for Labour for the 2015 general election, and held the seat.

== Members of Parliament ==
=== Two-member constituency (1832–1950) ===
Election	First member	First party	Second member	Second party
1832	William Feilden	Whig	William Turner	Whig
1841	William Feilden	Conservative	John Hornby	Conservative
1847	James Pilkington	Whig	John Hornby	Conservative
1852	James Pilkington	Whig	William Eccles	Radical
1853 by-election	James Pilkington	Whig	Montague Joseph Feilden	Whig
1857	James Pilkington	Whig	William Henry Hornby	Conservative
1859	James Pilkington	Liberal	William Henry Hornby	Conservative
1865	Joseph Feilden	Conservative	William Henry Hornby	Conservative
1869 by-election	Henry Feilden	Conservative	Edward Hornby	Conservative
1874	Henry Feilden	Conservative	William Edward Briggs	Liberal
1875 by-election	Daniel Thwaites	Conservative	William Edward Briggs	Liberal
1880	Sir William Coddington	Conservative	William Edward Briggs	Liberal
1885	Sir William Coddington	Conservative	Sir Robert Peel	Conservative
1886	Sir William Coddington	Conservative	William Hornby	Conservative
1906	Philip Snowden	Labour	William Hornby	Conservative
1910	Philip Snowden	Labour	Sir Thomas Barclay	Liberal
1910	Philip Snowden	Labour	Sir Henry Norman	Liberal
1918	Percy Dean	Coalition Conservative	Sir Henry Norman	Coalition Liberal
1922	Sir Sidney Henn	Conservative	Sir Henry Norman	National Liberal
1923	Sir Sidney Henn	Conservative	John Duckworth	Liberal
1929	Thomas Gill	Labour	Mary Hamilton	Labour
1931	Sir George Elliston	Conservative	Sir WD Smiles	Conservative
1945	John Edwards	Labour	Barbara Castle	Labour
1950	constituency abolished: see Blackburn East and Blackburn West			

=== Single member constituency (1955–present) ===
Election	Member	Party
1955	Barbara Castle	Labour
1979	Jack Straw	Labour
2015	Jack Straw	Independent
2015	Kate Hollern	Labour
2024	Adnan Hussain	Independent

== Elections ==
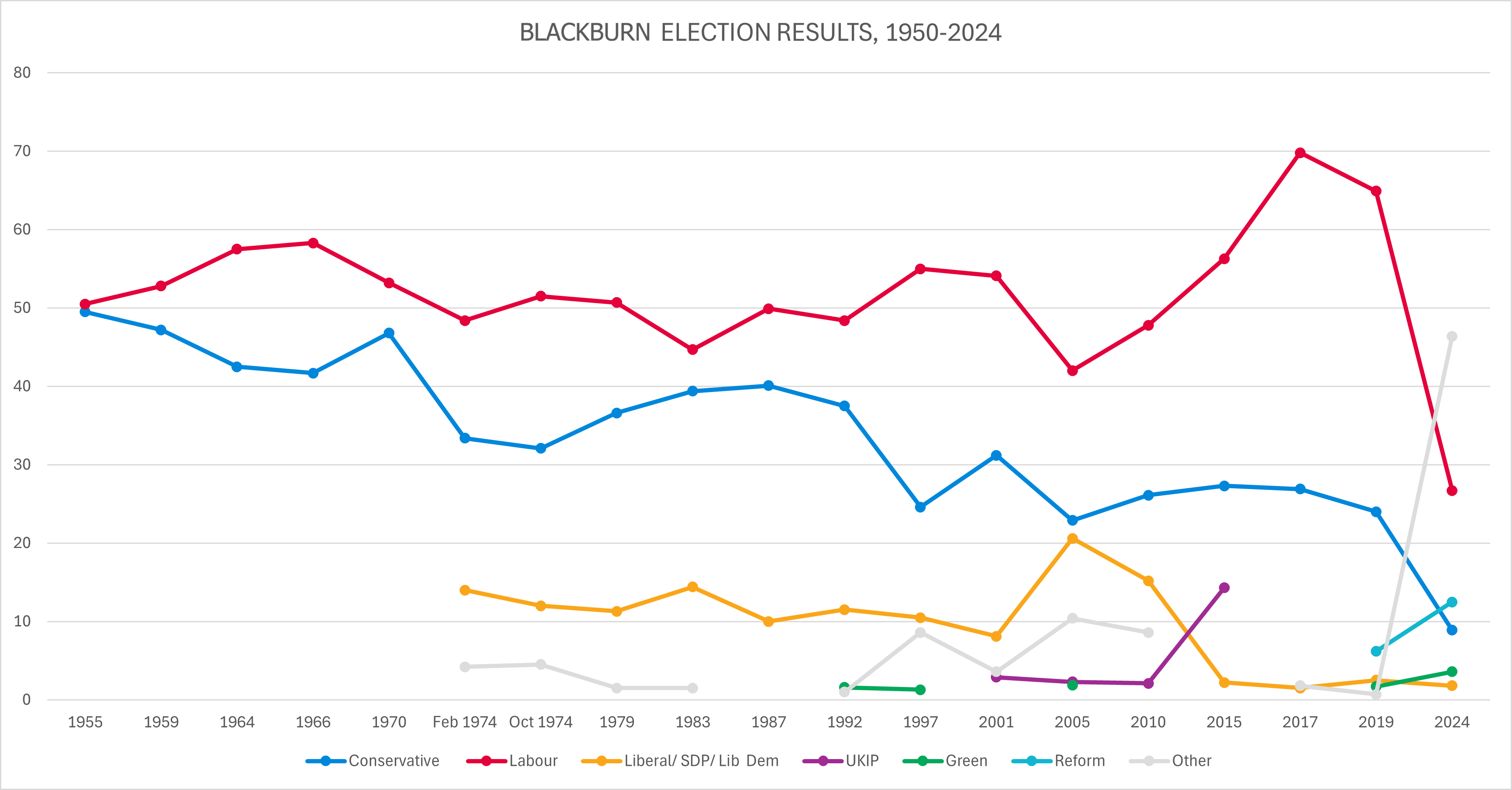
Election results 1955–2024

=== Elections in the 2020s ===
General election 2024: Blackburn
Party	Candidate	Votes	%	±%
Independent	Adnan Hussain	10,518	27.0	new
Labour	Kate Hollern	10,386	26.7	▼39.3
Workers Party	Craig Murray	7,105	18.3	new
Reform	Tommy Temperley	4,844	12.5	▲6.6
Conservative	Jamie McGowan	3,474	8.9	▼14.4
Green	Denise Morgan	1,416	3.6	▲2.0
Liberal Democrats	Adam Waller-Slack	689	1.8	▼0.6
Independent	Altaf Patel	369	0.9	new
Independent	Natasha Shah	86	0.2	new
Majority		132	0.3	
Turnout		38,887	53.1	▼8.7
Independent gain from Labour		Swing	▲	

=== Elections in the 2010s ===
General election 2019: Blackburn
Party	Candidate	Votes	%	±%
Labour	Kate Hollern	29,040	64.9	−4.9
Conservative	Claire Gill	10,736	24.0	−2.9
Brexit Party	Rick Moore	2,770	6.2	New
Liberal Democrats	Beth Waller-Slack	1,130	2.5	+1.0
Green	Reza Hossain	741	1.7	New
Independent	Rizwan Shah	319	0.7	N/A
Majority		18,304	40.9	−2.0
Turnout		44,736	62.8	−4.4
Labour hold		Swing	−1.0	

General election 2017: Blackburn
Party	Candidate	Votes	%	±%
Labour	Kate Hollern	33,148	69.8	+13.5
Conservative	Bob Eastwood	12,780	26.9	−0.4
Independent	Duncan Miller	875	1.8	New
Liberal Democrats	Irfan Ahmed	709	1.5	−0.7
Majority		20,368	42.9	+13.9
Turnout		47,512	67.2	+7.1
Labour hold		Swing	+6.9	

General election 2015: Blackburn
Party	Candidate	Votes	%	±%
Labour	Kate Hollern	24,762	56.3	+8.5
Conservative	Bob Eastwood	12,002	27.3	+1.2
UKIP	Dayle Taylor	6,280	14.3	+12.2
Liberal Democrats	Gordon Lishman	955	2.2	−13.0
Majority		12,760	29.0	+8.3
Turnout		43,999	60.1	−1.8
Labour hold		Swing	+3.7	

General election 2010: Blackburn
Party	Candidate	Votes	%	±%
Labour	Jack Straw	21,751	47.8	+5.7
Conservative	Michael Law-Riding	11,895	26.1	+3.5
Liberal Democrats	Paul English	6,918	15.2	−5.4
BNP	Robin Evans	2,158	4.7	−0.7
Independent	Bushra Irfan	1,424	3.1	N/A
UKIP	Bobby Anwar	942	2.1	−0.2
Independent	Grace Astley	238	0.5	N/A
Independent	Janis Sharp	173	0.4	N/A
Majority		9,856	21.7	+2.2
Turnout		45,499	62.9	+5.2
Labour hold		Swing	+1.1	

=== Elections in the 2000s ===
General election 2005: Blackburn
Party	Candidate	Votes	%	±%
Labour	Jack Straw	17,562	42.0	−12.1
Conservative	Imtiaz Ameen	9,553	22.9	−8.3
Liberal Democrats	Tony Melia	8,608	20.6	+12.5
BNP	Nicholas Holt	2,263	5.4	New
Independent	Craig Murray	2,082	5.0	N/A
UKIP	Dorothy Baxter	954	2.3	−0.6
Green	Graham Carter	783	1.9	New
Majority		8,009	19.1	−3.8
Turnout		41,805	56.9	+1.4
Labour hold		Swing	−1.4	

General election 2001: Blackburn
Party	Candidate	Votes	%	±%
Labour	Jack Straw	21,808	54.1	−0.9
Conservative	John Cotton	12,559	31.2	+6.6
Liberal Democrats	Imtiaz Patel	3,264	8.1	−2.4
UKIP	Dorothy Baxter	1,185	2.9	New
Socialist Labour	Terry Cullen	559	1.4	+0.1
Socialist Alliance	Jim Nichol	532	1.3	New
Independent	Paul Morris	377	0.9	New
Majority		9,249	22.9	−7.5
Turnout		40,284	55.5	−9.5
Labour hold		Swing	−2.9	

=== Elections in the 1990s ===
General election 1997: Blackburn
Party	Candidate	Votes	%	±%
Labour	Jack Straw	26,141	55.0	+6.6
Conservative	Geeta Sidhu Robb	11,690	24.6	−12.9
Liberal Democrats	Stephen Fenn	4,990	10.5	−1.0
Referendum	David Bradshaw	1,892	4.0	New
National Democrats	Tina Wingfield	671	1.4	New
Socialist Labour	Helen Drummond	635	1.3	New
Green	Robin Field	608	1.3	−0.3
Keep Britain Free and Independent Party	Margo Carmichael-Grimshaw	506	1.1	New
Common Sense Sick of Politicians	John Batchelor	362	0.8	New
Majority		14,451	30.4	+19.5
Turnout		47,495	65.0	−10.1
Labour hold		Swing	+9.7	

General election 1992: Blackburn
Party	Candidate	Votes	%	±%
Labour	Jack Straw	26,633	48.4	−1.5
Conservative	Ross M. Coates	20,606	37.5	−2.6
Liberal Democrats	Derek Mann	6,332	11.5	+1.5
Green	Robin Field	878	1.6	New
Lodestar Party	Margo Carmichael-Grimshaw	334	0.6	New
Natural Law	William Ayliffe	195	0.4	New
Majority		6,027	10.9	+1.1
Turnout		54,978	75.1	+0.2
Labour hold		Swing	+0.6	

=== Elections in the 1980s ===
General election 1987: Blackburn
Party	Candidate	Votes	%	±%
Labour	Jack Straw	27,965	49.9	+5.2
Conservative	Anne Cheetham	22,468	40.1	+0.7
SDP	Mohammed Ali	5,602	10.0	−4.4
Majority		5,497	9.8	+4.5
Turnout		56,035	74.9	+0.3
Labour hold		Swing	+2.3	

General election 1983: Blackburn
Party	Candidate	Votes	%	±%
Labour	Jack Straw	25,400	44.7	−6.0
Conservative	Graham Mather	22,345	39.4	+2.8
SDP	Eric B. Fairbrother	8,174	14.4	+2.7
National Front	David A. Riley	864	1.5	0.0
Majority		3,055	5.3	−8.8
Turnout		56,784	74.6	+0.5
Labour hold		Swing	−4.4	

=== Elections in the 1970s ===
General election 1979: Blackburn
Party	Candidate	Votes	%	±%
Labour	Jack Straw	19,683	50.7	−0.8
Conservative	Ian D. McGaw	14,193	36.6	+4.5
Liberal	Frank J. Beetham	4,371	11.3	−0.7
National Front	Edward Adamson	565	1.5	−3.0
Majority		5,490	14.1	−5.3
Turnout		38,813	74.0	+1.1
Labour hold		Swing	−2.6	

General election October 1974: Blackburn
Party	Candidate	Votes	%	±%
Labour	Barbara Castle	20,344	51.5	+3.1
Conservative	Ian D. McGaw	12,692	32.1	−1.3
Liberal	Frank J. Beetham	4,741	12.0	−2.0
National Front	John Kingsley Read	1,758	4.5	+0.3
Majority		7,652	19.4	+4.4
Turnout		39,537	72.9	−6.4
Labour hold		Swing	+2.2	

General election February 1974: Blackburn
Party	Candidate	Votes	%	±%
Labour	Barbara Castle	20,340	48.4	−4.8
Conservative	Ian D. McGaw	14,040	33.4	−13.4
Liberal	Frank J. Beetham	5,891	14.0	New
National Front	John Kingsley Read	1,778	4.2	New
Majority		6,300	15.0	+8.6
Turnout		42,049	78.3	+2.8
Labour hold		Swing	+4.3	

General election 1970: Blackburn
Party	Candidate	Votes	%	±%
Labour	Barbara Castle	22,473	53.2	−6.1
Conservative	Trixie Gardner	19,737	46.8	+6.1
Majority		2,736	6.4	−10.2
Turnout		42,210	75.5	−3.7
Labour hold		Swing	−6.1	

=== Elections in the 1960s ===
General election 1966: Blackburn
Party	Candidate	Votes	%	±%
Labour	Barbara Castle	25,381	58.3	+0.8
Conservative	Thomas Marsden	18,133	41.7	−0.8
Majority		7,248	16.6	+1.6
Turnout		43,514	79.2	−1.8
Labour hold		Swing	+1.6	

General election 1964: Blackburn
Party	Candidate	Votes	%	±%
Labour	Barbara Castle	26,543	57.5	+4.7
Conservative	John Maurice Armstrong Yerburgh	19,650	42.5	−4.7
Majority		6,893	15.0	+9.4
Turnout		46,193	81.0	−4.9
Labour hold		Swing	+4.7	

=== Elections in the 1950s ===
General election 1959: Blackburn
Party	Candidate	Votes	%	±%
Labour	Barbara Castle	27,356	52.8	+2.3
Conservative	John Maurice Armstrong Yerburgh	24,490	47.2	−2.3
Majority		2,866	5.6	+4.6
Turnout		51,846	85.9	+2.8
Labour hold		Swing	+2.3	

General election 1955: Blackburn
Party	Candidate	Votes	%	±%
Labour	Barbara Castle	26,241	50.5	
Conservative	Thomas Marsden	25,752	49.5	
Majority		489	1.0	
Turnout		51,993	83.1	
Labour win (new seat)				

Back to elections

=== Elections in the 1940s ===
General election 1945: Blackburn
Party	Candidate	Votes	%	±%
Labour	John Edwards	35,182	26.0	+2.1
Labour	Barbara Castle	35,145	26.0	+2.2
Conservative	Douglas Glover	26,325	19.5	−6.7
Conservative	Robert Goulborne Parker	25,807	19.1	−7.0
Liberal	Robert Shackleton	6,587	4.9	New
Liberal	Marjorie Annie Macinerney	6,096	4.5	New
Turnout		135,142	82.6	−2.3
Majority		8,857	6.5	N/A
Labour gain from Conservative		Swing		
Majority		9,338	6.9	N/A
Labour gain from Conservative		Swing		

General Election 1939–40: Another General Election was required to take place before the end of 1940. The political parties had been making preparations for an election to take place from 1939 and by the end of this year, the following candidates had been selected;

- Conservative: W. D. Smiles, George Elliston
- Labour: James Bell, William John Tout

Back to elections

=== Elections in the 1930s ===
General election 1935: Blackburn
Party	Candidate	Votes	%	±%
Conservative	George Elliston	37,932	26.2	−6.9
Conservative	W. D. Smiles	37,769	26.1	−7.0
Labour	James Bell	34,571	23.9	+6.9
Labour	George Walker	34,423	23.8	+7.2
Turnout		144,695	84.9	−2.5
Majority		3,509	2.4	−13.2
Conservative hold		Swing		
Majority		3,198	2.2	−13.9
Conservative hold		Swing		

General election 1931: Blackburn
Party	Candidate	Votes	%	±%
Conservative	W. D. Smiles	50,105	33.2	
Conservative	George Elliston	49,953	33.1	
Labour	Mary Hamilton	25,643	17.0	
Labour	Thomas Gill	25,030	16.6	
Turnout		150,551	87.4	
Majority		25,075	15.6	N/A
Conservative gain from Labour		Swing		
Majority		24,923	16.1	N/A
Conservative gain from Labour		Swing		

Back to elections

=== Elections in the 1920s ===
General election 1929: Blackburn (2 seats)
Party	Candidate	Votes	%	±%
Labour	Mary Hamilton	37,256	26.1	+4.3
Labour	Thomas Gill	35,723	25.0	+3.2
Unionist	Sydney Henn	35,249	24.7	−3.4
Liberal	Gerald Isaacs	34,504	24.2	−4.1
Turnout		142,732	87.8	−0.4
Majority		2,752	1.9	N/A
Majority		474	0.3	N/A
Labour gain from Unionist		Swing		
Labour gain from Liberal		Swing		

General election 1924: Blackburn (2 seats)
Party	Candidate	Votes	%	±%
Liberal	John Duckworth	31,612	28.3	−0.8
Conservative	Sydney Henn	31,347	28.1	+1.5
Labour	Mary Hamilton	24,330	21.8	−2.0
Labour	Thomas Gill	24,317	21.8	+1.3
Turnout		111,606	88.2	+3.2
Majority		7,017	6.3	+0.2
Unionist hold		Swing		
Majority		7,295	6.5	+1.2
Liberal hold		Swing		

General election 1923: Blackburn (2 seats)
Party	Candidate	Votes	%	±%
Liberal	John Duckworth	31,117	29.1	−5.3
Unionist	Sydney Henn	28,505	26.6	+1.1
Labour	John Davies	25,428	23.8	+2.1
Labour	Edward Porter	21,903	20.5	−0.6
Turnout		106,953	85.0	−3.4
Majority		6,602	6.1	+2.3
Unionist hold		Swing		
Majority		5,689	5.3	+2.0
Liberal hold		Swing		

General election 1922: Blackburn (2 seats)
Party	Candidate	Votes	%	±%
Unionist	Sydney Henn	28,280	25.5	−13.4
National Liberal	Henry Norman	27,071	24.4	−17.0
Labour	John Davies	24,049	21.7	
Labour	Edward Porter	23,402	21.1	
Liberal	Thomas Meech	8,141	7.3	N/A
Turnout		110,943	88.4	+13.6
Majority		3,669	3.8	−15.4
Unionist hold		Swing		
Majority		4,231	3.3	−18.4
National Liberal hold		Swing		

Back to elections

=== Elections in the 1910s ===
Henry Norman

General election 1918: Blackburn
Party		Candidate	Votes	%	±%
C	Liberal	Henry Norman	32,076	41.4	+15.1
C	Unionist	Percy Dean	30,158	38.9	−8.4
	Labour	Philip Snowden	15,274	19.7	−6.7
Turnout			77,510	74.8	−17.6
Majority			14,884	19.2	N/A
	Unionist gain from Labour		Swing	−0.9	
Majority			16,802	21.7	+19.4
	Liberal hold		Swing	+11.8	
C indicates candidate endorsed by the coalition government.

General election December 1910: Blackburn (two seats)
Party	Candidate	Votes	%	±%
Labour	Philip Snowden	10,762	26.4	−1.7
Liberal	Henry Norman	10,754	26.3	−2.1
Conservative	W.B. Boyd-Carpenter	9,814	24.0	+2.0
Conservative	H.L. Riley	9,500	23.3	+1.8
Turnout		40,830	92.4	−3.6
Registered electors		22,572		
Majority		948	2.4	−3.7
Labour hold		Swing	−1.9	
Majority		940	2.3	−4.1
Liberal hold		Swing	−2.1	

General election January 1910: Blackburn (two seats)
Party	Candidate	Votes	%	±%
Liberal	Thomas Barclay	12,064	28.4	+4.8
Labour	Philip Snowden	11,916	28.1	+1.4
Conservative	Robert Cecil	9,307	22.0	−4.8
Conservative	George Bowles	9,112	21.5	−1.8
Turnout		42,399	96.0	+0.6
Registered electors		22,572		
Majority		2,757	6.4	N/A
Liberal gain from Conservative		Swing	+4.9	
Majority		2,609	6.1	+2.7
Labour hold		Swing	+1.6	

Back to elections

=== Elections in the 1900s ===
General election 1906: Blackburn (two seats)
Party	Candidate	Votes	%	±%
Conservative	Harry Hornby	10,291	26.8	−13.7
Labour Repr. Cmte.	Philip Snowden	10,282	26.7	+2.1
Conservative	Geoffrey Drage	8,932	23.3	−10.6
Liberal	Edwin Hamer	8,892	23.2	New
Turnout		38,397	95.4	+9.6
Registered electors		21,127		
Majority		1,399	3.6	−4.9
Conservative hold		Swing	+4.9	
Majority		1,350	3.4	N/A
Labour Repr. Cmte. gain from Conservative		Swing	+6.4	

General election 1900: Blackburn (two seats)
Party	Candidate	Votes	%	±%
Conservative	Harry Hornby	11,247	40.5	+3.1
Conservative	William Coddington	9,415	33.9	−1.9
Labour Repr. Cmte.	Philip Snowden	7,096	25.6	New
Turnout		27,758	85.8	−1.8
Registered electors		19,496		
Majority		2,319	8.3	−0.7
Conservative hold		Swing	N/A	
Conservative hold		Swing	N/A	

Back to elections

=== Elections in the 1890s ===
General election 1895: Blackburn (two seats)
Party	Candidate	Votes	%	±%
Conservative	Harry Hornby	9,553	37.4	+8.6
Conservative	William Coddington	9,150	35.8	+7.8
Liberal	Thomas Ritzema	6,840	26.8	−16.4
Turnout		25,543	87.6	−4.5
Registered electors		18,275		
Majority		2,310	9.0	+3.5
Conservative hold		Swing	+12.5	
Conservative hold		Swing	+12.1	

General election 1892: Blackburn (two seats)
Party	Candidate	Votes	%	±%
Conservative	Harry Hornby	9,265	28.8	N/A
Conservative	William Coddington	9,046	28.0	N/A
Liberal	W. Taylor	7,272	22.5	New
Liberal	Eli Heyworth	6,694	20.7	New
Turnout		32,277	92.1	N/A
Registered electors		17,661		
Majority		1,774	5.5	N/A
Conservative hold		Swing	N/A	
Conservative hold		Swing	N/A	

Back to elections

=== Elections in the 1880s ===
General election 1886: Blackburn (two seats)
Party	Candidate	Votes	%	±%
Conservative	William Coddington	Unopposed		
Conservative	Harry Hornby	Unopposed		
Conservative hold				
Conservative hold				

Coddington

Briggs

General election 1885: Blackburn (two seats)
Party	Candidate	Votes	%	±%
Conservative	William Coddington	9,168	30.9	+5.5
Conservative	Robert Peel	8,425	28.4	+3.5
Liberal	William Edward Briggs	6,740	22.7	−3.3
Liberal	James Nuttall Boothman	5,341	18.0	−5.6
Majority		1,685	5.7	N/A
Turnout		15,656	95.9	+2.5 (est)
Registered electors		16,329		
Conservative hold		Swing	+5.6	
Conservative gain from Liberal		Swing	+3.4	

General election 1880: Blackburn (two seats)
Party	Candidate	Votes	%	±%
Liberal	William Edward Briggs	6,349	26.0	+0.6
Conservative	William Coddington	6,207	25.4	−0.9
Conservative	Daniel Thwaites	6,088	24.9	−0.4
Liberal	George Molesworth	5,760	23.6	+0.5
Turnout		12,202 (est)	93.4 (est)	−0.6
Registered electors		13,062		
Majority		261	1.1	+1.0
Liberal hold		Swing	+0.5	
Majority		447	1.8	+0.9
Conservative hold		Swing	−0.7	

Back to elections

=== Elections in the 1870s ===
By-election, 2 Oct 1875
Party	Candidate	Votes	%	±%
Conservative	Daniel Thwaites	5,792	54.5	+2.9
Liberal	J. T. Hibbert	4,832	45.5	−3.0
Majority		960	9.0	+8.1
Turnout		10,624	90.6	−3.4
Registered electors		11,721		
Conservative hold		Swing	+3.0	

- Caused by Feilden's death.

General election 1874: Blackburn
Party	Candidate	Votes	%	±%
Conservative	Henry Feilden	5,532	26.3	−0.1
Liberal	William Edward Briggs	5,338	25.4	+1.4
Conservative	Daniel Thwaites	5,323	25.3	−1.5
Liberal	Richard Shackleton	4,851	23.1	+0.3
Turnout		10,522 (est)	94.0 (est)	−5.6
Registered electors		11,195		
Majority		194	0.9	−1.5
Conservative hold		Swing	−0.2	
Majority		15	0.1	N/A
Liberal gain from Conservative		Swing	+1.5	

Back to elections

=== Elections in the 1860s ===
By-election, 30 March 1869: Blackburn
Party	Candidate	Votes	%	±%
Conservative	Edward Hornby	4,738	27.5	+0.7
Conservative	Henry Feilden	4,697	27.3	+0.9
Liberal	John Gerald Potter	3,964	23.0	−1.0
Liberal	John Morley	3,804	22.1	−0.7
Majority		733	4.3	+1.9
Turnout		8,602 (est)	93.7 (est)	−5.9
Registered electors		9,183		
Conservative hold		Swing	+0.9	
Conservative hold		Swing	+0.8	

- Caused by the 1868 election being declared void on petition after "undue influence by those who held the position of agents in the canvass".

General election, 1868: Blackburn
Party	Candidate	Votes	%	±%
Conservative	William Hornby	4,907	26.8	−5.0
Conservative	Joseph Feilden	4,826	26.4	−1.9
Liberal	John Gerald Potter	4,399	24.0	+6.6
Liberal	Montague Joseph Feilden	4,164	22.8	+0.3
Majority		427	2.4	−3.4
Turnout		9,148 (est)	99.6 (est)	+12.2
Registered electors		9,183		
Conservative hold		Swing	−5.8	
Conservative hold		Swing	−1.1	

General election, 1865: Blackburn
Party	Candidate	Votes	%	±%
Conservative	William Hornby	1,053	31.8	
Conservative	Joseph Feilden	938	28.3	
Liberal	James Pilkington	744	22.5	
Liberal	John Gerald Potter	577	17.4	
Majority		194	5.8	+2.0
Turnout		1,656 (est)	87.4 (est)	−4.8
Registered electors		1,894		
Conservative hold		Swing		
Conservative gain from Liberal		Swing		

Back to elections

=== Elections in the 1850s ===
General election, 1859: Blackburn
Party	Candidate	Votes	%	±%
Conservative	William Hornby	832	38.7	N/A
Liberal	James Pilkington	750	34.9	N/A
Liberal	John Patrick Murrough	567	26.4	N/A
Majority		82	3.8	N/A
Turnout		1,491 (est)	92.2 (est)	N/A
Registered electors		1,617		
Conservative hold		Swing	N/A	
Liberal hold		Swing	N/A	

General election, 1857: Blackburn
Party	Candidate	Votes	%	±%
Conservative	William Hornby	Unopposed		
Whig	James Pilkington	Unopposed		
Registered electors		1,518		
Conservative gain from Radical				
Whig hold				

By-election, 24 March 1853: Blackburn
Party	Candidate	Votes	%	±%
Whig	Montague Joseph Feilden	631	52.4	+8.7
Conservative	William Hornby	574	47.6	+21.3
Majority		57	4.8	−8.9
Turnout		1,205	90.9	+14.0
Registered electors		1,325		
Whig gain from Radical		Swing	−6.3	

- Caused by Eccles' election being declared void on petition, due to bribery.

General election, 1852: Blackburn
Party	Candidate	Votes	%	±%
Whig	James Pilkington	846	43.7	+8.4
Radical	William Eccles	580	30.0	+26.0
Conservative	John Hornby	509	26.3	−11.3
Turnout		968 (est)	76.9 (est)	+0.9
Registered electors		1,258		
Majority		266	13.7	−17.6
Whig hold		Swing	+7.0	
Majority		71	3.7	N/A
Radical gain from Conservative		Swing	+15.8	

Back to elections

=== Elections in the 1840s ===
General election, 1847: Blackburn
Party	Candidate	Votes	%	±%
Conservative	John Hornby	641	37.6	−28.5
Whig	James Pilkington	602	35.3	+18.8
Whig	William Hargreaves	392	23.0	+6.5
Chartist	William Prowting Roberts	68	4.0	New
Turnout		852 (est)	76.0 (est)	−12.9
Registered electors		1,121		
Majority		39	2.3	+2.2
Conservative hold		Swing	−26.9	
Majority		534	31.3	N/A
Whig gain from Conservative		Swing	+16.5	

General election, 1841: Blackburn
Party	Candidate	Votes	%	±%
Conservative	William Feilden	441	34.1	New
Conservative	John Hornby	427	33.0	New
Whig	William Turner	426	32.9	−21.9
Turnout		805	88.9	+18.9
Registered electors		906		
Majority		15	1.2	N/A
Conservative gain from Whig		Swing	−20.7	
Majority		1	0.1	N/A
Conservative gain from Whig		Swing	−11.3	

Back to elections

=== Elections in the 1830s ===
General election, 1837: Blackburn
Party	Candidate	Votes	%	±%
Whig	William Turner	515	54.8	+13.7
Whig	William Feilden	416	44.3	+14.2
Radical	John Benjamin Smith	9	1.0	−27.8
Turnout		589	70.0	−11.2
Registered electors		842		
Majority		99	10.5	−0.5
Whig hold		Swing	+13.8	
Majority		407	43.3	+42.0
Whig hold		Swing	+14.1	

General election, 1835: Blackburn
Party	Candidate	Votes	%	±%
Whig	William Turner	432	41.1	+8.3
Whig	William Feilden	316	30.1	−5.5
Radical	John Bowring	303	28.8	−2.8
Turnout		618	81.2	−15.8
Registered electors		761		
Majority		116	11.0	+9.8
Whig hold		Swing	+4.9	
Majority		13	1.3	−1.5
Whig hold		Swing	−2.1	

General election, 1832: Blackburn
Party	Candidate	Votes	%	±%
Whig	William Feilden	376	35.6	
Whig	William Turner	346	32.8	
Radical	John Bowring	334	31.6	
Turnout		607	97.0	
Registered electors		626		
Majority		30	2.8	
Whig win (new seat)				
Majority		12	1.2	
Whig win (new seat)				

Back to elections

== See also ==
- List of parliamentary constituencies in Lancashire
- Blackburn East (UK Parliament constituency) 1950–1955
- Blackburn West (UK Parliament constituency) 1950–1955
