= Harry Gill (politician) =

British politician (1885–1955)

Sir Harry Gill

President of the International Co-operative Alliance
- In office 1948–1955
- Preceded by: Robert Palmer
- Succeeded by: Marcel Brot

President of Co-operative Congress
- In office 1949–1949
- Preceded by: A.J. Tapping
- Succeeded by: J.W. Blower

Member of Parliament for Blackburn
- In office 30 May 1929 – 7 October 1931
- Preceded by: Sir Sidney Henn
- Succeeded by: Sir George Elliston

Personal details
- Born: Thomas Harry Gill; 5 December 1885 Hutton Cranswick, East Riding of Yorkshire, England
- Died: 20 May 1955 (aged 69)
- Party: Labour

Sir Thomas Harry Gill (5 December 1885 – 20 May 1955) was a British Labour Party politician, and Member of Parliament for Blackburn from 1929 to 1931.

Born at Hutton Cranswick, Gill was educated at Driffield Grammar School. He became active in the Railway Clerks' Association, serving as its president from 1919 until 1932. He was also prominent in the York Co-operative Society, serving as its president in 1916.

Gill was a supporter of the Labour Party, for which he stood unsuccessfully in York in 1918 and 1922, then switched to contest Blackburn. He was again unsuccessful in 1924, but won the seat in 1929, before losing it in 1931.

Out of Parliament, Gill focused his time on the co-operative movement, serving on the board of the Co-operative Wholesale Society from 1932 to 1951, and as its president in 1948, as president of the Co-operative Congress in 1949, and also as president of the International Co-operative Alliance from 1948 to 1955.

From November 1948 to January 1949 he was a member of the British delegation of the Committee for the Study of European Unity, convened by the Brussels Treaty Organisation to draw up the blueprint of the future Council of Europe.

He was knighted in the 1950 King's Birthday Honours List.

Parliament of the United Kingdom
Preceded by Sir Sydney Henn and John Duckworth	Member of Parliament for Blackburn; 1929–1931; With: Mary Hamilton	Succeeded by W. D. Smiles and George Elliston
Trade union offices
Preceded by W. E. Williams	President of the Railway Clerks' Association; 1919–1932	Succeeded by Fred Simpson
Non-profit organization positions
Preceded by Robert Palmer	President of the International Co-operative Alliance; 1948–1955	Succeeded by Marcel Brot
