= Walter Smiles =

Irish politician

Member of Parliament for North Down
- In office 23 February 1950 – 31 January 1953
- Preceded by: Constituency recreated John Morrow Simms (1922)
- Succeeded by: Patricia Ford

Member of Parliament for Down
- In office 5 July 1945 – 3 February 1950
- Preceded by: Viscount Castlereagh
- Succeeded by: Constituency Abolished; Himself (North Down)

Member of Parliament for Blackburn
- In office 27 October 1931 – 15 June 1945
- Preceded by: Mary Hamilton
- Succeeded by: Barbara Castle

Personal details
- Born: Walter Dorling Smiles; 8 November 1883 Belfast, Ireland
- Died: 31 January 1953 (aged 69) Donaghadee, Northern Ireland
- Party: Ulster Unionist Party
- Children: Patricia
- Profession: Soldier

Lieutenant-Colonel Sir Walter Dorling Smiles CIE DSO & Bar DL (8 November 1883 – 31 January 1953) was a Northern Irish politician.

Sir Walter was the son of William Holmes Smiles, director of Belfast Ropeworks, and grandson of Samuel Smiles. Sir Walter served during the First World War and, in the 1920s, managed a tea estate in Assam, there he became involved in local government and was a member of the Assam Legislative Council.

During the First World War; he obtained a pilot's certificate but due to the lack of aircraft he transferred to Royal Naval Armoured Car Division. In 1915 he joined the British Armoured Car Expeditionary Force which was seconded to the Imperial Russian Army to fight against Turkish forces in the Caucasus Campaign. In 1918 he had reached the rank of lieutenant commander and was highly decorated; he received the DSO in 1916, with bar in 1917 and a MID, along with Russian and Romanian decorations; such as the St George of the 4th class. He was appointed a Companion of the Order of the Indian Empire (CIE) in the 1925 Birthday Honours.

He was Conservative Member of Parliament (MP) for Blackburn from 1931 to 1945. Smiles was re-elected in 1935 but stood for Down in Northern Ireland at the 1945 Westminster election, as a Unionist. The two-seat constituency was split in 1950 into North Down and South Down. Smiles won North Down that year and remained its MP until his death in 1953; he lost his life in the sinking of MV Princess Victoria off Larne Lough, in the Great Storm. He was succeeded by his daughter, Patricia Ford. He is the great-grandfather of explorer Bear Grylls.

Parliament of the United Kingdom
Preceded by Mary Hamilton; Thomas Gill	Member of Parliament for Blackburn; 1931–1945; With: George Elliston	Succeeded by Barbara Castle; John Edwards
Preceded by James Little; Viscount Castlereagh	Member of Parliament for Down; 1945–1950; With: James Little 1945–1946; C. H. Mullan 1946–1950	Constituency divided
New constituency	Member of Parliament for Down, North; 1950–1953	Succeeded by Patricia Ford
