= Percy Dean =

Recipient of the Victoria Cross

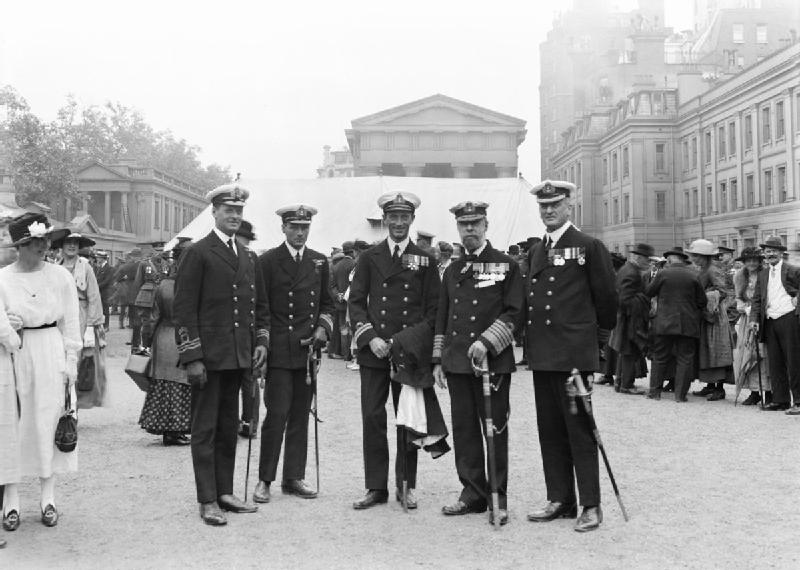
- Group of naval VC winners at Wellington Barracks hosted by King George V. Percy Dean is at left

Member of Parliament for Blackburn
- In office 14 December 1918 – 26 October 1922 Serving with Sir Henry Norman, 1st Baronet
- Monarch: George V
- Preceded by: Philip Snowden
- Succeeded by: Sydney Henn

Personal details
- Born: 20 July 1877 Blackburn, Lancashire, England
- Died: 20 March 1939 (aged 61) London, England
- Party: Conservative

Military service
- Allegiance: United Kingdom
- Branch/service: Royal Navy
- Rank: Lieutenant Commander
- Battles/wars: First World War
- Awards: Victoria Cross; Mentioned in Despatches

Percy Thompson Dean, VC (20 July 1877 – 20 March 1939) was a British businessman, politician, sailor, and a recipient of the Victoria Cross, the highest award for gallantry in the face of the enemy that can be awarded to British and Commonwealth forces, and also a politician.

== Victoria Cross ==
Dean was 40 years old and a lieutenant in the Royal Naval Volunteer Reserve during the First World War when the following deed took place for which he was awarded the VC.

On 22 and 23 April 1918 at Zeebrugge, Belgium, after Intrepid and Iphigenia had been scuttled, their crews were taken off by Motor Launch 282 commanded by Lieutenant Dean. He embarked more than 100 officers and men under constant and deadly fire from heavy and machine-guns at point blank range. This complete, he was about to clear the canal when the steering gear broke down, so he manoeuvred on his engines and was actually clear of the entrance to the harbour when he was told there was an officer in the water. He immediately turned back and rescued him.

Dean later achieved the rank of lieutenant commander.

== Post-war ==
After the war, Dean was elected at the 1918 general election as a Conservative Member of Parliament for Blackburn, serving until the 1922 general election. He was chairman of the Moelferna and Dee Side Slate and Slab Quarries Company in Wales between the wars.

Dean was one of 100 VC recipients to form the VC Guard of Honour at the State Funeral for the Unknown Warrior held on 11 November 1920.

Dean's VC was on display in the Lord Ashcroft Gallery at the Imperial War Museum, London until 2025. It may now be seen at the National Army Museum in Chelsea.

== Memorials ==
On 23 April 2003, a blue plaque was unveiled at Dean's former residence at 19 Gorse Street, Blackburn.

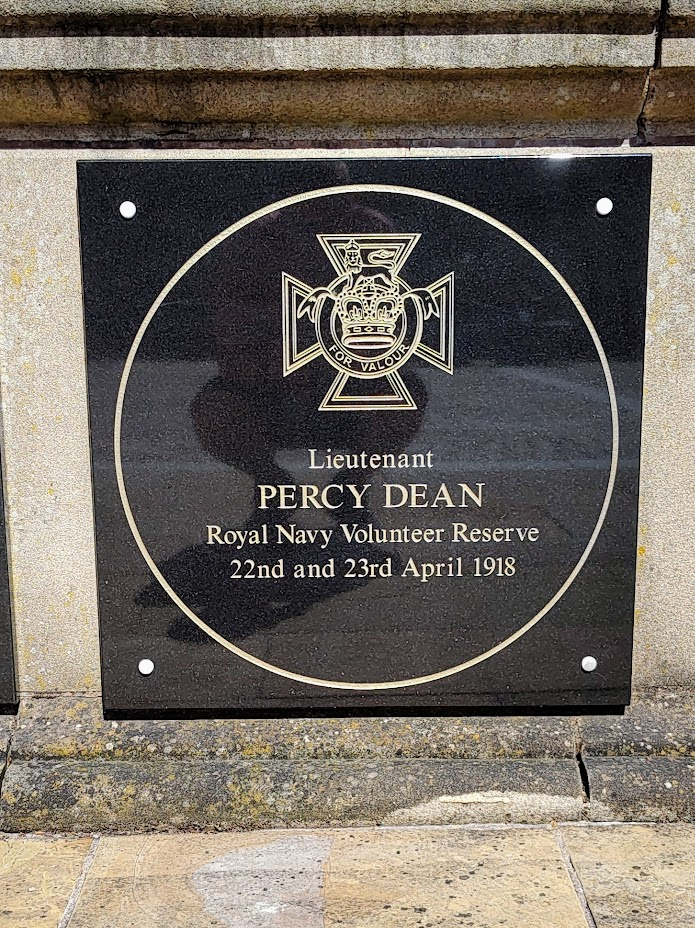
A plaque commemorating Percy Dean VC at the Town Hall, Blackburn, Lancashire

In April 2018, a stone was unveiled outside Blackburn Town Hall to recognise Dean in a ceremony attended by Dean's family and local dignitaries.

Parliament of the United Kingdom
Preceded by Philip Snowden; Sir Henry Norman	Member of Parliament for Blackburn; 1918–1922; With: Sir Henry Norman	Succeeded by Sir Henry Norman; Sydney Henn
