= British Armoured Car Expeditionary Force =

British Armoured Car Expeditionary Forces
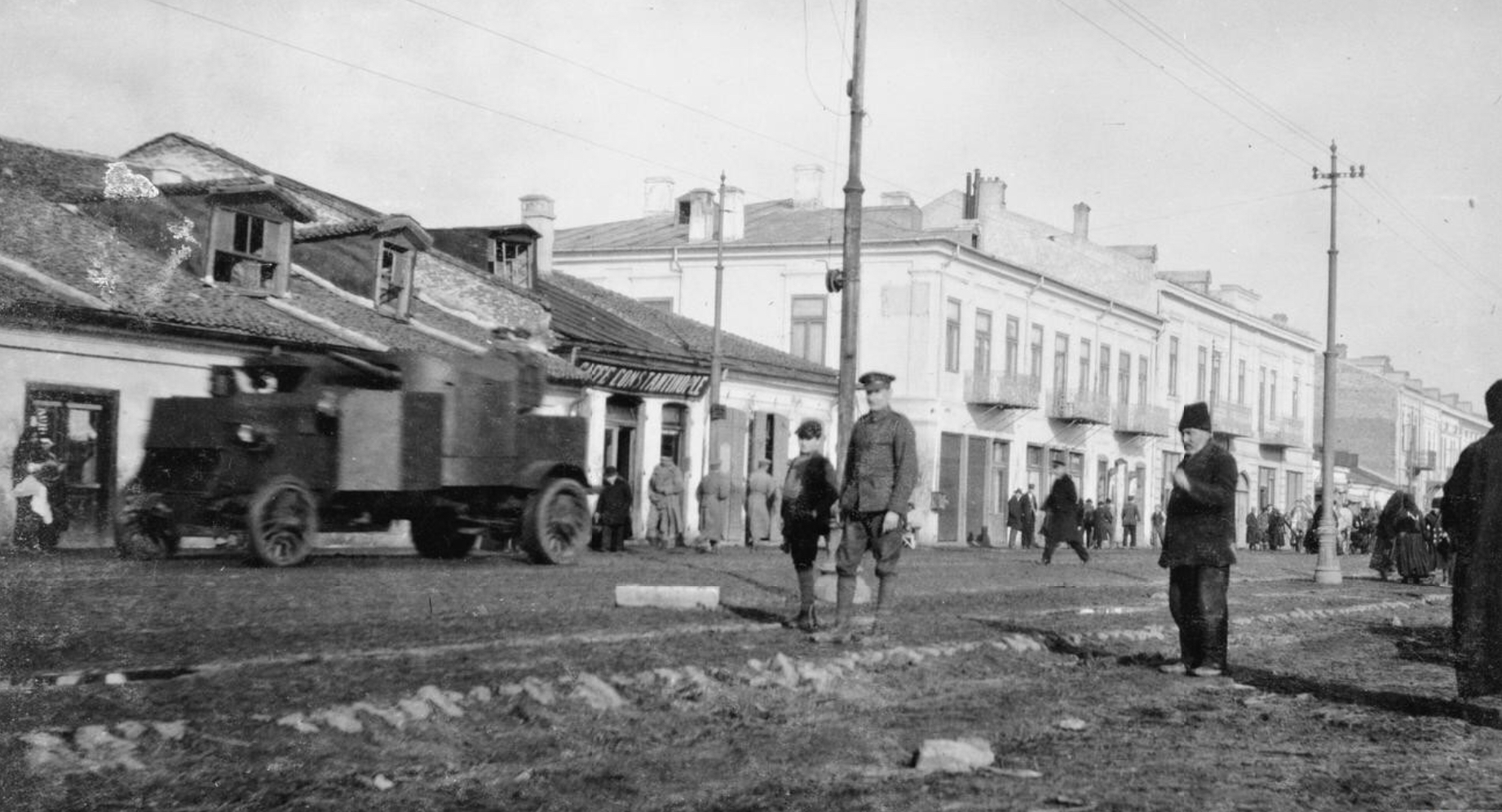
- Pierce-Arrow armoured lorry of the Russian Armoured Car Division in Galați, Romania
- Active: 1916–1918
- Country: British Empire

The British Armoured Car Expeditionary Force (ACEF) was a British military unit sent to Russia during the First World War. It fought alongside the Russian Empire on the Eastern Front between June 1916 and 1918. The unit consisted of 566 men.

== History ==
By the end of 1915, trench warfare on the Western Front meant that there was no scope for armoured cars to be stationed there. Three squadrons of armoured cars built by the Royal Naval Air Service were supposed to be sent by ship to Archangel in Russia to fight on the Eastern Front alongside Russia. However, sea ice prevented them from reaching Archangel, so the unit ended up at Alexandrovsk instead. The ACEF fought alongside the Imperial Russian Army in Galicia, Romania and the Caucasus Mountains until the Bolshevik coup of 1917, when the ACEF was withdrawn from Russia. See The Czars British Squadron by Bryan Perret, Anthony Lord published by William Kimber 1981

=== Notable personnel ===
- Oliver Locker-Lampson - commander of the unit
- Walter Smiles

● Commander William Wells-Hood, No 3 squadron
