= Thomas Barclay (economic writer) =

British economic writer and politician (1853–1941)

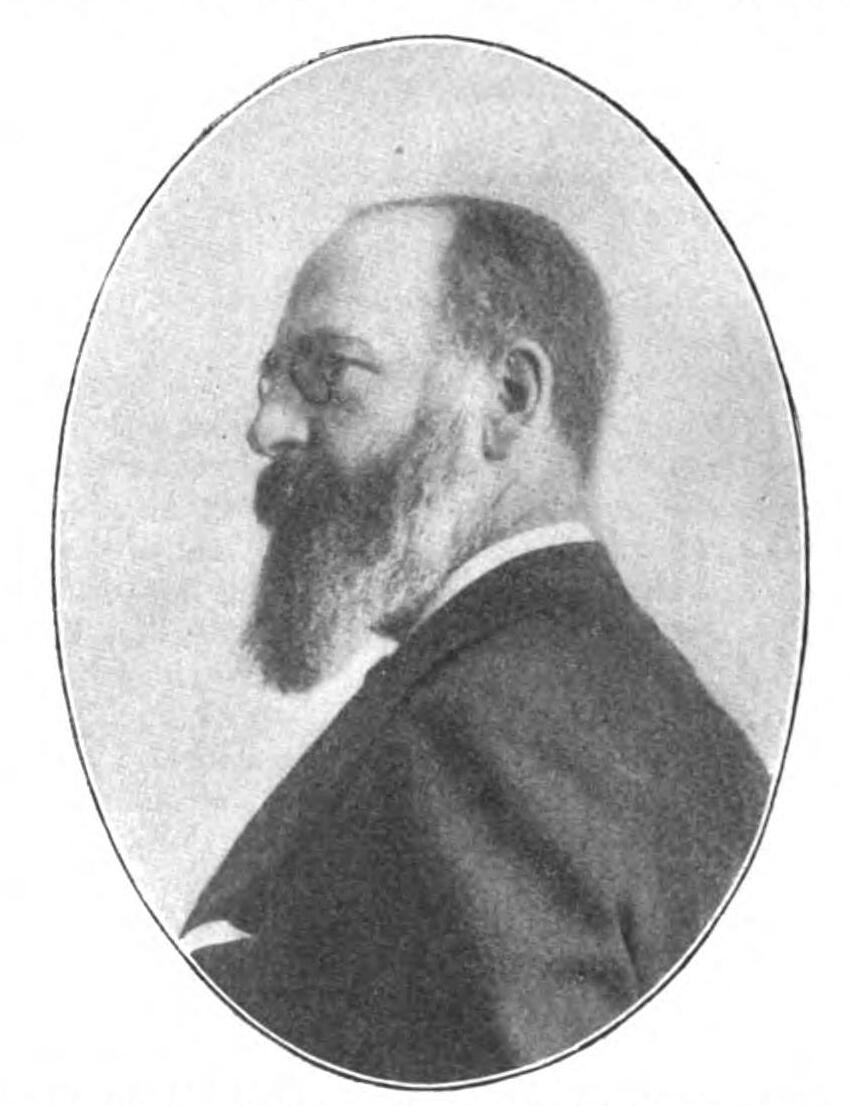
- Born: 20 February 1853
- Died: 20 January 1941 (aged 87); Versailles
- Education: Bachelor of Laws, Doctor of Philosophy
- Alma mater: University College London; Johanneum Gymnasium; University of Jena
- Occupation: Politician, writer, barrister
- Employer: The Times
- Political party: Liberal Party
- Children: 3
- Awards: Knight Bachelor (1904)
- Position held: member of the 29th Parliament of the United Kingdom (1910–1910), President of the Institut de Droit International (1919–)

Sir Thomas Barclay (20 February 1853 – 20 January 1941) was a distinguished authority on International Law, a writer on economic subjects and a British Liberal politician.

Barclay was born at Dunfermline in 1853, the eldest son of George Barclay of Cupar. He was educated at Cupar Academy, the College of Dunkirk, the Johanneum Classical School, Hamburg, University College, London, and the Universities of Paris and Jena. Initially he followed his father's footsteps in being a journalist for The Times having written articles for various newspapers from 1876 and he was posted to their Paris office. When he was called to the bar in 1881, he then devoted himself to a legal practice.

A former Liberal Unionist, he was a Member of Parliament (MP) for Blackburn (UK Parliament constituency) between the two general elections of 1910 (January and December). He was also a deputy Chairman of the International Law Association. From 1899 to 1900 he headed the British Chamber of commerce and economic work in France involving that helped lead to the Entente cordiale For these works he would be nominated for the Nobel Peace Prize in 1905, 1906, 1907, 1908, 1910, 1913, 1914, 1923, 1925, and 1928.

Barclay was knighted in the birthday honours of 1904. He was married to Marie Thérèse Teuscher, the translator of Villiers de l'Isle Adam's "La Révolte"; the couple had three children.

== Bibliography (selection) ==
- Companies in France: the law relating to British companies and securities in France and the formation of French companies, Sweet and Maxwell, London 1899.
- Problems of international practice and diplomacy with special reference to the Hague conferences and conventions and other general international agreements, Sweet and Maxwell, London 1907. (Read online)
- The turco-italian war and its problems, Constable & Company, London 1912. (Read online)
- Thirty Years. Anglo-French Reminiscences (1876-1906), Houghton Mifflin Company, Boston and New York 1914. (Read online)
- Angleterre et France - Fraternité en guerre, alliance dans la paix, avant-propos de Gabriel Hanotaux, Bloud & Gay, Paris and Barcelone 1916.
- New Methods of adjusting international disputes and the future, Constable & Company, London 1917. (Read online)
- Le roi George V d'Angleterre, Bloud & Gay, Paris and Barcelone 1917.
- Arbitrage et relations internationales après la paix, (Traduit par Charles Furby), Ernest Flammarion, Paris 1918.
- Le président Wilson et l'évolution de la politique étrangère des États-Unis, Armand Colin, Paris 1918. (Read online)
- Collapse and Reconstruction. European conditions and american principles, Little-Brown and Company, Boston 1919. (Read online)

Parliament of the United Kingdom
| Preceded by Sir Philip Snowden and William Henry Hornby | Member of Parliament for Blackburn; Jan. 1910–Dec. 1910; With: Philip Snowden | Succeeded by Philip Snowden and John Duckworth |
