= William Turner (Blackburn MP) =

English politician

William Turner (1777 – 17 July 1842) was an English Liberal Party politician who sat in the House of Commons from 1832 to 1841.

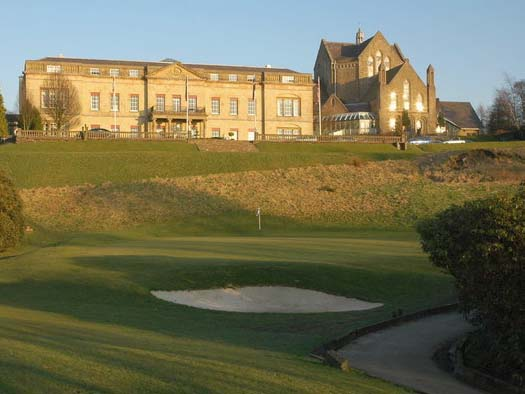
Shrigley Hall in 2008

== Life ==
Turner was the youngest of four sons of a family that arrived in Blackburn at the beginning of the nineteenth century and opened a calico printing works at Mill Hill. Turner married his cousin Jane and acquired an estate at Shrigley Hall in Cheshire. He served as High Sheriff of Cheshire in 1826. In 1826 his only daughter Ellen was tricked into eloping with Edward Gibbon Wakefield, an unscrupulous fortune hunter. They married in Gretna Green. The case was known as the Shrigley abduction, and the marriage was later annulled by the House of Lords. Wakefield was jailed for three years.

The Turners were popular in Blackburn and William was much liked as an employer. At the 1832 general election, he ran for the newly created constituency of Blackburn, "almost like a bomb shell, offering himself to the Free and independent electors of both parties". He made an election speech outside the Old Bull Hotel to a large crowd of working men, saying, "Gentlemen, They said I wouldn’t come; but I am come, and will be here at the day of the election. I'll stand the contest. It rains; it will wet you and will wet me. Good night. Give us three cheers." He then went into the inn and bought barrels of beer for the crowds. Turner was elected as a Member of Parliament (MP) for Blackburn and held the seat until the 1841 general election, when he was defeated by the Conservative Party candidate John Hornby.

In 1833, William and his wife built almshouses on Bank Top Blackburn.

Turner died at his home in Mill Hill at the age of 65 and was buried in St. Johns churchyard Blackburn.

Parliament of the United Kingdom
New constituency	Member of Parliament for Blackburn; 1832 – 1841; With: William Feilden	Succeeded by John Hornby; William Feilden
