= William Eccles (MP) =

British Radical politician

Member of Parliament for Blackburn
- In office 8 July 1852 – 24 February 1853 Serving with James Pilkington
- Preceded by: James Pilkington; John Hornby
- Succeeded by: James Pilkington; Montague Joseph Feilden

Personal details
- Born: 1794
- Died: 17 June 1853 (aged 58)
- Party: Radical

William Eccles (1794 – 17 June 1853) was a British Radical politician.

Eccles was elected Radical MP for Blackburn at the 1852 general election but was unseated shortly in 1853 due to bribery. He died just a few months later.

Parliament of the United Kingdom
Preceded by James Pilkington; John Hornby	Member of Parliament for Blackburn; 1852–1853; With: James Pilkington	Succeeded by James Pilkington; Montague Joseph Feilden
