= George Elliston (politician) =

Captain Sir George Sampson Elliston MC (27 July 1875, Ipswich – 21 February 1954) was Conservative Member of Parliament (MP) for Blackburn from 1931 to 1945.

Ellison was educated at Ipswich School, Framlingham College, Ayerst Hostel, Cambridge, and St Catharine's College, Cambridge, graduating BA in 1896. He was called to the Bar from Lincoln's Inn in 1901. However, he subsequently became a doctor by profession and served with the Royal Army Medical Corps during and after the First World War.

First elected MP for Blackburn in 1931, Elliston was re-elected in 1935. His brother was the Liberal politician William Rowley Elliston.

Parliament of the United Kingdom
Preceded by Mary Hamilton and Thomas Gill	Member of Parliament for Blackburn; 1931–1945; With: Sir W. D. Smiles	Succeeded by Barbara Castle and John Edwards
