= Mary Hamilton (politician) =

British politician

Mary Hamilton CBE
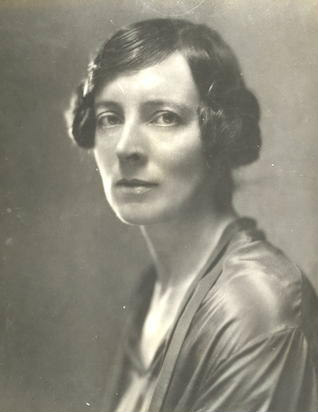

Member of Parliament for Blackburn with Thomas Gill
- In office 30 May 1929 – 26 October 1931
- Prime Minister: Stanley Baldwin
- Preceded by: Sir Sydney Henn and John Duckworth
- Succeeded by: W. D. Smiles and George Elliston

Personal details
- Born: 8 July 1882
- Died: 10 February 1966 (aged 83)
- Party: Labour
- Education: Newnham College Cambridge

Mary Agnes Hamilton CBE (née Adamson, 8 July 1882 – 10 February 1966) was a writer, journalist, broadcaster, civil servant, and the Labour Member of Parliament for Blackburn from 1929 to 1931. She headed the American Division of the Ministry of Information and then of the Foreign Office from no later than 1946 until 1952, and worked for the Information Research Department.

== Early life ==
Mary Agnes Adamson (known as Molly), was born in Withington, Manchester, the eldest of six children of Scottish parents: Robert Adamson, a professor of logic at Glasgow University, and his wife Margaret, née Duncan, a Quaker who had been a teacher of botany at Manchester High School for Girls before their marriage in 1881. The family moved back to Scotland in 1889.

== Education ==
She was educated at Aberdeen and Glasgow Girls' High Schools before attending the University of Kiel in 1901 for seven months to learn German. She went up to Newnham College, Cambridge (where her mother had also been a student) in 1901 to read classics, then economics as part of the history tripos, graduating in 1904 with first-class honours.

== Career ==
=== Journalism ===
Mary Agnes Hamilton was a prolific writer. During the 1910s she supported herself through journalism, translating works from French and German, and publishing books on ancient history and American presidents for children. In the 1920s, she wrote for journals including the Review of Reviews and Time and Tide. She moved in literary circles with Leonard and Virginia Woolf and the Strachey family; provided research assistance to Lawrence and Barbara Hammond in Hertfordshire; and met regularly with intellectuals and economists while living near Fleet Street during the 1920s, including John Reeve Brooke, Dominick Spring-Rice, Rose Macaulay, Naomi Royde Smith, and William Arnold-Forster.

Hamilton published short, sympathetic biographies of two women trade unionists, Margaret Bondfield and Mary Macarthur, and, under the pseudonym 'Iconoclast', a portrait of Ramsay MacDonald. In 1922, at MacDonald's instigation, she briefly and unhappily became assistant editor of the I.L.P.'s journal Labour Leader under the left-wing editor, H. N. Brailsford.

In 1916 Hamilton caused some controversy by writing an anti-war novel, Dead Yesterday.

=== Politics ===
She stood unsuccessfully for Labour in the 1923 and 1924 general elections. In the 1929 general election Mary Agnes Hamilton won one of two seats for Blackburn, securing the highest number of votes of any Labour woman candidate. She made her mark in parliament with a series of notable speeches, during which she always wore red shoes.

Hamilton was appointed a delegate to the League of Nations in Geneva, where in 1929 and 1930 she worked on the Refugees Commission and the International Committee on Intellectual Cooperation. In 1930–31, she was also parliamentary private secretary to the Postmaster General, Clement Attlee, who wrote to The Times upon her death that she was 'one of the ablest women who entered the House of Commons'.

Mary Agnes Hamilton did not join the National Government in August 1931, and was instead elected to the Labour Party's parliamentary executive. She lost her seat in the 1931 general election, having become increasingly critical of Labour's unemployment policies, and never returned to Westminster.

Mary Agnes Hamilton also worked on the Balfour Committee on Industry and Trade 1924–29, and the Royal Commission on the Civil Service, 1929–1931. In 1937 she was elected an alderman on the Labour-controlled London County Council.

=== Civil Service ===
Mary Agnes Hamilton worked for the General Production division of the Ministry of Information from February 1940 to February 1941. She then transferred to the Reconstruction Secretariat, later the Ministry of Reconstruction, where she served on planning committees for education, housing, employment, and the Beveridge Report. In May 1944 she returned to work for the Overseas Department of the Ministry of Information.

In August 1946, the American Division, of which she was then in charge, was transferred to the Foreign Office, where she stayed until she left the civil service in February 1952. She worked for the Information Research Department, the Foreign Office's covert anti-Communist propaganda branch, and was the IRD's contact for Judith Hare, Countess of Listowel. Hamilton was made a CBE for this work in 1949.

=== Broadcasting ===
Hamilton presented the first Week in Westminster for the BBC in 1929. She continued to give talks on current affairs and professional careers for women, among many other topics, during the 1930s and 1940s, and was made a governor of the BBC, 1933–1937, and a member of the Brains Trust.

== Personal life ==
In September 1905 she married Charles Joseph Hamilton, an economist colleague at the University of South Wales, Cardiff, where she had briefly been employed as a history tutor. She petitioned for and obtained a divorce in 1914.

== Further Information ==
In 2000, Female student members of the University of Glasgow's Student Representative Council renamed the Boyd Orr Building in her honour for International Women's Day. The women's convener of the Council said the idea was "to raise awareness of women's achievements and make people think about why there were no buildings named after women."

== Publications ==
- Incubation: or, The Cure of Disease in Pagan Temples and Christian Churches (London, 1906)
- The Story of Abraham Lincoln (London: T. C. & E. C. Jack, 1906)
- A Junior History of Rome (Oxford: Clarendon Press, 1910)
- Greek Legends (Oxford: Clarendon Press, 1912)
- Less than the Dust (London: William Heinemann, 1912)
- Outlines of Greek and Roman History to A.D. 180 (Oxford: Clarendon Press, 1913)
- Yes (London: William Heinemann, 1914)
- The Investment of Capital Abroad (London: Women's International League, 1915)
- Dead Yesterday (London: Duckworth, 1916)
- Full Circle (London: W. Collins, 1919)
- The Last Fortnight (London: W. Collins, 1920)
- The Principles of Socialism (London: Independent Labour Party Study Course Series, 1921)
- Follow My Leader (London: Jonathan Cape, 1922)
- Ancient Rome (Oxford: Clarendon Press, 1922)
- The Man of To-morrow: J. Ramsay MacDonald, under pseudonym ‘Iconoclast’ (London: Leonard Parsons, 1923)
- Margaret Bondfield, under pseudonym ‘Iconoclast’ (London: Leonard Parsons, 1924)
- Mary Macarthur: A Biographical Sketch (London: Leonard Parsons, 1925)
- Greece (Oxford: Clarendon Press, 1926)
- Thomas Carlyle (London: Leonard Parsons, 1926)
- Folly's Handbook (London: Jonathan Cape, 1927);
- Special Providence: A Tale of 1917 (London: Allen and Unwin, 1930)
- Murder in the House of Commons (London: Hamish Hamilton, 1931)
- In America To-Day (London: Hamish Hamilton, 1932)
- Sidney and Beatrice Webb: A Study in Contemporary Biography (London: Sampson Low, Marston, 1933)
- John Stuart Mill: Makers of the New World (London: Hamish Hamilton, 1933)
- (ed.) The Boat Train: By Fifteen Travellers (London: G. Allen and Unwin, 1934)
- Life Sentence (1935)
- 'Changes in Social Life' in Our Freedom and Its Results, by Five Women, ed. Ray Strachey (1936)
- Newnham: An Informal Biography (London: Faber & Faber, 1936)
- Arthur Henderson: A Biography (London: William Heinemann, 1938)
- The Labour Party To-Day: What it is and How it Works (London: Labour Party Book Service, 1939)
- Women at Work: A Brief Introduction to Trade Unionism for Women (London: G. Routledge, 1941)
- Remembering My Good Friends (London: Jonathan Cape, 1944)
- 'The Place of the United States of America in World Affairs', Fifth Montague Burton Lecture on International Relations, (University of Nottingham, 1947)
- Up-Hill All the Way: A Third Cheer for Democracy (London, Cape, 1953)

Parliament of the United Kingdom
Preceded by Sir Sydney Henn and John Duckworth	Member of Parliament for Blackburn; 1929–1931; With: Thomas Gill	Succeeded by W. D. Smiles and George Elliston
