= Sir William Coddington, 1st Baronet =

British politician

Coddington in 1895.

Sir William Coddington, 1st Baronet (1830 – 15 February 1918) was an English cotton manufacturer and Conservative politician who sat in the House of Commons from 1880 to 1906.

== Biography ==
Coddington was born at Salford, Lancashire, the eldest son of William Dudley Coddington, a Manchester merchant, and his wife Elizabeth Hopwood.

In 1842 his father settled in Blackburn as a cotton spinner and manufacturer. When his father died in 1867, Coddington was left the management of several mills. Under his supervision the firm flourished, as he took advantage of the trade boom which followed the end of the Lancashire Cotton Famine. He erected Wellington New Mills.

In 1875, he was Mayor of Blackburn and in that year, he presented an organ to the Parish Church at a cost of £3,000. He was elected as Member of Parliament (MP) for Blackburn at the 1880 general election. He held the seat until his retirement in 1906. In Parliament Sir William was remembered for his work as chairman of the Parliamentary Committee for widening the streets of London. He became a baronet, of Wycollar, on 17 February 1896.

Escutcheon of the Coddington baronets of Wycollar

In 1912, Coddington's services to the town of Blackburn were recognised by the grant of the Freedom of the Borough. He died at Wycollar at age 86.

== Personal life ==
Coddington married in 1864 Sarah Catherine, daughter of William Thomas Hall, of Wakefield, and they had one daughter. They lived firstly at Spring Mount and later at Wycollar, which had been built by his father. He married again in his 83rd year, his second wife being Aimee Josephine Barber-Starkie.

Parliament of the United Kingdom
| Preceded by Daniel Thwaites; William Edward Briggs | Member of Parliament for Blackburn; 1880–1906; With: William Edward Briggs1880–1885; Sir Robert Peel 1885–1886; William Henry Hornby 1886–1906 | Succeeded by Philip Snowden; William Henry Hornby |
Baronetage of the United Kingdom
| New creation | Baronet (of Wycollar); 1896–1918 | Extinct |
| Preceded by Lewis baronets | Coddington baronets of Wycollar; 17 February 1896 | Succeeded by Boord baronets |
