= John Hornby (MP) =

British politician

Member of Parliament for Blackburn
- In office 30 July 1841 – 8 July 1852 Serving with James Pilkington (1847–1852); William Feilden (1841–1847)
- Preceded by: William Feilden; William Turner
- Succeeded by: James Pilkington; William Eccles

Personal details
- Born: 19 August 1810 Blackburn, Lancashire, England
- Died: 5 December 1892 (aged 82)
- Party: Conservative

John Hornby (19 August 1810 – 5 December 1892) was a British Conservative politician.

Hornby was elected Conservative MP for Blackburn at the 1841 general election and held the seat until 1852.

Parliament of the United Kingdom
| Preceded by William Feilden; William Turner | Member of Parliament for Blackburn; 1841–1852; With: James Pilkington (1847–1852); William Feilden (1841–1847) | Succeeded by James Pilkington; William Eccles |
