= William Feilden =

English cotton manufacturer and politician

Sir William Feilden, 1st Baronet (13 March 1772 – 21 May 1850) was an English cotton manufacturer and a Whig and later Conservative politician who sat in the House of Commons from 1832 to 1847.

Feilden was the third son of Joseph Feilden and Margaret Leyland of Witton. He was educated at Blackburn Grammar School and Brasenose College, Oxford. He became a cotton mill owner and lived at Witton Hall. In 1798 he purchased the hamlet of Feniscowles south west of Blackburn, from Thomas Ainsworth.

At the 1832 general election, Feilden was elected as Whig Member of Parliament (MP) for Blackburn.

Feilden built the house of Feniscowles in Pleasington in a romantic valley on the banks of the River Darwen. He also gave a site for a church at Feniscowles in 1840, and provided the stone for its construction.

At the 1841 general election, Feilden changed his allegiance to the Conservatives but was re-elected and remained MP for Blackburn until the 1847 general election, when he did not stand. He did nothing to distinguish himself in the House of Commons in his fourteen years as a M.P. Feilden was created a baronet, of Feniscowles in the County Palatine of Lancaster on 21 July 1846.

Feilden died at the age of 78.

Feilden married Mary Haughton Jackson, daughter of Edmund Jackson, at St Martin in the Fields on 30 March 1797. They had three sons and three daughters. His son William succeeded to the baronetcy. Another son Montague Joseph Feilden also became MP for Blackburn. His youngest son, John Leyland Feilden was an author.

Parliament of the United Kingdom
New constituency	Member of Parliament for Blackburn; 1832 – 1847; With: William Turner to 1841; John Hornby from 1841	Succeeded by James Pilkington; John Hornby
Baronetage of the United Kingdom
New creation	Baronet (of Feniscowles)'; 1846–1850	Succeeded by William Henry Feilden
