= Montague Joseph Feilden =

British Liberal and Whig politician (1816–1898)

Member of Parliament for Blackburn
- In office 24 March 1853 – 27 March 1857 Serving with James Pilkington
- Preceded by: James Pilkington; William Eccles
- Succeeded by: James Pilkington; William Henry Hornby

Personal details
- Born: 8 May 1816 Feniscowles, Lancashire
- Died: 17 October 1898 (aged 82)
- Party: Liberal
- Other political affiliations: Whig
- Spouse(s): Alice Thoume (m. 1865) Mary Anne Valentine (m. 1846; died 1859)
- Children: 1
- Parents: William Feilden (father); Mary Haughton Jackson (mother)

Montague Joseph Feilden (8 May 1816 – 17 October 1898) was a British Liberal and Whig politician.

Born in Feniscowles, Lancashire, Feilden was the son of William and Mary Haughton (née Jackson) Feilden. He married firstly to Mary Anne Valentine, daughter of William Valentine, in 1846. After her death in 1859, he remarried to Alice Thoume, daughter of James Thoume, in 1865 and they had at least one child, Montague Leyland Feilden (1867–1900).

Feilden was elected Whig MP for Blackburn at a by-election in 1853—caused by the election of William Eccles being declared void on petition, due to bribery—and held the seat until 1857 when he did not seek re-election. He later attempted to regain the seat as a Liberal in 1868, but was unsuccessful.

Feilden was also a Lieutenant-Colonel in the 3rd Battalion, Loyal North Lancashire Regiment, a Deputy Lieutenant of Lancashire, and a Justice of the Peace for Lancashire.

Parliament of the United Kingdom
Preceded by James Pilkington; William Eccles	Member of Parliament for Blackburn; 1853–1857; With: James Pilkington	Succeeded by James Pilkington; William Henry Hornby
