= James Pilkington (politician) =

British businessman and politician (1804–1890)

James Pilkington JP DL
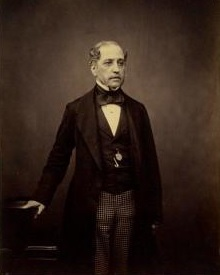
- Portrait, c. 1850s

Member of Parliament for Blackburn
- In office 29 July 1847 – 6 July 1865 Serving with: John Hornby (1847–1852); William Eccles (1852–1853); Montague Feilden (1853–1857); William H. Hornby (1857–1865)
- Preceded by: William Feilden
- Succeeded by: Joseph Feilden

Personal details
- Born: 29 August 1804
- Died: 17 February 1890 (aged 85) Swinithwaite Hall, Yorkshire, England
- Party: Whig (until 1859); Liberal (from 1859)
- Spouse: Mary Jane Skaife (m. 1831; died 1865)
- Occupation: Cotton manufacturer; merchant; politician

James Pilkington JP DL (29 August 1804 – 17 February 1890) was a British merchant, cotton manufacturer, and Liberal Party politician.

He served as the Member of Parliament (MP) for Blackburn from 1847–1865 and was also Deputy Lieutenant of Lancashire.

His assault during a robbery in July 1862 was widely covered in the London press and led to a second London garrotting panic that would last until the start of 1863.

== Attack and robbery ==
Pilkington was robbed by thieves in 1862 in Westminster and garrotted.

== Bibliography ==
- Sindall, R. (1987). "The London Garotting Panics of 1856 and 1862". Social History. 12 (3): 351–359. doi:10.1080/03071028708567694. ISSN 0307-1022. JSTOR 4285629.

Parliament of the United Kingdom
Preceded by William Feilden; John Hornby	Member of Parliament for Blackburn; 1847–1865; With: John Hornby to 1852; William Eccles 1852–1853; Montague Joseph Feilden 1853–1857; William Henry Hornby from 1857	Succeeded by Joseph Feilden; William Henry Hornby
