= John Duckworth (politician) =

English politician

John Duckworth

John Duckworth (1 November 1863 – 22 January 1946) was an English Liberal Party politician and cotton manufacturer.

== Family ==
Duckworth was the son of George Duckworth. In 1890 he married Ruth Sutcliffe, the daughter of a Lancashire justice of the peace.

== Politics ==
In 1923 he succeeded the sitting Liberal MP, Sir Henry Norman. According to The Times Newspaper, Duckworth was not associated with the internal feuding which had plagued the Liberals since the split between H H Asquith and David Lloyd George in December 1916 and this helped unify the two wings of the party there in the run up to the 1923 general election. Duckworth was elected member of parliament for Blackburn in 1923 and held the seat at the 1924 election. He served as MP until 1929 when he stood down from Parliament.

The Blackburn constituency was a two-member seat and the Liberals and Unionists remained in partnership there after 1918 against the socialist threat, maintaining the former wartime coalition arrangements. Each party contested one of the two seats, ensuring the anti-Labour vote was not split and so keeping Labour out. Duckworth carried on his alliance with the Tories inside Parliament. In January 1924 he was one of then Liberal MPs to defy his party line and vote with the Conservatives in an attempt to prevent the formation of the first Labour government under Ramsay MacDonald. He also voted with the Conservatives later that year in the division over the decision of the Poplar Board of Guardians to exceed the amount of relief they were entitled to dispense to the deserving poor and also on the government's naval estimates.

While in Parliament, Duckworth took an interest in agricultural affairs, with a particular reference to sugar-beet production and in foreign policy he was especially concerned with Anglo-Chinese relations

== Cotton trader ==
He was managing director of Mssrs. John Duckworth and Sons, cotton manufacturers and traders of Blackburn. In 1927, Duckworth led a deputation of representatives of the Lancashire cotton industry to meet the Home Secretary on the question of the Factories Bill.

Parliament of the United Kingdom
Preceded by Sir Sydney Henn and Sir Henry Norman	Member of Parliament for Blackburn; 1923–1929; With: Sydney Henn	Succeeded by Thomas Gill and Mary Hamilton
