= Harry Hornby =

British politician

Hornby in 1895.

Sir William Henry Hornby, 1st Baronet, DL (29 August 1841 – 22 October 1928), usually known as Harry Hornby, was an English industrialist and Conservative Party politician from Blackburn in Lancashire. He sat in the House of Commons from 1886 to 1910 but is notable for never speaking, or attempting to speak, in Parliament throughout his 24-year career there.

== Family and early life ==
Hornby was the fourth son of William Henry Hornby, who had been Mayor of Blackburn and also served as Member of Parliament for the town; his younger brother was A.N.'Monkey' Hornby, the Lancashire and England cricket captain. He had little interest himself in a political career but was proud of his family's record and noted the affection many in the local community felt for them. He was persuaded to enter politics as a member of the School Board when selected by the Church of England in 1871, and was subsequently voted chairman unanimously. In 1873 he was elected to the Town Council with a majority of one vote, prompting the Church to ring its bells. The year 1876 was 25th anniversary of Blackburn's incorporation and Hornby, as the son of the first Mayor, was persuaded to accept the office to mark the occasion. He resigned from the council in 1880 when his lack of electioneering was questioned.

== Parliament ==
At the 1886 general election, Hornby was selected as the Conservative candidate without formality and with his confession that he had not wished to stand. Nevertheless, he was elected. Hornby was acutely aware that he was no good at making speeches, and was reluctant even to speak in Blackburn even though the townsfolk understood and accepted his difficulty. He was re-elected in subsequent general elections, winning more votes than his running-mate in the two-member constituency.

In November 1896 Hornby wrote to the Conservative leader in Blackburn offering his resignation; as a result a delegation was organised to persuade him to change his mind. Some suspected that the fact that the other Blackburn MP William Coddington had recently been awarded a Baronetcy may have influenced Hornby's decision, and pressure was put on the Prime Minister to follow up. In the New Year's Honours list of 1899, Hornby was himself created a Baronet; flags were hung around the town's public buildings to mark the award. In November 1901 Hornby was also elected Mayor of Blackburn for the following year.

He was elected a Fellow of the Zoological Society of London (FZS) in July 1902.

== 1906 election ==
During the split in the Unionists over Tariff Reform, Hornby was among the minority in being a strong supporter of Free Trade although he belonged to no Free Trade organisation. At the 1906 general election, Hornby's record came under sustained criticism for the first time in his life. He responded by uncharacteristically making speeches vigorously defending himself; unfamiliar as he was, he took to offering large sums of money in challenges to rebut personal attacks on him. Against Hornby and another Conservative Free Trader stood the future Chancellor of the Exchequer Philip Snowden as a Labour candidate, and Edwin Hamer as a Liberal, running in effect a joint campaign. The election was very close but the fact that 822 voters used their two votes for Hornby and Snowden, while 624 voted for Hornby and Hamer, ensured that Hornby was again returned at the head of the poll. Snowden took the second seat.

Hornby announced in 1908 that he would not stand again because he was becoming deaf, and felt depressed by life in the House of Commons where many of his old friends had lost their seats.

Parliament of the United Kingdom
Preceded by Sir Robert Peel, Bt; William Coddington	Member of Parliament for Blackburn; 1886 – January 1910; With: William Coddington to 1906; Philip Snowden from 1906	Succeeded by Sir Thomas Barclay; Philip Snowden
Baronetage of the United Kingdom
New creation	Baronet (of Brookhouse); 1899–1928	Succeeded by Henry Russell Hornby
