= Stanley House Hotel, Mellor =

Listed building in Lancashire, England

Stanley House
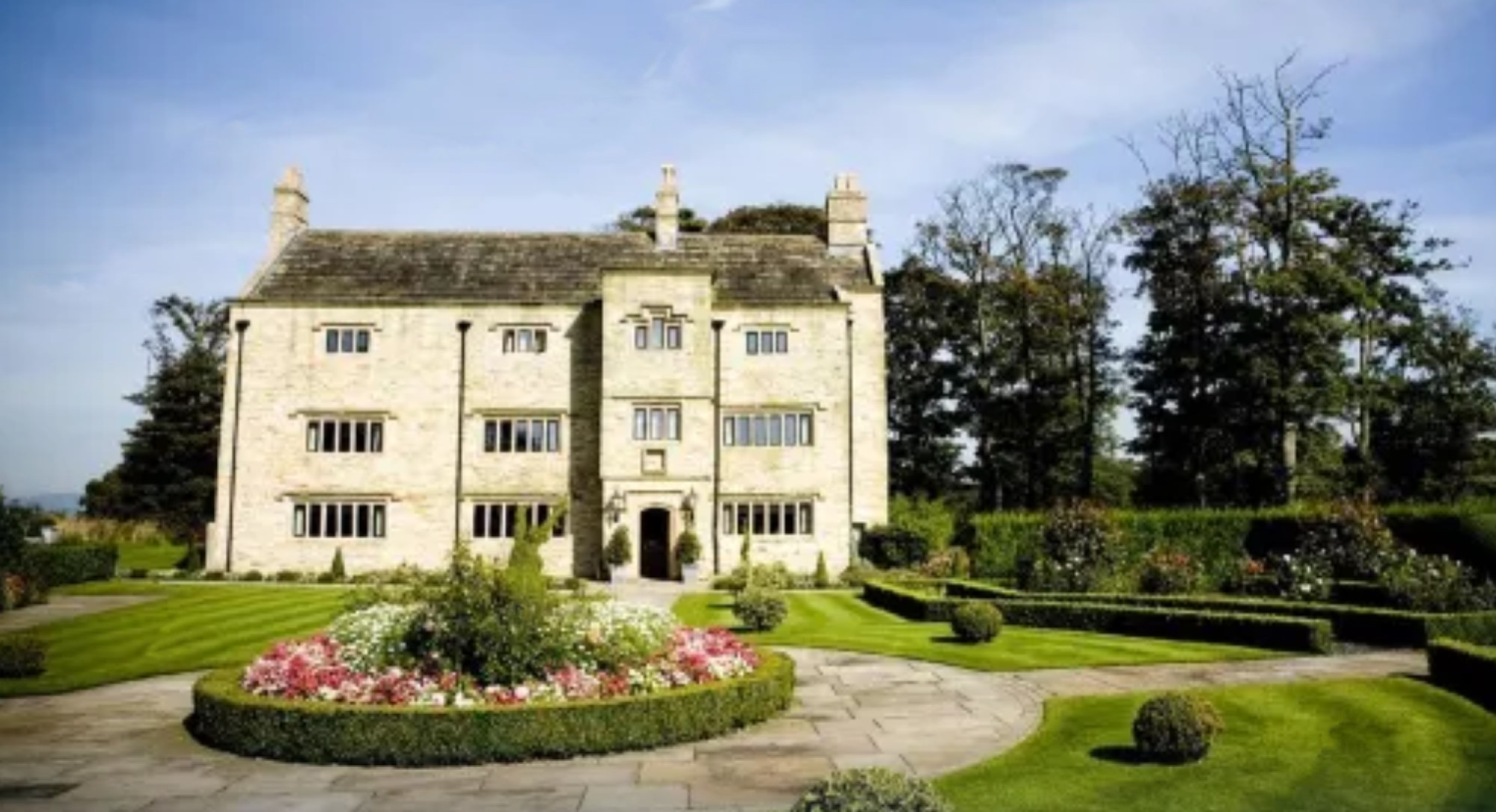
- Stanley House

- Location within the Borough of Ribble Valley

General information
- Location: Mellor, Lancashire, England
- Coordinates: 53.76447°N 2.53897°W
- Year built: Late 16th or early 17th century

Technical details
- Floor count: 3

Listed Building – Grade II*
- Official name: Stanley House
- Designated: 24 August 1952
- Reference no.: 1164519

Stanley House in Mellor, Lancashire, England, is a building of historical significance and is Grade II* listed on the English Heritage Register. It was built in the late 16th or early 17th century and was the home of notable people for many years. However, by the early 19th century, the status of the house sank to that of a rented farmhouse. Farming activity continued over the next two centuries with tenant farmers being the occupants. In 1999 the land and buildings were then purchased by Leehand Leisure Ltd, and they converted the building to a hotel and spa which opened in 2003.

== Early owners ==
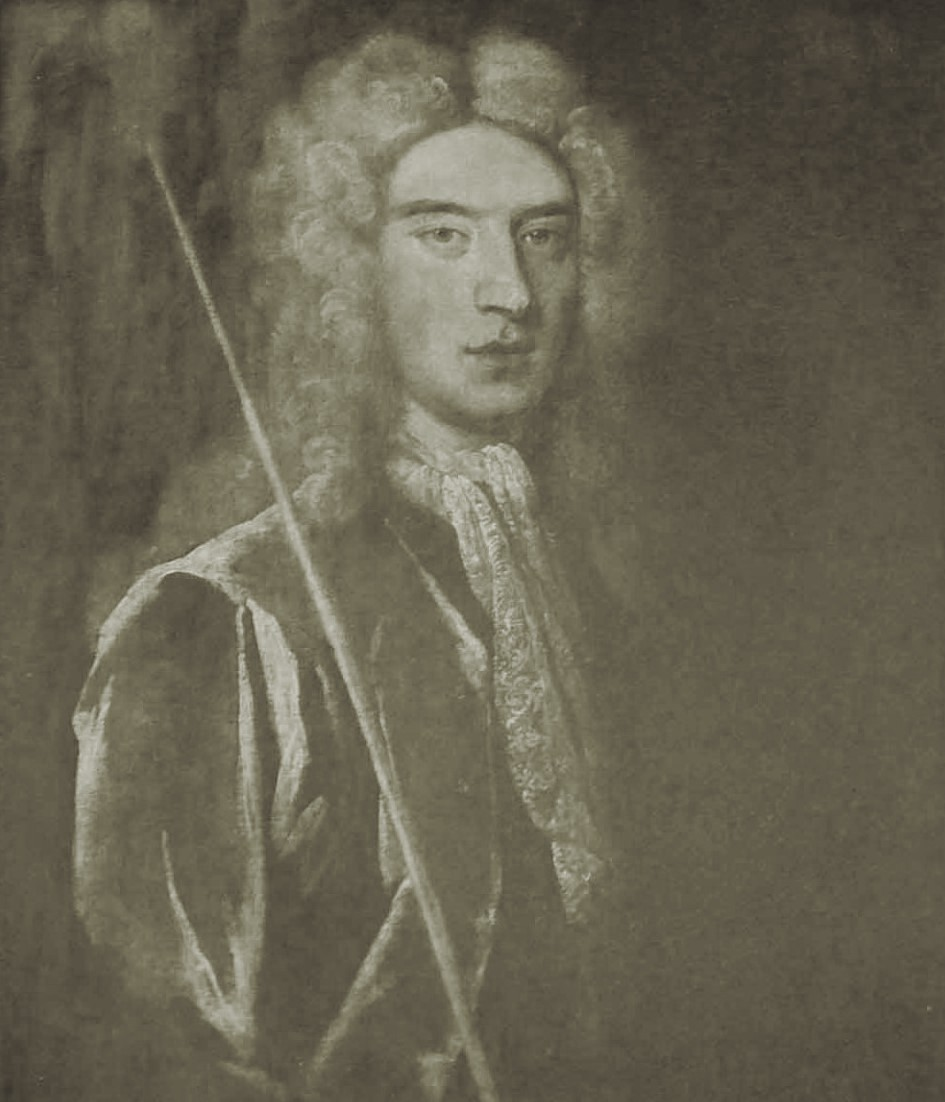
Joseph Yates (1690–1773)

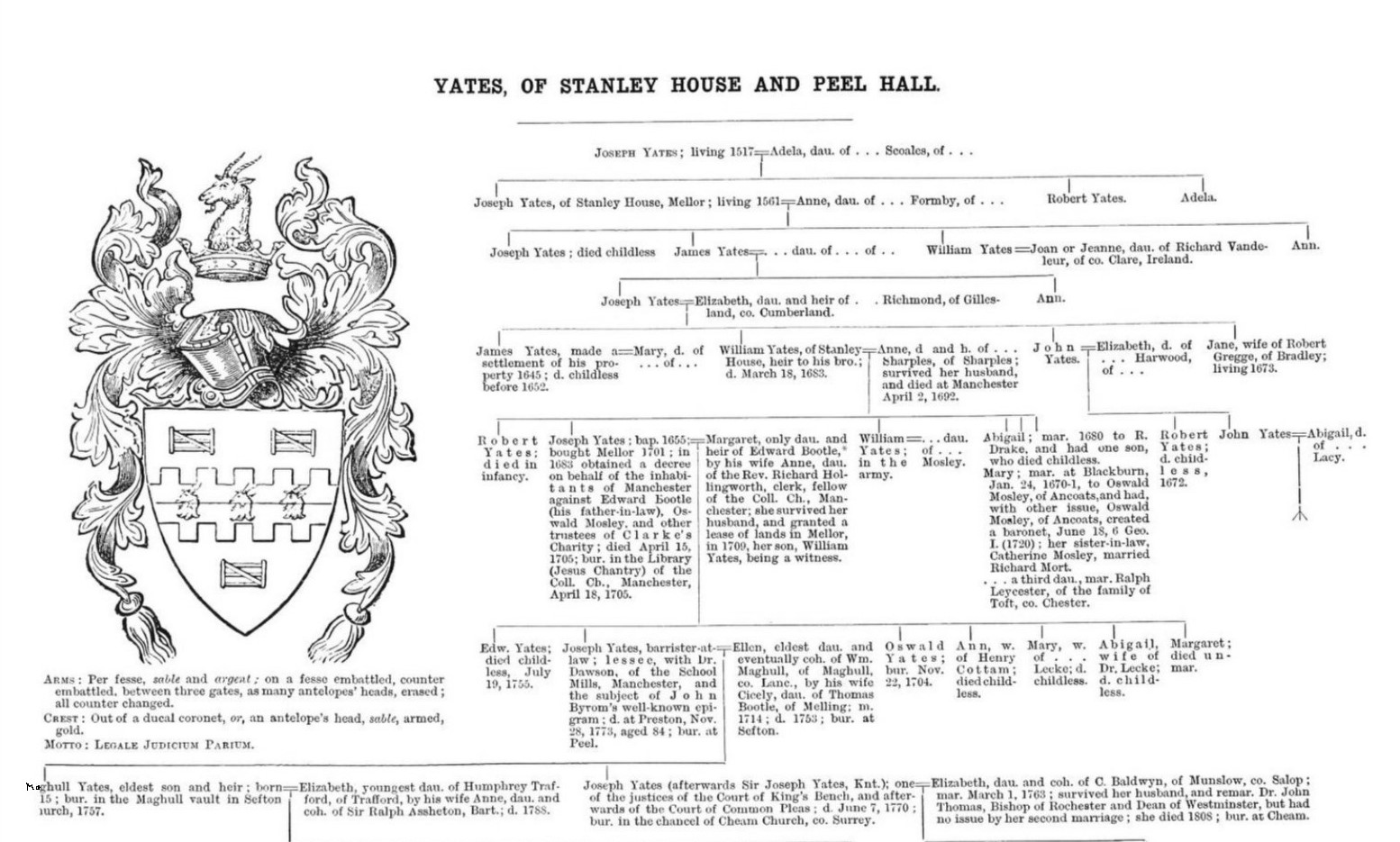
Family tree of the Yates of Stanley House

According to the historian William Farrer, Stanley House was built "in the late 16th or early 17th century". He said that it was "for a long period the reputed manor-house of Mellor. It was in the 16th century the property of a family from whom it took its name."

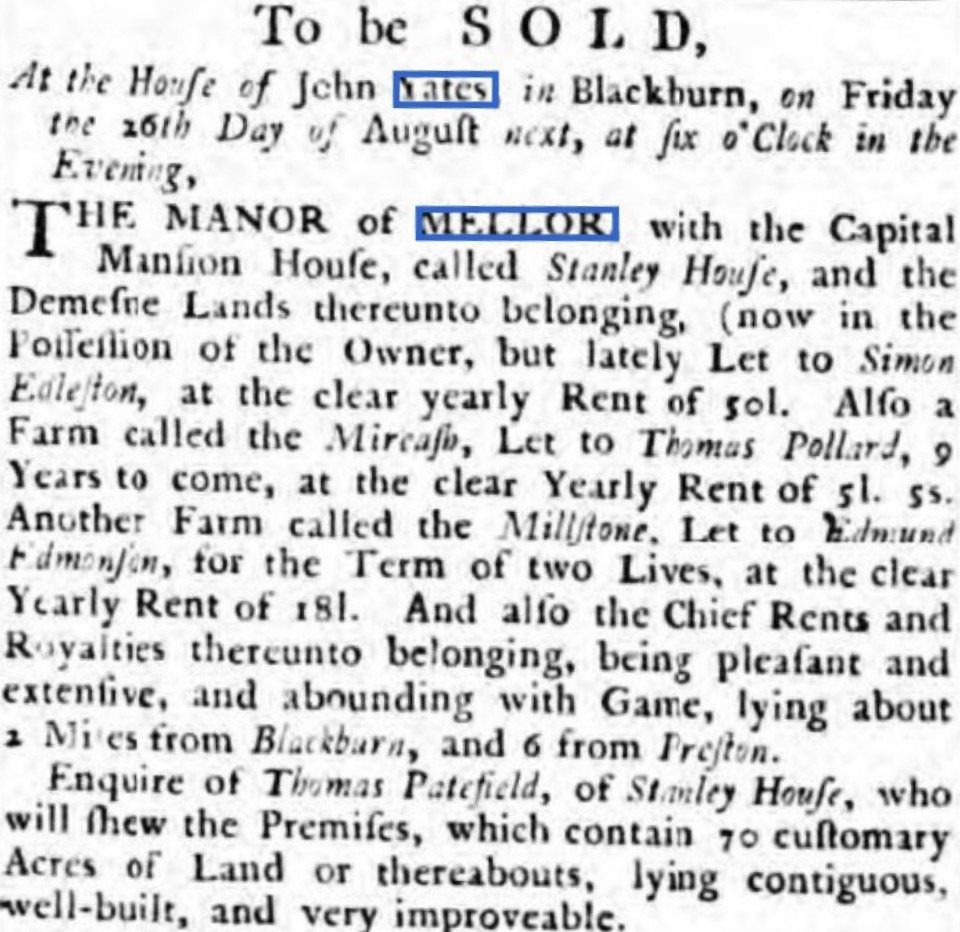
Sale notice for Stanley House in 1768

Peter Stanley appears to have been the owner in the 16th century. According to a book by the Chetham Society of Manchester "his name frequently occurs in the Duchy Calendar with respect to lands at Mellor, Bickerstaff etc" It may therefore have been he who built Stanley House. He also built Moor Hall in Aughton in 1566. Moor Hall has mullioned windows similar to Stanley House. Peter's father was Sir William Stanley of Hooton and his mother was Anne Harrington coheiress of Sir James Harrington of Wolfage. He married three times and the details are outlined in the book "Plantagenet Ancestry" shown at this reference.

By about 1640 the Yates family owned the house. William Yates (1617–1683) from Blackburn bought the property at about this time. He married Ann Sharples and the couple had four sons and three daughters. When he died in 1683 he was succeeded by his eldest surviving son William Yates. However, it was his younger son Joseph Yates who lived at Stanley House. He married in 1682 Margaret Bootle of Manchester, and the couple had seven sons and five daughters. He later moved to Manchester.

His eldest surviving son, Joseph Yates, was the next owner of the house. He was a barrister, and in 1714 he married Ellen Maghull. The couple had two sons: Maghull Yates and Joseph Yates. The latter became a judge and received a knighthood. The biography of Sir Joseph Yates is at this reference. The Yates family decided to sell the house in 1768, and the sale notice is shown.

== Later owners ==
By about 1788 the property was purchased by Henry Sudell, and in 1796 he built Woodfold Hall to the south-west of Stanley House. This hall then became the main manor house of Mello, and Stanley House became a farm and was occupied from then by tenant farmers. Sudell became bankrupt in 1827 and was forced to sell the whole estate in 1831. It was bought by John Fowden Hindle (1757–1831), who died shortly after he purchased the house. It was inherited by his eldest son, John Fowden Hindle. He had no children, so when he died in 1849 it was passed to his younger brother William Fowden Hindle. On his death in 1853 his daughter Mary Jane Hindle became the owner. She had previously married George Frederick Gregory. At about this time a travel directory of Lancashire made the observation that "Stanley House, though now the homestead of a farmer, still retains traces of its former splendour." In 1878 the sister of George Frederick Gregory, Eliza Amelia, and her husband Daniel Thwaites bought the estate. Daniel Thwaites was a wealthy brewer and politician. He was the son of the founder of the present Thwaites Brewery in Blackburn. He made major improvements to the estate including repairs to Stanley House. After he died in 1888 his only child Elma Amy Thwaites inherited the property. She married Robert Yerburgh, and the couple had two sons. Their eldest son, Robert Yerburgh, who later became 1st Baron Alvingham, inherited the house; and when he died in 1955 his son Robert Guy Eardley Yerburgh (1926–2020), 2nd Baron Alvingham, became the owner. In 1999 the house was purchased by Leehand Leisure Ltd, and restoration of the now derelict building commenced.

== See also ==
- Grade II* listed buildings in Lancashire
- Listed buildings in Mellor, Lancashire
