= Yerburgh =

Yerburgh is a surname. Notable people with the surname include:

- Elma Yerburgh (1864–1946), British business woman and philanthropist, wife of Robert Armstrong Yerburgh
- Hugh Wardell-Yerburgh (1938–1970), British rower
- Janet Wardell-Yerburgh (born 1940), British fencer
- Oswald Wardell-Yerburgh (1858–1913), originally Oswald Yerburgh, an English clergyman
- Robert Armstrong Yerburgh (1853–1916), British barrister and politician, brother of Oswald Wardell-Yerburgh
- Robert Yerburgh, 1st Baron Alvingham (1889–1955), British politician, son of Robert Armstrong Yerburgh

== See also ==
- Burgh
