= Blackburn by-election =

Blackburn by-election may refer to:

- Blackburn by-election, 1853
- Blackburn by-election, 1869
- Blackburn by-election, 1875
