= Albert Hornby =

Albert Hornby is the name of:

- A. H. Hornby (1877–1952), English cricketer, son of A. N. Hornby
- A. N. Hornby (1847–1925), English rugby and cricket captain
- A. S. Hornby (1898–1978), English grammarian, lexicographer and researcher into second language teaching
