= St Mary's Church, Mellor =

Coordinates: 53.7729°N 2.5308°W

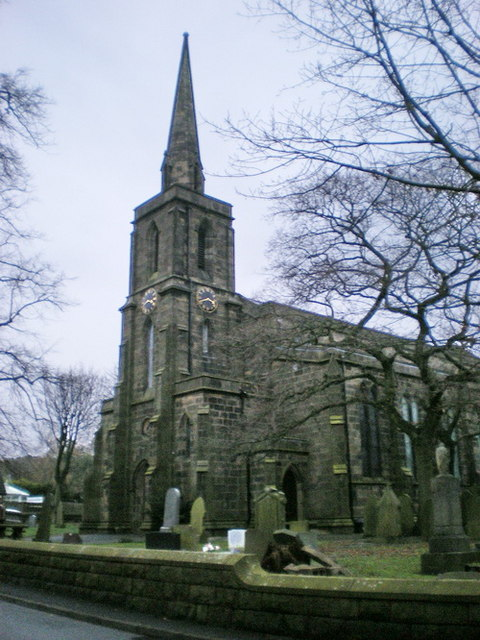
- St Mary's Church, Mellor, from the southwest

- Location in the Borough of Ribble Valley
- OS grid reference: SD 651,309
- Location: Church Lane, Mellor, Lancashire
- Country: England
- Denomination: Anglican
- Website: St Mary, Mellor

History
- Status: Parish church

Architecture
- Functional status: Active
- Heritage designation: Grade II
- Designated: 13 March 1986
- Architect(s): Thomas Rickman and Henry Hutchinson
- Architectural type: Church
- Style: Gothic Revival
- Groundbreaking: 1827
- Completed: 1829
- Construction cost: £5,496

Specifications
- Materials: Sandstone, slate roofs

Administration
- Province: York
- Diocese: Blackburn
- Archdeaconry: Blackburn
- Deanery: Whalley
- Parish: St Mary, Mellor

Clergy
- Vicar: Revd Amma Sue Williams

St Mary's Church is in Church Lane, Mellor, Lancashire, England. It is an active Anglican parish church in the deanery of Whalley, the archdeaconry of Blackburn, and the diocese of Blackburn. The church is recorded in the National Heritage List for England as a designated Grade II listed building. It was a Commissioners' church, having received a grant towards its construction from the Church Building Commission.

== History ==
The church was built between 1827 and 1829 to a design by Thomas Rickman and Henry Hutchinson. A grant of £5,534 (equivalent to £520,000 in 2025) was given towards its construction by the Church Building Commission. The cost of construction of the church was £5,496.^{[A]} It was restored and altered in 1897–99 by Austin and Paley who created a chancel by raising the east end, and building a screen and furnishings for the choir.

== Architecture ==
=== Exterior ===
St Mary's is constructed in sandstone with a slate roof. Its plan consists of a six-bay nave with a clerestory and a continuous chancel, north and south aisles, and a west tower. The tower is in three stages with angle buttresses. There is a west door above which is quatrefoil in a circular surround. There are single-light windows in the middle stage, and the bell openings in the top stage also have a single light. The tower is surmounted by a needle spire, set back from the parapet. It contains openings under gablets. In the angles between the tower and the nave are single-storey projections with buttresses and single-light west windows. The bays along the walls of the aisles are separated by buttresses, and each bay contains a pair of lancet windows. The clerestory bays also contain paired windows. In the angles between the aisles and the chancel are more single-storey projections. On each side of the chancel are single-light windows, and the east window consists of five stepped lancets.

=== Interior ===
Inside the church are five-bay arcades with pointed arches carried on piers consisting of four clustered columns. There is a west gallery with carved traceried panels that contains an organ. Between the nave and the altar is a screen that incorporates a pulpit on its northern side. The font is in white marble, and has a carved cover including a pyramidal spire with angels. The stained glass includes windows in the south aisle by Capronnier dating from the later part of the 19th century, and a window in the north aisle dated 1928 by Whitefriars. There are also two windows from the early 20th century that are possibly by Shrigley and Hunt. The three-manual organ was built by Renn and Boston, and was extended in 1897 by Edwin Smith of Blackburn.

== External features ==
The churchyard contains the war graves of ten Commonwealth service personnel of World War I, and six of World War II.

== See also ==
- List of Commissioners' churches in Northeast and Northwest England
- Listed buildings in Mellor, Lancashire
- List of ecclesiastical works by Austin and Paley (1895–1914)

== Notes ==
^{A} In some cases, as in this one, the size of the grant was greater than the actual construction cost because it also included contributions towards the cost of the site, legal fees, etc.
