= Joseph Feilden =

Joseph Feilden may refer to:

- Joseph Feilden (Blackburn MP) (1792–1870), MP for Blackburn
- Joseph Feilden (British Army officer) (1824–1895), his son, Army officer and MP for North Lancashire and Chorley
