= 1869 Blackburn by-election =

UK parliamentary by-election

The 1869 Blackburn by-election was a parliamentary by-election held in England in March 1869. It returned two members of parliament (MPs) to the UK House of Commons for the borough of Blackburn in Lancashire.

It was a rare double-by-election, caused when the 1868 general election of the borough's two Conservative MPs was nullified. Their sons won the by-election, but the result led to fighting in the town of Blackburn and was denounced by the Liberal Party candidates as a "farce".

== The vacancy ==
On 16 March 1869, the result of the 1868 general election in borough of Blackburn was declared null and void, after an election petition had been lodged. The two Conservatives who had been elected, Joseph Feilden and William Henry Hornby, were unseated when Mr Justice Willes found that there had been widespread intimidation of voters. The candidates themselves were absolved of direct involvement in the intimidation, but their agents were held responsible for a document known as the "screw circular". The circular called on mill-owners, tradesmen, and other employers to secure the election of Conservatives at both the municipal and parliamentary elections, and led to the dismissal of many long-serving employees on the spurious grounds of trivial misconduct, long after the alleged misconduct had occurred.

== Candidates ==
The nominations were made on 29 March 1869, before a gathering of 15,000 people in Blakey Moor, Blackburn.

The Liberal Party nominated John Gerald Potter, who had contested Blackburn in 1865 and 1868, and John Morley, a barrister who had taken up journalism and become the editor of the Fortnightly Review.

Potter told meeting that if the working classes of Blackburn were allowed to vote freely, he and Morley would both be returned, and that the longer he lived, the more he saw the need for voting to be conducted by secret ballot. He favoured the abolition of the ratepaying qualification for elections, a national system of education, a reduction in taxation and the legalisation of trade unions. Morley said that the Tories had no policy, no spirit and no temper, and that he supported the policies of the present government.

The Conservatives also nominated two candidates: Edward Hornby and Henry Master Feilden, both sons of the ousted Conservatives MPs. Both Hornby and Fielden appealed for support as a tribute to their fathers, with Hornby asserting that he had "no vain idea" that his own merits were enough to qualify him as an MP.

== Result ==
There was no secret ballot until 1872, so voting was conducted in public at the hustings, which were attended by a large number of police armed with cutlasses. A show of hands was taken and pronounced to be in favour of Fielden and Hornby, but a vote was demanded on behalf of the Liberal candidates.

Polling took place the following day, 30 March, in 25 locations. Voting began at 8am, and there were no reports of any disturbances. The Times newspaper reported that "only three persons" were arrested for personation, one of whom had been released when it was acknowledged that a mistake had been made.

The results were announced by the Mayor at 6.30pm, when Fielden and Hornby were declared the winners with a margin of over 700 votes.

In their acceptance speeches, Fielden and Hornby both pronounced the result as being the true voice of Blackburn once the screw had been removed. Fielden said that he hoped that Potter would not dare challenge the result again, and then a fight broke out, which was speedily broken up the police. There were reports that shots had been fired, but The Times reported that the police had received no accounts of anyone wounded by gunfire.

The Liberal candidates did not appear on the platform at the declaration, and issued a printed statement saying that they were unsurprised by the result. They asserted that the Conservative victory was the result of intimidation, and elections in Blackburn would remain "a farce" without a secret ballot.

At about 7pm, stones were thrown at Conservative supporters in Penny Street. A policeman was shot in the arm, other shots were fired from windows, and there was serious fighting for a few minutes until 60 policemen came to guard the approaches to the street.

== Aftermath ==
Edward Hornby never stood for Parliament again, and held the seat until the 1874 general election, when he retired from the House of Commons. Henry Master Feilden was re-elected in 1874, but died in office in 1875, triggering a by-election in October 1875.

After three unsuccessful candidacies, J. G. Potter did not stand again. John Morley unsuccessfully contested the City of Westminster at the 1880 general election, and was elected as MP for Newcastle-upon-Tyne at a by-election in February 1883. He held a number of senior posts in the Cabinet, and was ennobled in 1908 as Viscount Morley of Blackburn.

By-election, 31 March 1869: Blackburn
Party	Candidate	Votes	%	±%
Conservative	Edward Hornby	4,738	27.5	+0.7
Conservative	Henry Master Feilden	4,697	27.3	+0.9
Liberal	J. G. Potter	3,964	23.0	−1.0
Liberal	John Morley	3,804	22.1	−0.7
Majority		733	4.3	+1.9
Turnout		17,203		
Conservative hold		Swing	+0.9	
Conservative hold		Swing	+0.8	

== Previous election ==
General election, 1868: Blackburn
Party	Candidate	Votes	%	±%
Conservative	William Henry Hornby	4,907	26.8	−5.0
Conservative	Joseph Feilden	4,826	26.4	−1.9
Liberal	J. G. Potter	4,399	24.0	+6.6
Liberal	Montague Joseph Feilden	4,164	22.8	+0.3
Majority		427	2.4	−3.4
Turnout		18,296		
Conservative hold		Swing	-5.8	
Conservative hold		Swing	-1.1	

== See also ==
- 1853 Blackburn by-election
- 1875 Blackburn by-election
