= International cricket in 1882 =

International cricket season

The 1882 international cricket season was from April 1882 to September 1882. The season consisted of a single international tour, Australia visiting England for a one-off series which was won by Australia. The match is not considered to be part of The Ashes since it preceded the introduction of the trophy.

== Season overview ==
International tours
Start date	Home team	Away team	Results [Matches]	
Start date	Home team	Away team	Test	FC
10 July 1882	England	Australia	0–1 [1]	—

== July ==
=== Australia in England ===
One-off Test match
No.	Date	Home captain	Away captain	Venue	Result
Test 9	28–29 August	Monkey Hornby	Billy Murdoch	Kennington Oval, London	Australia by 7 runs
