= Thwaites Brewery =

Regional brewery in England

Daniel Thwaites plc
- Type: PLC
- Industry: Hospitality
- Founded: 1807; 219 years ago in Blackburn, Lancashire, England
- Founder: Daniel Thwaites
- Headquarters: Blackburn, Lancashire, England
- Key people: Anne Yerburgh (chairman)
- Products: Food and beverage
- Revenue: £162.7m (2007)
- Website: thwaites.co.uk

Thwaites Brewery is a regional brewery established in 1807 in Blackburn, Lancashire, England, by founder Daniel Thwaites. Now located near Mellor in the Ribble Valley, part of the company was sold to Marston's in 2015, and the original brewery was demolished in 2019.

Thwaites produces beer on a small scale. The brewery invested in nitrokeg beers in the 1990s, but is working to increase market demand for its cask beers. Thwaites unveiled their new craft brewery in 2011.

In 1999, the Mitchell Brewery in Lancaster closed down and was bought in part by Thwaites. Lancaster Bomber, an ale named after the Avro Lancaster aircraft, has been available at Thwaites' public houses since the Marston acquisition and is now brewed by Marston's, as is Wainwright, another Thwaites beer.

The company has over 270 pubs, mainly in the North of England.

== History ==
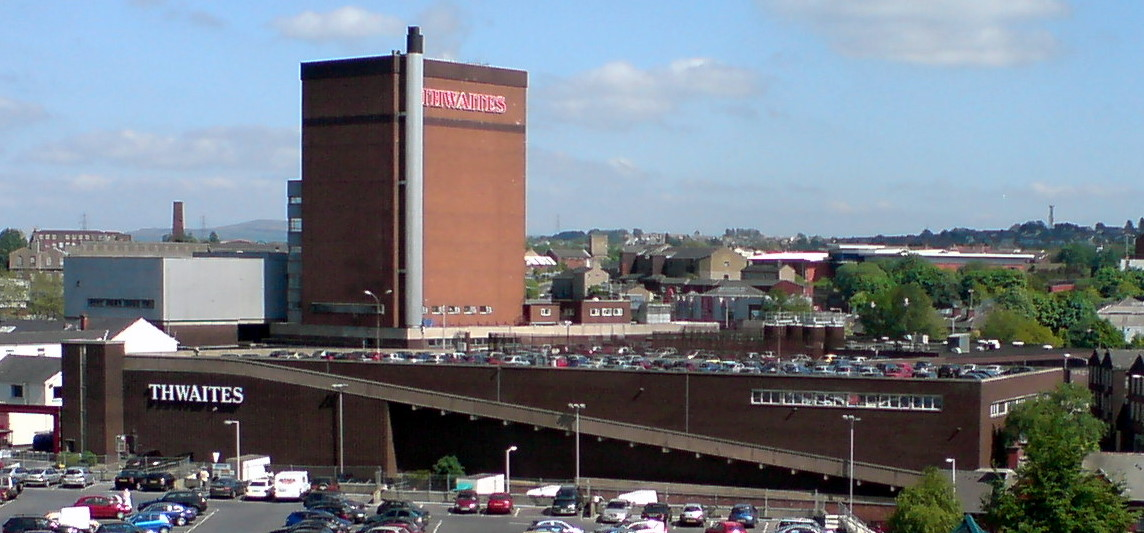
Thwaites Brewery in Blackburn town centre

=== Establishment ===
In 1807, Daniel Thwaites (born 1777) began brewing in Blackburn, Lancashire, after the founding of Eanam Brewery in partnership with local businessmen Edward Duckworth and William Clayton. At the age of 31, Daniel married Edward's daughter Betty, who inherited her father's share of the company following his death in 1822.

The brewery became the sole property of the Thwaites' in 1824 when William Clayton sold his remaining share of the company to Daniel Thwaites.

Daniel and Betty Thwaites went on to have twelve children - four sons and eight daughters. Daniel Thwaites Jr was born in 1817, the sixth of their twelve children. Daniel Thwaites Jr and his brothers John and Thomas later inherited the brewery following the death of their father, Daniel Thwaites Sr, in 1843.

The 1850s saw the growth of the brewery and business expansion for the Thwaites partners. Thomas left the partnership and, following the earlier death of his mother and the retirement of his other brother, John, Daniel Thwaites Jr became the sole owner of the brewery in 1858. One year later, he married Eliza Amelia Gregory, and they had a son, Edward, who died in infancy, and a daughter, Elma Amy Thwaites.

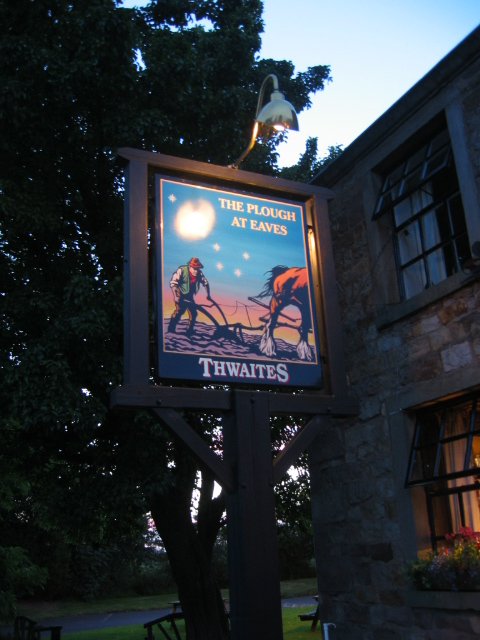
The Plough at Eaves, a Thwaites pub

The official announcement of the partnership dissolution published in the London Gazette on 25 February 1859 stated that it was by mutual consent.

Following the purchase of the Snig Brook Brewery in 1863, the brewery carried on and increased in its size. During this period of expansion, Eanam Brewery heightened production to provide 100,000 barrels a year by 1878.

Additionally, the business adapted to various legislation introduced by Gladstone's Liberal government. The 1869 Wine and Beer House Act gave licensing power back to the magistrates and was intended to control the more unsavoury beer shops. It was followed by the Intoxicating Liquor Licensing Act of 1872, which introduced higher license fees, licensing inspectors, reduced opening hours, restrictions on selling spirits to those 'apparently under the age of 16', and increased penalties for licensing offences.

Daniel Thwaites Jr died in 1888, leaving his only daughter, Elma Thwaites, to inherit the Brewery, along with her husband, Robert Yerburgh. Despite all expectations from society at the time, she decided not to sell the business, but to continue to run it, growing the Brewery.

=== Expansion into the 20th century ===
By 1897, to keep up with increased competition in the industry and to raise capital in order to support future growth, Thwaites registered itself as a limited company, Daniel Thwaites & Co Ltd. Following this business expansion, Thwaites bought James Pickup Wines & Spirits Company and then Henry Shaw & Co, which owned the New Brewery in Salford. In 1925, Thwaites began bottling its beers and, in 1927, purchased Fountain Free Brewery.

1946, Elma Yerburgh died, leaving her colleague Albert Whittle in charge of looking after the brewery, which continued to expand, purchasing the Bury Brewing Company in 1946 and the Preston Brewery Company in 1956. In 1966, the Eanam Brewery was extended and renamed the Star Brewery (not to be confused with the Star Brewery in Romford, East London).

By the 1960s, there were many Thwaites public houses in Blackburn, and Daniel Thwaites ales had significantly increased sales throughout East Lancashire. 1966 saw the opening of the new £5.5m Brewery and brewhouse, followed in 1972 by a new £3m bottling plant.

The 1970s and 1980s saw the purchase of Yates & Jackson of Lancaster. Throughout this time, John Yerburgh, Elma Yerburgh's grandson, was the Brewery's chairman.

In 2002, John's wife, Ann, became the Brewery's chairman. John died in June 2014, aged 91.

In 2017, Thwaites was granted planning permission to build a new brewery, stables, and head office in Mellor, around 5 miles from its current location in Blackburn.

=== Shire horses ===
The sound continuously heard in Blackburn throughout the 19th century was the clattering of horses' hooves along the cobbled streets. The majority of these were workhorses. Stable lads would lead the Thwaites horses out of the stables in Syke Street, across the road (until the end of the 19th century when the stables moved to the Brewery site), and into the Brewery yard where they would wait for their carts and drays to be loaded with the day's deliveries. These large shire horses were a common sight in Blackburn for many years. In the 1920s, however, most breweries decided to put their shire horses 'out to grass' and switch to motor transport. In 1927, the last of the Thwaites shire horses left the Brewery.

By the 1950s, the shire horse had practically ceased to exist. However, in 1957 an enterprising young manager called David Kay of Thwaites' soft drinks department wanted to bring the Shire dray horses back. Two years later, in 1959, he got his wish and was allowed to introduce two dray horses to the Brewery's local route. He believed the dray horses could attract publicity and potentially reduce costs. On May Day in 1960, the first two shire horses were led out of the new Thwaites stables.

In 2016, Thwaites acquired a third horse named Gunner to celebrate 13 Guns, a beer produced by the company.

=== Recent history ===
2010 marked fifty years of the reintroduction of horse-drawn deliveries after they ended in the 1920s. To celebrate the anniversary, a commemorative sculpture featuring three of the Shire horses in a unicorn configuration was commissioned.

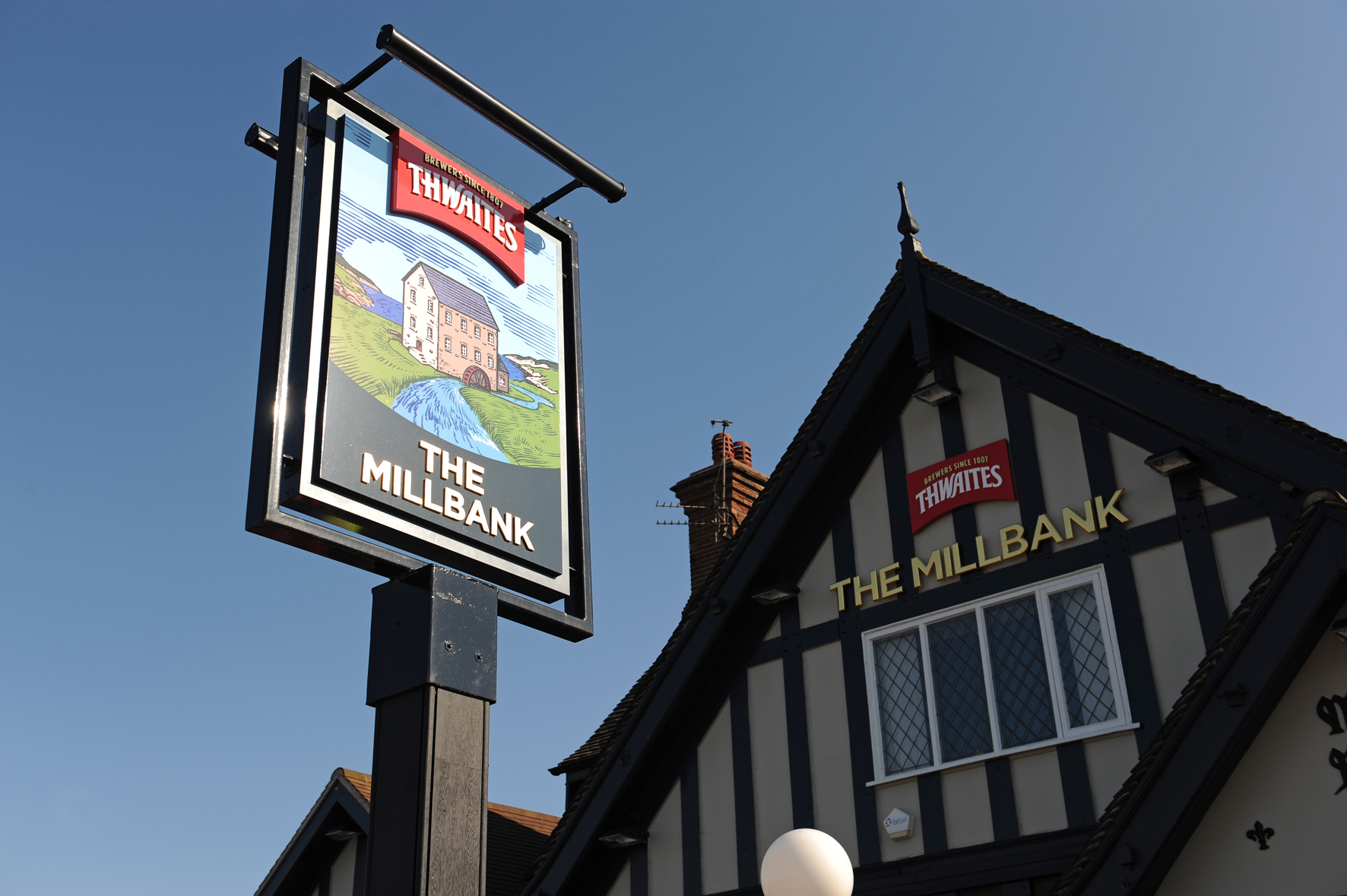
Picture of a present-day Thwaites pub, with the new Thwaites logo

Thwaites started with ten public houses in 1807. Based at the Star Brewery in Blackburn, Thwaites now owns an estate of around 270 pubs, and a portfolio of inns and hotels, and spas, which traded under the Shire Hotels banner until 2016 when they were brought under the Daniel Thwaites name.

The company remains under the leadership of descendants of the founding family. Richard Bailey is chairman and chief executive officer, and members of the Yerburgh Family are Non-Exec Directors.

In 2011, Thwaites announced plans to build a new Brewery.

At the end of 2011, Thwaites installed a new 200k craft Brewery within the Star Brewery in Blackburn named 'Crafty Dan'. Featuring three new fermenters, Crafty Dan enables Thwaites to create up to three new beers a week as well as one-off brews to mark special events. In 2016, as part of a drive to bring all parts of the business under a single brand, investment was undertaken to expand the small craft brewery under the Thwaites banner.

In January 2012, Thwaites agreed to purchase the free trade interests of Hydes Brewery.

Thwaites proposed the closure of its Star Brewery in 2014, with 60 brewing redundancies. In protest, staff altered the Brewery signage to obscure letters, resulting in an unintended derogatory word. Thwaites' inability to select an alternative site for its Brewery and to conclude a deal to sell its site to Sainsbury's received criticism from the local press and brewing industry. The Tandleman blog suggested that apart from the beers produced in the Crafty Dan craft Brewery, which had received attention for its small-batch production. Thwaites would contract out production of its beers permanently to other breweries.

This prediction was later reflected in subsequent developments; the core beers were contracted out to Marston's and the latter company bought the top two (Wainwright's and Lancaster Bomber) and the bulk of Thwaites' beer business in March 2015 for £25.1m. Marston's will continue to supply Thwaites pubs with beer under a long-term contract whilst Thwaites will continue to produce although much reduced volumes for its pubs by retaining its microbrewery facility.

== Cask ales ==
Thwaites produces a wide range of cask ales including the core range and the limited-edition Signature Ale range which was launched in 2011. 2012 saw the introduction of the Quarterly Favourites range featuring the four most popular beers from the 2011 Signature Ale range.

In March 2015, Marston's bought all rights to Wainwright and Lancaster Bomber and a short-term license to use the Thwaite brand. Owned by Marston's. Formerly sold under the Thwaites brand by Marston's but Thwaites branding was discontinued in 2016.

== Logo ==
The traditional brewery logo.

Modern logo used until 2011.

The Thwaites logo has undergone several changes since the Brewery's foundation. The traditional logo was simplified to a gold and red emblem featuring shire horses on the top and remained in use until May 2011.

The newly adopted logo is based on vintage designs from the 19th century, but for the first time in the Brewery's history, the famous shire horses which have been part of the emblem for almost 200 years have been dropped from its design.
