= William Henry Hornby (1805–1884) =

English cotton spinner, industrialist and politician

William Henry Hornby

William Henry Hornby (1805 – 4 September 1884) was an English cotton spinner, industrialist and politician. He became the first Mayor of Blackburn in Lancashire and national chairman of the Conservative Party.

== Life ==
He was the son of the cotton spinner John Hornby (1763–1841) and his wife Alice Kendall Backhouse, daughter of Daniel Backhouse, born in Blackburn.

During the 1820s the Hornby family business, a partnership with John Birley, expanded with the construction of a cotton spinning mill out of the centre of Blackburn, in the Brookhouse area on the River Blakewater. The original water mill was phased out, with power looms introduced in 1830, and a steam engine in 1841. The partnership with Birley ended in 1830, and William Henry Hornby brought in new partners.

The business grew and prospered. Hornby was a paternalist, an Anglican Tory who supported the Ten Hours Bill. His younger brother John Hornby was elected to parliament for Blackburn in 1841. Elections in Blackburn at that period involved some violence and intimidation. William himself represented Blackburn from 1857 to 1865, having been the first mayor in 1852 and failing to be elected in an 1853 by-election. In 1868 he had the most votes, but an inquiry into intimidation meant he was denied the seat. His son Edward Hornby took the seat in the further election held in 1869.

Hornby died at Poole Hall in Poole, Cheshire, on 5 September 1884.

== Family ==
Hornby married on 19 May 1831 Margaret Susannah Birley, daughter and sole heir of Edward Birley of Kirkham. They had seven sons and four daughters.

Of the sons, Edward Hornby and Harry, were also MPs for Blackburn from 1869 to 1874, and from 1886 to 1910 respectively. Another son, Albert, was the England cricket captain who lost the Test match which gave rise to the Ashes, at home against the Australians in 1882. Edward and another son Cecil also played first class cricket.

== See also ==
- Hornby Baronets

Parliament of the United Kingdom
| Preceded by James Pilkington and Montague Joseph Feilden | Member of Parliament for Blackburn; 1857–1869; With: James Pilkington to 1865; Joseph Feilden, 1865–1869 | Succeeded by Henry Feilden; Edward Hornby (son) |
