= Billinge Scar =

- Location within Blackburn

General information
- Status: Demolished
- Type: Country house
- Coordinates: 53.7566°N 2.5191°W
- Completed: 1876
- Demolished: 1947

Technical details
- Floor count: 2

Billinge Scar was a 19th-century country house (now demolished) near Blackburn, Lancashire, England.

It was built of stone in two storeys around an existing structure, with an Elizabethan facade complete with battlements. It had twelve bedrooms, a coachman's quarters and yard, several reception rooms, a library and a school room.

== History ==
Billinge was built in 1876 for Daniel Thwaites who was an MP for Blackburn from 1875 to 1880. On his death and his daughter Elma's marriage in 1888 to MP Robert Yerburgh, the couple took over the house and added a conservatory with an Italian marble floor. They later sold Billinge to cotton manufacturer William Birtwistle and moved to Woodfold Hall. In 1921 the hall passed to William Birtwistle's son Brigadier-General Arthur Birtwistle, who built what was said to be the largest private greenhouse in Lancashire, and on whose death in 1937 the property was unsuccessfully put up for sale. It was given over to public use as a training centre for telephonists during the Second World War and then demolished for building material in 1947.
