= William Edward Briggs =

English cotton manufacturer and politician

Briggs in 1880

William Edward Briggs (24 September 1847 – 1903) was an English cotton manufacturer and a Liberal politician who sat in the House of Commons from 1874 to 1885.

Briggs was the second son of Edward Briggs of The Grange, Wilpshire, Blackburn and his wife Ann Slagg, daughter of Thomas Slagg of Manchester. He was educated at Rugby School and at Worcester College, Oxford. He was a cotton-spinner and manufacturer in the firm of J and W E Briggs, which operated the Rose Hill Mill in Blackburn

At the 1874 general election, Briggs was elected as a Member of Parliament (MP) for Blackburn. He was re-elected in 1880, and held the seat until his defeat at the 1885 general election.

He did not stand in 1886, and at the 1892 general election he unsuccessfully contested the Clitheroe division of Lancashire as a Unionist, though it is unclear whether his candidacy was sponsored by the Liberal Unionist Party or the Conservative Party.

Briggs married Mary Vicars in 1871. The marriage of William Edward Briggs to Mary Ann Susannah Vicars was actually registered in Westminster in 1876. Third Quarter reference 1A page 904 on BMD records.

Parliament of the United Kingdom
Preceded by Henry Feilden; Edward Hornby	Member of Parliament for Blackburn; 1874–1885; With: Henry Feilden 1874–1875; Daniel Thwaites 1875–1880; Sir William Coddington 1880–1885	Succeeded by Sir William Coddington; Sir Robert Peel
