= Baron Alvingham =

British peer

Barony Alvingham
- Escutcheon: Per pale argent and azure, on a chevron between three chaplets of roses counterchanged. Crest: A falcon belled Or preying on a mallard Proper. Supporters: On either side a falcon wings expanded belled Or gorged with a chaplet of roses Azure. Motto: Who Dares Wins. Badge: A rose Gules barbed seeded leaved and slipped between two branches of laurel in saltire Proper enfiled with a baron's coronet Or.
- Creation date: 10 July 1929
- Created by: King George V
- Peerage: Peerage of the United Kingdom
- First holder: Robert Yerburgh, 1st Baron Alvingham
- Present holder: Robert Yerburgh, 3rd Baron Alvingham
- Heir apparent: Robert Yerburgh
- Remainder to: 1st Baron's heirs male of the body lawfully begotten
- Motto: "Who Dares Wins"

Baron Alvingham, of Woodfold in the County Palatine of Lancaster, is a title in the Peerage of the United Kingdom. It was created on 10 July 1929 for Robert Yerburgh. He had previously represented Dorset South in the House of Commons as a Conservative. His father, Robert Yerburgh, had earlier represented Chester in Parliament. In 1916, Royal approval was given to a peerage to whom he had been signified, but he died before the patent was issued. The first Baron's son, the second Baron, who succeeded his father in 1955, served in the Coldstream Guards and retired in 1981 as a Major-General and Director of Army Quartering. As of 2020 the title is held by his son, the third Baron, who succeeded his father in that year.

The family seat is Bix Hall, near Henley-on-Thames, Oxfordshire.

== Barons Alvingham (1929) ==
- Robert Daniel Thwaites Yerburgh, 1st Baron Alvingham (1889–1955)
- Robert Guy Eardley Yerburgh, 2nd Baron Alvingham (1926–2020)
- Robert Richard Guy Yerburgh, 3rd Baron Alvingham (b. 1956)

The heir apparent is the present holder's son Robert William Guy Yerburgh (b. 1983).
The heir apparent's heir apparent is his son Robert Rafe Guy Yerburgh (b. 2015).
