= Mellor Brook =

Village in Lancashire, England

Coordinates: 53.775°N 2.547°W

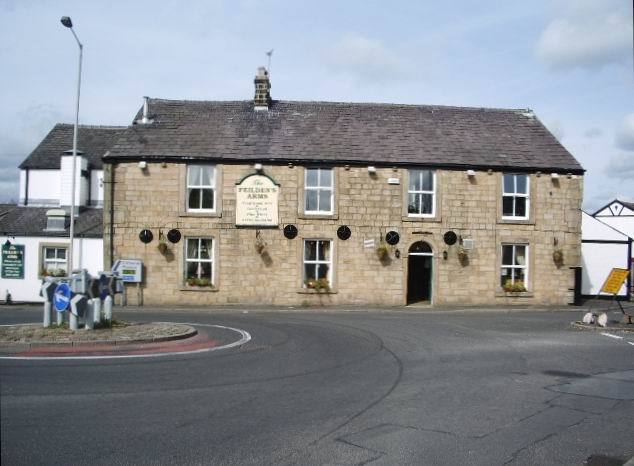
- The Feilden's Arms public house, Mellor Brook

- Shown within South Ribble Shown within Ribble Valley Location within Lancashire
- OS grid reference: SD640311
- Civil parish: Mellor
- District: South Ribble; Ribble Valley
- Shire county: Lancashire
- Region: North West
- Country: England
- Sovereign state: United Kingdom
- Post town: BLACKBURN
- Postcode district: BB2
- Dialling code: 01254
- Police: Lancashire
- Fire: Lancashire
- Ambulance: North West
- UK Parliament: South Ribble; Ribble Valley

Mellor Brook is a village which straddles the borders of the Boroughs of Ribble Valley and South Ribble in Lancashire, England. The village population at the 2011 census was 2,467.

The village of Mellor Brook is approximately 4 miles (6 km) north west of Blackburn. The geographical area of Mellor Brook is quite small, covering an area of approximately 4 square miles (10 km^{2}).

There is a bakery located in the heart of Mellor Brook. The bakery is well known and successful and started in the village, eventually moving its main operation to nearby Ramsgreave, but still retaining its original village shop. The shop's pies are a favourite of the English fashion designer, Wayne Hemingway. In recent years, both the village's newsagent and post office have closed.

In 1808/9, the road (A59) from Mellor Brook to Clitheroe was opened as a toll road hence the position of the toll house at the top of Higher Commons Lane. Preston New Road (A677) between Blackburn and Preston, followed in 1824 and hence Branch Road, getting its name because it joined the two turnpike roads, opened at the same time.

The village also has a thriving community centre; it is thought the building came into existence in June 1823, when a plot of land was assigned to a group of gentlemen on which they could build an independent place of worship. The building was purchased by the Church of England in 1833 and it was proposed that it be used during the week as a schoolhouse.

The premises became known as St Saviours Chapel, Mellor Brook. The building was used as a primary school right until 1962, after which time the Church allowed it to be sold to the parish councils of the area. In 1966, Mellor Brook Community Centre came into existence, and has been such ever since.

The village is adjacent to the former Samlesbury Aerodrome, now owned by BAE Systems. BAE developed commercial units on the site close the village.
