= Edward Hornby =

English Conservative politician

Edward Kenworthy Hornby (16 June 1839, in Blackburn – 25 June 1887) was an English Conservative Party politician. He sat in the House of Commons from 1869 to 1874.

== Family ==
Hornby was the second son of the industrialist and politician William Henry Hornby and his wife Susannah née Birley. His brothers Albert and Cecil were both cricketers, and his brother William was a politician.

He was educated at Harrow and became a Justice of the Peace (JP) for Lancashire.

== Career ==
On 16 March 1869, the result of the 1868 general election in the borough of Blackburn was declared null and void, after an election petition had been lodged. The two Conservatives who had been elected, Joseph Feilden and Edward Hornby's father William Henry Hornby, were unseated when Mr Justice Willes found that there had been widespread intimidation of voters. Edward Hornby was elected at the resulting by-election on 31 March 1869, along with Joseph Feilden's son Henry Master Feilden.

Both candidates had appealed for support as a tribute to their fathers, and Hornby had asserted that he had "no vain idea" that his own merits were enough to qualify him as an MP.

He held the seat until 1874, and did not contest the 1874 general election.

== Cricket ==
Hornby was a brother of England cricket team captain A. N. Hornby and he played in one match himself in 1862. He also played in Gentlemen of the North teams and at county level for Cheshire while playing at club level for Nantwich, and made a singe appearance for Shropshire, taking 8 wickets, in 1867.

== Death ==
Hornby died at Nantwich, Cheshire, in June 1887 aged 48.

Parliament of the United Kingdom
Preceded by William Henry Hornby; Joseph Feilden	Member of Parliament for Blackburn; 1869 – 1874; With: Henry Master Feilden	Succeeded by William Edward Briggs; Henry Feilden
