= Listed buildings in Mellor, Lancashire =

Mellor is a civil parish in Ribble Valley, Lancashire, England. It contains ten listed buildings that are recorded in the National Heritage List for England. Of these, one is at Grade II*, the middle grade, and the others are at Grade II, the lowest grade. The parish contains the village of Mellor, and is otherwise rural. The only listed building in the village is the church. The other listed buildings are houses and associated structures, farmhouses, and a bridge.

== Key ==
Grade	Criteria
II*	Particularly important buildings of more than special interest
II	Buildings of national importance and special interest

== Buildings ==
Name and location	Photograph	Date	Notes	Grade
Lower Reaps Farmhouse; 53.76713°N 2.51554°W	—	c. 1600	A stone house that has been raised in height and extended, consisting of a main range and a cross wing. The windows in the cross wing are mullioned, and in the main range they are mixed, some being sashes, and other modern.	II
Stanley House; 53.76448°N 2.53898°W		c. 1550	A sandstone house, partly pebbledashed, with a stone-slate roof, in three storeys. On the front is a three-storey porch, with two bays to the left and one to the right. The windows are mullioned, and all have hood moulds. The doorway in the porch has moulded jambs. There are later extension at the rear. Inside the house are fireplaces with bressumers.	II*
Shackerley; 53.76315°N 2.51970°W	—	17th century	A stone house with a roof partly of stone-slate and partly of asbestos sheet. It has two storeys, and some of the windows are mullioned. On the front is a single-story gabled porch, and a doorway with a rendered surround.	II
Hacking House Farmhouse; 53.76315°N 2.52618°W		1697	The farmhouse is in pebbledashed stone with a slate roof, and has two storeys and three bays. The windows are mullioned, and the central doorway has a moulded surround and a Tudor arched lintel painted with the date.	II
Woodfold Hall; 53.75860°N 2.55302°W	—	1798	A country house attributed to James Wyatt, abandoned after the Second World War, and later converted into apartments. It is in sandstone and has two storeys. The main front has nine bays, there are five bays on the sides, and at the rear are two wings enclosing a courtyard. On the main front is a three-bay portico with four unfluted Composite columns. The windows are sashes.	II
Mellor Lodge and gates 53.76394°N 2.53325°W	—	1790s (probable)	A pair of lodges to Woodfold Hall designed by James Wyatt in sandstone with slate roofs. They are similar, each lodge having a square plan, one storey, and one bay. On two sides are sash windows with architraves and triangular pediments. The doorways also have an architrave and a pediment. Between the lodges are iron railings and gates.	II
Middle Lodge and gates 53.76150°N 2.54178°W	—	1790s (probable)	A pair of lodges to Woodfold Hall designed by James Wyatt in sandstone with slate roofs. They are similar, each lodge having a square plan, one storey, and one bay. On the east sides are blind windows with architraves and triangular pediments. The doorways also have an architrave and a pediment. Between the lodges are iron railings and gates.	II
Bridge; 53.75694°N 2.55039°W	—	c. 1800	The bridge carries the drive to Woodfold Hall over Arley Brook. It is in stone, and consists of a single semicircular arch. The bridge has rusticated voussoirs, pilasters, a moulded cornice, and balustraded parapets with panelled piers and moulded coping.	II
St Mary's Church; 53.77291°N 2.53086°W		1827–29	Designed by Thomas Rickman and Henry Hutchinson, the church was extended in 1897–99 by Austin and Paley. It is in sandstone with a slate roof, and consists of a nave with a clerestory, aisles, a chancel, and a west steeple. The steeple has a three-stage tower with angle buttresses, a west doorway, and a recessed spire. The aisle windows are paired lancets, and the east window consists of five stepped lancets. Inside the church is a west gallery.	II
Orangery, Woodfold Hall; 53.75953°N 2.55194°W		Early to mid-19th century	The former orangery has been converted for domestic use. It is in brick faced with sandstone, and has an iron-framed glass roof. There are seven bays on the front and four on the sides, the central three bays on the front projecting as a bow window. The bays are separated by engaged columns on the front and by pilasters on the sides.	II
