= Henry Feilden (Conservative politician) =

British politician

Henry Master Feilden (21 February 1818 – 5 September 1875) was an English Conservative Party politician.

== Career ==
On 16 March 1869, the result of the 1868 general election in the borough of Blackburn was declared null and void, after an election petition had been lodged. The two Conservatives who had been elected, William Henry Hornby and Feilden's father Joseph Feilden, were unseated when Mr Justice Willes found that there had been widespread intimidation of voters. Henry Feilden was elected at the resulting by-election on 31 March 1869, along with William Henry Hornby's son Edward. Both candidates had appealed for support as a tribute to their fathers.

Feilden was re-elected at the 1874 general election, and held the seat until his death in 1875 aged 57.

Parliament of the United Kingdom
Preceded by Joseph Feilden; William Henry Hornby	Member of Parliament for Blackburn; 1869 – 1875; With: Edward Hornby to 1874; William Edward Briggs from 1874	Succeeded by Daniel Thwaites; William Edward Briggs
