= Robert Yerburgh =

British politician

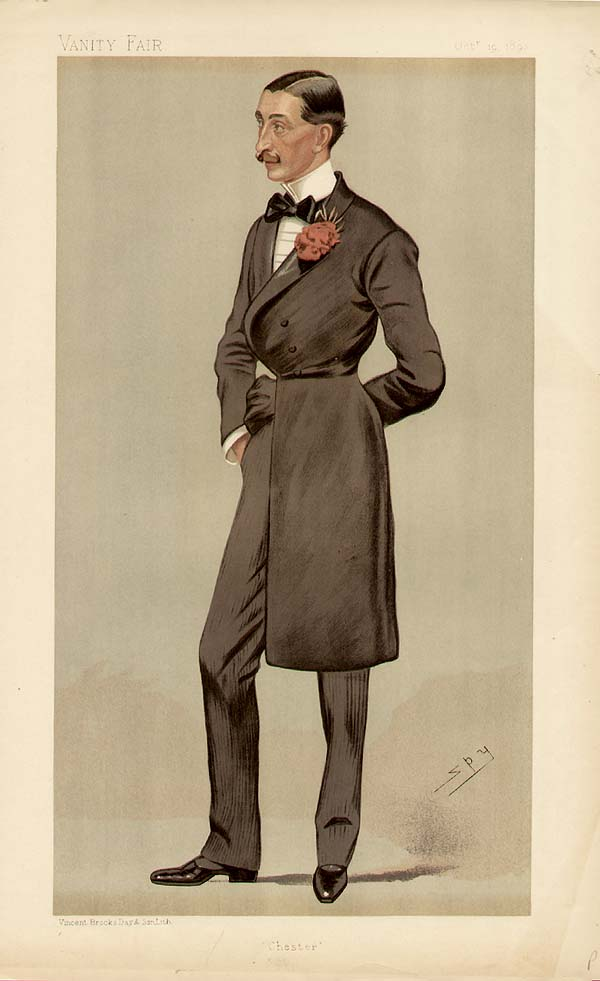
"Chester". Caricature by Spy published in Vanity Fair in 1893.

Robert Armstrong Yerburgh, DL, JP (17 January 1853 – 18 December 1916), was a British barrister and Conservative politician.

== Early life ==
He was the son of the Rev. Richard Yerburgh, vicar of New Sleaford, and Susan Higgin, daughter of John Higgin of Lancaster, and had ten full brothers and sisters; by his father's second marriage in 1863 he had two half-sisters, Annie Constance and Mabel Stanley. He was educated at Rossall School and Harrow School. He matriculated at University College, Oxford in 1873, graduating B.A. at St Alban Hall in 1877. He was called to the bar at the Middle Temple in 1880.

== Career ==
Yerburgh went the northern circuit as a barrister. In 1886, after losing the previous year to Walter Foster, he was elected to the House of Commons for Chester, standing for the Unionists. He lost the seat in 1906, but was elected again in 1910.

In 1916 Yerburgh was intended for a peerage, but he died in December of that year, before the patent had been completed, aged 63. He was also a Deputy Lieutenant for Lancashire and a Justice of the Peace for Kirkcudbrightshire.

== Interests ==
Yerburgh supported the British Produce Supply Organisation, set up in 1896 by Murray Finch-Hatton, 12th Earl of Winchilsea. He acted as president of the National Agricultural Union, and in 1901 introduced a motion in the House of Commons on the food security of the United Kingdom, about which he had grave concerns. When William Lancelot Charleton of Newark set up the British Agricultural Organisation Society, in 1901, to promote co-operatives on a model used already by the Irish Agricultural Organisation Society he became its president.

== Private life ==
In 1888 Yerburgh married Elma Amy, a daughter of Daniel Thwaites, and the couple lived at Billinge Scar, near Blackburn, before moving to Woodfold Hall. On the death of his father-in-law he shared with his wife the ownership of the Thwaites Brewery in Blackburn. They had two sons. Their younger son, Robert, also became a Conservative politician and was elevated to the peerage as Baron Alvingham in 1929 (his older brother, Richard, having died in 1926). Elma Amy Yerburgh died in 1946.

== Coat of Arms ==
Yerburgh’s armorial bearings were per pale argent and azure on a chevron between three chaplets all counterchanged an annulet for the difference and on an escutcheon of pretence the arms of Theaites namely ermine a cross engrailed sable fretty argent in the first and fourth quarter a chaplet of oak vert. The mantling is azure and argent. For a crest: on a wreath of the colours a falcon close or belled of the last preying upon a mallard proper.

The motto “who dares wins” was sometimes used alongside the arms described here.

== Notes ==
Parliament of the United Kingdom
Preceded by Balthazar Foster	Member of Parliament for Chester; 1886 – 1906	Succeeded by Alfred Mond
Preceded by Alfred Mond	Member of Parliament for Chester; 1910 – 1916	Succeeded by Owen Philipps
