= Daniel Thwaites =

English brewer and politician

Member of Parliament for Blackburn
- In office 1875–1880 Serving with William Edward Briggs
- Preceded by: Henry Feilden; William Edward Briggs
- Succeeded by: William Coddington; William Edward Briggs

Personal details
- Born: 1817
- Died: 21 September 1888
- Party: Conservative
- Children: Elma Amy
- Occupation: Brewer, politician

Daniel Thwaites (1817 – 21 September 1888) was an English brewer and a Conservative Party politician from Blackburn in Lancashire. He owned what is now Thwaites Brewery, and sat in the House of Commons from 1875 to 1880.

He was the son of Daniel Thwaites (1777–1843), an excise man who in 1807 had become one of the three partners of the Eanam Brewery in Blackburn, and sole owner of the business in 1824. The younger Daniel inherited the business in partnership with two of his brothers, and became sole owner in 1857.

At the 1874 general election, he unsuccessfully contested the borough of Blackburn. However, he won the seat at a by-election in October 1875 after the death of Henry Master Feilden, and was one of the two Members of Parliament (MPs) for Blackburn until his defeat at the 1880 general election.

== Family ==
In 1859, he married Eliza Amelia Gregory (1824–1907). They had two children, Edward George Duckworth Thwaites who was born on 20 March 1861, but died in the August of the same year and a daughter, Elma Amy (born 30 July 1864), who married Robert Yerburgh, MP for Chester, and inherited the Thwaites Brewery business on the death of her father.

In 1876, he built a large country house, Billinge Scar, on the edge of Blackburn. After his death, it passed to Elma and her husband.

Parliament of the United Kingdom
Preceded by Henry Feilden; William Edward Briggs	Member of Parliament for Blackburn; 1875 – 1880; With: William Edward Briggs	Succeeded by William Coddington; William Edward Briggs
