= A. H. Hornby =

English cricketer (1877–1952)

Albert Henry Hornby
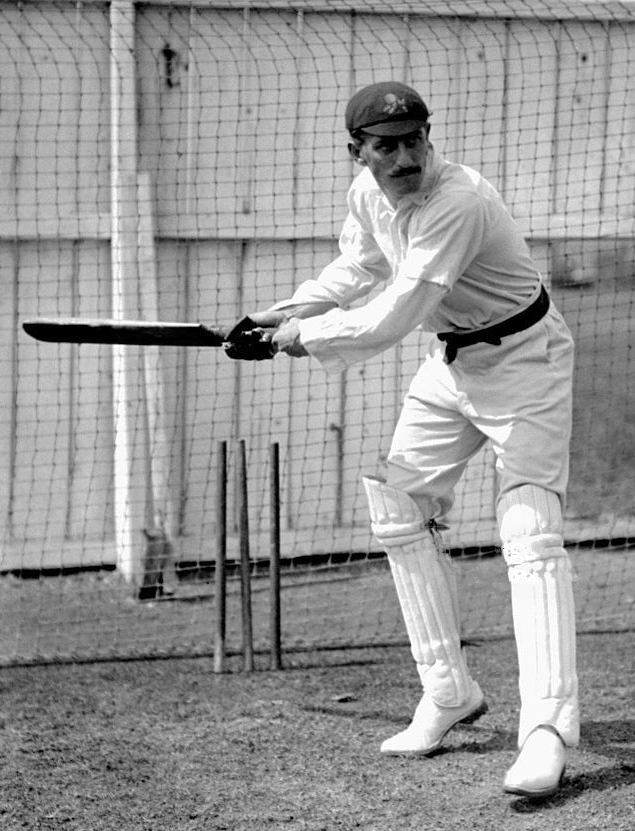
- Born: 29 July 1877; Church Minshull, Cheshire, England
- Died: 6 September 1952 (aged 75); North Kilworth, Leicestershire, England
- Father: A. N. Hornby
- Relatives: John Hornby (brother); Herbert Ingram (maternal grandfather)
- Cricket career

Cricket information
- Batting: Right-handed

Domestic team information
- Years: Team
- 1899–1914: Lancashire County Cricket Club

Career statistics
Competition	First-class
Matches	292
Runs scored	9,784
Batting average	24.58
100s/50s	8/56
Top score	129
Balls bowled	269
Wickets	3
Bowling average	89.66
5 wickets in innings	0
10 wickets in match	0
Best bowling	1/13
Catches/stumpings	217/2
- Source: CricInfo, 27 April 2023
- Military career
- Allegiance: United Kingdom
- Branch: British Army
- Service years: 1914-18
- Rank: Captain
- Unit: Army Remount Service
- Conflicts: World War I

Albert Henry Hornby (29 July 1877 – 6 September 1952) was an English cricketer active from 1898 to 1914 who played for Lancashire. The son of A. N. Hornby, he was born in Church Minshull, Cheshire, and educated at Harrow School and Trinity College, Cambridge. He appeared in 292 first-class matches as a righthanded batsman and an occasional wicketkeeper. He scored 9,784 runs with a highest score of 129 among eight centuries and held 220 catches with one stumping. He was renowned for his daring running between the wickets, quite unusual in his time. Gilbert Jessop referred to him as “a bustler”.

He was the Lancashire club captain from 1908 until 1914. During World War I he served in the Army Remount Service with the rank of Captain. He died in North Kilworth, Leicestershire.
