= Elma Yerburgh =

Elma Amy Yerburgh
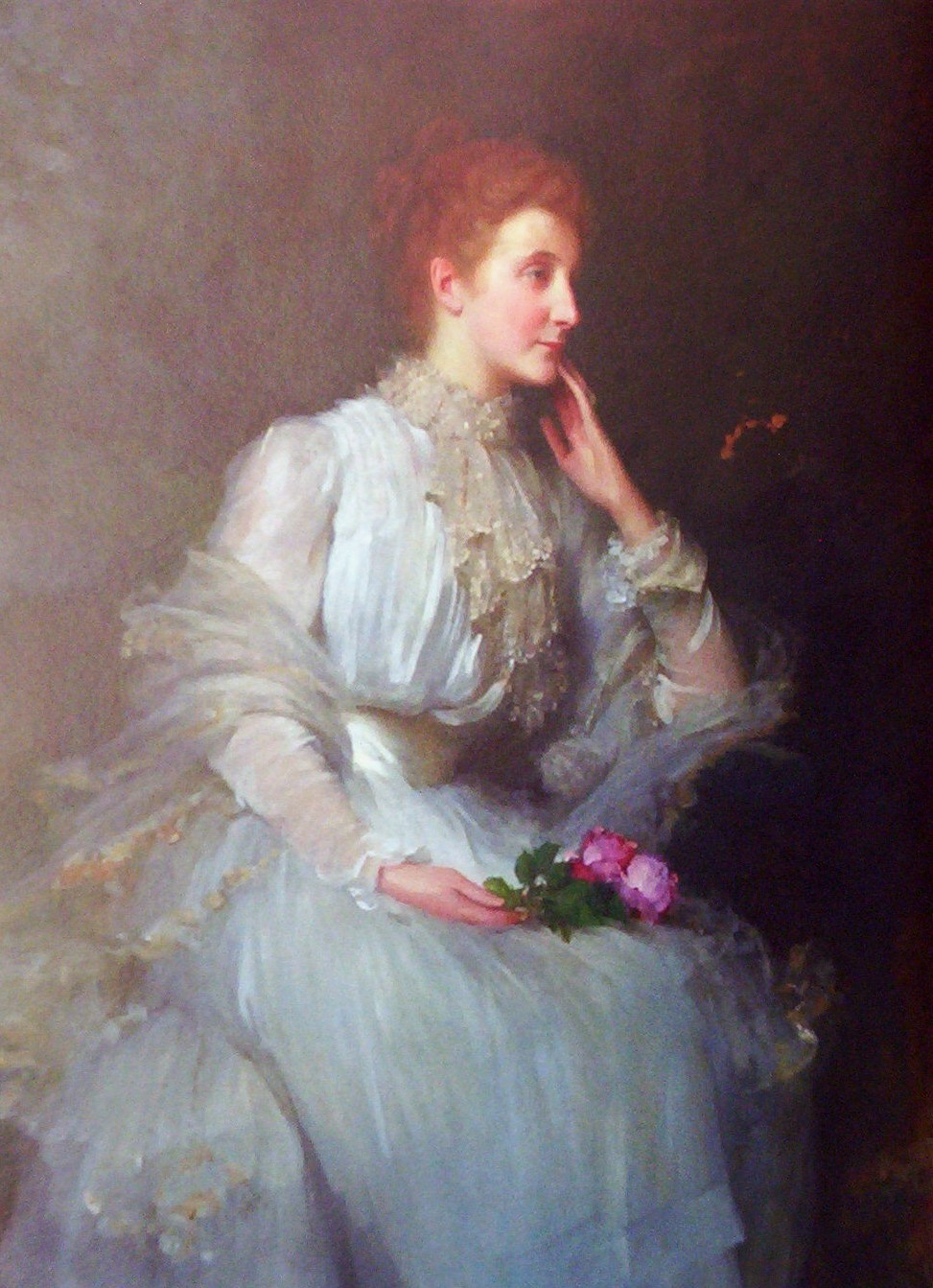
- Born: Elma Amy Thwaites; 30 July 1864; Kensington, England
- Died: 6 December 1946 (aged 82); Barwhillanty, Scotland
- Resting place: Parton kirkyard
- Monuments: Thwaites Empire Theatre
- Occupation: Businesswoman
- Known for: Owner and chairman of Thwaites Brewery
- Spouse: Robert Yerburgh
- Children: Robert Daniel Thwaites Yerburgh; Richard "Guy" Cecil Yerburgh
- Parent: Daniel Thwaites

Elma Amy Yerburgh (née Thwaites, 30 July 1864 – 6 December 1946) was a member of the Thwaites family who was owner and then chairman of the Thwaites Brewery company (of Blackburn, England) from 1888 to 1946. She was the daughter of Daniel Thwaites, M.P. for Blackburn, and was married to Robert Yerburgh, M.P. for Chester. In the town of Blackburn she was known for her generosity to the company's workers and as a public benefactor, who helped fund the construction of the War Memorial wing to Blackburn Royal Infirmary and helped found the town's Empire Theatre, now named after her. Her name was also commemorated in "Elma's Pound", a beer specially brewed by Thwaites Brewery for Christmas 2007 to celebrate their 200th anniversary.

== Family ==
She was born at Addison Lodge in Addison Road, near Holland Park, London, the daughter of Daniel Thwaites and his wife, Eliza Amelia (née Gregory). An older brother, Edward, was born on 20 March 1861, but died in the August of the same year. Daniel Thwaites had taken control of the family brewery business in 1858 following the death of his father and the retirement of his brothers.

In London on 8 August 1888 she married Robert Yerburgh (1853–1916), who had been elected as member of parliament for Chester in the 1886 general election. The couple had first met earlier that year at Winfield House, the home of Sir Harry Hornby, M.P. for Blackburn. The wedding had been postponed for several weeks because of the ill health of her father. Shortly after the marriage, the couple joined her parents at the family estate at Barwhillanty, near Parton, Kirkcudbrightshire, where her father died on 21 September 1888.

There were two sons of the marriage:

- Robert Daniel Thwaites Yerburgh (10 December 1889 – 27 November 1955), who became M.P. for South Dorset and was created the first Baron Alvingham, of Woodfold in the County Palatine of Lancaster on 10 July 1929.
- Richard "Guy" Cecil Yerburgh (5 November 1892 – 13 March 1926), who became a Major in the Irish Guards and was decorated with the Croix de Guerre and the Croce di Guerra and was invested as an Officer of the Order of the British Empire (OBE).

== Thwaites Brewery ==
On the death of her father, Elma and her new husband inherited the family brewery business. Her father's will had made provision for the brewery to be sold, with the proceeds, together with the family estates, to be held in trust for Elma. Despite this, Elma decided to retain the brewery and continue the family business under the management of William Ward, who was executor of her father's will and Elma's cousin, being the son of Daniel's eldest sister, Betsey. During the early years after her marriage, Mrs. Yerburgh left the management of the brewery to William Ward, while she was occupied with family matters, including the birth of her two children. The couple spent most of their time living at Princes Gate in South Kensington and at Billinge Scar, near Blackburn, interspersed with visits to the other family estates before settling at Woodfold Hall.

Prior to the death of Daniel Thwaites, plans had been drawn up to incorporate the business into a limited company. These had been postponed as a result of his death, but were finally put in place in March 1897, after William Ward had left the business. Mrs. Yerburgh transferred the business into the new company, Daniel Thwaites & Co. Limited, for the total of £850,000 (of which £250,000 was placed in the Daniel Thwaites Settlement) in a mixture of ordinary shares, preference shares, debenture stock and cash, with the general public subscribing for £134,000 in new preference shares. Following incorporation, the brewery business continued to expand with a programme of modernisation, extension to the brewery buildings and the purchase of licensed premises.

At the outbreak of the First World War in August 1914, Elma's husband, Robert, was suffering from heart trouble and the couple were in the spa town of Bad Nauheim in Germany. The couple were not allowed to leave immediately and were initially placed under curfew before being detained as prisoners of war under the orders of the military governor of Frankfurt. Nine weeks later, they were allowed to leave and were sent to Switzerland where they were required to stay for three weeks before returning to England. Robert's health continued to deteriorate and he died in December 1916, aged 63.

In the inter-war period, Thwaites embarked on a programme of expansion by the acquisition of competitors and to fund this the directors decided to increase the share capital to £1million in 1922. The first major purchase came in August 1923, when the company acquired Henry Shaw & Co., which owned the New Brewery in Salford (in the centre of Blackburn) and had a strong presence in Darwen. Following the merger, Shaw's chairman, Sir John Rutherford, former M.P for Darwen became a director and substantial shareholder in Thwaites, becoming vice-chairman in 1924.

At the same time, Thwaites bought the James Pickup Wines & Spirits Company, thus enabling them to expand their sales of wines and spirits. In May 1927, Thwaites acquired the Fountain Free Brewery, based in Rishton, together with its 11 tied houses.

== Personality ==
Yerburgh was known for her "careful attention to detail", her "conscientiousness in fulfilling her duties" and her "decisiveness in business matters". She was "an honourable, upright, just and unselfish woman (who) remained singularly modest and retiring all her life". She sometimes appeared "brusque and too forthright" but this disguised an inherent reticent, shy nature. Despite being a generous benefactor and employer, she avoided courting publicity.

=== Generosity as an employer ===
As an employer, she always took a close interest in the welfare of her staff and would often provide treats funded out of her own pocket. A sick workman, or one with an ill family member, would receive extra money and food. When she was told that someone had taken advantage of her generosity, she replied: "As long as I do not miss helping someone in real need, I can stand being bitten."

In December 1897, Mrs. Yerburgh began the tradition of giving a Christmas gift of 10 lbs of prime English beef to each workman and a turkey or goose to office staff. In 1926, despite her managers trying to scrap the Christmas box, she insisted that it be continued, but replaced the beef with £1 for each workman. This gesture became known as "Elma's Pound" and still continues.

During the First World War, many of the brewery's employees served in the armed forces. While employees were away on military service, Mrs. Yerburgh continued to pay their wages and ensured that their families were looked after and that their jobs were kept open until after the end of the war. On their return to work, the men received their backdated wages; the brewery also organised an outing to Blackpool for all ex-servicemen and their families, where they received an envelope containing £25 for each year of military service.

== Homes ==
Mrs. Yerburgh owned several properties across the United Kingdom; at her death these were Woodfold Park near Blackburn, Caythorpe Court in Lincolnshire, and Barwhillanty, in Scotland. During her lifetime, she also had homes in London on Addison Road, Princess Gate and Kensington Gore; at Freeby in Leicestershire and at Bryn Eithin and Cae Eithin in Colwyn Bay in North Wales. Yerburgh Avenue in Colwyn Bay is named after her.

=== Billinge Scar ===
Elma and her husband originally lived at Billinge Scar, to the west of Blackburn (at 53°45′27″N 02°31′7″W), which had been acquired by her father in 1876. It had twelve bedrooms and a schoolroom where Elma was educated and was decorated with an ornate "Elizabethan façade complete with battlements". The property was later purchased by industrialist, William Birtwistle, but was demolished in the 1940s, with only the coach-house remaining.

=== Woodfold Hall ===
The couple later moved into the nearby family home at Woodfold Hall, near Mellor, north-west of Blackburn (at 53°45′32″N 02°33′14″W). The hall was originally built for Henry Sudell, a cotton merchant, in 1799, before being acquired by John Fowden Hindle, who was High Sheriff of Lancashire In the late 1850s, the property was initially rented by Daniel Thwaites Sr. before being purchased by his son in 1865. At its height, the property comprised over 20 ground floor rooms, built surrounding a courtyard; the house stood in a 400-acre estate, with a dairy and small brew house.

During World War II, Mrs. Yerburgh moved away from the property to live in Scotland, and Woodfold Hall became a home for elderly women evacuated from Merseyside. On her death in 1946, the estate was inherited by her son, now Lord Alvingham, but he soon abandoned the property. In May 1949, the house contents were sold by auction and the house roof was removed (to avoid property taxes), allowing the house to decay.

After an initial proposal to redevelop the estate as a golf course in 2000, the hall was refurbished and converted into "luxury apartments". The orangery on the estate is a Grade II listed building.

=== Caythorpe Court ===
In September 1907, she acquired the house and estate at Caythorpe Court in Lincolnshire, following the death of its first owner, Edgar Lubbock, a brewer and banker. Caythorpe Court was the smallest of the properties owned by Mrs. Yerburgh, being referred to by her as "The Cottage". During Mrs. Yerburgh's ownership, the gardens were re-designed by Percy Cane.

During World War I, the property was used as an Auxiliary Military Hospital, with accommodation for 20 officers, at the wishes of Robert Yerburgh; in the next war, it became the headquarters for the 1st Airborne Division Signals. On Mrs. Yerburgh's death in December 1946 her will requested that the estate should be sold to become an Agricultural Education establishment. She also requested that the main buildings should be maintained as near as possible in their original condition. The property was acquired by Lincolnshire County Council, who operated it as the Kesteven Farm Institute; this later became the Kesteven Agricultural College before becoming part of the Leicester-based De Montfort University. It is now operated by PGL as a centre for adventure based holidays for both adults and children.

== The Empire Theatre ==
In February 1910, Mrs. Yerburgh granted a lease (at an annual rent of £12 2s and 6d) on 970 square yards of land she owned at the corner of Aqueduct Road and Bolton Road, Blackburn (at 53°43′56″N 02°29′30″W) to Ferdinand Caton and Christopher Hope who founded the Empire Electric Theatre. Over the years, the theatre changed its identity several times until it was closed in the 1970s. A charitable trust was then formed to acquire the theatre and it eventually re-opened as the Thwaites Empire Theatre in October 2002.

== Blackburn Royal Infirmary ==
The Blackburn and East Lancashire Royal Infirmary had originally opened in 1864 on a site in the Hollin Bank area (at 53°44′10″N 02°29′18″W). On the death of Daniel Thwaites in 1888, Mrs. Yerburgh presented £10,000 to the infirmary in his memory. Robert Yerburgh had been President of the Board of Management of the infirmary, and on his death in 1916, his widow donated a further £3,500 to the hospital.

Following the First World War, the Blackburn Memorial Committee decided to erect a memorial to local men lost in the war by the construction of a new wing, the War Memorial Wing, for which the Mayor, Lawrence Cotton, issued a public appeal to raise £100,000. According to local legend, when the committee approached Thwaites Brewery for a contribution, Mrs. Yerburgh, on being informed that £38,000 was still required, wrote out a cheque for £36,000 saying "I have no doubt the good people of Blackburn and district will donate the rest." By 1923, sufficient funds had been raised to enable construction to commence and on 24 May 1924, after a procession through the streets of Blackburn and amongst much pomp and ceremony, Mrs. Yerburgh laid the foundation stone with the words: "In the faith of Jesus Christ we place this Foundation Stone, In the name of the Father, and of the Son, and of the Holy Ghost. Amen."

On 16 June 1928, construction was complete and Mrs. Yerburgh was invited to formally open the new wing which she did with the words "I hereby declare this War Memorial Wing of the Blackburn and East Lancashire Royal Infirmary to be now open." A bronze plaque was later placed in the entrance hall to the new wing, bearing the inscription:

Blackburn and East Lancashire Royal Infirmary.
WAR MEMORIAL WING
These buildings were erected as a memorial to the men from Blackburn
And East Lancashire who fell in the Great War 1914—1918
The foundation stone was laid by Mrs. R.A. Yerburgh on 24 May 1924
and the opening ceremony performed by her on 16 June 1928.

Nine years later, a ward in the new wing was named after Mrs. Yerburgh.

In 2006, the new Royal Blackburn Teaching Hospital was opened and the Royal Infirmary was closed. The property was sold to Barratt Homes and most of the old infirmary was demolished. The memorial wing has been retained for integration into the re-development of the site and is planned to be converted into 53 apartments. By retaining the War Memorial Wing, it was hoped that "the memory of those men and women of East Lancashire who have laid down their lives for their country will live on and hopefully never be forgotten". In March 2011, the old War Memorial wing was still standing although in a derelict condition with no work going on. By 2018 the War Memorial Wing had been demolished and built over. Commemorative stained glass windows from the structure have been incorporated into corridor design in the new Royal Blackburn Hospital.

== Death ==
For the duration of the Second World War, Mrs. Yerburgh spent most of her time at her Scottish home, "Barwhillanty" near Parton, Kirkcudbrightshire. Now in her eighties and suffering from lack of mobility, she left the day-to-day management of the brewery in the hands of her co-directors. In order to provide for the succession of the family business, she decided to leave her properties to her son Robert (Baron Alvingham), with her shares in the company being passed to her grandsons, John and Oscar (the children of Guy).

Mrs. Yerburgh fell seriously ill in November 1946 and died at Barwhillanty on 6 December, aged 82; she was buried at Parton kirkyard. Her gravestone bears the inscription: "In loving memory of Elma Amy Yerburgh, born 30th July 1864, died 6th December 1946. 'And the spirit shall return unto God who gave it'."

In her will, she made legacies to several charities, continuing the benevolence she had demonstrated all her life. Following her death, she was dubbed Blackburn's "Lady Bountiful".

== Tributes and memorials ==
On 5 September 1935, Mrs. Yerburgh was made an Honorary Freeman of the County Borough of Blackburn; she was the first, and only, woman to be so honoured. In the ceremony awarding the honour, Alderman Taylor said:

Today, we meet to honour a lady who has rendered eminent services for, and done untold good in, her native town. In honouring her, we honour Blackburn. The freedom of the borough is the highest dignity we can confer, and Mrs. Yerburgh richly deserves it. She had ever shown practical sympathy with those less fortunate than herself.

In 1960, a new public house, named the "Elma Yerburgh", was built in King Street, Blackburn (at 53°44′43″N 02°29′23″W), to replace the old Commercial Hotel which had been demolished during the construction of a new housing development at Montague Street. The pub is now the site of a tool hire depot.

In 2007, to commemorate their 200th anniversary, Thwaites Brewery launched a special range of beers including its Christmas beer, Elma's Pound, in recognition of Elma Yerburgh's generosity. The beer (4.9 per cent ABV), was described as a "full-bodied, auburn coloured beer (which) boasts bittersweet flavours with a spicy aromatic finish".

In the history of Thwaites Brewery written by Jehanne Wake, published in 2007 to mark the 200th anniversary of its foundation, John Yerburgh dedicates the book to his grandmother:

She guided the brewery through years of difficulty and two world wars as well as ones of steady expansion and post-war reconstruction. She was a brilliant businesswoman and it is through her skill and foresight that Daniel Thwaites still exists as a family company. As she recognised, the strength of any firm lies in its people. The calibre of the employees today will ensure that the high standards she set for quality and innovation at Thwaites will continue for another 200 years.
