= Joseph Feilden (Blackburn MP) =

British politician (1792–1870)

Member of Parliament for Blackburn
- In office 1857–1869 Serving with William Henry Hornby
- Preceded by: James Pilkington and Montague Joseph Feilden
- Succeeded by: Henry Feilden; Edward Hornby

Personal details
- Born: 28 February 1792 Blackburn, Lancashire, England
- Died: 29 August 1870 (aged 78)
- Parents: Henry Feilden (father); Fanny Hill (mother)
- Relatives: Henry Feilden (son); Randle Feilden (son); William Feilden (uncle); Montague Feilden (cousin)
- Occupation: Landowner & politician

Joseph Feilden (28 February 1792 - 29 August 1870) was a British landowner who represented Blackburn in Parliament from 1865 to 1869.

== Life ==
Feilden was born in Blackburn, the son of Henry Feilden of Witton Park, Blackburn, and his wife Fanny, daughter of William Hill of Blythe Hall, Lathom. He held a commission as a captain in the 1st Lancashire Militia 1812-16 and was appointed High Sheriff of Lancashire in 1818.

He was elected to represent Blackburn as a Conservative at the 1865 general election and re-elected at the 1868 general election, but his election was overturned on petition in 1869 and he was unseated. The election was declared void in March 1869 due to undue influence being exerted by agents of the two successful Conservative candidates, but the court stressed that the candidates themselves had not known of or participated in any corrupt practices. Feilden was thus unseated, and did not contest the following election.

His eldest son Henry Master Feilden (1818-1875) was elected as the Member of Parliament for Blackburn in the subsequent by-election the petition, and held the seat until his death in 1875. Another son, Randle Joseph Feilden (1824-1895), was later the Member of Parliament for North Lancashire and Chorley.

His relatives Sir William Feilden, 1st Baronet of Witton Park, and his son Montague Joseph Feilden, had represented Blackburn from 1832 to 1835 and 1853 to 1857, both as Whigs; Montague Joseph contested the 1868 election against his cousin as a Liberal. A cousin on his mother's side, Richard Willis, inherited a share of the Green Park and Spring Vale slave estates in Jamaica, and claimed around £13,500 compensation under the Slavery Abolition Act 1833; Feilden was the trustee for their claims.

Feilden died in 1870, leaving an estate of around £100,000.
