= Cecil Hornby =

English cricketer

Cecil Lumsden Hornby (25 July 1843 – 27 February 1896) was an English cricketer active from 1874 to 1877 who played for Lancashire. A brother of A. N. Hornby, he was born in Blackburn and died in Leamington Spa. He appeared in two first-class matches as a righthanded batsman. He scored 27 runs with a highest score of 23 and took one wickets with a best analysis of one for 3.
