= Robert Yerburgh, 1st Baron Alvingham =

British politician (1889–1955)

- Lord Alvingham in 1930

Member of Parliament for South Dorset
- In office 15 November 1922 – 30 May 1929
- Preceded by: Angus Hambro
- Succeeded by: Robert Gascoyne-Cecil

Hereditary peerage
- In office 28 June 1929 – 27 November 1955

Personal details
- Born: 10 December 1889
- Died: 27 November 1955 (aged 65)
- Party: Conservative

Robert Daniel Thwaites Yerburgh, 1st Baron Alvingham (10 December 1889 – 27 November 1955) was a British Conservative politician.

Alvingham was the son of Robert Armstrong Yerburgh and Elma Amy Thwaites, and was educated at Harrow and University College, Oxford. He served with the Army Service Corps during First World War (Royal Army Service Corps) since 1922) and achieved the rank of captain in 1917 and Brevet-Major in 1919. In 1922 he was elected to the House of Commons for South Dorset, a seat he held until 1929. His father had been intended for a peerage in 1916 but died before the patent was completed. In the 1929 Dissolution Honours, Yerburgh was raised to the peerage as Baron Alvingham, of Woodfold in the County Palatine of Lancaster.

Lord Alvingham married, firstly, his first cousin Dorothea Gertrude, daughter of John Eardley Yerburgh, in 1911. They had one son and two daughters. After her death in 1927 he married, secondly, Maud Lytton Grey Morgan, daughter of Charles Ford Morgan (an actor known professionally as Lytton Grey), in 1936. They had no children. Lord Alvingham died in November 1955, aged 65, and was succeeded in the barony by his only son Robert. Lady Alvingham died in 1992.

Parliament of the United Kingdom
Preceded by Angus Hambro	Member of Parliament for South Dorset; 1922 – 1929	Succeeded by Viscount Cranborne
Peerage of the United Kingdom
New creation	Baron Alvingham; 1929–1955	Succeeded by Robert Yerburgh
