= 1875 Blackburn by-election =

UK Parliamentary by-election

The 1875 Blackburn by-election was fought on 30 September 1875. The by-election was fought due to the death of the incumbent Conservative MP, Henry Master Feilden. It was won by the Conservative candidate Daniel Thwaites.

Blackburn by-election, 1875
Party	Candidate	Votes	%	±%
Conservative	Daniel Thwaites	5,792	54.5	+2.9
Liberal	Mr Hibbert	4,832	45.5	−3.0
Majority		960	9.0	+8.1
Turnout		10,624	90.6	−3.4
Conservative hold		Swing	+3.0	
