= A. N. Hornby =

English athlete (1847–1925)

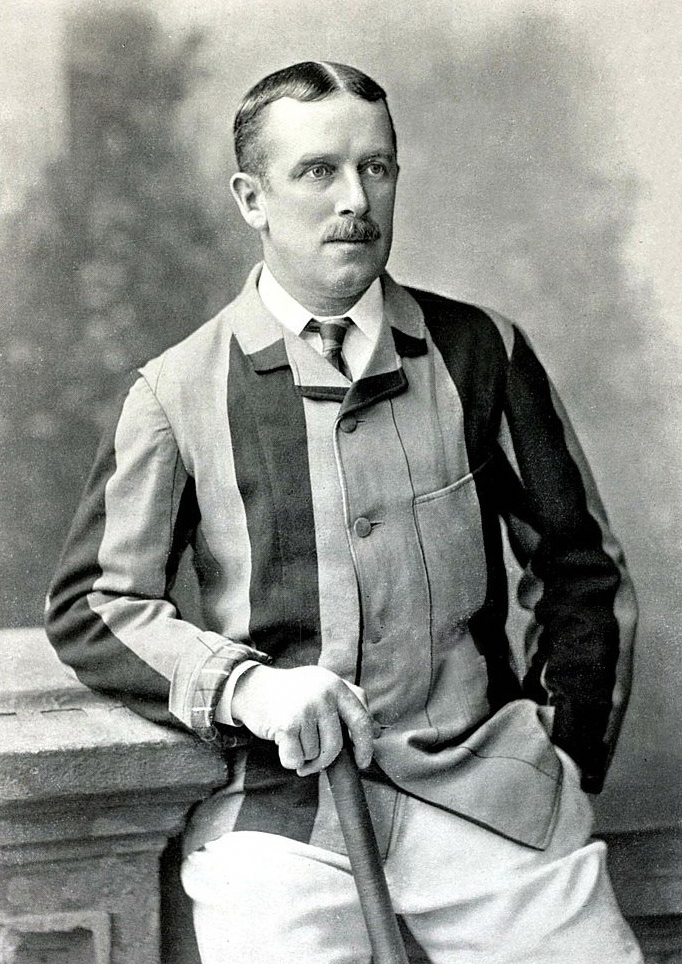
- Hornby pictured in around 1895
- Born: Albert Neilson Hornby; 10 February 1847; Blackburn, Lancashire, England
- Died: 17 December 1925 (aged 78); Nantwich, Cheshire, England
- Resting place: St Mary's Church, Acton, Cheshire
- Other name: Monkey Hornby
- Education: Harrow School
- Spouse: Ada Sarah Ingram
- Father: William Henry Hornby
- Relatives: Cecil Hornby (brother); Edward Hornby (brother); Harry Hornby (brother); Herbert Ingram (father-in-law); John Hornby (son); Albert Hornby (son)
- Cricket career
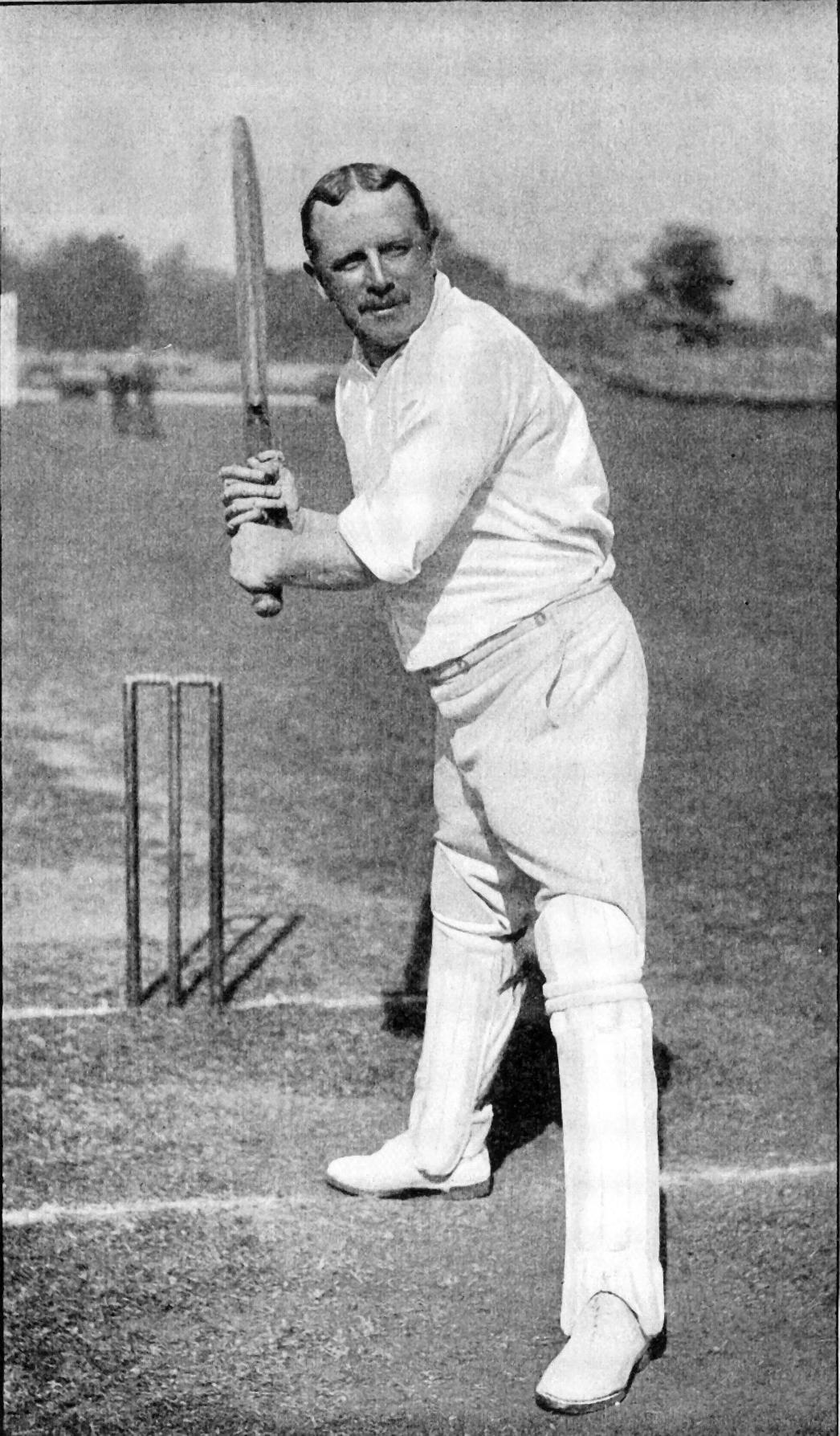
- Hornby in the 1890s

Personal information
- Nickname: Monkey, The Boss
- Batting: Right-handed

International information
- National side: England (1879–1884)
- Test debut (cap 15): 2 January 1879 v Australia
- Last Test: 12 July 1884 v Australia

Domestic team information
- Years: Team
- 1867–1899: Lancashire

Career statistics
Competition	Test	First-class
Matches	3	437
Runs scored	21	16,109
Batting average	3.50	24.07
100s/50s	0/0	16/74
Top score	9	188
Balls bowled	28	593
Wickets	1	11
Bowling average	0.00	23.45
5 wickets in innings	0	0
10 wickets in match	0	0
Best bowling	1/0	4/40
Catches/stumpings	0/–	313/3
- Source: CricketArchive, 22 September 2008

Rugby union career
- Position: three-quarter/full back
Senior career
Years	Team	Apps	(Points)
- Manchester Football Club
–	Lancashire		
International career
Years	Team	Apps	(Points)
1877–1882	England	9	
Association football career
Senior career*
Years	Team	Apps	(Gls)
1878	Blackburn Rovers		
- * Club domestic league appearances and goals

Albert Neilson Hornby, nicknamed Monkey Hornby (10 February 1847 – 17 December 1925) was one of the best-known sportsmen in England during the nineteenth century excelling in both rugby and cricket. He was the first of only two men to captain the country at both rugby and cricket but is also remembered as the England cricket captain whose side lost the Test match which gave rise to the Ashes, at home against the Australians in 1882. Additionally, he played football for Blackburn Rovers.

== Early life ==
He was the sixth son of William Henry Hornby, a cotton mill proprietor and director of the Lancashire & Yorkshire Railway who was Member of Parliament (MP) for Blackburn from 1857 to 1865. His brothers, Edward and Harry, were also MPs for Blackburn from 1869 to 1874, and from 1886 to 1910 respectively. Edward and another brother Cecil also played first-class cricket. Albert attended Harrow School, for whom he played against Eton College at Lord's, and from there returned to Lancashire to join the family business.

== Cricket career ==
Whilst at Harrow, his family had moved to Shrewbridge Hall, Nantwich, Cheshire, and he first played cricket for that county in 1862 and played in 20 matches between then and 1876. His club cricket was for the East Lancashire Club, Blackburn and he was first tried for Lancashire County Cricket Club in 1867. It was with his county that he was to play his finest cricket. From 1869 to 1899 he played 683 innings in first-class cricket with an average of over 24 runs. He played for Lancashire for 33 years, 17 as captain (in 1879–1893 and 1897–1898). For many years he provided an ideal attacking foil to the careful defence of his opening partner, Dick Barlow, with whom he was immortalised in one of the best known of all cricket poems, At Lord's by Francis Thompson which contains the following lines:

It is little I repair to the matches of the Southron folk,
Though my own red roses there may blow;
It is little I repair to the matches of the Southron folk,
Though the red roses crest the caps, I know.
For the field is full of shades as I near a shadowy coast,
And a ghostly batsman plays to the bowling of a ghost,
And I look through my tears on a soundless-clapping host
As the run stealers flicker to and fro,
To and fro:
O my Hornby and my Barlow long ago!

His lack of stature and excess of energy earned him the nickname "Monkey" whilst at school and this stuck, while his players called him "The Boss", for his martinet approach to captaincy. His prowess as a forceful front-foot player, was matched by his fielding abilities. Between 1870 and 1881 he was the only player for Lancashire to reach a century for the club, which he did on seven occasions and in 1881 he topped the national averages, with his 1531 runs including three centuries.

Hornby was unable to carry his county form with the bat into the Test arena, his 3.50 average being a testament to this fact. In his debut Test on the 1878–79 Australian tour (during this tour, Hornby was caught up in the Sydney Riot of 1879) he lost his wicket in both innings to Spofforth; this was to be repeated in his next Test in 1882. The Test match in 1882 was a one-off game played at The Oval in London, England, and the English cricket team lost it to Australia by seven runs. In response, the Sporting Times printed the following "obituary" to English cricket:

In Affectionate Remembrance of ENGLISH CRICKET, which died at the Oval on 29th AUGUST, 1882, Deeply lamented by a large circle of sorrowing friends and acquaintances R.I.P. N.B. – The body will be cremated and the ashes taken to Australia.

Thus was born the greatest rivalry in cricket which to this day is known as The Ashes. AN Hornby captained England in only one more Test (his last), standing in for Lord Harris (who had stood out in protest) in the first Test of 1884. The match was played at Old Trafford on 10, 11 and 12 July 1884 and was drawn. Hornby avoided Spofforth but his 0 and 4 in the two innings remained undistinguished and in the same test match he also became the first player to be stumped in both innings of a single test match.

In addition to his county and country, he also played first-class cricket for Marylebone Cricket Club between 1873 and 1898. Aside from his playing for Lancashire, Hornby also held the posts of Lancashire chairman from 1878 to 1898, and Lancashire president from 1894 to 1916. He denounced the formation of cricket leagues as being against the best interests of the game.

== Rugby career ==
Hornby first played for the Preston Grasshoppers and thence on to Manchester Football Club. His first game for England was on 5 February 1877 under the captaincy of Edward Kewley, a fellow Lancastrian. This match was the first 15-a-side international and was between England and Ireland at the Oval. He played as a three-quarter and despite being 30 years old, kept his place. He was present in the team in 1878 but due to his overseas international cricketing commitments in 1879 was unable to play rugby for his country that year. He was recalled to the side in 1880 as a full back and it was in this position that he was called upon to captain his country in 1882. The game was played in Manchester on 4 March 1882 against Scotland who won by 2 tries to nil. When, later that year, Hornby led the England cricket team out at the Oval to play the Australians he became the first man to captain his country in both sports and this in his 36th year. He is one of only two men to have captained England at both these sports, the other being Andrew Stoddart.

== Association football ==
As well as becoming captain of the national side for both cricket and rugby, Hornby was also selected to play for Blackburn Rovers in their inaugural game at Alexandra Meadows, against Partick Thistle on 2 January 1878. He played for them in a few subsequent matches. He later appeared for Nantwich where he also served as Club President.

Newspaper correspondence in the 1950s suggests the 1877 formation of Crewe Alexandra Football Club as an offshoot of Crewe Alexandra Cricket Club was proposed by Hornby, who elicited the support of 'Thomas Abrams' (presumably Thomas Abraham) and other founders.

== Personal life ==
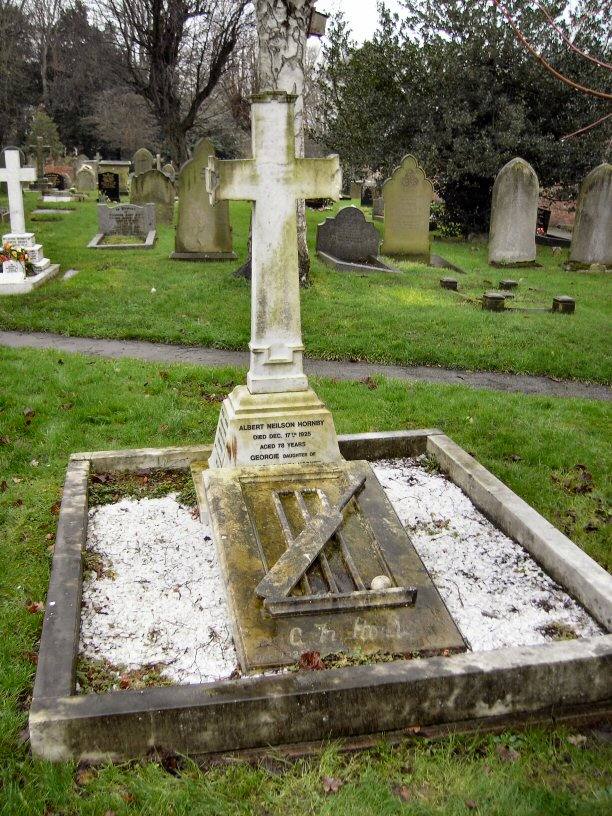
Tombstone of A.N. Hornby

In 1876 he married Ada Sarah Ingram, the daughter of Herbert Ingram MP, the founder and proprietor of The Illustrated London News. With Ada he lived in Church Minshull, Nantwich and they had four sons all of whom went to Harrow. George Vernon (1879–1905) died in South Africa, having served in the Boer War whilst Walter Ingram (1878–1918) died of wounds received in France. The youngest, John, (1880–1927) was also wounded during the First World War, was awarded the Military Cross, and later died when exploring in the north of Canada. The eldest son, Albert Henry (1877–1952) went on to Trinity College, Cambridge and like his father played and captained Lancashire. Between 1899 and 1914 he played 283 matches – only nine matches fewer than his father.

Hornby was also a Captain of 1st Royal Cheshire Militia. He died at Parkfield, Nantwich, Cheshire on 17 December 1925, and was buried in the churchyard of St Mary's Church in nearby Acton.

== Portrayals ==
Hornby is one of the main characters in the Netflix mini-series "The English Game" (2020), played by Harry Michell.

Sporting positions
Preceded by Alfred Shaw	English national cricket captain 1882	Succeeded by Honourable Ivo Bligh
Preceded by Charles Gurdon	English National Rugby Union Captain; Mar 1882	Succeeded by Edward Gurdon
