= Mellor, Lancashire =

Village in Lancashire, England

Coordinates: 53.779°N 2.531°W

Mellor
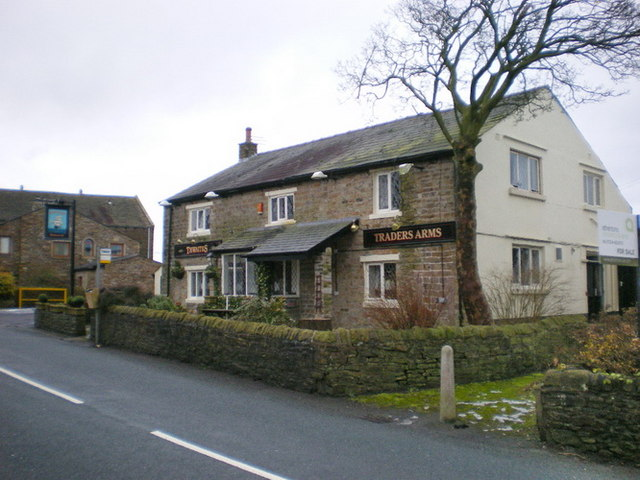
- The Traders Arms public house, Mellor

- Shown within Ribble Valley Location within Lancashire
- Population: 2,174 (2021)
- OS grid reference: SD654309
- Civil parish: Mellor
- District: Ribble Valley
- Shire county: Lancashire
- Region: North West
- Country: England
- Sovereign state: United Kingdom
- Post town: BLACKBURN
- Postcode district: BB1, BB2
- Dialling code: 01254
- Police: Lancashire
- Fire: Lancashire
- Ambulance: North West
- UK Parliament: Ribble Valley

Mellor is a village situated in the Borough of Ribble Valley in Lancashire, England. The population of the civil parish at the census of 2021 was 2,174.

== Toponymy ==
The name Mellor is first attested around 1130, in the form Malver, with forms such as Meluer appearing thereafter. Its origin lies in the Common Brittonic words which survive in modern Welsh as moel ("bare") and bre ("hill"). Thus the name once meant "the bare hill".

== Geography ==
Mellor has two churches, one Church of England parish church (St Mary's) and one Methodist, as well as a primary school, three public houses and a hotel. It also boasts a post office and general store, a hair salon, a beauty salon, a high-quality butcher's shop, a pharmacy and a private-hire company. There are also three disused quarries, and the remains of an eel farm destroyed by fire in the 1990s.

Stanley House is a 16th-century building listed on the English Heritage Register. It is now a hotel and spa.

Atop the highest hill on Mellor Moor, overlooking the village, is the site of a Roman signalling station, and a now disused Royal Observer Corps Nuclear Blast and Fallout Monitoring Station. The monitoring post was opened in July 1959, was decommissioned in October 1968, and is situated on a low mound ten yards west of a trig point overlooking BAE Samlesbury Airfield. Many people still believe this was a nuclear shelter or an air-raid shelter for the use of the local population during times of war. A millennium viewpoint pillar has been erected alongside, encroaching on the top of the post. Mellor has a village hall, situated near the centre of the village. It hosts sports such as football, tennis, bowls and hockey.

The hall is also used for other activities such as line dancing, disco parties and exercise classes. The hall is available for hire, and functions as the community centre for the village, where residents can go to discuss how to improve the local area.

Close to the village hall is a playing field and a tennis court, very popular in the summer. In the centre of the village is a playground, adjacent to a small public library and a doctor's surgery which share the same building. The local populace is generally middle-class and middle-aged, though the tranquil rolling hills and tight sense of community have made it a prime retirement location.

Mellor is linked to Mellor Brook, another small village, which features a bakery, post office with general store, an art gallery and the Feildens Arms, a public house. The hub of Mellor Brook is the Community Centre, which was originally a chapel before becoming a primary school, which closed in 1962.

In 1966 the building became a community centre, having been bought from the church, to be maintained as a Registered Charity until this day.

== See also ==
- Listed buildings in Mellor, Lancashire
