= 1916 Colne Valley by-election =

UK parliamentary by-election

The 1916 Colne Valley by-election was a parliamentary by-election held on 25 August 1916 for the UK House of Commons constituency of Colne Valley, in the West Riding of Yorkshire.

== Vacancy ==
The by-election was caused by the disqualification of the sitting Liberal MP, the Reverend Dr. Charles Leach under the Lunacy (Vacating of Seats) Act 1886. Leach had been an army chaplain during the war, visiting the wounded, and the strain of this task, coupled with his Parliamentary duties apparently caused him to suffer the breakdown which was to lead his committal to a private lunatic asylum. Leach thus became the only MP ever to be disqualified from Parliament in accordance with the provisions of this Act. Leach had been MP for Colne Valley since the January 1910 general election when he defeated the Independent Labour Party MP Victor Grayson.

== Candidates ==
The Liberals chose Frederick Mallalieu as their candidate. Mallalieu was a woollen manufacturer from Delph near Oldham and a member of the West Riding County Council, having been chairman of the Finance Committee since 1912. Mallalieu was descended from French Huguenot Protestants who had fled France in the seventeenth century. In accordance with the wartime electoral truce between the political parties and their participation in the coalition government of H H Asquith, the Conservative and Labour parties declined to stand candidates and it was expected they would support Mallalieu as the government nominee.

== Result ==
There being no other candidates, Mallalieu was returned unopposed.

Colne Valley by-election, 1916
Party	Candidate	Votes	%	±%
Liberal	Frederick Mallalieu	Unopposed	N/A	N/A
Liberal hold				

== See also ==
- List of United Kingdom by-elections
- United Kingdom by-election records
- 1907 Colne Valley by-election
- 1939 Colne Valley by-election
- 1963 Colne Valley by-election
