= Nellie Hall =

British suffragette

- Born: about 1893; Eccles, Lancashire, England
- Died: 26 July 1976 (aged 82–83); Cobourg, Ontario, Canada
- Other names: Nell Hall, Nellie Hall-Humpherson, Nell Humpherson, "Marie Roberts" (pseudonym)
- Parent: Leonard Hall
- Relatives: Spencer Timothy Hall (grandfather)

Nellie Hall (about 1893 – 26 July 1976), later known as Nell Hall-Humpherson, was a British suffragette, arrested and imprisoned several times for her activities with the Women's Social and Political Union (WSPU).

== Early life ==
Nellie Hall was born in Eccles, Lancashire, the daughter of Leonard Hall and Martha Alice Hall. Her father was a journalist active in the Independent Labour Party (ILP). Her mother was a suffragette, with the Women's Social and Political Union from its founding in 1903. Her grandfather Spencer Timothy Hall was a homeopathic doctor and writer. Nellie Hall was early exposed to political and cultural discussions in a home that hosted visitors such as Emmeline Pankhurst and George Bernard Shaw. She began her political activism while still in her teens, in 1909, when she joined the nightly protests against force-feeding outside Winson Green Prison.

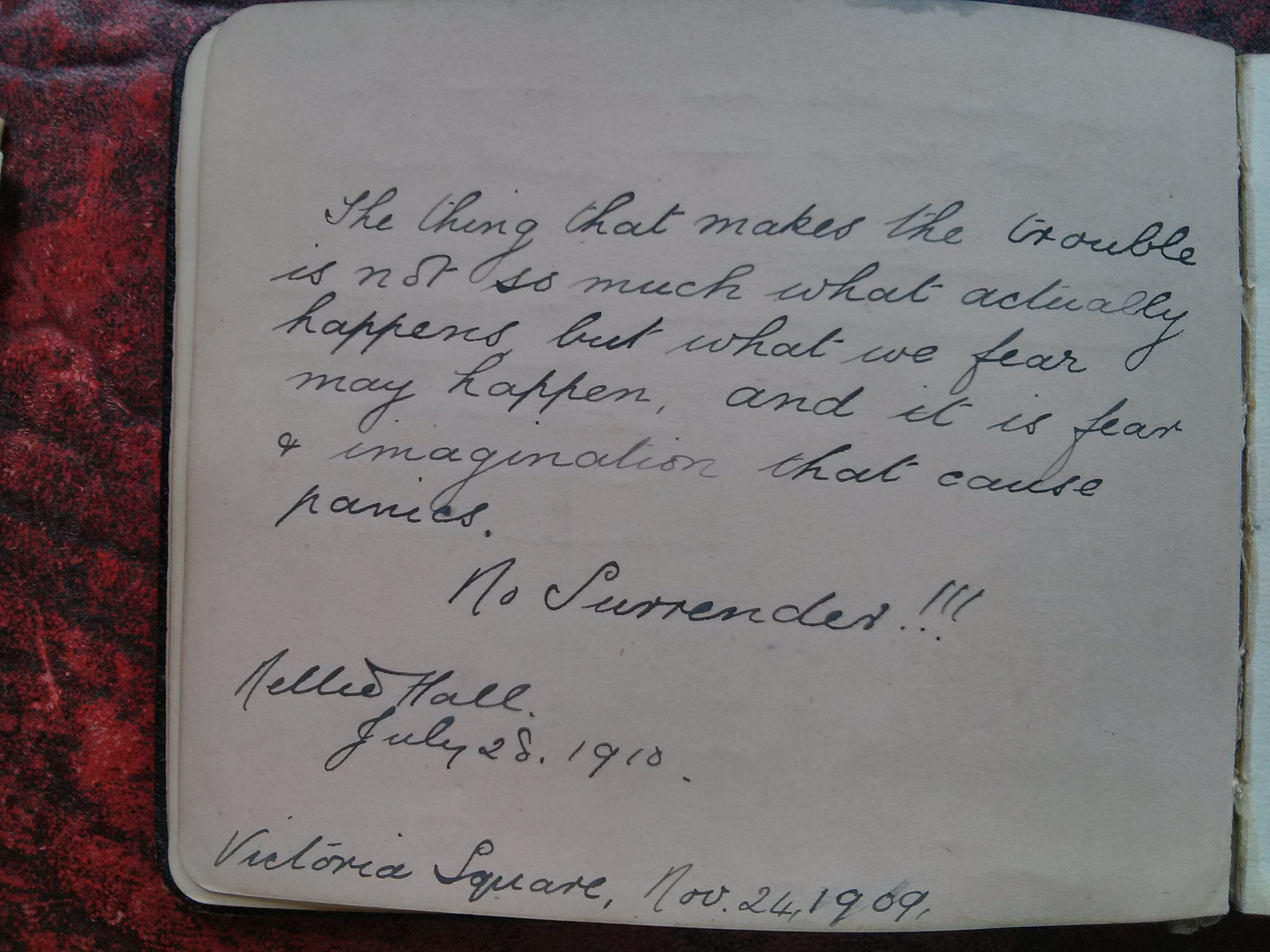
Dedication by Nellie Hall in Mabel Capper's WSPU prisoners scrapbook October 1910 (Transcribed: "The thing that makes the trouble is not so much what actually happens but what we fear may happen and it is fear & imagination that cause panics. No Surrender!!! Nellie Hall, July 28, 1910; Victoria Square, November 26, 1909.")

== Suffrage ==
Hall worked for the WSPU in Birmingham from 1911 to 1913 until she was arrested for throwing a brick through the window of Prime Minister H. H. Asquith's car on 21 July 1913. She was sentenced to three weeks in prison, for which she was awarded a Hunger Strike Medal 'for Valour' by the WSPU but was released after eight days, suffering from mumps.

Hall moved to London (disguised as a housemaid and using the name "Marie Roberts") and continued her activism as a covert organizer. In 1914 she was arrested along with her mother and sister Emmeline, and three other women (Grace Arnes, Julia Jameson, and Grace Roe), for participating in a conspiracy and concealing an arsenal of pebbles and "window smashing equipment" in their Maida Vale flat. As she was carried out of court during her trial, she waved her handkerchief to supporters and cried, "It doesn't matter; we shall go on fighting, fighting, fighting". She was sentenced to three months, went on hunger strike, and was force-fed at Holloway Prison. She wrote a pamphlet as "Marie Roberts" about her suffrage work and prison experience.

Nellie moved back to Birmingham during the First World War, where she joined the Post Office and became the first mail sorter for the British Expeditionary Force. in 1928, through the intervention of Flora Drummond, she was persuaded to act as secretary and liaison officer for Emmeline Pankhurst, whom she nursed through her final illness. She carried the WSPU flag at Pankhurst's funeral.

== Personal life ==
In 1920 Nellie Hall married a schoolmaster, Herbert Humpherson, and settled in Warwickshire. She had sons David Hall-Humpherson and Peter Hall-Humpherson. Following Emmeline Pankhurst's death, the Humphersons emigrated to Canada in 1929. Nell Hall-Humpherson lived in Nova Scotia and Toronto, where she was president of the Soldiers' Wives Association during World War II, and a life member of the Association of Women Electors in Toronto.

In 1962, she appeared as the mystery guest on the Canadian television programme Front Page Challenge, and in 1965 she gave several newspaper interviews about her suffrage years. She was interviewed again on Canadian television, by Pierre Berton, in 1971. She died in 1976, aged 83, in Cobourg, Ontario.

== See also ==
- List of suffragists and suffragettes
