= Martin Wainwright (journalist) =

British journalist and author

Martin Wainwright MBE
- Born: Leeds, England
- Education: Shrewsbury School
- Alma mater: Oxford University
- Occupations: Journalist and author
- Parent: Richard Wainwright (father)
- Relatives: Hilary Wainwright (sister)

Martin Wainwright is a British journalist and author. He left The Guardian after 37 years at the end of March 2013.

== Early life ==
Wainwright was born in Leeds, and educated at Shrewsbury School and Oxford University. His father Richard Wainwright was the Liberal MP for Colne Valley (1966–70, February 1974–87) after a career in accountancy.

== Career ==
Wainwright was The Guardian's Northern Editor for 17 years until the end of 2012, when he was succeeded by Helen Pidd. His contributions to the newspaper have mostly reflected this emphasis but not exclusively.

Wainwright has written several books on northern or countryside topics, including a biography of the unrelated Alfred Wainwright and a guide to the Coast to Coast Walk. He has also written books on the Morris Minor and Mini cars. He writes a blog about another interest, moths.

Wainwright was awarded an MBE in the 2000 New Year Honours, "For services to the National Lottery Charities Board in Yorkshire and Humberside."

He was awarded an honorary degree by the University of Leeds in 2013.

== Personal life ==
Wainwright is chair of the trustees of the Scurrah Wainwright Charity, named after his grandfather Henry Scurrah Wainwright OBE (1877–1968), a Leeds chartered accountant with interests in social reform and delphiniums, and a trustee of the Andrew Wainwright Reform Trust, named for his brother who died in 1974.

One of Wainwright's two sisters, Hilary, is the radical academic who has long been associated with the Red Pepper magazine.

His two sons are both journalists – Oliver is The Guardian's architecture and design critic and Tom is the Economist's Mexico City bureau chief.

== Selected publications ==
- Wainwright: the Man Who Loved the Lakes, 2007, BBC Books, ISBN 978-1-84607-294-9
- Guardian Book of the Countryside (By Ruth Petrie & Martin Wainwright), 2008, Cornerstone, ISBN 978-0-85265-109-4
- A Mini Adventure: 50 years of the iconic small car, 2009, Aurum Press, ISBN 978-1-84513-471-6
- True North 2009, Guardian Books, ISBN 978-0-85265-213-8
- Morris Minor; the Biography: sixty years of Britain's favourite car 2010, Aurum Press, ISBN 978-1-84513-509-6
- The Coast to Coast Walk (Recreational Path Guides), 2010 (revised ed), Aurum Press, ISBN 978-1-84513-560-7
- Wild City: Encounters with Urban Wildlife, 25 May 2011, Aurum Press, ISBN 978-1-84513-529-4
