= Oliver Wainwright =

British architecture and design critic (born 1985)

- Born: July 1984 (age 42); England
- Education: University of Cambridge, Royal College of Art
- Occupation: Architecture critic
- Parent: Martin Wainwright

Oliver Wainwright (born July 1984) is a British architecture and design critic. He has written for the British newspapers The Guardian and The Times and is the Features Editor for the industry magazine Building Design. He trained and worked as an architect before becoming a journalist

Oliver Wainwright attended Benton Park School in Leeds before going on to study architecture at the University of Cambridge, graduating with a double first, before the Royal College of Art.

As well as being a writer and journalist, Wainwright has collaborated on design projects with the Architecture Foundation and the National Building Museum, and has lectured at several British architecture schools. He is the son of former Guardian journalist Martin Wainwright. He is the grandson of Richard Wainwright, a former merchant banker and Liberal MP for Colne Valley.

Wainwright has praised the work of architect firm Stanton Williams and defended the company's design of the Sainsbury Laboratory after it won the 2012 RIBA Stirling Prize, despite its superficially prefabricated style. He has criticised the design of the Liverpool Museum, highlighting problems of being over budget and in his opinion too close to the Liverpool Maritime Mercantile City, at the time a UNESCO World Heritage Site. He described the restaurant in the Walkie Talkie tower at 20 Fenchurch Street as "like being in an airport terminal". In 2025, he described the new Foster + Partners-designed New York global headquarters of bank JPMorgan Chase as "a bullying affront to the skyline".
