= Thelma Walker =

British politician

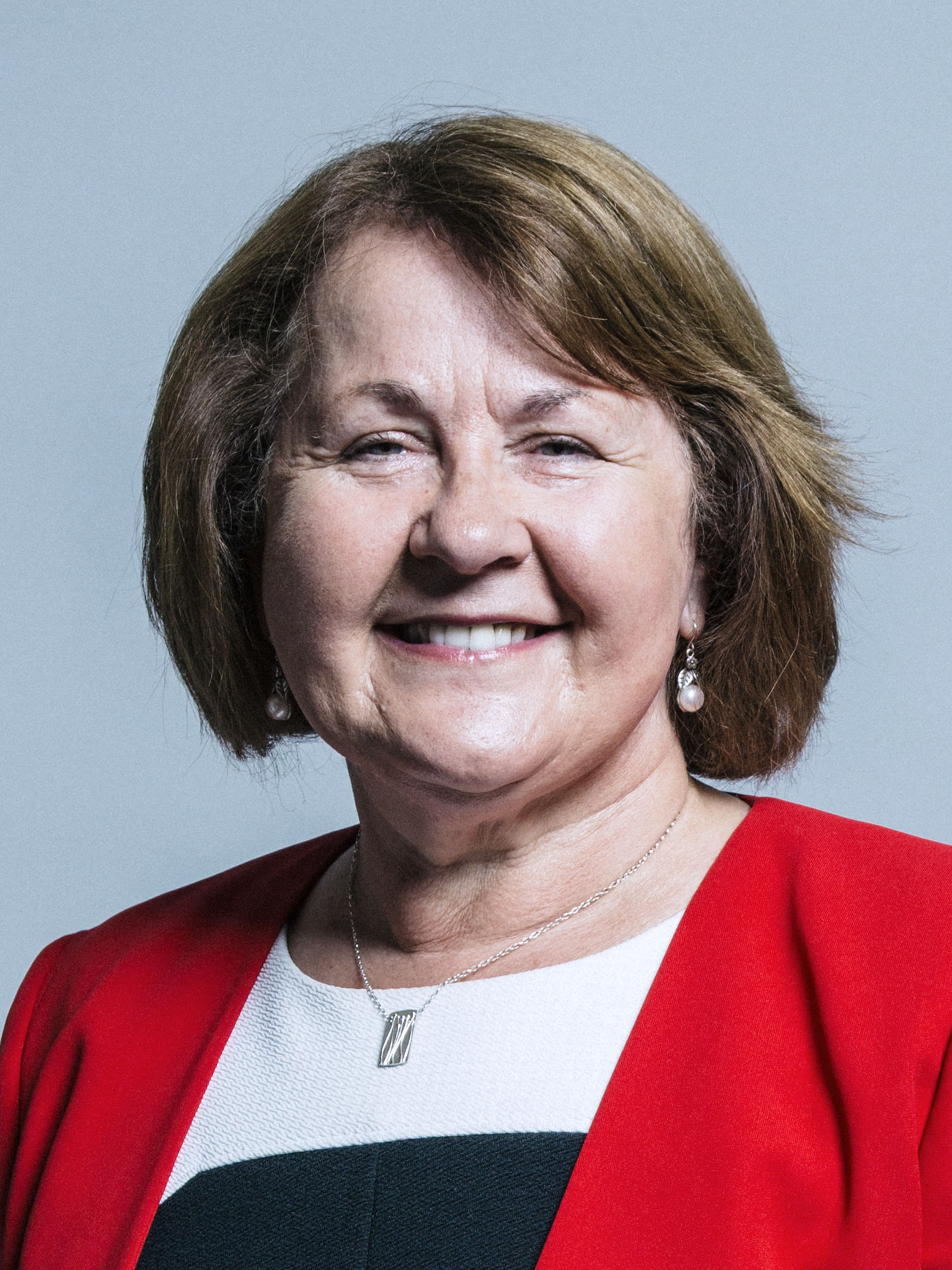
- Official portrait, 2017

Member of Parliament for Colne Valley
- In office 8 June 2017 – 6 November 2019
- Preceded by: Jason McCartney
- Succeeded by: Jason McCartney

Personal details
- Born: 7 April 1957 (age 69)
- Party: Green Party of England and Wales (since 2025)
- Other political affiliations: Northern Independence Party (2021–2024); Labour (1971–2020)
- Spouse: Rob Walker (m. 1983)
- Children: 2
- Education: Marple Hall Grammar School; Manchester Polytechnic

Thelma Doris Walker (born 7 April 1957) is a British politician, formerly the Labour Party Member of Parliament (MP) for Colne Valley from 2017 to 2019. Before her political career, she worked as a teacher for 34 years and later as an independent consultant.

In November 2020 Walker resigned from the Labour Party. In May 2021, she stood as an independent candidate endorsed by the Northern Independence Party (NIP) in the 2021 Hartlepool by-election and lost her deposit. In 2025, she announced on Twitter that she had joined the Green Party of England and Wales.

== Early life and teaching career ==
Born on 7 April 1957, Walker attended Marple Hall Grammar School in Manchester, England. She graduated in 1978 with a bachelor's degree in Education from Manchester Polytechnic (now Manchester Metropolitan University). For twelve years afterwards, she worked as a teacher in Stockport, then moved to Kirklees, West Yorkshire. Walker was the headteacher of Overthorpe C of E School and Flockton C of E First School. After 34 years as a teacher, she became an independent consultant in 2012.

== Political career ==
=== Labour Party ===
Walker was elected as the MP for Colne Valley in the 2017 general election with a majority of 915 (1.5%) votes. The seat had previously been held by Conservative Party politician Jason McCartney since 2010. Walker made her maiden speech on 27 June 2017. She sat on the Education Select Committee from September 2017 until November 2019 and was a member of the Welsh Affairs Select Committee between January and February 2018.

Walker served as the Parliamentary Private Secretary to Shadow Chancellor of the Exchequer John McDonnell.

She was a signatory of the 'MPs Not Border Guards' pledge, which vowed not to report constituents to the Home Office for immigration enforcement. Walker was a supporter of the Labour Against Private Schools campaign, which aims to commit Labour to abolishing private schools in the United Kingdom.

Walker supported the United Kingdom remaining within the European Union in the 2016 EU membership referendum. In the indicative votes on 27 March 2019, she voted for a referendum on a Brexit withdrawal agreement, and for a customs union with the EU.

Walker lost her seat in the 2019 general election to Jason McCartney of the Conservatives, whom she had previously unseated as the MP in 2017.

On 18 November 2020, almost a year after losing her seat, she resigned her membership of the Labour Party on the evening after party leader Keir Starmer readmitted Jeremy Corbyn, who had immediately preceded him in that office, to the party but not to the Parliamentary Labour Party. She later explained that she left because she felt Starmer was being spiteful towards Corbyn, even prior to his suspension, and because she had concerns about the party's positions on the Covert Human Intelligence Sources Bill and on schools being open during the COVID-19 pandemic.

=== Northern Independence Party ===
On 24 March 2021, Walker declared her support for the Northern Independence Party, which campaigns for northern England to become an independent country, and on 28 March was announced as the party's candidate for the 2021 Hartlepool by-election. On her decision to join the NIP, Walker said: "As a northerner, I have witnessed the 'managed decline' of northern towns and the empty promises of the 'Northern Powerhouse' for too long. The reality is that public transport is much cheaper and connectivity far better in London, education is far better funded and council tax in Westminster is far lower than in many of the most deprived northern towns. These factors, along with the belief by many northerners that their voices are not heard in Westminster, gives impetus to new and emerging parties." She also stated that she believed Scottish and Welsh independence were both likely, as well as Irish reunification, and then "what is left will be little Englanders, and the north still being run by the Westminster establishment. You can see the role of NIP here if you look over the next few decades of how it could pan out and I just see that as part of the change that is needed."

Whilst admitting her chances of getting elected in Hartlepool were slim, she told the Morning Star: "I'm going for it, I'd love to be the voice for Hartlepool in Westminster, change it from within and have a go at that government front bench, even as one independent voice. I'm being realistic, this is about a bigger movement and about the start of something. And I think that's what has rattled the cages of Labour and co." As the NIP failed to register with the Electoral Commission before nominations closed, Walker was listed on the ballot as an independent. At the by-election, she finished in 8th place with 250 votes.

=== People's Alliance of the Left ===
On 20 January 2022, Walker announced that the NIP, Breakthrough Party, TUSC and Left Unity had agreed a "memorandum of understanding" as part of the People's Alliance of the Left (PAL). The announcement stated the parties would work on a "future electoral strategy." As part of this group, all PAL members endorsed Dave Nellist, of the Trade Union and Socialist Coalition, in the 2022 Birmingham Erdington by election. In November 2022, it was announced that the Liverpool Community Independents had joined the alliance.

=== Green Party ===
In July 2024 Walker announced that she had voted for the Green Party in the 2024 United Kingdom general election. In September 2025, Walker announced on X that she had joined the Greens.

== Personal life ==
She is married to Rob Walker, who was a Labour councillor for Colne Valley ward of Kirklees Council until his resignation from the Labour Party in November 2020 along with two other Labour councillors. This resulted in Labour losing their majority on the Council. Thelma and Rob have two children. She is a trustee of Slaithwaite Civic Hall.

In February 2021, Walker and her friend Tom Widdicombe began hosting a weekly podcast titled Thelma and Tom Look Left. Guests on the podcast have included Labour MPs such as Rebecca Long-Bailey, Richard Burgon, Dawn Butler, Clive Lewis and John McDonnell; journalists Ash Sarkar and Owen Jones; and Red Pepper editor Hilary Wainwright.

Parliament of the United Kingdom
Preceded by Jason McCartney	Member of Parliament for Colne Valley; 2017–2019	Succeeded by Jason McCartney
