= Friend (The One with Gunther) =

Friends parody-comedy theatre play

FRIEND (The One With Gunther) is a one-person comedic stage show created and performed by British-Irish comedy writer Brendan Murphy. It is a parody and tribute to the television seriesFriends, condensing all ten seasons into a single, 70-minute performance.

== Concept ==
The show follows Gunther, the infamously lovelorn coffee shop worker, as he recounts the events that transpired across all ten seasons of Friends.

== Reception ==
The show has received generally positive reviews for its humour and fast-paced nature. The Stage commended the show for being "packed with enough well observed detail to satisfy even the most obsessive fan", The Advertiser called it "Hysterical... a must-see for old and new fans of FRIENDS", The Scotsman calling it "a fan-friendly checklist of the show's biggest plot points" and Fest Magazine viewed it as "a pleasing nostalgic trip to Central Perk".

== Accolades ==
- Best Play at the World Wide Comedy Awards 2021.
- Nominated for the 2023 Offie Off Fest Award.

== Tours ==
FRIEND (The One With Gunther) has toured extensively across the UK, Canada, Australia, and Europe. It was filmed for streaming at Wilton's Music Hall in London's East End
