= The Oaks Academy (Cheshire) =

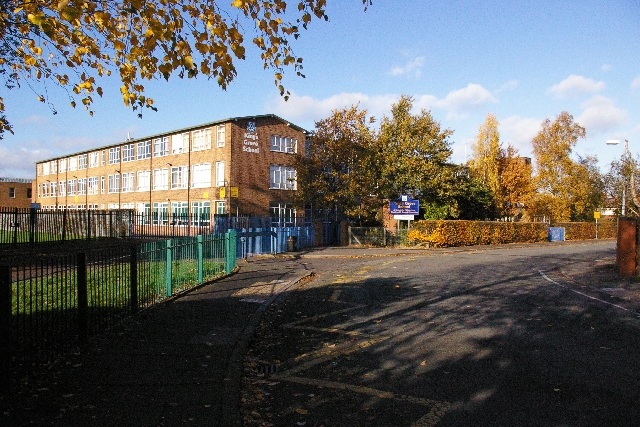
- The school seen from Buchan Grove (2006)

Location
- Buchan Grove; Crewe, Cheshire, CW2 7NQ; England
- Coordinates: 53°05′29″N 2°27′25″W

Information
- Type: Academy
- Founder: School founded by local authority ( when opened it was known as King's Way)
- Local authority: Cheshire East
- Department for Education URN: 147654 Tables
- Ofsted: Reports
- Headteacher: Peter Kingdom
- Staff: 100+
- Gender: Mixed
- Age: 11 to 16
- Enrolment: 489
- Website: www.theoaksacademy.co.uk

The Oaks Academy (formerly King's Grove High School) is a mixed secondary school located on Buchan Grove in Crewe, Cheshire, England.

== History ==
The site was the former Crewe Grammar School for Girls.

It was previously a foundation school administered by Cheshire East Council, King's Grove High School.

The school converted to academy status in January 2016 and was renamed the Oaks Academy. However the school continues to coordinate with Cheshire East Council for admissions.

== Notable former pupils ==
=== Crewe Grammar School for Girls ===
- Kali Mountford (née Newton), Labour MP from 1997 to 2010 for Colne Valley
