= Colne Valley Labour Union =

- Founded: 21 July 1891
- Dissolved: 1918
- Succeeded by: Colne Valley Constituency Labour Party
- Headquarters: Slaithwaite
- Newspaper: Worker
- Ideology: Labourism
- Political position: Left-wing

The Colne Valley Labour Union (CVLU) was a political party based in the Colne Valley, in Yorkshire, in England. The first labour party organised on the basis of a Parliamentary constituency, it successfully backed Tom Mann as secretary of the Independent Labour Party, and Victor Grayson as the local Member of Parliament. Its successor is the Colne Valley Constituency Labour Party.

== Establishment ==
On 16 November 1890, members of the Slaithwaite branch of the Amalgamated Society of Railway Servants decided to form a trade union club. Following a series of organising meetings, they secured a cellar on Nabbs Lane, naming it the Social Democratic Club, and displayed a red flag inside.

By 1891, there was considerable interest in trade union candidates for elected offices, independent of existing political parties, inspired by the example of the Bradford Labour Union. In mid-July, the Yorkshire Factory Times published a letter signed "A Colne Valley Voter", which called for a labour candidate in the Colne Valley Parliamentary seat at the next general election.

At the Social Democratic Club, on 21 July 1891, a meeting was held, chaired by G. W. Haigh. James Bartley of the Bradford Labour Union was present, along with Allan Gee and Ben Turner, leading figures in the locally based West Riding Power Loom Weavers' Association. On the proposal of two local trade unionists, George Henry Cotton and George Garside, the meeting agreed to form the Colne Valley Division Labour Union. Unlike the Bradford Labour Union organisation, it would cover a single Parliamentary constituency, and it was agreed to invite Tom Mann to contest it at the next general election.

The first committee of the organisation consisted of George Garside (president), Kossuth Pogson (treasurer), George W. Haigh (secretary), W. H. Barber, Joseph Baxter, George Henry Cotton, Savile Hirst, Walter May, Ephraim Sykes, and James Sykes, with Sam Eastwood co-opted shortly afterwards. By the end of the year, some sympathetic non-trade unionists had also joined, including France Littlewood and Ben Shaw. Garside was the leading figure in the party's organisation, while Gee was its main publicist, writing regularly for the Yorkshire Factory Times in its support.

== Early growth ==
Over the first couple of years, the party worked to establish branches throughout the constituency; by the end of 1892, there were labour clubs in Slaithwaite, Honley, Marsden, Milnsbridge, Golcar and Longwood, which organised social events, and also lectures. While trade unions were generally weak in the area, in Mossley, the cotton industry unions had a substantial membership, and with the support of Mossley Card and Blowing Room Operatives' Association leader Matthew Burrow Farr, the party held a meeting in November 1892 attended by 500 workers. Leonard Hall, organising secretary of the British Labour Amalgamation, was also supportive, and ran a joint recruitment campaign. In addition, the party held public meetings, and approached prominent individuals who it believed might support it.

The party's first electoral contest was the West Riding County Council election of 1892. From five possible candidates, the party selected George Garside, and he won the seat with 55.1% of the vote, defeating the Liberal Godfrey Woodhead. The party agreed to cover Garside's transport costs and loss of wages for attending council meetings. Following this, Tom Quarmby was elected to Linthwaite School Board unopposed, on a platform of providing free books and providing education free of charge, while Pogson and Edwin Hoskins failed to win election to the Slaithwaite School Board.

Mann showed some interest in contesting the Parliamentary seat, attending meetings of the party in August and October 1891, but initially he favoured focusing on trade unionism. He again showed interest early in 1892, after he lost the election to become general secretary of the Amalgamated Society of Engineers, but ultimately he did not stand, probably due to financial concerns. The CVLU sent questionnaires to both candidates in the seat in the 1892 UK general election, but reported that it could not recommend either, and so played no part in the election. Despite this, Mann continued to regularly visit and speak in support of the CVLU, and early in 1893 he finally agreed to stand in the next election.

== General election contests and the ILP ==
The CVLU broadly supported the formation of the national Independent Labour Party (ILP) in 1893, but followed Mann's lead in initially remaining separate. It affiliated in January 1894, naming Mann as its delegate, and successfully nominated him to become the ILP's first general secretary. For the 1894 urban district council elections, except where ILP candidates were standing, the CVLU resolved to support any candidates who supported trade unions and open council meetings. Littlewood won election in Honley, but fourteen other labour candidates were defeated. The 1895 council election was more successful, with Garside holding his seat with 61.4% of the vote, while Farr won the Yorkshire ward in Mossley, and Sanderson Hoyle was only narrowly defeated in the Cheshire ward. This gave the party hope for the 1895 UK general election, but Mann was easily defeated, taking only 13.4% of the vote. Disappointed by the result, he withdrew from his connection with the CVLU, and contested by-elections in other seats he felt were better prospects.

In 1897, the CVLU interviewed five possible successors to Mann as Prospective Parliamentary Candidate: Pete Curran, J. R. Clynes, Bruce Glasier, Leonard Hall and E. J. Sale. Sale was soon removed from contention, replaced by Frank Smith, but by 1899 the party decided not to run any candidate. By then, membership had slumped to only 83 and several branches had ceased functioning, but despite this, the party maintained its positions on the county council and school board, and increased its district council representation.

== Colne Valley Labour League and Victor Grayson ==
The party was reorganised in 1900, becoming the Colne Valley Labour League (CVLL), and its membership again began increasing, particularly once the Labour Party performed well in the 1906 UK general election. By 1907, it had 691 members, and it was determined to stand a candidate in the 1907 Parliamentary by-election. It considered seven possible candidates: Edward Black, Charlie Glyde, Victor Grayson, T. E. Moorhouse, William Pickles, Ben Riley and Russell Williams. Moorhouse was disqualified for having held membership for less than a year, Black and Glyde were deemed unsuitable, and Williams withdrew, preferring to contest Huddersfield. William Crawford Anderson and Ben Turner were added to the list late on. A delegate meeting voted for Anderson and Grayson as its two preferred options, to go forward to a ballot of all members. However, Anderson decided to withdraw, and Grayson was thereby selected. The ILP sent a delegation of J. Howard and Philip Snowden to decide whether to give financial backing to the candidacy; they recommended it do so, but the ILP decided to wait on a decision of the Labour Party's National Executive Committee, and that ultimately decided not to support it. Grayson therefore stood as the candidate of the Colne Valley Labour League, and narrowly won the election on a strongly socialist platform.

Grayson was accepted as part of the Labour Party group in Parliament, but the lack of ILP backing for the election campaign led the CVLL to drift away from the ILP. In 1908, it renamed itself as the Colne Valley Socialist League, emphasising its political principles. The party sponsored Grayson in the Parliamentary seat at the January 1910 UK general election, again without Labour or ILP backing, causing Littlewood to resign, but Grayson was easily beaten, taking third place. The following year, the CVLL followed Grayson in defecting to the new British Socialist Party, but soon fell into dispute with the new organisation and resigned. After a few years of independence, in 1918 it affiliated to the Labour Party, which had decided to establish constituency labour parties. The Colne Valley Socialist League thereby became the Colne Valley Divisional Labour Party.
