= 1907 Colne Valley by-election =

UK parliamentary by-election

← 1906	18 July 1907	Jan. 1910 →

Candidate	Victor Grayson	Philip Bright	Granville Wheler
Party	Independent Labour	Liberal	Conservative
Popular vote	3,648	3,495	3,227
Percentage	35.2%	33.7%	31.1%
MP before election
Sir James Kitson
Liberal
Subsequent MP
Charles Leach
Liberal

The 1907 Colne Valley by-election was a Parliamentary by-election held on 18 July 1907. The constituency returned one Member of Parliament (MP) to the House of Commons of the United Kingdom, elected by the first past the post voting system.

== Vacancy ==
Sir James Kitson had been Liberal MP for the seat of Colne Valley since the 1892 general election. He was created Baron Airedale on 17 July 1907 and resigned to take a seat in the House of Lords.

== Electoral history ==
The seat was re-gained from the Liberal Unionists in 1892:

James Kitson

General election January 1906
Party	Candidate	Votes	%	±%
Liberal	James Kitson	Unopposed	N/A	N/A
Liberal hold				

== Candidates ==
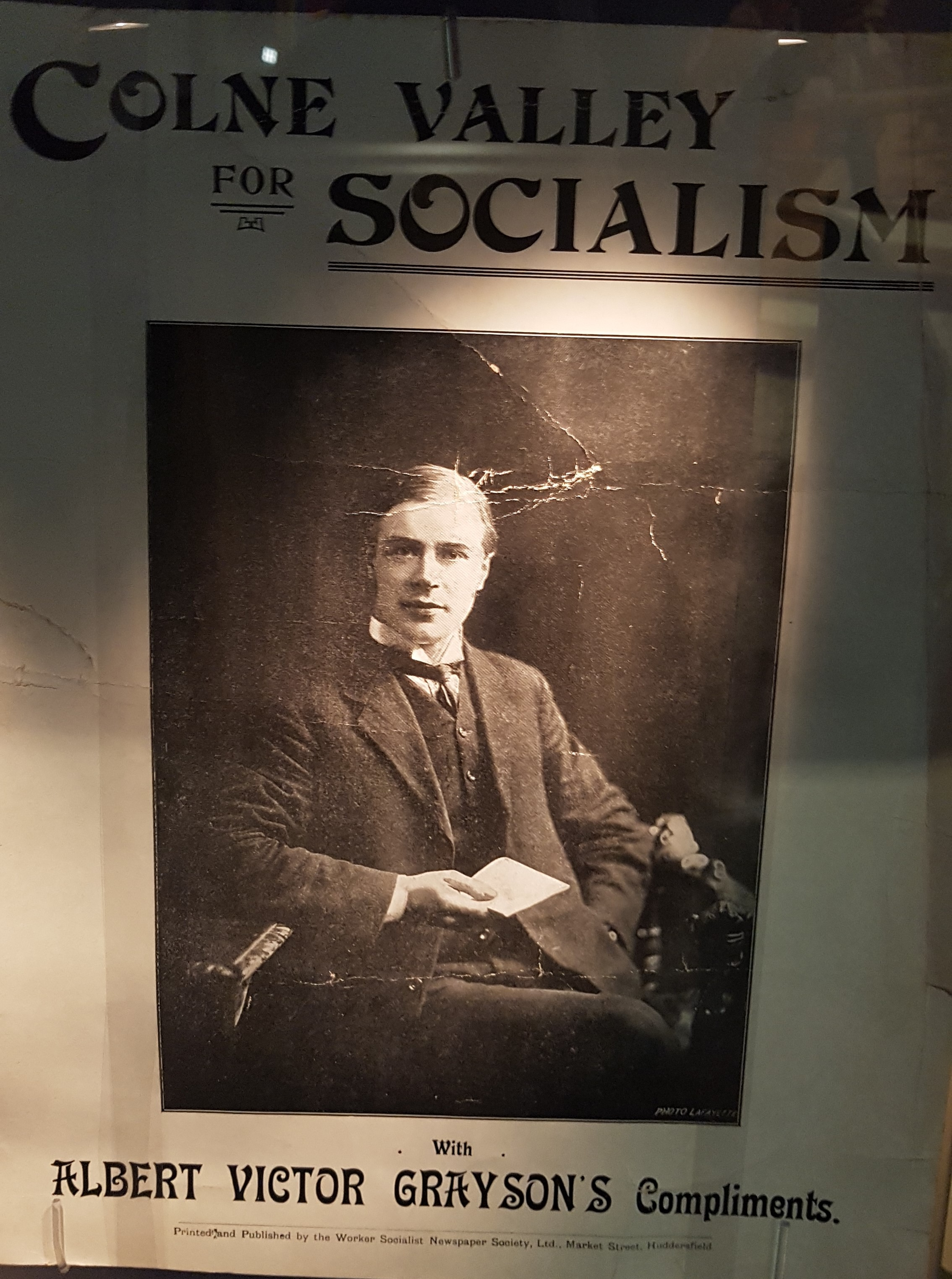
Campaign poster reading "Colne Valley for Socialism."

The local Liberal Association selected Philip Bright to defend the seat. He was the son of John Bright the famous Free-trader. The Conservatives selected 35-year-old barrister, Granville Charles Hastings Wheler, later 1st (and last) Baronet of Otterden, as their candidate. He had contested Osgoldcross at the last general election.

Twenty-six-year-old Victor Grayson stood as an Independent Labour candidate, having been nominated by the Colne Valley Labour League. This was the local branch of the Independent Labour Party (ILP), but the ILP and Labour Party both decided against backing Grayson's candidacy. Grayson was born in Liverpool and became an apprentice engineer. He joined the Independent Labour Party and toured the country giving lectures, becoming a well-known orator despite having a stammer.

Polling Day was fixed for 18 July 1907.

== Result ==
Grayson gained the seat:

Colne Valley by-election, 1907
Party	Candidate	Votes	%	±%
Colne Valley Labour	Victor Grayson	3,648	35.2	New
Liberal	Philip Bright	3,495	33.7	N/A
Conservative	Granville Wheler	3,227	31.1	New
Majority		153	1.5	N/A
Turnout		10,370	88.1	N/A
Independent Labour gain from Liberal		Swing	N/A	

== Aftermath ==
Wheler was elected at Faversham at the next general election. Grayson was defeated by a new Liberal candidate:

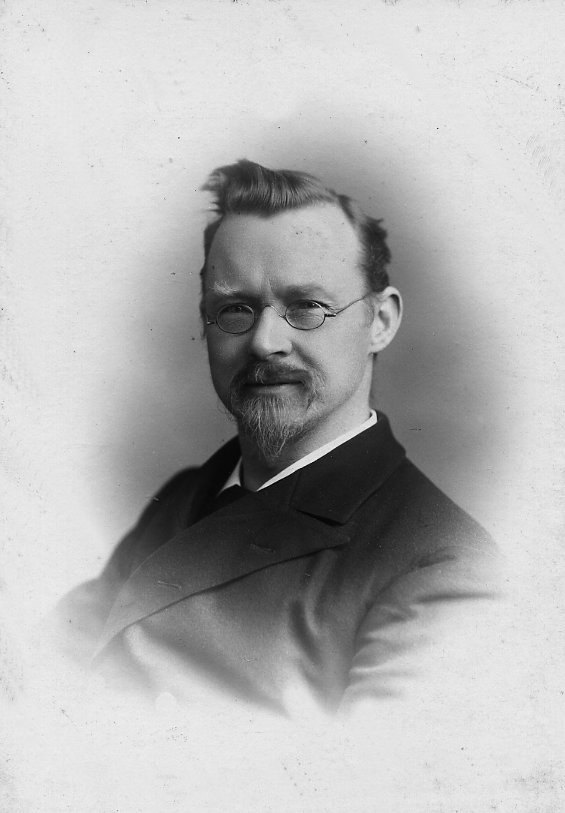
Charles Leach

General election January 1910
Party	Candidate	Votes	%	±%
Liberal	Charles Leach	4,741	40.7	+7.0
Conservative	Archibald Boyd-Carpenter	3,750	32.2	+1.1
Colne Valley Labour	Victor Grayson	3,149	27.1	−8.1
Majority		991	8.5	N/A
Turnout		11,640	93.2	+5.1
Liberal gain from Independent Labour		Swing	+7.6	
