= Harry Brockhouse =

British politician

Henry Brockhouse (11 July 1868 – 21 February 1921) was a British socialist politician.

Born in West Bromwich, Brockhouse's father was the owner of J. Brockhouse & Company, which made axles. Harry became a pupil teacher at the West Bromwich Board School, then qualified as a schoolteacher. However, by 1911, he was the company secretary for his father's firm. He later took up an important position at Vickers.

In his youth, Brockhouse was a supporter of the Liberal Party, and was a prominent local nonconformist. He became interested in Georgism, and founded a local Democratic Club to promote the principle, then when he was twenty-seven, he heard a talk by Caroline Martyn which convinced him to become a socialist. He joined the Independent Labour Party (ILP), and served for many years as president of its West Bromwich branch. He proposed the formation of district councils and federations within the party. This was approved, and by 1906, Brockhouse was president of the party's South Staffordshire Federation. That year, he was elected to the ILP's National Administrative Committee, serving for three years as the representative of its Midlands Division. From 1903, he also served as chair of the party's Divisional Council.

Brockhouse's married Amy Brocklehurst, who was active in the Women's Social and Political Union. When the United Kingdom census, 1911 was conducted, she made herself absent from the house, along with their eldest daughter, Doreen, in accordance with the WSPU policy to boycott the census. Harry himself was active in the Men's League for Women's Suffrage. For many years, Brockhouse was a strong supporter of the Clarion movement. Along with the majority of the ILP, he opposed World War I, and therefore cut his ties with the Clarion.

Brockhouse also served on West Bromwich Town Council for many years, founded the West Bromwich Labour Church, and was president of the national Labour Church Union in 1907.

Party political offices
Preceded by New position	Midlands Division representative on the National Administrative Council of the Independent Labour Party; 1906–1909	Succeeded by Leonard Hall
