= Ben Shaw (Labour activist) =

British labour movement activist

Benjamin Howard Shaw (27 July 1865 – 27 October 1942) was a British labour movement activist.

Shaw was born in Longwood, Huddersfield, and his father owned the nearby Spring Gardens Mill, where cotton was spun. Shaw left school at the age of fourteen to work for his father's business. However, Shaw wished to further his education, and four years later was permitted to attend Huddersfield Technical College, where he became interested in the writings of John Ruskin. He returned to the mill a year later, his interest in Ruskin leading him to read William Morris' writings and become a socialist. In 1892, he joined the Colne Valley Labour Union, and subsequently became an early member of the Independent Labour Party (ILP). In 1893, he was a founder of a Labour Church in his village, and he became its secretary.

Shaw's socialist activism brought him into conflict with his father. As a result, he readily accepted an offer from Keir Hardie to move to Glasgow early in 1894 and work on the Labour Leader, the ILP's newspaper. While Shaw occasionally wrote for the paper, he principally took a managerial role. He also launched the short-lived Glasgow Commonweal newspaper in 1896, and through the newspaper he met and married Joanna Bruce in 1900.

Now married, Shaw remained in Glasgow when the printing of the Labour Leader was moved elsewhere, and he instead found work with the Civic Press. He remained active in the ILP, serving as secretary of its Glasgow branch from 1903 to 1906, and standing unsuccessfully for the Townhead ward in 1905. In his spare time he was active in the temperance movement, and also in the Shop Assistants' Union, representing it on occasion to the Scottish Trades Union Congress (STUC). In 1909, he was vice-chair of the STUC, and soon afterwards he became head of the insurance department of the Scottish Horse and Motormen's Union.

In 1911, the Labour Party decided for the first time to form a single branch for the whole of Glasgow, and Shaw became its secretary. However, the merger provoked numerous conflicts between different socialist groups, and Shaw stood down in 1914, to become secretary of the party's new Scottish Advisory Council. Joanna died in 1916, and Shaw then met Clarice McNab, the two marrying in 1918.

As secretary of the Scottish Council, Shaw initially focused on supporting the broader labour movement through World War I, while probably being personally opposed to the conflict. He strongly supported John Maclean when he was gaoled for his part in the events of Red Clydeside, but he subsequently became a firm opponent of the Communist Party of Great Britain, notably by manoeuvering to ensure that the communist Walton Newbold was not re-selected as the Labour candidate in Motherwell.

In 1932, Shaw retired from active politics, and he resigned from the ILP later in the year, when it disaffiliated from the Labour Party. He spent his retirement supporting McNab's political career, until he died suddenly in 1942.
