= Tom Fox (British politician) =

British politician

Tom Fox (1860 – 10 August 1934) was a British Labour Party politician.

Born to a Catholic family in Stalybridge, Fox worked half-time in a cotton mill from an early age, while attending St Peter's School. He studied at the mechanics institute in his spare time, before leaving the mill due to poor health and working as a shop assistant. In about 1875, he joined the King's Liverpool Regiment, serving in India and then fighting in the Third Anglo-Burmese War, where he became a sergeant and was nearly killed. He subsequently retired from the Army and became a labourer.

He worked with Leonard Hall to form the Manchester Ship Canal Navvies Union in 1888; this became the British Labour Amalgamation, and Fox succeeded Hall as its General Secretary in 1897. He increased the union's membership, to nearly 5,000 by 1913, before leading it in a merger with the National Union of General Workers in 1917. He also served as Secretary, and later as president, of the Manchester Trades and Labour Council.

Fox was an early activist for the Labour Representation Committee (LRC), and was one of its first local election candidates, in 1902. Although he did not win on that occasion, he was elected to Manchester City Council in 1904, and remained on the council for many years, becoming an Alderman in 1919, and serving as the first Labour Lord Mayor of Manchester, in 1919/20.

Fox was a member of the National Executive Committee of the LRC and its successor, the Labour Party, for many years prior to World War I, and he served as Chair of the Labour Party in 1913/14. He used the opportunity to push the party to adopt more efficient methods of organisation, learning from the Social Democratic Party of Germany.

Trade union offices
Preceded by Leonard Hall	General Secretary of the British Labour Amalgamation; 1897–1917	Succeeded by Position abolished
Preceded by George Davy Kelley	Secretary of the Manchester Trades and Labour Council; 1906 – 1909	Succeeded by William R. Mellor
Party political offices
Preceded by William Barefoot	Trades councils representative on the National Executive Committee of the Labour Party; 1910–1914	Succeeded by Egerton P. Wake
Preceded by George Henry Roberts	Chair of the Labour Party; 1913–1914	Succeeded by William Crawford Anderson
Civic offices
Preceded by William Kay	Lord Mayor of Manchester; 1919–1920	Succeeded by William Kay
