= Graham Riddick =

British politician

Graham Edward Galloway Riddick (born 26 August 1955, Long Preston, West Riding of Yorkshire) was the Conservative Party member of parliament (MP) for Colne Valley in West Yorkshire, England from 1987 to 1997.

== Family and early life ==
His father ran the family's cotton mill in Nelson, Lancashire until its closure in the early 1960s. Riddick's maternal grandfather, Edward Ruggles-Brise was Conservative MP for Maldon, Essex from 1922 to 1942.

Riddick was educated at Stowe School and, for one year only, University of Warwick; he is married with three children. Before he became an MP, Riddick worked for 10 years in various sales management roles with Procter & Gamble (1977–82) and Coca-Cola Schweppes Beverages (1982–87).

He won his seat in Parliament at the 1987 election becoming the first ever Conservative MP in Colne Valley's 102 year-history. He retained it at the 1992 election, increasing his majority from 1,677 in 1987 to 7,224 in 1992.

== Sunday Times allegations ==
In July 1994, a "sting operation" by The Sunday Times implicated Riddick in the "Cash for Questions" affair.

Two reporters from the newspaper posed as people wishing to have questions asked in the House of Commons. Both Riddick and fellow Conservative MP David Tredinnick were accused of accepting cash for asking questions. Riddick initially agreed to work for the journalist but on receiving a cheque from the reporter, he returned it immediately, before he knew that the reporter was working for a newspaper.

When The Sunday Times reported the story Riddick immediately apologised to Parliament but was subsequently found to be in breach of Parliamentary rules and was suspended for 10 days.

== Later career ==
Riddick was Parliamentary Private Secretary to Francis Maude, Financial Secretary to the Treasury between 1990 and 1992. He was also Parliamentary Private Secretary to John MacGregor, Secretary of State for Transport from 1992 until July 1994 when Macgregor left the Cabinet. Riddick served on the Education and Employment Select Committee between 1994 and 1997. He was also a member of the Broadcasting Select Committee and the Deregulation Select Committee between 1995 and 1997.

He contested his seat again at the 1997 general election, but lost to the Labour Party's Kali Mountford, who won with a majority of 4,840.

Parliament of the United Kingdom
Preceded by Richard Wainwright	Member of Parliament for Colne Valley; 1987–1997	Succeeded by Kali Mountford
