= Jason McCartney (politician) =

British politician (born 1968)

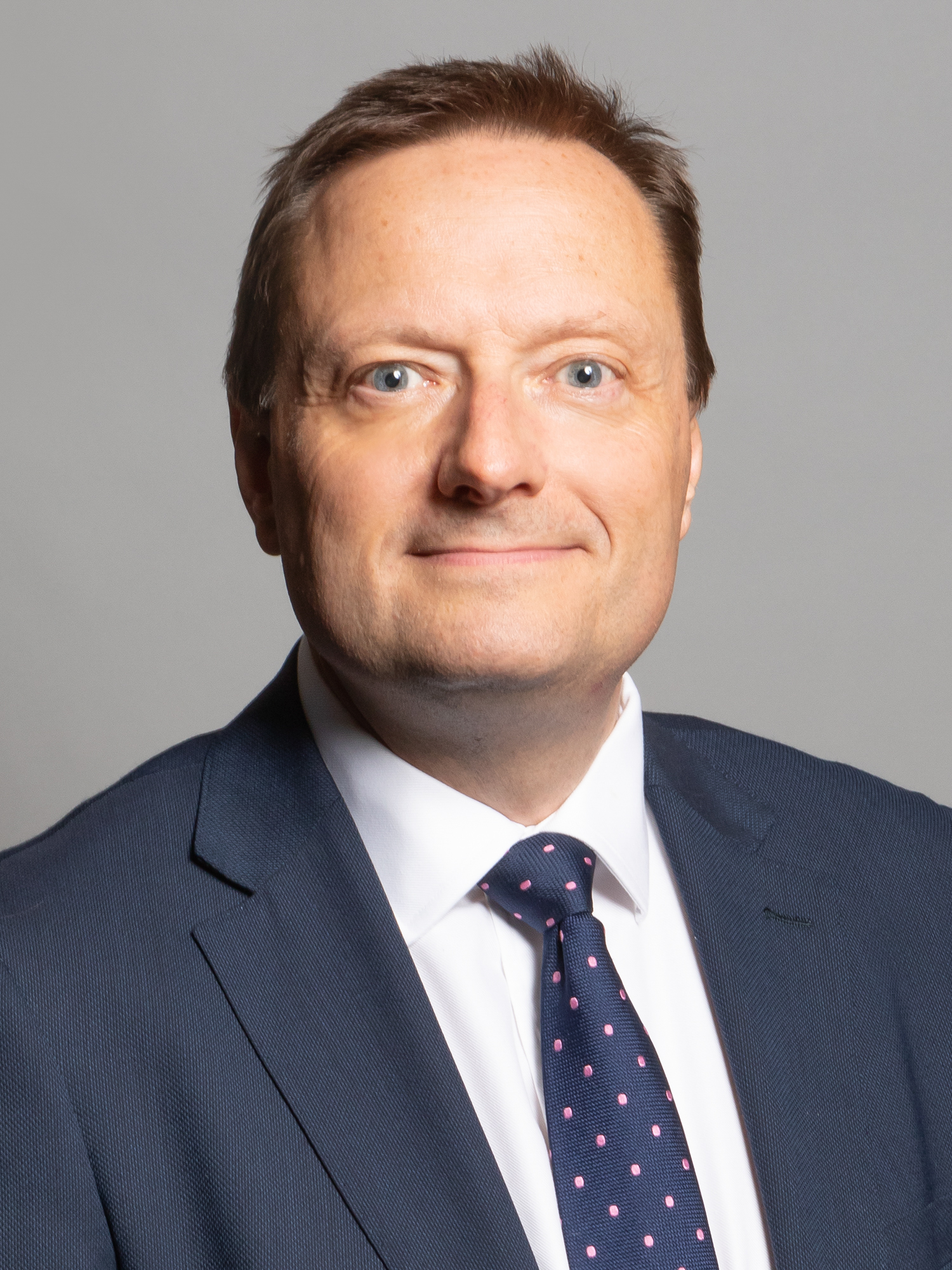
- Official portrait, 2020

Member of Parliament for Colne Valley
- In office 12 December 2019 – 30 May 2024
- Preceded by: Thelma Walker
- Succeeded by: Paul Davies
- In office 6 May 2010 – 3 May 2017
- Preceded by: Kali Mountford
- Succeeded by: Thelma Walker

Personal details
- Born: Jason Alexander McCartney; 29 January 1968 (age 58) Harrogate, West Riding of Yorkshire, England
- Party: Conservative
- Other political affiliations: Liberal Democrats (until 2006)
- Children: 2
- Education: Leeds Trinity & All Saints
- Website: jasonmccartney.com

Military service
- Allegiance: United Kingdom
- Branch/service: Royal Air Force
- Years of service: 1988–1997
- Rank: Flight lieutenant

Jason Alexander McCartney (born 29 January 1968) is a British Conservative Party politician who was the member of Parliament (MP) for Colne Valley in West Yorkshire from 2019 to 2024, and from 2010 to 2017. He is a former TV sports reporter.

== Early life and career ==
McCartney was born on 29 January 1968 in Harrogate, West Riding of Yorkshire, to Wing Commander Robert McCartney and Jean McCartney. He was educated at Lancaster Royal Grammar School and RAF College, Cranwell. McCartney went on to serve as an officer in the Royal Air Force for nine years, fulfilling tours in Las Vegas, Turkey and Iraq. After reaching the rank of Flight Lieutenant, he resigned his commission in 1997. In 2011, he became Honorary President of the Huddersfield Branch of the RAF Association.

After studying for a postgraduate diploma in broadcast journalism at Leeds Trinity & All Saints, McCartney worked as a reporter for BBC Radio Leeds, notably interviewing Northern Ireland Secretary Mo Mowlam in 1997. From 1998 until 2007, he worked as a presenter for ITV Yorkshire, most notably on the regional Calendar news programme.

McCartney unsuccessfully stood as a Liberal Democrat candidate for the Pudsey ward of Leeds City Council in 2006.

From 2008 to 2010, he was a senior lecturer at Leeds Metropolitan University.

== Member of Parliament ==
=== 2010–2017 ===
McCartney changed party affiliation, and was selected as the Conservative prospective parliamentary candidate for Colne Valley in March 2007. McCartney stood in the 2010 general election, taking the Colne Valley seat with a majority of 4,837 and replacing Labour's incumbent Kali Mountford. He gave his maiden speech on 17 June 2010 in a debate on the economy, expressing his support for local rural Post Offices.

In November 2010, William Hague appointed McCartney to the NATO Parliamentary Assembly UK Delegation. McCartney served on the Transport Select Committee from 10 June 2013 to 30 March 2015. He was also a member of the 1922 Committee's Executive Committee from 2013 to 2017.

He was one of the few Conservative Members of Parliament who voted against an increase to the cap on university tuition fees and supported the need for a referendum on the EU. McCartney holds strong views on welfare, and consistently voted to reduce housing benefit, and generally voted against raising welfare benefits in line with prices. In the run up to the 2015 general election, McCartney took the unusual step of replying to a constituent who disagreed with the Coalition's austerity plan with a letter recommending they backed the Green Party candidate instead. McCartney told the constituent he respected their differences of opinion but the Green Party candidate was "the only candidate who matches what you believe". Labour accused him of trying to split the left wing vote, whilst McCartney said he often put constituents in touch with political rivals if he believed it could help.

McCartney supported Brexit in the 2016 European Union membership referendum. He voted to reject an amendment to the Brexit bill which demanded an analysis of the impact of exiting the EU on the NHS.

McCartney was defeated by the Labour Party candidate, Thelma Walker, in the 2017 general election. After the loss he revealed that the prime minister, Theresa May, had contacted him to apologise and accept responsibility for his defeat.

=== 2019–2024 ===
McCartney returned to Parliament in the 2019 general election, winning back Colne Valley with a majority of 5,103. In May 2020, McCartney called for the resignation of Government Chief Advisor Dominic Cummings.

In October 2020, McCartney was one of five Conservative MPs who broke the whip to vote for a Labour opposition day motion to extend the provision of free school meals during school holidays until Easter 2021.

On 13 June 2022, McCartney was appointed Parliamentary Private Secretary to the Attorney General's Office.

== Outside Parliament ==
From 2017 to 2019, McCartney was Head of Public Affairs at Huddersfield University. In 2018, he became a director of fairandfunky, a community interest company in Yorkshire. He was a member of the One Community Foundation Trust from 2017 to 2019, and on the board of the Mid Yorkshire Chamber of Commerce from 2018 to 2019.

== Personal life ==
McCartney lives in Honley, West Yorkshire, and has two children. He is a member of the Royal Air Force Club, and lists his recreations as "Huddersfield Town AFC, Huddersfield Giants RLFC, Yorkshire CCC, tennis".

Parliament of the United Kingdom
| Preceded by Kali Mountford | Member of Parliament for Colne Valley; 2010–2017 | Succeeded by Thelma Walker |
| Preceded by Thelma Walker | Member of Parliament for Colne Valley; 2019–2024 | Succeeded by Paul Davies |
