= Frederick Mallalieu =

British politician

Member of Parliament for Colne Valley
- In office 25 August 1916 – 15 November 1922
- Preceded by: Charles Leach
- Succeeded by: Philip Snowden

Personal details
- Born: 1860
- Died: 10 May 1932 (aged 71–72)
- Children: Lance and William

Frederick William Mallalieu (1860 – 10 May 1932) was a Liberal Party politician in the United Kingdom.

Son of woollen manufacturer and ironworks company chairman Henry Mallalieu (1831–1902), J.P., of Delph Lodge, Delph, Saddleworth, near Oldham, (now Greater Manchester, then in the West Riding of Yorkshire) Mallalieu was educated at Huddersfield College, Henry Mallalieu was of humble origins, one of nineteen children of weaver Joseph Mallalieu, and descended from Huguenots that settled at Saddleworth in the early 1600s; at the age of twelve Henry worked as a hand-loom weaver. Frederick's brother, Albert Henry Mallalieu, was head of that family of Tan-y-Marian, Llandudno.

Mallalieu was elected as the member of parliament (MP) for Colne Valley at a by-election in 1916. He was re-elected as a Coalition Liberal at the 1918 general election, when because of his support for Lloyd George's Coalition Government, the Conservative Party did not field a candidate.

However, a Conservative candidate did stand at the 1922 general election, and Mallalieu was reduced to third place, losing his seat to the Labour Party's Philip Snowden. His share of the vote had fallen from 58.8% in 1918 to only 25.1% in 1922.

Mallalieu did not stand for Parliament again, and died in 1932, aged 71.

He married, in 1902, Ann, daughter of Joseph Hardman; two of their sons were elected to the House of Commons:

- Lance (born 1905) was Liberal MP for Colne Valley from 1931 to 1935, then Labour MP for Brigg from 1948 to 1974
- William (born 1908) was Labour MP for Huddersfield from 1945 to 1950, then for Huddersfield East from 1950 to 1979.

Sir William Mallalieu's daughter Ann has been a Labour life peer since 1991.

== Arms ==
Coat of arms of Frederick Mallalieu
Notes Granted in 1920. Escutcheon Azure on a chevron Ermine between three fleurs-de-lis Argent four bezants on a chief Ermines a rose of the third barbed and seeded Proper. Motto Mal A Lui Qui Mal En Dit (Evil To Him Who Speaks Evil) Symbolism Fleurs-de-lis refer to Huguenot ancestry, motto cants on family name.

== Notes ==
Parliament of the United Kingdom
Preceded by Charles Leach	Member of Parliament for Colne Valley; 1916–1922	Succeeded by Philip Snowden
