= Richard Wainwright (politician) =

British politician (1918–2003)

Chairman of the Liberal Party
- In office 1970–1972
- Preceded by: Desmond Banks
- Succeeded by: Cyril Carr

Member of Parliament for Colne Valley
- In office 28 February 1974 – 18 May 1987
- Preceded by: David Clark
- Succeeded by: Graham Riddick
- In office 31 March 1966 – 29 May 1970
- Preceded by: Patrick Duffy
- Succeeded by: David Clark

Personal details
- Born: Richard Scurrah Wainwright; 11 April 1918 Leeds, England
- Died: 16 January 2003 (aged 84) Leeds, England
- Party: Liberal (before 1988); Liberal Democrats (after 1988)
- Spouse: Joyce Hollis (m. 1948)
- Children: 4, including Martin and Hilary
- Education: Shrewsbury School; Clare College, Cambridge (BA)

Richard Scurrah Wainwright (11 April 1918 – 16 January 2003) was a British politician of the Liberal Party. He was the MP for Colne Valley from 1966 to 1970, and again from 1974 to 1987.

== Early life and education ==
Wainwright was born in Leeds. He was educated at Shrewsbury School He then won an open scholarship to Clare College, Cambridge (BA History, 1938). While studying for his degree he developed his interest in the Liberal Party, as a member of the Cambridge University Liberal Club.

== Early career ==
After leaving university he became a Merchant Banker, but later left the profession to focus on his political aspirations. During World War II, he registered as a conscientious objector and joined the Friends' Ambulance Unit, a Quaker organisation, serving in Normandy in 1944, and Antwerp the Netherlands and Germany in 1944–46.

== Parliamentary career ==
Wainwright stood as the Liberal Party candidate for the constituency of Pudsey in the general election of 1950 and again in 1955, but was unsuccessful on both occasions. In 1956 he became the Liberal candidate for Colne Valley. Standing there as a Liberal in 1959, the 1963 by-election, and 1964, he increased his vote each time until he finally gained the seat in 1966. At the following election in 1970 he was defeated by the Labour Party's David Clark but regained the seat at the February 1974 election. He retained his seat until his retirement at the 1987 general election.

In 1953, Wainwright was elected to the executive of the Liberal Party and served as its Chairman between 1970 and 1972. His particular areas of interest were employment, trade and public finance. From 1961 he concentrated his work at Liberal headquarters on local government. He was a central spokesman for the Liberal Party on finance and represented his party on the Finance Bill Committee in 1968, trade and industry, the economy (1966–1970, 1979–1985) and employment (1985–1987). He was the chairman of the Liberal Party Research Department (1968–1970). After 1974 Wainwright focused on the financial management of the party.

== Outside Parliament ==
After 1987, although retired as an MP, Wainwright continued to be politically active, working for the Electoral Reform Society, as well as being a founding member of the executive committee of Charter 88. Between 1986 and 1997 he was also Deputy Chairman of the Wider Share Ownership Council. When the Liberal Party merged with the Social Democratic Party to become the Liberal Democrats, Wainwright became a member working as President of the Yorkshire Federation of Liberal Democrats (1989–1997).

Wainwright was a Methodist lay preacher. Between 1948 and 1958, he served on the Leeds Group B Hospital Management Committee and was Chairman of the Arthington Hospital and Thorp Arch Hospital Committees. He served on the Committee for the Leeds, Skyrac and Morley Savings Bank Board of Managers and the Leeds Library Committee. Further roles included Treasurer of the Leeds Invalid Children's Aid Society and the Bethany House Free Church Probation Home. Between 1959 and 1984, he was a member of the Joseph Rowntree Social Services Trust Limited (now the Joseph Rowntree Reform Trust). He was also made a Fellow of the Huddersfield Polytechnic (later the University of Huddersfield) in 1988.

== Personal life ==
His wife Joyce (née Hollis; died 4 February 2011), whom he married in 1948, was an active member of the Yorkshire Women's Liberal Federation, fulfilling roles as both Chairman and President, and Chairman of the Colne Valley Women's Liberal Council (1959–1987). She was also a member of the Executive of the national Women's Liberal Federation. The couple had four children, two of whom entered public life: their son Martin is a former Northern Editor of The Guardian newspaper, and their daughter Hilary is a radical academic and editor of Red Pepper magazine.

Wainwright died in Leeds on 16 January 2003, aged 84. The former offices of Greg Mulholland, who was Liberal Democrat MP for Leeds North West from 2005 to 2017, were named 'Richard Wainwright House' in his honour.

Parliament of the United Kingdom
Preceded by Patrick Duffy	Member of Parliament for Colne Valley; 1966–1970	Succeeded by David Clark
Preceded by David Clark	Member of Parliament for Colne Valley; Feb 1974–1987	Succeeded by Graham Riddick
Party political offices
Preceded by Desmond Banks	Chairman of the Liberal Party; 1970–1972	Succeeded by Cyril Carr
