= Kali Mountford =

British politician

Member of Parliament for Colne Valley
- In office 2 May 1997 – 12 April 2010
- Preceded by: Graham Riddick
- Succeeded by: Jason McCartney

Personal details
- Born: 12 January 1954 (age 72) Crewe, Cheshire, England
- Party: Labour
- Spouse: Ian Leedham (m. 1995)
- Children: 2
- Education: Manchester Metropolitan University
- Profession: Civil servant, politician

Carol Jean Mountford (née Newton; born 12 January 1954) is a British former Labour Party politician who served as the Member of Parliament (MP) for Colne Valley from 1997 until she retired from the House of Commons at the 2010 general election.

== Early life ==
Mountford was born in Crewe, the daughter of an engine driver. She attended Crewe Grammar School for Girls. At Crewe and Alsager College (now the Alsager Campus of Manchester Metropolitan University), she obtained a DipHE and a BA in Philosophy, Psychology and Sociology in 1988 as a mature student. Mountford worked as a civil servant benefits clerk for ten years, then as a researcher and training officer for a further 10 years before entering Parliament. She was active in the CPSA (which became the PCS in 1998), with joint membership of the IPCS (Institute of Professional and Civil Servants) as a regional and national officer.

== Political career ==
In 1986, whilst working at the Crewe Jobcentre, Mountford stood as the Liberal Party candidate in a Cheshire County Council by-election in Crewe Central ward on 18 September. From 1992 to 1996 she was a Labour Party member of Sheffield City Council, representing Hillsborough ward.

Mountford was selected as a Labour candidate through an all-women shortlist. She was first elected at the 1997 general election for Colne Valley and served as Parliamentary Private Secretary to Des Browne MP.

She retired from the Commons at the 2010 general election. The Colne Valley seat was then won by the Conservative Party candidate, Jason McCartney. Although Labour fell to third place that election, they would regain the seat seven years later.

Mountford contested the Colne Valley East ward in the 2026 Kirklees Local Elections, losing to the Reform UK candidates.

== Controversies ==
Mountford was suspended from the House of Commons for five working days in 1998 for leaking a Social Security Select Committee report to the government. The House of Commons Standards and Privileges Committee stated that although there were some mitigating circumstances for her behaviour, she had in fact "aggravated her original offence by denying responsibility". In addition to the suspension Mountford was forced to apologise for her conduct.

As a result of the controversy Mountford also resigned from the Social Security Select Committee.

== Personal life ==
Mountford married her third husband Ian Leedham in July 1995 in Sheffield; she has a son and daughter.

Parliament of the United Kingdom
Preceded by Graham Riddick	Member of Parliament for Colne Valley; 1997 – 2010	Succeeded by Jason McCartney
