= Helen Pidd =

British journalist (born 1977)

- Born: 1981 (age 44–45); Hest Bank, Lancashire
- Education: University of Edinburgh
- Occupation: Journalist
- Employer: The Guardian
- Website: www.theguardian.com/profile/helenpidd

Helen Pidd (born 1981) is a British journalist who hosts the Guardian’s Today In Focus podcast. She was previously a news writer for The Guardian, succeeding Martin Wainwright as the paper's Northern Editor, based in Manchester, in spring 2013.

== Early life and education ==
Pidd was born in Hest Bank in Lancaster and went to school in nearby Morecambe. She studied German at the University of Edinburgh before joining The Guardian. While at the university she regularly contributed to The Student newspaper.

== Career ==
In 2002, Pidd co-founded Fest Magazine, an alternative Edinburgh Festival magazine, and that same year was also a runner-up in The Guardian media awards best feature writer section.

She began freelancing for The Guardian before her graduation in 2004. Since joining the paper's staff, she has been the Berlin correspondent and worked briefly in Delhi before moving to Manchester in 2013. She is also the author of Bicycle – Love Your Bike: the Complete Guide to Everyday Cycling.

=== Awards and honours ===
While at university, Pidd won Student Journalist of the Year 2002 in The Glasgow Herald's media awards.
