= Catalyst (think tank) =

UK think tank

Catalyst (later Catalyst Forum) was a left wing independent think tank based in London, set up in 1998 to promote policies directed to the redistribution of power, wealth and opportunity. Though not aligned to any political party, it was generally sympathetic to the Labour movement and described itself as "an organisation of the left".

The organisation was founded at the high point of Tony Blair's modernisation of the Labour Party and struggled to attract funding, especially from the trades unions who had originally been expected to be the most sympathetic to its redistributionist platform. Trades unions, concerned at further exclusion from power either by the electorate or the new Labour Party leadership, took a sharp turn away from too deep an association with the Left at this time and only begun in 2005 and 2006 to develop an increased if cautious interest in left-wing thought as a new generation of activist trades union leaders has emerged.

Former Deputy Labour Leader, Roy Hattersley, who was on the (centre-left) Labour Party's right-wing, but egalitarian, was an early supporter, as was John Edmonds, General Secretary of the GMB Union

However, Catalyst was never a political or campaigning organisation and restricted itself to public policy work on redistribution and looking at soft areas like identity politics and public administration that were often neglected on the Left in favour of economics and social policy. It was never associated with the so-called Hard Left.

Catalyst's first director was former Director of Policy at the Labour Party, Roland Wales, who was followed by Barbara Gunnell, Martin McIvor, and Jenny Smith. Its founding board of management included: Marjorie Thompson, Mark Seddon, Mike Watts, Nyta Mann, Pat Coyne, Tim Pendry, Hilary Wainwright, and Richard Stone. It had a prestigious Advisory Board. Lack of funds did not stop it from putting out a series of pamphlets, some of which proved contentious. For example, Simon Partridge authored one with a revisionist view of nationalism which was avowedly "left-Burkean". The organisation adopted creatively low-cost ways of making itself known. Its annual reception became a high point for centre-left political exiles from the Labour Movement to meet and catch up.

It not only survived the modernisation period but re-emerged strengthened in later years with a new generation of academics and intellectuals prepared to develop alternative democratic socialist policies. In 2003 Catalyst won the "One To Watch" category at Prospect magazine's annual Think Tank Awards. In 2006 it merged with the Compass organisation.

== See also ==
- List of UK think tanks
