= Paul Davies (Labour politician) =

British politician (born 1957)

Paul Davies MP
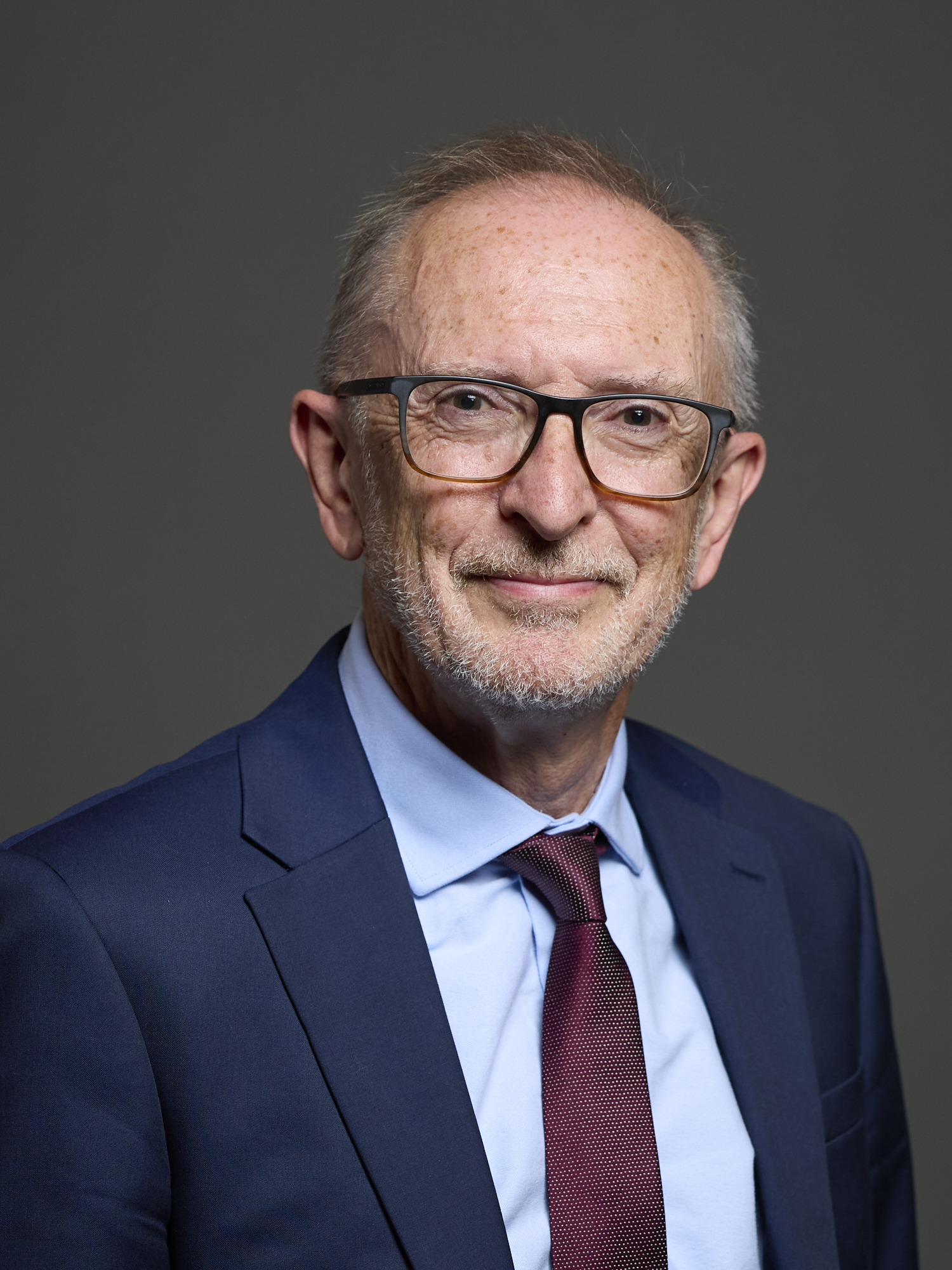
- Official portrait, 2024

Member of Parliament for Colne Valley
- Incumbent
- Assumed office 4 July 2024
- Preceded by: Jason McCartney
- Majority: 4,963 (10.7%)

Personal details
- Born: October 1957 (age 69)
- Party: Labour
- Spouse: Leah Davies
- Education: Cardiff University (BS)
- Website: pauldavies.uk

Paul Davies (born October 1957) is a British politician. A member of the Labour Party, he has been the Member of Parliament for Colne Valley since 2024.

== Early life and career ==
Davies was born in October 1957. He grew up in Caerau, Bridgend. At age 16, he left school and became an electrician for coal mines, with him joining and later becoming a representative of the National Union of Mineworkers in South Wales.

Davies studied Politics and Economic History at Cardiff University, earning a Bachelor of Science. After graduation, he worked in roles in human resources and operations management. He eventually joined the public sector as a primary school teacher, though was diagnosed with colorectal cancer after two years of teaching.

After recovering from cancer, Davies was elected as a councillor in 2019 for Holme Valley South ward on Kirklees Council. He was the deputy leader of the council before he stepped down in 2024, when selected as the Labour parliamentary candidate for Colne Valley.

== Parliamentary career ==
Davies was selected as the candidate for Labour Party in Colne Valley in December 2022. He won the seat with 41% of the vote and unseated the Conservative's Jason McCartney with a majority of 4,963. There were a total of six candidates, and a turnout of 64%. He was noted for his advanced age when first elected, being 66 at the time.

Davies is a member of the Commons Committees on Finance, and on Petitions. He is chairman of the all-party parliamentary group on tackling loneliness and connecting communities, and the group on carbon monoxide.

In November 2024, Davies voted in favour of the Terminally Ill Adults (End of Life) Bill, which proposes to legalise assisted suicide. He was critical of Keir Starmer and his leadership, with him calling for him to resign.

== Personal life ==
Davies is married to Leah Davies.
