= Lunacy (Vacating of Seats) Act 1886 =

Act of the Parliament of the United Kingdom

Lunacy (Vacating of Seats) Act 1886 (Note: Section 1.)
- Act of Parliament
- Parliament of the United Kingdom
- Long title: An Act to amend the Law in regard to the Vacating of Seats in the House of Commons.
- Citation: 49 & 50 Vict. c. 16
- Introduced by: Sir Charles Cameron, 1st Baronet (Commons)
- Territorial extent: United Kingdom

Dates
- Royal assent: 10 May 1886
- Commencement: 10 May 1886 (Note: Section 2.)
- Repealed: 1 November 1960
Other legislation
Repealed by	Mental Health Act 1959

Status: Repealed

Text of statute as originally enacted

The Lunacy (Vacating of Seats) Act 1886 (49 & 50 Vict. c. 16) was an act of the Parliament of the United Kingdom. It provided a mechanism for a Member of Parliament who was judged to be of unsound mind to be removed from his seat.

== Background ==
There had been a number of cases of Members of Parliament who were felt, in the language of the time, to be lunatics. The most celebrated of these was John Bell the MP for Thirsk who in July 1849 was found to be insane by a commission of enquiry. It was then discovered that there was no way of depriving him of his seat and he remained a Member until his death in 1851.

In January 1886 Charles Cameron (later Sir Charles), known in the House of Commons as Dr Cameron, introduced the Lunacy (Vacating of Seats) Bill to deal with the problem. His determination was such that despite being a private members bill it went through all its parliamentary stages with little opposition, in less than five months and received its royal assent on 10 May 1886, hence becoming the Lunacy (Vacating of Seats) Act 1886.

== Provisions ==
The act was very short, barely more than a page long; and containing only three paragraphs.

It states what should happen if any member of the House of Commons should be committed to a lunatic asylum:

All those involved with the committal must send a report to the Speaker of the House of Commons or face a fine.

The Speaker should send the reports to the Commissioners in Lunacy and that two of them should visit the member and report to the Speaker. If the report is that he is of unsound mind then after six months the Speaker should request a further visit. If this second visit shows that the member is still of unsound mind then the reports are placed on the table in the House of Commons and at that point the seat of the member is declared vacant, and a byelection is called for his replacement.

== Consequences ==
In practice there was a reluctance to call on the act and it was only used once in the rather special circumstances of the First World War. An election was overdue and during the hostilities it was impossible to hold one. In August 1916, in these circumstances, Charles Leach the MP for Colne Valley was declared of unsound mind and relieved of his seat.

== Subsequent developments ==
The whole act was repealed by section 149(2) of, and part I of the eighth schedule to, Mental Health Act 1959 (7 & 8 Eliz. 2. c. 72), which came into force on 1 November 1960. The Mental Health Act 1959 was itself repealed and replaced by the Mental Health Act 1983. The section was subsequently repealed by the Mental Health (Discrimination) Act 2013.
