= Charles Leach =

British politician (1847–1919)

Rev Dr Charles Leach
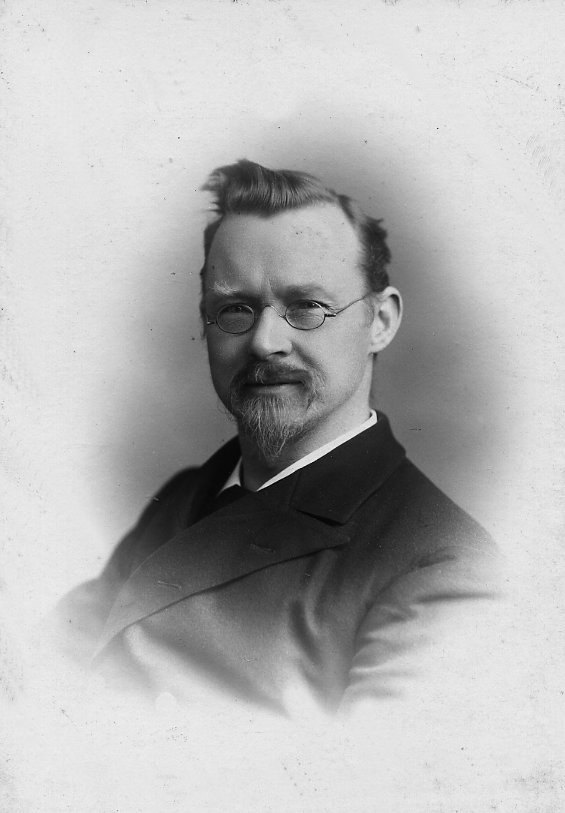
- Charles Leach

Member of Parliament for Colne Valley
- In office 1910–1916
- Preceded by: Victor Grayson
- Succeeded by: Frederick Mallalieu

Personal details
- Born: 1 March 1847 Illingworth, Halifax, Yorkshire, England
- Died: 24 November 1919 (aged 72) England
- Occupation: Shoemaker, Congregational Minister, and politician
- Known for: Only MP to lose his seat for being of unsound mind

Charles Leach (1 March 1847 – 24 November 1919) was a Congregationalist Minister and Liberal Party politician in the United Kingdom. He is notable as the only Member of Parliament to be deprived of his seat after being declared of unsound mind.

== Early life ==
Leach was born in Illingworth, near Halifax, but moved to the town and grew up in a slum called Ratten Row, where his mother died when he was five. He entered a worsted mill at eight which meant that he also had three hours elementary schooling per day. At fourteen he became apprenticed as a clog and patten maker and then trained as a shoe and bootmaker. At nineteen he set up in that trade and on the strength of that married Mary Jane Fox. Moving to Elland near Halifax he built up a successful boot and shoe business, by 1871 employing three men, one woman and two boys.

== Religious training ==
In Halifax he had become involved with the Methodist New Connexion Church and in Elland became a local preacher for them. Feeling a call to enter the ministry he worked from four to eight in the morning before opening his shop to reach the required educational level. In 1873 the denomination sent him to Sheffield as a 'preacher on trial', with responsibility for Attercliffe chapel, but meanwhile he attended Ranmoor Theological College in the city. After two years in Sheffield, he was sent to the Ladywood mission chapel in Birmingham.

== Professional life ==
In Birmingham he began his Sunday afternoon lectures which were so popular that after a couple of years he was forced to use the Town Hall as the numbers had become so great. They were at time said to have reached 4000 people. He was ordained into the Methodist New Connexion in 1877. After four years at Ladywood the Methodist New Connexion wanted to send him to London, but a committee was set up to use the redundant Highbury chapel in Graham Street and he was invited to be the pastor and hence he became an Independent or Congregational minister. He ran a very successful chapel for seven years and also became a regular speaker for, and officer in, the Liberal party. In 1884 he was elected to the Birmingham School Board. However, in 1886, when Joseph Chamberlain split the party he sided with Gladstone which left him in a difficult position in Liberal Unionist dominated Birmingham.

The upshot was that he left and went to Queen's Park in London, to a church that was still meeting in a hall. In the next few years he raised all the money and got the proper chapel built. In 1888, Leach, who was living in Brondesbury Road, Kilburn, stood as a Progressive candidate in Chelsea division for the London School Board. He placed ninth, where there were five seats available. In 1889 he went on a preaching tour to Canada and America where he collected an honorary Doctorate of Divinity from Ohio University. Always interested in education he was instrumental in setting up the Queen's Park Institute which used the chapel's school buildings. In 1892 he was elected to Chelsea Vestry. By 1894 he was despairing of the Liberal Party and joined Keir Hardie's recently founded Independent Labour Party. In 1894 after the new act, everyone had to be re-elected to the Vestry and he stood under his new colours. This was too much for his chapel and he was forced to resign and withdraw before the poll.

In 1897 he received a call to go to Cavendish Street where there was a huge chapel just off Oxford Road in Manchester. Here they wanted him because they were seeing declining numbers as their congregation moved to the suburbs. He had built a reputation as being able to attract members of the working classes to his services. In Manchester he was much involved with Passive Resistance, the movement protesting about the Education Act 1902 and the requirement for ratepayers to support Anglican and Catholic schools. By 1904 it had all become too much for him and he resigned and took up what he thought would be a less onerous pastorate at Harecourt Chapel, in Islington, London. Here he remained until early 1908.

As an adjunct to his work within the temperance movement he was one of the founding directors of the Abstainers and General Insurance Company and later became its Vice Chairman. After leaving the ministry he became a member of the London Chamber of Commerce.

Over around 30 years he delivery some 500–600 Sundary afternoon lectures. He also found time to write some 20 books including "Old, Yet Ever New", "Is My Bible True?", "OUR BIBLE - How We Got It", and "Sermons to Working Men". He also edited a paper called the Factory Herald for some years.

Not content with that he became a guide for Thomas Cook and Son leading parties to the Holy Land. He was to visit the country some eleven times and the trips were always timed to bring the groups to Jerusalem in time for Easter.

He had not been so fortunate in his private life, and he lost his two sons, Herbert and Harry, in infancy, and two of his four daughters, Ada and Dora, to TB, both at the age of 24. Only the first born, Elizabeth, and the last, Mabel, survived him.

== Member of Parliament ==
In May 1908 Leach was invited to contest the Colne Valley constituency as a Liberal Party candidate. A former member of the Independent Labour Party, he described himself as an "evolutionary socialist". He was described by The Times as a weak candidate, but one who stood to inherit the strong Colne Valley Liberal vote, and at the January 1910 general election, he defeated the Independent MP Victor Grayson. The votes were counted and the result declared at Slaithwaite Town Hall.

He made his maiden speech on 11 April 1910 supporting one of the resolutions that led up to the Parliament Act 1911. He was re-elected in December 1910, when he only faced a Conservative opponent. Leach supported women's suffrage, but registered his opposition to the actions of the suffragettes. He also supported the Government in passing the National Insurance Act 1911. In February 1911 he introduced his private members Trade Union Bill to try to overcome the problems caused by the Osborne judgment, but it was to disappear into the parliamentary timetable. Despite this he was a very active backbencher asking numerous questions of ministers.

Leach continued to preach occasionally while a Member of Parliament; he also travelled widely including to the near East, Canada and the United States.

== Health problem ==
Appointed as a Chaplain to the Armed Forces, 4th class, during the First World War (at outbreak of which he was 67 years old), his duty was to visit the wounded in the London Military Hospitals. In 1915 the strain of this and his parliamentary duties became too much and he dropped out of public life. It was reported that he had suffered a nervous breakdown, and had to move to a nursing home in London. In reality it was much starker and he had been committed to Northumberland House, Green Lanes, a private lunatic asylum. He was declared to be suffering from an unsound mind, brain deterioration and loss of memory. This would appear to have some physical cause and may well have been vascular dementia caused by small strokes or similar. Some eight months later he was found still to be of unsound mind and his seat was declared vacant under the Lunacy (Vacating of Seats) Act 1886 – the only MP ever disqualified under that Act. Probably this was due to Parliament having already been prolonged and it being impossible to hold a general election while the war persisted. Normally MPs are just allowed to retire quietly at the next election. At the resulting by-election on 25 August 1916, the Liberal Frederick Mallalieu was elected unopposed to succeed him.

Leach died in 1919, aged 72.

== Notes ==
Parliament of the United Kingdom
Preceded by Victor Grayson	Member of Parliament for Colne Valley; 1910–1916	Succeeded by Frederick Mallalieu
