= Leonard Hall (socialist) =

English journalist, trade unionist and socialist activist

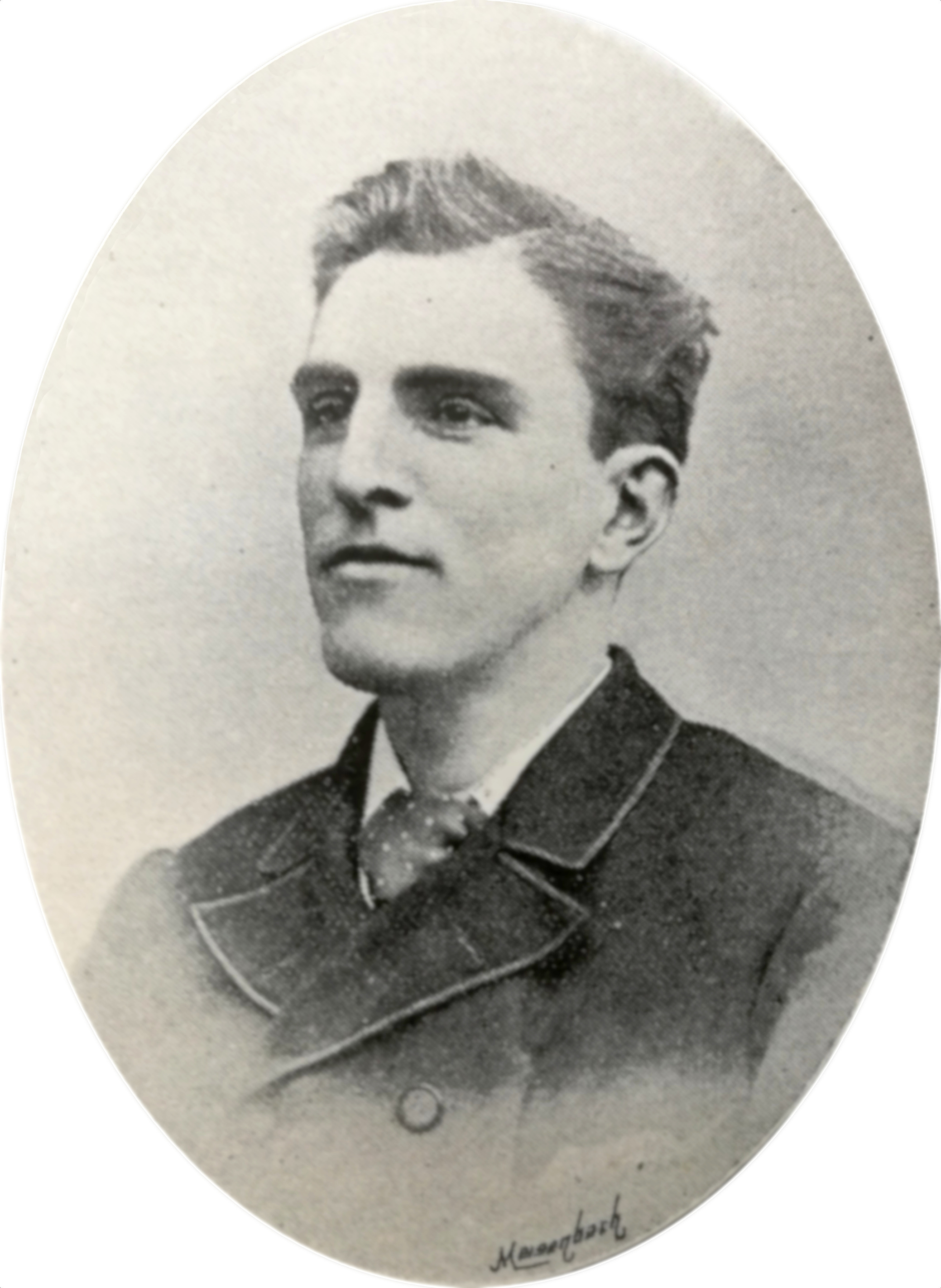
Hall in 1895

William Leonard Hall (1866 – 29 June 1916) was a British trade union leader, journalist, and socialist activist, who held prominent positions in the Independent Labour Party.

== Biography ==
Born in Windermere, then part of Cumberland, he was one of six children of Spencer Timothy Hall, a homeopath with degrees from the University of Tübingen and University of Cincinnati. However, these degrees were not recognised in the UK, leaving the family in financial difficulty. Leonard left school at the age of thirteen to work delivering parcels. He undertook various jobs until he was sixteen, when he became a sailor. He travelled to the United States, and worked there for a time, including a stint as a cowboy.

In the United States, Hall joined the Knights of Labor. He moved to Manchester in England in 1888, becoming leader of the local branch of the Socialist League. He worked part-time as a journalist, and part-time as the Lancashire district secretary of the Navvies, Bricklayers' Labourers and General Labourers' Union. In this role, he attempted to organise workers from a wide variety of industries. He and Tom Fox led a campaign to improve the working conditions of the navvies building the Manchester Ship Canal. Hall launched the Navvies Guide journal, and this agitation led to the formation of the Manchester Ship Canal Navvies Union. In 1889, he became the first general secretary of the Navvies' Union, which grew to 3,000 members. However, it suffered a major split in 1890, and Hall supplemented his income by working as editor of the Eccles Advertiser.

Hall was supportive of broader labour movement initiatives. He was active on the Manchester and Salford Trades Council, and in 1892 ran a joint recruitment campaign with the Colne Valley Labour League. In 1893, he was a founder member of the Independent Labour Party (ILP), and became secretary of its Lancashire and Cheshire Federation. From 1894 to 1896, he served on the National Administrative Council (NAC) of the ILP. He was adopted as the party's prospective parliamentary candidate for Manchester North East at the 1895 UK general election. An opponent claimed that he was misusing union funds to support his candidature; an enquiry found that the charge was baseless, but he decided to withdraw from the election, leaving the ILP to instead stand James Johnston. He was involved in the free speech campaign at Boggart Hole Clough, speaking in defiance of a ban by Manchester City Council, and for this served one month in Strangeways Prison, causing his family serious financial problems.

Hall stood down as leader of the Navvies Union in 1897, and a few years later, he moved to Birmingham. He was re-elected to the ILP's NAC in 1909, as part of a left-wing group including J. M. McLachlan and Russell Smart. Concerned about the direction of the Labour Party under Ramsay MacDonald and the ILP's role in this, Hall contributed to a document entitled Let us reform the Labour Party, but generally known as the Green Manifesto. This was condemned by a majority on the NAC, and C. T. Douthwaite, Hall and Smart were the leading ILP figures to attend the 1911 Socialist Unity conference organised by the Social Democratic Federation. This formed the British Socialist Party (BSP), and Hall joined the new party, winning election to its executive in 1912. However, disappointed at the BSP's rejection of syndicalism, he and Smart resigned in 1912.

Outside the BSP, Hall founded a small syndicalist organisation in Birmingham, linked with Tom Mann's The Syndicalist journal, but it attracted only around twenty members. He later joined the Socialist Labour Party.

Hall was killed in 1916 after accidentally tripping in front of a bus he meant to board on Paradise Street in front of Queen's College, Birmingham. At the inquest into his death, his daughter Nellie stated that his eyesight had been poor of late. He had been planning a trip to the United States and was on his way to get his passport signed for the journey when he was killed. He was 49.

Trade union offices
Preceded by New position	General Secretary of the British Labour Amalgamation; 1889–1897	Succeeded by Tom Fox
Party political offices
Preceded by Harry Brockhouse	Midlands Division representative on the National Administrative Council of the Independent Labour Party; 1909–1911	Succeeded by J. W. Kneeshaw
