= Victor Grayson =

English socialist politician (1881–c.1920)

Albert Victor Grayson
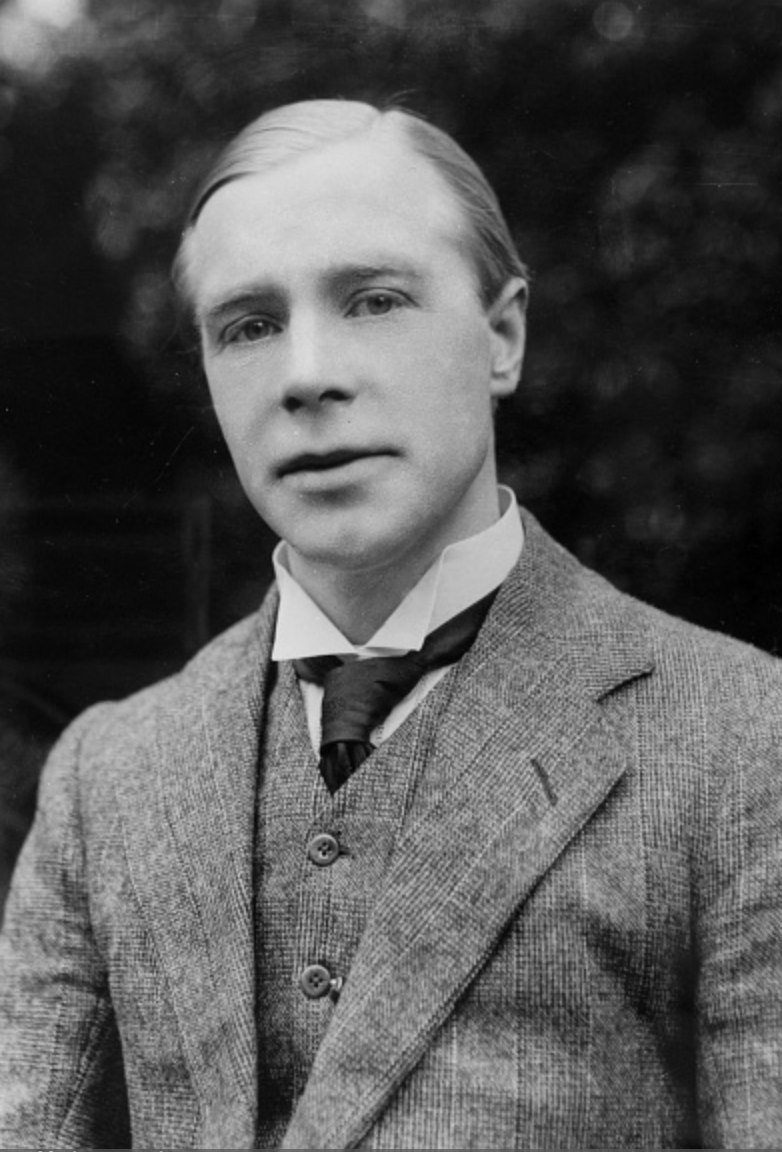
- Grayson c. 1908

Member of Parliament for Colne Valley
- In office 18 July 1907 – January 1910
- Preceded by: James Kitson, 1st Baron Airedale
- Succeeded by: Charles Leach

Personal details
- Born: 5 August 1881 Liverpool, England
- Died: 28 September 1920 (disappeared) (aged 39) London, England
- Party: Independent Labour Party
- Other political affiliations: British Socialist Party

Military service
- Allegiance: United Kingdom
- Branch/service: New Zealand Army
- Battles/wars: World War I

Albert Victor Grayson (born 5 September 1881, disappeared 28 September 1920) was an English socialist politician of the early 20th century. An Independent Labour Party Member of Parliament from 1907 to 1910, Grayson is most notable for his sensational by-election victory at Colne Valley, and unexplained disappearance in 1920.

== Early years ==
Albert Victor Grayson was born in Liverpool, the seventh son of William Grayson, a Yorkshire carpenter, and Elizabeth Craig, who was Scottish. He became an apprentice engineer in Bootle. Grayson joined the Independent Labour Party (ILP) and toured the country giving lectures, becoming a well-known orator despite having a stammer. In 1907 he stood as an ILP candidate in the 1907 Colne Valley by-election, having been nominated by the Colne Valley Labour League; he won a sensational, albeit narrow, victory. Grayson was paid an allowance by the ILP but refused to sign the Labour Party constitution.

Grayson was subject to an assessment by Winston Churchill in 1908: "The Socialism of the Christian era was based on the idea that, 'All mine is yours,' but the Socialism of Mr Grayson is based on the idea that 'All yours is mine.'" Writing of Grayson in 1913 in an article on British radical politics in Pravda, Vladimir Lenin noted that Grayson was "a very fiery socialist, but one not strong in principles and given to phrase-mongering."

Grayson rarely attended the House of Commons and began to develop a drinking problem. He lost his seat in the January 1910 general election and failed to retain his deposit when standing for Kennington in December 1910. In 1911, he was involved with setting up the British Socialist Party.

He continued his lecture tours but suffered a mental breakdown in 1913 and in August 1914 was declared bankrupt with debts of £496. Grayson later alienated many of his left-wing colleagues by backing Britain's entry into World War I and turning his oratorical skills to recruiting soldiers. He enlisted in 1916 and served briefly in the New Zealand Army and was wounded the following year on the Western Front. After the war, Grayson attempted to resurrect his political career.

== Personal life ==
In his early life, Grayson conducted a longterm affair with Harry Dawson, a fellow Merseyside socialist. In one of a collection of love letters written to Dawson, he wrote: "I love you as ever, with the same devouring passion and intensity and thickness."

In 1912, Grayson married Ruth Nightingale, a young actress with boyish looks, with whom he had a daughter. The marriage was unhappy and Ruth died in childbirth in the 1918 influenza epidemic.

== Honours scandal ==
In 1918, Sir Basil Thomson, head of the Special Branch, asked Maundy Gregory to spy on Grayson, suspecting him of working as an agent for the new communist government in Russia or for the Irish Republican Army. Grayson discovered that Gregory was spying on him and, with the help of some important friends, found out that Prime Minister David Lloyd George was using Gregory to sell political honours.

At a public meeting in Liverpool, Grayson accused Lloyd George of selling honours for between £10,000 and £40,000. He declared: "This sale of honours is a national scandal. It can be traced right down to 10 Downing Street, and to a monocled dandy with offices in Whitehall. I know this man, and one day I will name him." Grayson's "monocled dandy" remark let Gregory know that he was in danger of being exposed. Grayson also suspected Gregory of having forged Roger Casement's diaries, which were used as evidence to convict and execute him for treason (although it later turned out that Casement had engaged in the homosexual activities described).

At the beginning of September 1920, Grayson was beaten up in the Strand. This was probably an attempt to frighten him, but he continued threatening to name the man behind the corrupt system.

== Disappearance ==
By 1920, Grayson was living in an expensive suite of rooms in Piccadilly, although he earned only a modest income from occasional pieces of journalism. Biographer David Clark believes that, having alienated both the socialists and the trade unions, Grayson had entered into blackmail in order to fund his lavish lifestyle.

On 28 September 1920, Grayson was out drinking with friends when he received a telephone message. He told his friends that he had to go to the Queen's Hotel in Leicester Square and would be back shortly. He did not return.

Journalist Donald McCormick claims that artist George Flemwell had been painting a picture of the Thames when he saw Grayson passing him in an electric canoe, along with Maundy Gregory. Flemwell further observed the two men entering a house (Number 6, The Island, Thames Ditton) on the river bank on 28 September 1920. Flemwell knew Grayson, having painted his portrait before the war, but did not realise the significance at the time because Grayson was not reported missing until several months later. An investigation carried out in the 1960s revealed that the house that Grayson entered was owned by Gregory. Research by Andrew Cook suggests that McCormick may have fabricated the story.

It has been speculated that Grayson was murdered to prevent his revealing evidence of corruption. A comprehensive biography by David G. Clark suggests he possibly survived into the 1950s under a pseudonym. Clark believes Grayson was bribed in order to keep quiet about the honours scandal, and was told to forge a new identity.

== See also ==
- List of people who disappeared
- Vic Feather (1908–76) – a prominent 1970s trade union leader who was named after Grayson

== Footnotes ==
Parliament of the United Kingdom
Preceded by Sir James Kitson, Bt.	Member of Parliament for Colne Valley; 1907–1910	Succeeded by Charles Leach
