= Fest Magazine =

Edinburgh Festival free publication

- Type: Weekly magazine (August only)
- Format: A5 glossy
- Owner: Radge Media Limited
- Editor: Arusa Qureshi
- Deputy editor: Louis Cammell
- Founded: 2002
- Headquarters: Edinburgh
- Circulation: 125,000 (August 2018)
- Price: Free
- Website: festmag.com

Fest Magazine is an Edinburgh-based arts magazine that publishes during the Edinburgh Festival each year. It is a free, weekly (bi-weekly until 2022), A5 glossy publication distributed through key Festival venues.

== History ==
Fest was established in 2002 as an alternative Edinburgh Festival review guide by then University of Edinburgh students, Dan Lerner and Helen Pidd, now Northern England Editor of The Guardian. The guide started life as a 32-page tabloid newspaper that published three times per week during August. It began with the support of Time Out and in conjunction with a large number of student writers from the University of Edinburgh student newspaper Student.

In 2003, Fest relocated from the basement office at the Pleasance Courtyard venue and began to establish a reputation among Fringe-goers as a strong youth-oriented, independent arts magazine. Media partnerships were established with The BBC and Big Issue Scotland between 2003 and 2005.

In 2007, Fest adopted an A5 glossy magazine format at 100 pages, and in 2008 launched an accompanying A4 preview magazine distributed before the start of the festival. In 2014 the preview edition became A5 to match the August review editions.

In 2015, Fest was taken into the Radge Media stable of titles, who also publish local culture publication The Skinny Magazine.

In 2018, Fest launched a sister edition in Adelaide, Australia to cover the Adelaide Fringe, Adelaide Festival and WOMADelaide.

In 2022, after a pandemic-induced hiatus, Fest relaunched with a new logo and new model, publishing weekly instead of bi-weekly during the Fringe.

== Awards ==
In 2006, Fest writer and theatre editor, Miles Johnson, was awarded the Allen Wright Award for Excellence in Journalism for his feature "Bowling with The Hamiltons", against competition from The Scotsman, The List and The Sunday Herald. Johnson, 21 at the time, was also the Allen Wright Award's youngest winner in its nine-year history. Editor Sam Friedman was also nominated for the award.

Fest received an additional two nominations in 2007 through Nana Wereko-Brobby and Yasmin Sulaiman. Fest was also listed among The Times Top Five Festival Websites in 2005.
