= British Labour Amalgamation =

Former trade union of the United Kingdom

The British Labour Amalgamation was an early union representing construction workers, principally in Manchester area of England.

The union was organised during 1888 by Leonard Hall, to represent workers constructing the Manchester Ship Canal. Initially named the Manchester Ship Canal Navvies Union, Hall was elected as its first secretary, early in 1889, and its membership soon rose above 3,000. However, all its members in Lancashire and Cheshire left in November 1890, forming the Lancashire and Adjacent Counties Labour Amalgamation, and by 1894 the canal was complete, membership falling to only 450. Hall stood down in 1897, and was replaced as secretary by Tom Fox.

Under Fox's leadership, the union successfully recruited construction workers on other projects and by 1900 had more than 2,000 members. Due to the changed nature of its membership, it was then renamed as the "British Labour Amalgamation". In 1902, the Lancashire Enginemen, Cranemen and Firemen Electrical and Hydraulic Attendants' Association joined, although most of its former members left again in 1906. It highest membership, 4,872, was reached in 1913, and it merged into the National Union of General Workers in 1917.
