= Spencer Timothy Hall =

- Born: 16 December 1812; Sutton-in-Ashfield, Nottinghamshire, England
- Died: 26 April 1885 (aged 72); Blackpool, England
- Resting place: Layton Cemetery
- Education: University of Tübingen (MA, PhD)
- Occupations: Writer, mesmerist
- Children: 6, including Leonard Hall
- Parent(s): Samuel Hall (father); Eleanor Spencer (mother)

Spencer Timothy Hall (16 December 1812 – 26 April 1885) was an English writer and mesmerist.

== Early life ==
He was born in a cottage near Sutton-in-Ashfield in Sherwood Forest, Nottinghamshire, the son of Samuel Hall, a Quaker cobbler and Eleanor Spencer, a dairymaid. He received some education from his father and at seven years of age entered the weaving trade.

== Career ==
After reading the life of Benjamin Franklin, Hall resolved to become a printer. In January 1829, he went to Nottingham and was apprenticed at the office of The Mercury newspaper. He began writing poetry, and by 1832 he was contributing verse to The Mirror, The Metropolitan Magazine, and other periodicals.

In 1836, Hall returned to Sutton-in-Ashfield, where he started his own printing and bookselling business and printed a monthly periodical called the Sherwood Magazine, in which he published his work under the pseudonym "The Sherwood Forester". In May 1839, he joined the printing firm Hargrove at York. In 1841, he published a volume of prose and verse entitled The Forester's Offering. The book earned Hall an invitation from James Montgomery to Sheffield, where he became co-editor of The Iris newspaper and governor of the Hollis Hospital. He wrote a volume of prose sketches entitled Rambles in the Country for The Iris; it was reissued in an enlarged form in 1853 as The Peak and the Plain. As the result of a visit to Ireland in the famine years he published Life and Death in Ireland as Witnessed in 1849 (1850).

Hall was also interested in popular scientific movements. He was the first honorary secretary of the Sheffield Phrenological Society and later an honorary member of the Phrenological Society of Glasgow. In 1841, he learned about mesmerism from watching some spectacular demonstrations by a Frenchman named Lafontaine, who was touring northern England. Hall then taught himself mesmerism and began to make his own tours of the country, giving public demonstrations, offering tutelage and therapy, and selling copies of a journal he founded in 1843, The Phreno-Magnet, or, Mirror of Nature. His most illustrious patient was Harriet Martineau, whom, it seems, he cured of an apparently hopeless disease of the uterus. Martineau was first diagnosed in 1839; after over five years of suffering, she was introduced to mesmerism by her brother-in-law, who had been impressed by one of Hall's lectures in Newcastle. "Everything that medical skill and family care could do for me had been tried, without any avail", Martineau wrote in her Autobiography (1877); "Now that a new experiment was proposed to me … I had nothing to do but try it".

About 1852, Hall became a homoeopathic doctor and published Homoeopathy: A Testimony (1852). He was granted the honorary degrees of MA and PhD from Tübingen.

== Personal life ==
He was married twice: his first wife, Sarah, died only nine months after their wedding; his second marriage produced six children, including the socialist activist Leonard Hall.

== Death ==
He died at Blackpool on 26 April 1885, and was buried in Layton Cemetery.

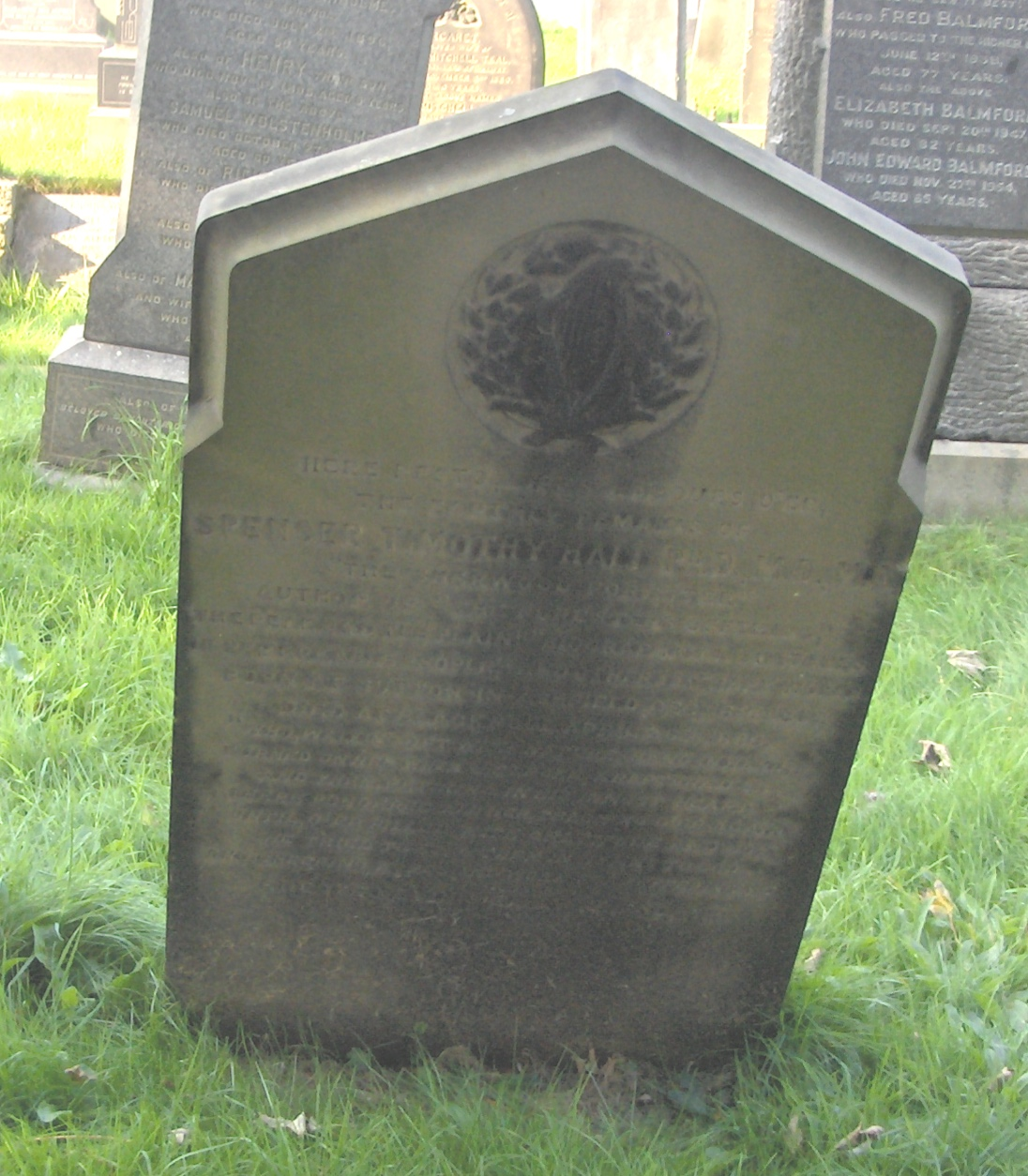
Spencer Timothy Hall's grave
