= Hilary Wainwright =

British magazine editor (born 1949)

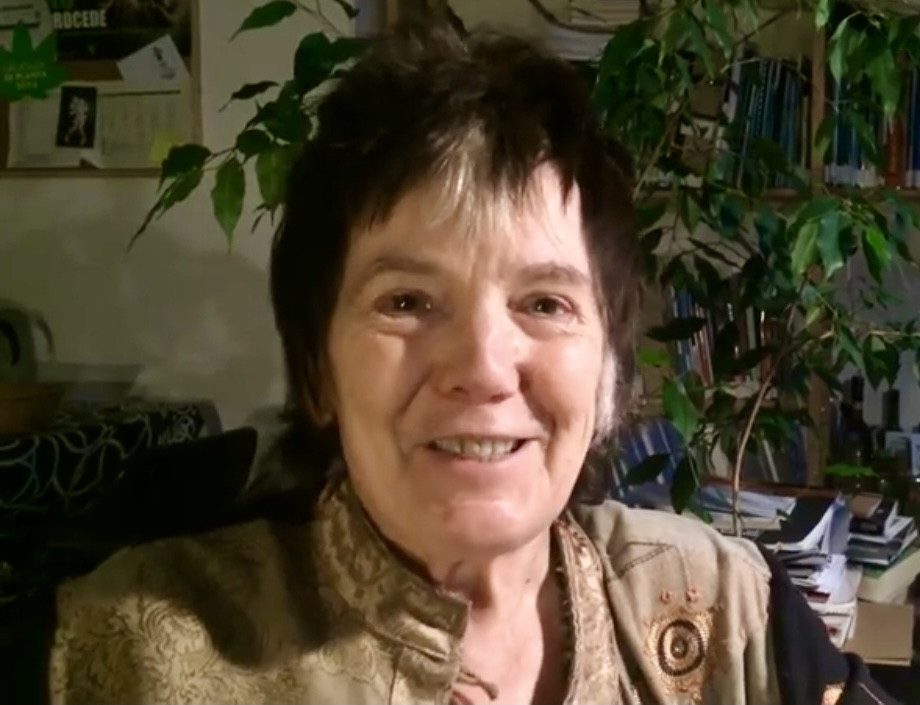
- Wainwright in 2016
- Born: 1949 (age 76–77); United Kingdom
- Education: Mount School; St Anne's College, Oxford; St Antony's College, Oxford (BPhil)
- Occupations: Editor, fellow, journalist, political activist, professor, research fellow, sociologist
- Employer(s): Durham University (until 1979); Open University (1979–1981); University of California; University of Wisconsin–Madison
- Notable credit(s): Co-editor, Red Pepper
- Spouse: Roy Bhaskar (m. 1971; died 2014)
- Parent: Richard Wainwright (father)
- Relatives: Martin Wainwright (brother)

Hilary Wainwright (born 1949) is a British sociologist, political activist and socialist feminist, best known for being a co-editor of Red Pepper magazine.

== Early life and education ==
Wainwright's father was the Liberal MP Richard Wainwright. Her brother, Martin, was formerly the Northern Editor of The Guardian, to which she has occasionally contributed.

Wainwright was educated at the Mount School, York, and St Anne's College, Oxford, where she studied Philosophy, Politics, and Economics (PPE). She graduated in 1970. She gained a Bachelor of Philosophy (BPhil) in Sociology from St Antony's College, Oxford in 1973.

== Life and career ==
Until 1979, Wainwright was a research fellow at the Department of Sociology at Durham University. From 1979 to 1981, she was a researcher at the Technology Department of the Open University. In 1982, she became Ken Livingstone's Deputy Chief Economic Advisor to the Greater London Council (GLC).

Wainwright is a Fellow of the international think tank for progressive politics, the Transnational Institute, Amsterdam; Senior Research Associate at the International Centre for Participation Studies at the Department for Peace Studies, University of Bradford, UK and previously research fellow at the Centre for the Study of Global Governance at the London School of Economics. She has also been a visiting professor and scholar at the University of California, Los Angeles; Havens Center, University of Wisconsin, Madison, and Todai University, Tokyo. Formerly on the editorial board of New Left Review, she was also on the National Council of the Catalyst think tank.

A researcher and writer, Wainwright is concerned with the emergence of new forms of democratic accountability within parties, movements and the state. She has documented examples of resurgent democratic movements in many countries around the world and the lessons they provide for progressive politics.

In July 2015, Wainwright endorsed Jeremy Corbyn's campaign in the Labour Party leadership election. She said: "To be honest, the Labour Party isn't worth that valuable three quid. But a platform for someone who not only insists that there is an alternative, but stretches himself to support everyone who is fighting for it, is beyond anything that money can buy." She added: "I believe Jeremy Corbyn should be supported not as an attempt to 'reclaim the Labour Party' but as a transition to a political organisation beyond the Labour Party and beyond parliamentary politics".

Wainwright has written for The Guardian, The Nation, New Statesman, openDemocracy, Jacobin, Carta, Il Manifesto and El Viejo Topo, as well as appearing as a commentator on the BBC. Wainwright is a founding member and co-editor of the Red Pepper political magazine.

== Personal life and honours ==
In 1971, Wainwright married the British philosopher Roy Bhaskar. The couple remained close lifelong friends after their separation and never divorced. She received an Honorary DLitt from the University of Huddersfield on 28 November 2007, along with Martin Wainwright, for "services to journalism".

== Select bibliography ==
- Reclaim the State: Experiments in Popular Democracy (Seagull books, 2009), ISBN 978-1-905422-60-9
- Public service reform - But not as we know it! (Compass/UNISON, 2009), ISBN 978-0-9560370-5-3
- Reclaim the State: Experiments in Popular Democracy (Verso Books, 2003), ISBN 978-1-85984-689-6
- Arguments for a New Left: Answering the Free-market Right (Blackwell, 1994), ISBN 978-0-631-19191-9
- Labour: A Tale of Two Parties (Hogarth Press/Chatto Windus, London, 1987).
- A Taste of Power: The Politics of Local Economics (Verso Books, London, October 1987) (co-edited with Maureen MacIntosh).
- The Lucas Plan: A New Trade Unionism in the Making? (first published by Allison and Busby, 1981) (co-authored with Dave Elliott), ISBN 0805280987.
- Beyond the Fragments: Feminism and the Making of Socialism (Merlin Press, 1980) (co-authored with Sheila Rowbotham and Lynne Segal).
- The Workers Report of Vickers (Pluto Press, 1978) (co-authored with Huw Benyon).
