= Red Pepper (magazine) =

Political magazine in the UK

- April 2024 cover
- Co-Editors: Sanaa Alimia, Malia Bouattia, Kimon Daltas, Gerry Hart, Lydia Hughes, Andrew Hedges, Liam Kennedy, Siobhán McGuirk, Amardeep Singh Dhillon Hilary Wainwright, Ananya Wilson-Bhattacharya, Jake Woodier, Rhian E. Jones
- Categories: Eco-socialist
- Frequency: Quarterly
- Circulation: 7,000
- Founded: 1995; 31 years ago
- Country: United Kingdom
- Based in: London
- Website: www.redpepper.org.uk
- ISSN: 1353-7024

Red Pepper is an independent "radical red and green" magazine based in the United Kingdom. For the first half of its history it appeared monthly, but relaunched as a bi-monthly during 2007. In its current format, Red Pepper is published as a quarterly magazine, alongside original online content published on its website.

== Origins ==
Red Pepper was founded by the Socialist Movement, an independent left-wing grouping that grew out of a series of large conferences held in Chesterfield in 1987 and 1988 after the defeat of Britain's miners' strike of the mid-1980s. In autumn 1991, the Socialist Movement set up a campaigning, fortnightly newspaper called Socialist. It lasted through September 1992.

Supporters of Socialist were convinced that there was a demand for a regular green-left publication, published independently of any political party. After a fundraising drive, which raised an initial £135,000, Red Pepper launched as a monthly in May 1995.

Its first editor was Denise Searle, who had also edited Socialist. However, for most of its history, it has been edited by socialist and feminist Hilary Wainwright, best known as the co-author of Beyond the Fragments. From 2004, she became co-editor alongside Oscar Reyes. In July 2009, Reyes stepped down and James O'Nions and Michael Calderbank replaced him, with Emma Hughes and Sarah-Jayne Clifton joining the editorial team in 2010. Now more of an editorial collective, the magazine today is edited by Wainwright, Calderbank and Ruth Potts. Prominent journalists involved with the publication at some point include Laurie Penny, Gary Younge and Barbara Gunnell.

The magazine's reported circulation in November 1995 was 13,000 copies. In 2004, circulation was reportedly 7,000 copies.

== Politics ==
Red Pepper's editorial charter commits it to "Internationalism; sustainable, socially useful production; welfare not warfare; and self-determination and democracy."

This charter claims it as: "a magazine of political rebellion and dissent. Influenced by socialism, feminism and green politics, it is a resource for all those who imagine and work to create another world – a world based on equality, solidarity, and democracy".

The magazine is unusual for the UK left, insofar as it is independent of any political party. Red Pepper has also collaborated in "Eurotopia", a network of left and progressive European magazines that publishes a multilingual supplement. The magazine sees itself as closely aligned with the global justice movement and has taken part in the organising for the European Social Forum. More recently, Red Pepper has supported Labour leader Jeremy Corbyn and Momentum festival The World Transformed.
