= Colne Valley (constituency) =

Parliamentary constituency in the United Kingdom, 1885 onwards

Coordinates: 53.620°N 1.861°W

- County constituency for the House of Commons
- Interactive map of boundaries from 2024
- Boundary of Colne Valley in Yorkshire and the Humber
- County: West Yorkshire
- Electorate: 84,744 (December 2019)
- Major settlements: Holmfirth, Marsden, Slaithwaite, Huddersfield (West)

Current constituency
- Created: 1885
- Member of Parliament: Paul Davies (Labour)
- Seats: One
- Created from: Southern West Riding of Yorkshire

Colne Valley is a constituency (Note: A county constituency (for the purposes of election expenses and type of returning officer)) represented in the House of Commons of the UK Parliament since 2024 by Paul Davies of the Labour Party. (Note: As with all constituencies, the constituency elects one Member of Parliament (MP) by the first past the post system of election at least every five years.)

== Constituency profile ==
The seat is named after the Colne, one of three rivers so-named in the UK and one of three main rivers in the seat; its three main towns sit on hillsides and moorland, and the local dwellings are mainly stone-built. Retirees make up a sizeable proportion of the area's residents, as celebrated in the long-running television comedy Last of the Summer Wine, which is centred on Holmfirth within the seat. The wider Colne and Holme Valleys still retain some agriculture, such as the Longley Farm dairy whose products are sold nationwide. The south-west of the constituency, bordering with Oldham and High Peak, Derbyshire, is within the Peak District and the area includes Marsden Moor Estate. Moving eastwards, the constituency also includes some of Huddersfield's western suburbs, such as generally affluent Lindley, and Golcar.

In between Marsden and Huddersfield, the former mill town of Slaithwaite was named the best place to live in Yorkshire by The Times in 2022. Slaithwaite and environs is a growing commuter area with regular rail connections to both Manchester and Leeds.

== Political history ==
In the three decades post-World War II, the area had the distinction of being one of the few Labour/Liberal marginals, changing hands between the parties on several occasions. Since 1983, it has been a three-way marginal seat. It was a bellwether constituency from the 1987 general election to the 2017 general election, which saw Labour's Thelma Walker narrowly gain the seat from the Conservatives while the latter remained the largest party in Parliament. The Liberal Democrats retained much of their strength in the area until the 2010 general election, but in 2017; they lost their deposit with just 4.1% of the vote. Since the 1964 general election, the only occasion when the winning candidate's majority exceeded 10% of the votes cast was in 1992, and three different parties have held the seat during this period. Since 1987 it has been won by either Conservative or Labour candidates.

Colne Valley was one of 17 seats won (held or gained) by a Labour candidate in 2017 from a total of 22 covering its county, with Thelma Walker's 2017 win being one of 30 net gains of the Labour Party. However, former MP Jason McCartney took the seat back for the Conservatives in 2019, only to lose it again to Labour's Paul Davies at the 2024 general election.

== Boundaries ==
This semi-rural constituency encompasses the Colne Valley, Holme Valley, Meltham and the outskirts of the large town of Huddersfield in the district of Kirklees, West Yorkshire. In addition to the Huddersfield suburbs of Golcar and Lindley, the constituency comprises rural countryside broken up by the towns of Holmfirth and Meltham and the villages of Marsden, Slaithwaite, Honley, Brockholes, Linthwaite, New Mill and Golcar. The seat was once held by the Independent Labour MP Victor Grayson, who later disappeared in mysterious circumstances in 1920.

The area of Saddleworth, which lies on the western side of the Pennines unlike the rest of the constituency and is not part of the Colne Valley, became part of the new metropolitan county of Greater Manchester in 1974, and from 1983 became part of a new constituency along with Littleborough.

In 1981, the Boundary Commission proposed to combine much of the seat with a large portion of the Huddersfield West seat. Originally it was proposed to use the Huddersfield West name for the new constituency, but this was opposed at a public inquiry in which it was argued that the Colne Valley name be preserved.

1885–1918: The Municipal Borough of Huddersfield, and parts of the Sessional Divisions of Saddleworth and Upper Aggbrigg.

1918–1950: The Urban Districts of Farnley Tyas, Golcar, Holme, Holmfirth, Honley, Linthwaite, Marsden, Meltham, New Mill, Saddleworth, Scammonden, Slaithwaite, South Crosland, Springhead, and Thurstonland.

1950–1955: The Urban Districts of Colne Valley, Holmfirth, Kirkburton, Meltham, and Saddleworth.

1955–1983: The Urban Districts of Colne Valley, Denby Dale, Holmfirth, Meltham, and Saddleworth.

1983–2010: The Metropolitan Borough of Kirklees wards of Colne Valley West, Crosland Moor, Golcar, Holme Valley North, Holme Valley South, and Lindley.

2010–2024: The Metropolitan Borough of Kirklees wards of Colne Valley, Crosland Moor and Netherton, Golcar, Holme Valley North, Holme Valley South, and Lindley.

2024–present: The Borough of Kirklees wards of Colne Valley, Golcar, Holme Valley North, Holme Valley South, Lindley.

Further to the 2023 periodic review of Westminster constituencies, the Crosland Moor and Netherton ward was transferred to Huddersfield in order to bring the electorate within the permitted range.

== Members of Parliament ==
Southern West Riding of Yorkshire prior to 1885

Election	Member	Party
1885	Henry Beaumont	Liberal
1886	Henry Beaumont	Liberal Unionist
1892	Sir James Kitson	Liberal
1907 by-election	Victor Grayson	Colne Valley Labour
1910	Charles Leach	Liberal
1916 by-election	Frederick Mallalieu	Liberal
1916	Frederick Mallalieu	Coalition Liberal
Jan 1922	Frederick Mallalieu	National Liberal
Feb 1922	Frederick Mallalieu	Liberal
1922	Philip Snowden	Labour
1931	Philip Snowden	National Labour
1931	Lance Mallalieu	Liberal
1935	Ernest Marklew	Labour
1939 by-election	Glenvil Hall	Labour
1963 by-election	Patrick Duffy	Labour
1966	Richard Wainwright	Liberal
1970	David Clark	Labour
1974	Richard Wainwright	Liberal
1987	Graham Riddick	Conservative
1997	Kali Mountford	Labour
2010	Jason McCartney	Conservative
2017	Thelma Walker	Labour
2019	Jason McCartney	Conservative
2024	Paul Davies	Labour

== Elections ==
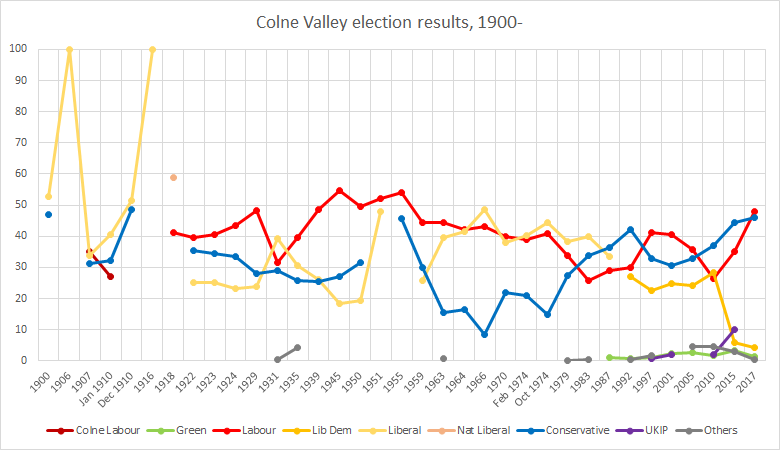
Colne Valley election results

=== Elections in the 2020s ===
General election 2024: Colne Valley
Party	Candidate	Votes	%	±%
Labour	Paul Davies	18,970	41.0	+4.8
Conservative	Jason McCartney	14,007	30.3	−20.9
Reform	Stuart Hale	7,298	15.8	+13.7
Green	Heather Peacock	3,480	7.5	+5.8
Liberal Democrats	Katharine Macy	2,007	4.3	−2.7
Yorkshire	Timothy Millea	459	1.0	−0.1
Majority		4,963	10.7	N/A
Turnout		46,221	63.6	−8.8
Registered electors		72,638		
Labour gain from Conservative		Swing	▲12.9	

=== Elections in the 2010s ===
2019 notional result
Party	Vote	%
Conservative	26,517	51.2
Labour	18,756	36.2
Liberal Democrats	3,630	7.0
Brexit Party	1,089	2.1
Green	893	1.7
Others	880	1.7
Turnout	51,765	72.4
Electorate	71,518	

General election 2019: Colne Valley
Party	Candidate	Votes	%	±%
Conservative	Jason McCartney	29,482	48.4	+2.3
Labour	Thelma Walker	24,379	40.0	–7.8
Liberal Democrats	Cahal Burke	3,815	6.3	+2.2
Brexit Party	Sue Harrison	1,268	2.1	N/A
Green	Darryl Gould	1,068	1.7	+0.2
Yorkshire	Owen Aspinall	548	0.9	N/A
UKIP	Melanie Roberts	230	0.3	N/A
Independent	Colin Peel	102	0.2	N/A
Majority		5,103	8.4	N/A
Turnout		60,892	71.9	+0.3
Conservative gain from Labour		Swing	+4.9	

General election 2017: Colne Valley
Party	Candidate	Votes	%	±%
Labour	Thelma Walker	28,818	47.8	+12.8
Conservative	Jason McCartney	27,903	46.1	+1.7
Liberal Democrats	Cahal Burke	2,494	4.1	–1.9
Green	Sonia King	892	1.5	–1.9
Independent	Patricia Sadio	313	0.5	N/A
Majority		915	1.7	N/A
Turnout		60,420	71.6	+2.8
Labour gain from Conservative		Swing	+5.5	

General election 2015: Colne Valley
Party	Candidate	Votes	%	±%
Conservative	Jason McCartney	25,246	44.4	+7.4
Labour	Jane East	19,868	35.0	+8.6
UKIP	Melanie Roberts	5,734	10.1	+8.0
Liberal Democrats	Cahal Burke	3,407	6.0	–22.2
Green	Chas Ball	1,919	3.4	+1.8
Yorkshire First	Paul Salveson	572	1.0	N/A
Independent	Melodie Staniforth	54	0.1	N/A
Majority		5,378	9.4	+0.6
Turnout		56,800	68.8	–0.3
Conservative hold		Swing	–0.6	

General election 2010: Colne Valley
Party	Candidate	Votes	%	±%
Conservative	Jason McCartney	20,440	37.0	+4.1
Liberal Democrats	Nicola Turner	15,603	28.2	+3.7
Labour	Debbie Abrahams	14,589	26.4	–9.0
BNP	Barry Fowler	1,893	3.4	+0.6
UKIP	Melanie Roberts	1,163	2.1	N/A
Green	Chas Ball	867	1.6	–1.2
TUSC	Jackie Grunsell	741	1.3	N/A
Majority		4,837	8.8	–6.4
Turnout		55,296	69.1	+3.8
Conservative gain from Labour		Swing	+6.6	

=== Elections in the 2000s ===
General election 2005: Colne Valley
Party	Candidate	Votes	%	±%
Labour	Kali Mountford	17,536	35.8	−4.6
Conservative	Maggie Throup	16,035	32.8	+2.3
Liberal Democrats	Elisabeth Wilson	11,822	24.2	−0.7
BNP	Barry Fowler	1,430	2.9	N/A
Green	Lesley Hedges	1,295	2.6	+0.3
Veritas	Helen Martinek	543	1.1	N/A
Monster Raving Loony	Ian Mumford	259	0.5	N/A
Majority		1,501	3.0	−6.9
Turnout		48,920	66.0	+2.7
Labour hold		Swing	−3.4	

General election 2001: Colne Valley
Party	Candidate	Votes	%	±%
Labour	Kali Mountford	18,967	40.4	−0.9
Conservative	Philip Davies	14,328	30.5	−2.2
Liberal Democrats	Gordon Beever	11,694	24.9	+2.3
Green	Richard Plunkett	1,081	2.3	+1.4
UKIP	Arthur Quarmby	917	2.0	+1.2
Majority		4,639	9.9	+1.3
Turnout		46,987	63.3	−13.6
Labour hold		Swing	+1.5	

=== Elections in the 1990s ===
General election 1997: Colne Valley
Party	Candidate	Votes	%	±%
Labour	Kali Mountford	23,285	41.3	
Conservative	Graham Riddick	18,445	32.7	
Liberal Democrats	Nigel Priestley	12,755	22.6	
Socialist Labour	Alan J. Brooke	759	1.3	N/A
Green	Andy V. Cooper	493	0.9	
UKIP	J.D. Nunn	478	0.8	N/A
Monster Raving Loony	Melody Staniforth	196	0.3	N/A
Majority		4,840	8.6	N/A
Turnout		56,411	76.9	
Labour gain from Conservative		Swing		

General election 1992: Colne Valley
Party	Candidate	Votes	%	±%
Conservative	Graham Riddick	24,804	42.0	+5.6
Labour	John Harman	17,579	29.8	+0.7
Liberal Democrats	Nigel Priestley	15,953	27.0	−6.4
Green	Robin Stewart	443	0.8	−0.3
Monster Raving Loony	Melody Staniforth	160	0.3	N/A
Independent	John Hasty	73	0.1	N/A
Natural Law	James Tattersall	44	0.1	N/A
Majority		7,225	12.2	+9.2
Turnout		59,056	82.0	+1.9
Conservative hold		Swing	+2.5	

=== Elections in the 1980s ===
General election 1987: Colne Valley
Party	Candidate	Votes	%	±%
Conservative	Graham Riddick	20,457	36.4	+2.5
Liberal	Nigel Priestley	18,780	33.4	−6.4
Labour	John Harman	16,353	29.1	+3.3
Green	Mark Mullany	614	1.1	N/A
Majority		1,677	3.0	N/A
Turnout		56,204	80.1	+3.9
Conservative gain from Liberal		Swing	+4.5	

General election 1983: Colne Valley
Party	Candidate	Votes	%	±%
Liberal	Richard Wainwright	21,139	39.84	+12.05
Conservative	John Holt	17,993	33.91	+0.07
Labour	Arthur Williams	13,668	25.76	−12.39
Independent	Tom Keen	260	0.49	N/A
Majority		3,146	5.93	
Turnout		53,060	76.2	
Liberal gain from Labour		Swing		

- There had been significant boundary changes for this election, mainly due to the 1974 changes to local government, where the Saddleworth area was moved out of Yorkshire into the Oldham borough of Greater Manchester and became part of the Littleborough and Saddleworth constituency. To compensate, some of the western outskirts of Huddersfield were added to Colne Valley from the abolished Huddersfield West constituency. Therefore, although Wainwright was the incumbent MP for Colne Valley, it was estimated that had the seat been fought on the new boundaries in 1979, the Labour Party would have won it with a majority of 2,239.

=== Elections in the 1970s ===
General election 1979: Colne Valley
Party	Candidate	Votes	%	±%
Liberal	Richard Wainwright	20,151	38.4	−5.9
Labour	P. J. Hildrew	17,799	33.9	−7.0
Conservative	S. G. Kaye	14,450	27.5	+12.7
More Prosperous Britain	Tom Keen	101	0.2	N/A
Majority		2,352	4.5	+2.1
Turnout		52,501	81.8	+0.1
Liberal hold		Swing		

General election October 1974: Colne Valley
Party	Candidate	Votes	%	±%
Liberal	Richard Wainwright	21,997	44.3	+4.0
Labour	David Clark	20,331	40.9	+2.0
Conservative	Ken Davy	7,337	14.8	−6.1
Majority		1,666	3.4	+2.0
Turnout		49,665	81.7	−4.7
Liberal hold		Swing		

General election February 1974: Colne Valley
Party	Candidate	Votes	%	±%
Liberal	Richard Wainwright	20,984	40.3	+2.2
Labour	David Clark	20,265	38.9	−1.0
Conservative	Ken Davy	10,864	20.9	−1.1
Majority		719	1.4	N/A
Turnout		52,113	86.4	+5.8
Liberal gain from Labour		Swing		

General election 1970: Colne Valley
Party	Candidate	Votes	%	±%
Labour	David Clark	18,896	39.9	−3.2
Liberal	Richard Wainwright	18,040	38.1	−10.5
Conservative	Ken Davy	10,417	22.0	+13.6
Majority		856	1.8	N/A
Turnout		47,353	80.8	−5.4
Labour gain from Liberal		Swing		

=== Elections in the 1960s ===
General election 1966: Colne Valley
Party	Candidate	Votes	%	±%
Liberal	Richard Wainwright	22,006	48.6	+7.0
Labour	Patrick Duffy	19,507	43.1	+1.1
Conservative	R. David Hall	3,786	8.4	−7.9
Majority		2,499	5.5	N/A
Turnout		45,299	86.2	+1.4
Liberal gain from Labour		Swing		

General election 1964: Colne Valley
Party	Candidate	Votes	%	±%
Labour	Patrick Duffy	18,537	42.0	−2.5
Liberal	Richard Wainwright	18,350	41.6	+2.1
Conservative	Andrew Alexander	7,207	16.3	+0.9
Majority		187	0.4	−4.6
Turnout		44,094	84.8	
Labour hold		Swing		

1963 Colne Valley by-election
Party	Candidate	Votes	%	±%
Labour	Patrick Duffy	18,033	44.49	
Liberal	Richard Wainwright	15,994	39.46	
Conservative	Andrew Alexander	6,238	15.39	
Independent	A. Fox	266	0.66	N/A
Majority		2,039	5.03	
Turnout		40,531		
Labour hold		Swing		

=== Elections in the 1950s ===
General election 1959: Colne Valley
Party	Candidate	Votes	%	±%
Labour	Glenvil Hall	19,284	44.3	−9.9
Conservative	Christopher J. Barr	13,030	29.9	−15.9
Liberal	Richard Wainwright	11,254	25.8	N/A
Majority		6,254	14.4	+6.0
Turnout		43,568	84.2	+3.1
Labour hold		Swing		

General election 1955: Colne Valley
Party	Candidate	Votes	%	±%
Labour	Glenvil Hall	23,108	54.2	+2.0
Conservative	Stanley Cheetham	19,512	45.8	N/A
Majority		3,956	8.4	+4.0
Turnout		42,620	81.1	−6.0
Labour hold		Swing		

General election 1951: Colne Valley
Party	Candidate	Votes	%	±%
Labour	Glenvil Hall	26,455	52.2	+2.8
Liberal	Violet Bonham-Carter	24,266	47.8	+29.6
Majority		2,189	4.4	−13.6
Turnout		50,721	87.1	+0.6
Labour hold		Swing		

General election 1950: Colne Valley
Party	Candidate	Votes	%	±%
Labour	Glenvil Hall	24,910	49.4	−5.1
Conservative	E. E. Smith	15,826	31.4	+4.4
Liberal	Roy Francis Leslie	9,654	19.2	+0.8
Majority		9,084	18.0	−9.7
Turnout		50,390	86.5	+7.3
Labour hold		Swing		

=== Elections in the 1940s ===
General election 1945: Colne Valley
Party	Candidate	Votes	%	±%
Labour	Glenvil Hall	23,488	54.66	
Conservative	S. Smith	11,593	26.98	
Liberal	Guy Kepton Lawrence	7,890	18.36	
Majority		11,895	27.68	
Turnout		42,971	79.21	
Labour hold		Swing		

=== Elections in the 1930s ===
Colne Valley by-election, 1939
Party	Candidate	Votes	%	±%
Labour	Glenvil Hall	17,277	48.6	+6.3
Liberal	Lance Mallalieu	9,228	26.0	−4.6
Conservative	Cecil Pike	9,012	25.4	−0.4
Majority		8,049	22.6	+13.7
Turnout		35,517		
Labour hold		Swing		

General election 1935: Colne Valley
Party	Candidate	Votes	%	±%
Labour	Ernest Marklew	16,725	39.50	
Liberal	Lance Mallalieu	12,946	30.57	
Conservative	Sir Morgan George Crofton, 6th Baronet	10,917	25.78	
Ind. Conservative	Walter George Bagnall	1,754	4.14	N/A
Majority		3,779	8.93	N/A
Turnout		42,342	75.96	
Labour gain from Liberal		Swing		

General election 1931: Colne Valley
Party	Candidate	Votes	%	±%
Liberal	Lance Mallalieu	17,119	39.23	
Labour	Ernest Marklew	13,734	31.47	
Conservative	Edward ffrancis Ward Lascelles	12,581	28.88	
National Labour	Michael A E Franklin	202	0.46	N/A
Majority		3,385	7.76	
Turnout		43,636		
Liberal gain from Labour		Swing		

=== Elections in the 1920s ===
General election 1929: Colne Valley
Party	Candidate	Votes	%	±%
Labour	Philip Snowden	21,667	48.3	+5.0
Unionist	Robert B. Carrow	12,532	28.0	−5.4
Liberal	Fred Brook	10,630	23.7	+0.4
Majority		9,135	20.3	+10.4
Turnout		44,829	82.5	+3.9
Registered electors		53,351		
Labour hold		Swing	+5.2	

General election 1924: Colne Valley
Party	Candidate	Votes	%	±%
Labour	Philip Snowden	14,215	43.3	+2.9
Unionist	Fred Thorpe	10,972	33.4	−1.0
Liberal	Ronald Walker	7,651	23.3	−1.9
Majority		3,243	9.9	+3.9
Turnout		32,838	78.6	−0.4
Registered electors		41,794		
Labour hold		Swing	+2.0	

General election 1923: Colne Valley
Party	Candidate	Votes	%	±%
Labour	Philip Snowden	13,136	40.4	+0.9
Unionist	Thomas Brooke	11,215	34.4	−1.0
Liberal	Percy Holt Heffer	8,223	25.2	+0.1
Majority		1,921	6.0	+1.9
Turnout		32,574	79.0	+0.5
Registered electors		41,212		
Labour hold		Swing	+1.0	

General election 1922: Colne Valley
Party	Candidate	Votes	%	±%
Labour	Philip Snowden	12,614	39.5	−1.7
Unionist	Thomas Brooke	11,332	35.4	N/A
Liberal	Frederick Mallalieu	8,042	25.1	−33.7
Majority		1,282	4.1	N/A
Turnout		31,988	78.5	+19.6
Registered electors		40,724		
Labour gain from National Liberal		Swing	+16.0	

=== Elections in the 1910s ===
General election 1918: Colne Valley
Party		Candidate	Votes	%	±%
C	National Liberal	Frederick Mallalieu	13,541	58.8	+7.3
	Labour	Wilfrid Whiteley	9,473	41.2	N/A
Majority			4,068	17.6	+14.6
Turnout			23,014	58.9	−21.1
Registered electors			39,085		
	National Liberal hold		Swing	N/A	
C indicates candidate endorsed by the coalition government.

== Election results 1885–1918 ==
=== Elections in the 1880s ===
General election 1885: Colne Valley
Party	Candidate	Votes	%	±%
Liberal	Henry Frederick Beaumont	5,398	54.3	
Conservative	Thomas Brooke	4,541	45.7	
Majority		857	8.6	
Turnout		9,939	91.3	
Registered electors		10,881		
Liberal win (new seat)				

General election 1886: Colne Valley
Party	Candidate	Votes	%	±%
Liberal Unionist	Henry Frederick Beaumont	Unopposed		
Liberal Unionist gain from Liberal				

=== Elections in the 1890s ===
Kitson

General election 1892: Colne Valley
Party	Candidate	Votes	%	±%
Liberal	James Kitson	4,987	53.8	New
Liberal Unionist	John Sugden	4,281	46.2	N/A
Majority		706	7.6	N/A
Turnout		9,268	79.1	N/A
Registered electors		11,710		
Liberal gain from Liberal Unionist		Swing	N/A	

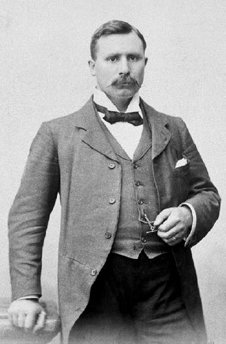
Mann

General election 1895: Colne Valley
Party	Candidate	Votes	%	±%
Liberal	James Kitson	4,276	46.2	−7.6
Conservative	Harold Thomas	3,737	40.4	−5.8
Ind. Labour Party	Tom Mann	1,245	13.4	New
Majority		539	5.8	−1.8
Turnout		9,258	86.4	+7.3
Registered electors		10,712		
Liberal hold		Swing	−0.9	

=== Elections in the 1900s ===
General election 1900: Colne Valley
Party	Candidate	Votes	%	±%
Liberal	James Kitson	4,699	52.9	+6.7
Conservative	W G Bagnall	4,176	47.1	+6.7
Majority		523	5.8	+0.0
Turnout		8,875	80.1	−6.3
Registered electors		11,081		
Liberal hold		Swing	+0.0	

General election 1906: Colne Valley
Party	Candidate	Votes	%	±%
Liberal	James Kitson	Unopposed		
Liberal hold				

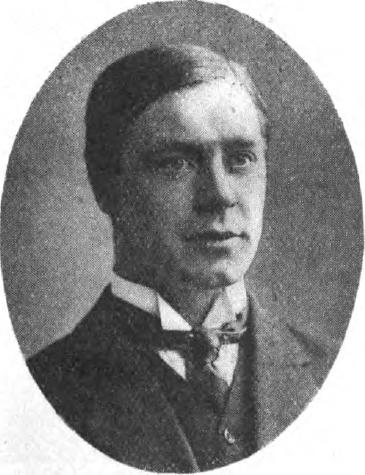
Grayson

1907 Colne Valley by-election
Party	Candidate	Votes	%	±%
Colne Valley Labour	Victor Grayson (Note: Grayson was a member of the ILP, but did not receive official endorsement from the national party. He was accepted as one of their MPs after his election in 1907 and receive a parliamentary allowance however.)	3,648	35.2	New
Liberal	Philip Bright	3,495	33.7	N/A
Conservative	Granville Wheler	3,227	31.1	New
Majority		153	1.5	N/A
Turnout		10,370	88.1	N/A
Registered electors		11,771		
Ind. Labour Party gain from Liberal		Swing	N/A	

=== Elections in the 1910s ===
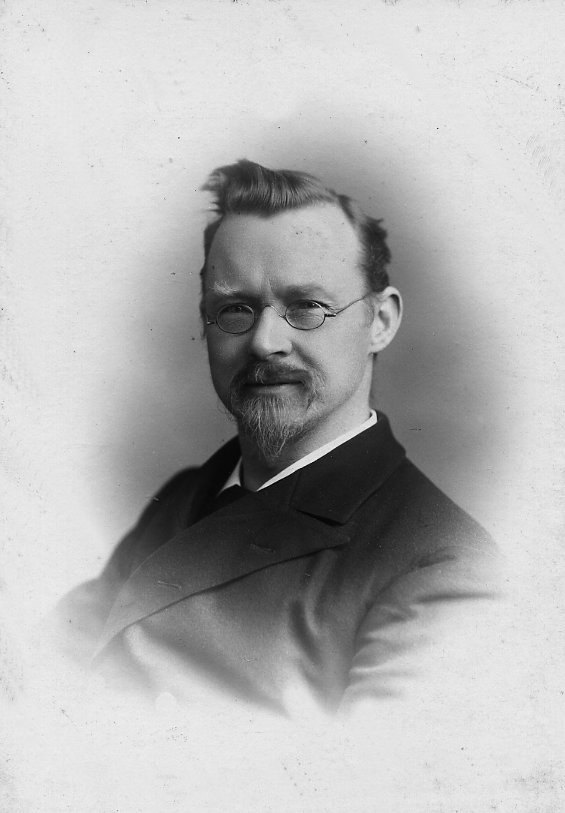
Leach

General election January 1910: Colne Valley
Party	Candidate	Votes	%	±%
Liberal	Charles Leach	4,741	40.7	+7.0
Conservative	Archibald Boyd-Carpenter	3,750	32.2	+1.1
Colne Valley Labour	Victor Grayson	3,149	27.1	−8.1
Majority		991	8.5	N/A
Turnout		11,640	93.2	+5.1
Registered electors		12,489		
Liberal gain from Ind. Labour Party		Swing	+7.6	

General election December 1910: Colne Valley
Party	Candidate	Votes	%	±%
Liberal	Charles Leach	5,147	51.5	+10.8
Conservative	Archibald Boyd-Carpenter	4,847	48.5	+16.3
Majority		300	3.0	−5.5
Turnout		9,994	80.0	−13.2
Registered electors		12,489		
Liberal hold		Swing	−2.8	

General Election 1914–15:

Another General Election was required to take place before the end of 1915. The political parties had been making preparations for an election to take place and by the July 1914, the following candidates had been selected;

- Liberal: Charles Leach
- Unionist: Archibald Boyd-Carpenter
- Labour:

1916 Colne Valley by-election
Party	Candidate	Votes	%	±%
Liberal	Frederick Mallalieu	Unopposed		
Liberal hold				

== See also ==
- List of parliamentary constituencies in West Yorkshire
- List of parliamentary constituencies in the Yorkshire and the Humber (region)
