= Estimate Audit Committees =

The Estimate Audit Committees is a group of two select committees of the House of Commons in the Parliament of the United Kingdom. It has a remit to support the Clerk of the House of Commons and the Accounting Officer of the House of Commons.

== Membership ==
As of 20 March 2019, the members of the committee are as follows:

Member	Party	Constituency
Dr. Rima Makarem	N/A	N/A
Sir Paul Beresford MP	Conservative	Mole Valley
Clive Betts MP	Labour	Sheffield South East
Rt. Hon. Tom Brake PC MP	Liberal Democrats	Carshalton and Wallington
Jane McCall	N/A	N/A
Bob Scruton	N/A	N/A

== See also ==
- Parliamentary committees of the United Kingdom
- Select committee (United Kingdom)
