= Richard Cornthwaite Lambert =

British barrister and Liberal Party politician

R.C. Lambert, circa 1910.

Richard Cornthwaite Lambert (5 May 1868 – 5 November 1939) was a British barrister and Liberal Party politician.

== Early life ==
The son of the Rev. Richard Umfraville Lambert, vicar of Christ Church, Bradford on Avon, Somerset and his wife Agnes née Stanton, he was born at Wells, County Carlow. He was educated at Shrewsbury School, and matriculated in 1866 at Trinity College, Cambridge, graduating B.A. with honours in history in 1889, M.A. in 1926.

He travelled widely in Europe and the Middle East before being called to the bar at the Inner Temple in 1892. He practised law on the Midland Circuit. In 1893 he married Lilian Burman of Four Oaks, Warwickshire, with whom he had 3 children. One of his sons was Richard S. Lambert, who was to become editor of The Listener.

== Political career ==
He joined the Liberal Party. He sat on the Executive Committee of the London Liberal Federation. He stood as a Liberal candidate at Sheffield Ecclesall in 1906, at Sheffield Attercliffe at a by-election in 1909, and Portsmouth in January 1910.

In 1907 he attempted to win a London County Council seat at West Islington for the Liberal-backed Progressive Party but was unsuccessful. However, in March 1910 he was elected to the London County Council at the second attempt;

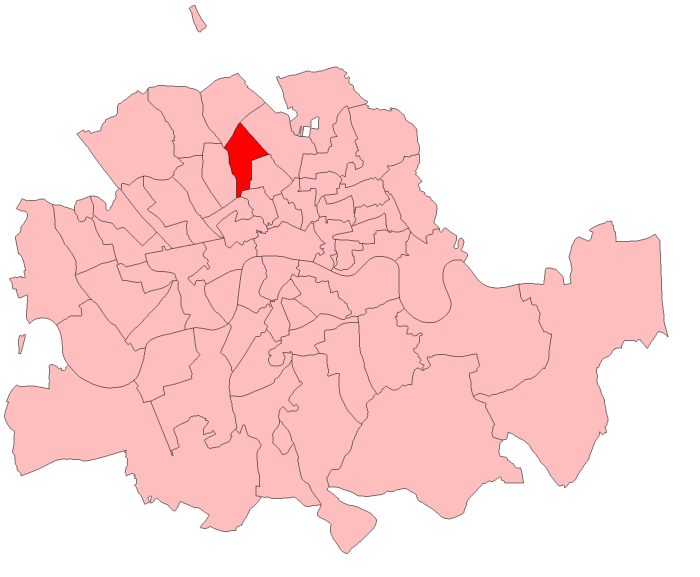
Islington West in the metropolitan area, 1885–1918

He was elected to the House of Commons as Member of Parliament (MP) for Cricklade at the general election in December 1910,

In 1913 he stood down from the London County Council. He was a pacifist. During the Great War he opposed the introduction of conscription into the armed services. He joined the Union of Democratic Control, a group of Liberal and Labour MPs who opposed military influence in government. In 1917 he wrote and had published 'The Parliamentary History of Conscription in Great Britain'. In 1918 he joined the Labour Party. The Cricklade constituency was abolished at the 1918 general election, and Lambert did not stand for Parliament again.

In 1922 he became librarian at the Athenaeum Club, London, holding the post until 1935.

=== Election results ===
General election 1906: Sheffield Ecclesall
Party	Candidate	Votes	%	±%
Conservative	Samuel Roberts	5,856	52.1	−8.9
Liberal	Richard Lambert	5,392	47.9	+8.9
Majority		464	4.2	−17.8
Turnout			87.1	+14.1
Conservative hold		Swing		

1909 Sheffield Attercliffe by-election
Party	Candidate	Votes	%	±%
Labour	Joseph Pointer	3,531	27.5	N/A
Conservative	Sydney Charles King-Farlow	3,380	26.2	−20.6
Liberal	Richard Lambert	3,175	24.6	−28.6
Ind. Conservative	Arnold Muir Wilson	2,803	21.7	N/A
Majority		151	1.3	−5.1
Turnout			77.3	−1.9
Labour gain from Liberal		Swing	N/A	

General election January 1910: Portsmouth (2 seats)
Party	Candidate	Votes	%	±%
Conservative	✓ Charles Beresford	16,777	28.80	N/A
Liberal Unionist	✓ Bertram Falle	15,592	26.76	N/A
Liberal	Thomas Bramsdon	12,397	21.28	−1.31
Liberal	Richard Lambert	9,965	17.10	N/A
Labour	William Sanders	3,529	6.06	−11.52
Turnout		58,260 (30,100 voted)	89.41	+6.59

London County Council election, 1910: Islington West
Party	Candidate	Votes	%	±%
Progressive	✓ Richard Lambert	3,193		
Progressive	✓ Henry Lorenzo Jephson	3,172		
Municipal Reform	H J Clarke	2,542		
Municipal Reform	F Russell Davies	2,524		
Majority				
Progressive gain from Municipal Reform		Swing		
Progressive gain from Municipal Reform		Swing		

General election December 1910: Cricklade
Party	Candidate	Votes	%	±%
Liberal	Richard Lambert	6,937	50.5	+2.7
Liberal Unionist	Thomas Calley	6,809	49.5	−2.7
Majority		128	1.0	5.4
Turnout			90.4	
Liberal gain from Liberal Unionist		Swing	+2.7	

Parliament of the United Kingdom
Preceded by Thomas Calley	Member of Parliament for Cricklade; December 1910 – 1918	Constituency abolished
