= 1963 Colne Valley by-election =

UK parliamentary by-election

The 1963 Colne Valley by-election was a parliamentary by-election for the British House of Commons constituency of Colne Valley on 21 March 1963.

== Vacancy ==
The by-election was caused by the death of the sitting Labour MP, Glenvil Hall, on 13 October 1962. He had held the seat since a 1939 by-election.

== Election history ==
Colne Valley had been won by Labour at every election since 1935, when they had gained the seat from the Liberals. The result at the previous general election was as follows;

General election 1959: Colne Valley
Party	Candidate	Votes	%	±%
Labour	Glenvil Hall	19,284	44.3	−9.9
Conservative	Christopher J. Barr	13,030	29.9	−15.9
Liberal	Richard Wainwright	11,254	25.8	New
Majority		6,254	14.4	+6.0
Turnout		43,568	84.1	
Labour hold		Swing		

== Candidates ==
Labour selected 43-year-old Patrick Duffy. He had contested Tiverton in 1950, 1951 and 1955. Duffy was a lecturer at Leeds University from 1950 to 1963, who had been educated at the London School of Economics and Columbia University, New York City.

The Conservatives selected 28-year-old outsider, Andrew Alexander, a journalist and leader writer. Alexander was educated at Lancing College, and a former member of Dorchester Borough Council. He was a past chairman of North Kensington Young Conservatives and Dorchester Young Conservatives.

The Liberals re-selected 44-year-old Leeds man Richard Wainwright. He had contested Pudsey in 1950 and 1955 and Colne Valley in 1959. Wainwright was a chartered accountant, educated at Shrewsbury School and Clare College, Cambridge. He was a Member of the Liberal Party Committee and Council, and chairman of the Liberal Party Organization Department from 1955 to 1957.

An independent candidate, Arthur Fox, also stood. He was well-known as the owner of the "Revue Bar", a Manchester striptease club and an author on the subject.

A total of 174 people serving in the Armed Forces applied for nomination papers to stand in the election, to avail of the automatic military discharge for Parliamentary candidates publicised by Malcolm Thompson at the 1962 Middlesbrough West by-election. Whereas Thompson's name had appeared on the ballot paper, by 1963 it was widely known that merely applying for papers sufficed for a discharge, without needing to submit the papers or pay an electoral deposit. The military rules for election discharge were tightened after the following week's Rotherham by-election.

== Campaign ==
The election campaign was a long one, with polling day not taking place until five months after the death of the previous MP.

The main themes of Wainwright's Liberal campaign were State Pensions being tied to the cost of living index, creating a new Ministry of Employment, and no more nationalisation.

== Result ==
The Labour vote share held up, while the Liberals gained support at the expense of the Conservatives. Significantly, Wainwright had managed to push the Conservative candidate into third place.

Colne Valley by-election, 1963 (Electorate 51,397)
Party	Candidate	Votes	%	±%
Labour	Patrick Duffy	18,033	44.5	+0.2
Liberal	Richard Wainwright	15,994	39.5	+13.7
Conservative	Andrew Alexander	6,238	15.4	−14.5
Independent	Arthur Fox	266	0.6	New
Majority		2,039	5.0	−9.4
Turnout		40,531	78.9	−5.2
Labour hold		Swing	-6.8	

== Aftermath ==
All three main party candidates did battle again at the following general election. Wainwright further closed the gap on the Labour Party. The result at the 1964 general election was;

General election 1964 (Electorate 52,006)
Party	Candidate	Votes	%	±%
Labour	Patrick Duffy	18,537	42.0	−2.5
Liberal	Richard Wainwright	18,350	41.6	+2.1
Conservative	Andrew Alexander	7,207	16.3	+0.9
Majority		187	0.4	−4.6
Turnout		44,094	84.8	+5.3
Labour hold		Swing	-2.3	

Wainwright eventually defeated Duffy at the 1966 general election, but was himself defeated in the 1970 general election before regaining it in February 1974, subsequently holding it until his retirement in 1987. Duffy went on to become the MP for Sheffield Attercliffe, serving from 1970 to 1992.

== Bibliography ==
- Who's Who: www.ukwhoswho.com
- By-Elections in British Politics by Cook and Ramsden
- Wainwright's election material: https://web.archive.org/web/20120507020835/http://www.by-elections.co.uk/colne63/Liberal.html

== See also ==
- List of United Kingdom by-elections
- United Kingdom by-election records
