= 1944 Sheffield Attercliffe by-election =

UK Parliamentary by-election

The 1944 by-election for the British constituency of Sheffield Attercliffe was held on 21 February 1944. It was held due to the resignation of the incumbent Labour MP, Cecil Wilson, and was won by the unopposed Labour candidate John Hynd.
