= 1909 Sheffield Attercliffe by-election =

UK parliamentary by-election

- 4 May 1909

Candidate	Pointer	King-Farlow	Lambert
Party	Labour	Conservative	Liberal
Popular vote	3,531	3,380	3,175
Percentage	27.5%	26.2%	24.6%
Candidate	Wilson
Party	Ind. Conservative
Popular vote	2,803
Percentage	21.7%
MP before election
J. Batty Langley
Liberal
Subsequent MP
Joseph Pointer
Labour

A 1909 by-election was held for the British House of Commons constituency of Sheffield Attercliffe on 4 May 1909.

== Vacancy ==
The election was caused by the resignation of J. Batty Langley, due to long-term ill health. He had been the Liberal Party Member of Parliament for the seat since an 1894 by-election.

== Electoral history ==
Batty Langley had been re-elected unopposed at the 1895 and 1900 general elections. Arnold Muir Wilson, a local Conservative Party councillor and honorary consul for Serbia had contested the seat in 1906, taking 46.8% of the vote.

Batty Langley

General election 1906: Sheffield Attercliffe
Party	Candidate	Votes	%	±%
Liberal	J. Batty Langley	6,523	53.2	N/A
Conservative	Arnold Muir Wilson	5,736	46.8	New
Majority		787	6.4	N/A
Turnout		12,259	79.2	N/A
Liberal hold		Swing	N/A	

== Background ==
Attercliffe, a district of north east Sheffield, was a heavy industry, working class area. At the time of the election, there was extremely high unemployment in the area.

== Candidates ==
R.C. Lambert

The Liberal Party approached Arthur Neal, then a local councillor, but he declined nomination. Only one candidate then put themselves forward for nomination: Richard Cornthwaite Lambert, a London-based barrister who had narrowly failed to win Sheffield Ecclesall at the 1906 election.

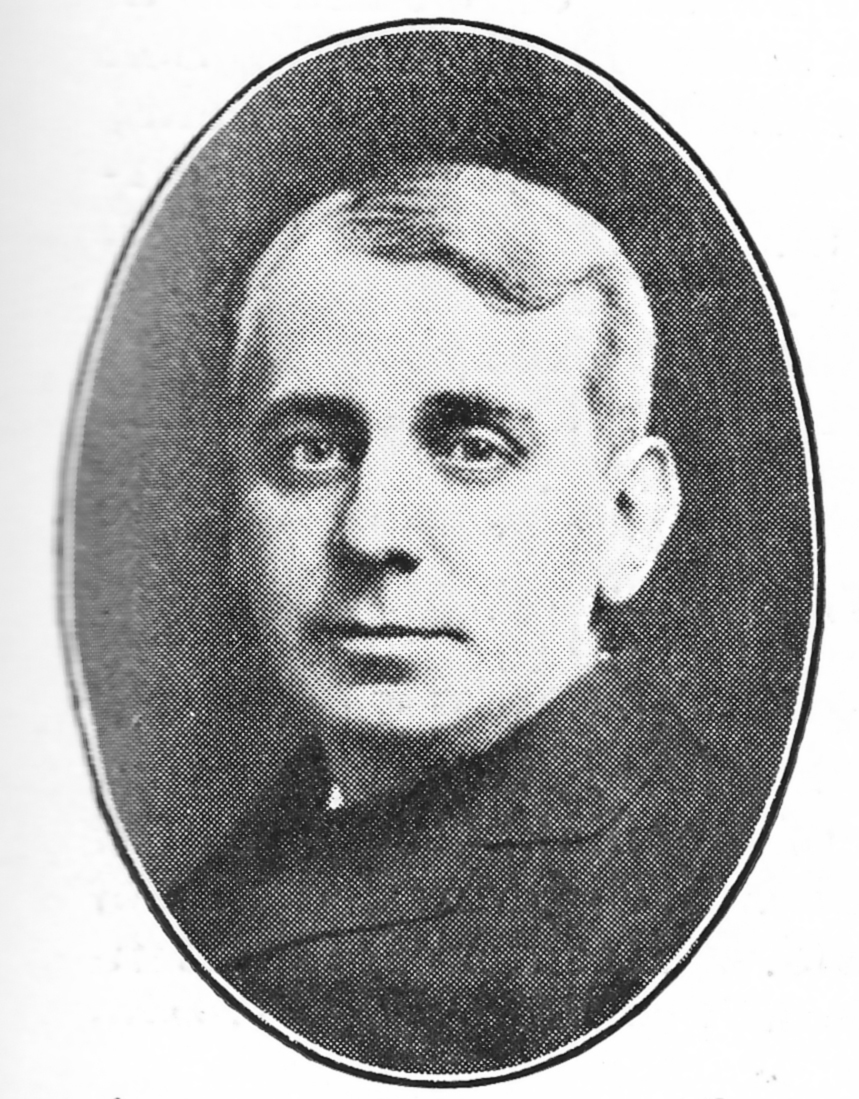
Muir Wilson

As Muir Wilson, the Conservative candidate last time, was out of the country, the Conservatives nominated a new candidate, Sydney Charles King-Farlow. A newcomer to politics, he was a barrister based in the south east of England. Wilson objected to the decision to stand an outsider, and decided to stand as an independent candidate. He was adopted by an unofficial panel of Conservative Party members, and offered to withdraw if the party apologised to him, withdrew King-Farlow and instead adopted a candidate of his choice. This offer was not accepted.

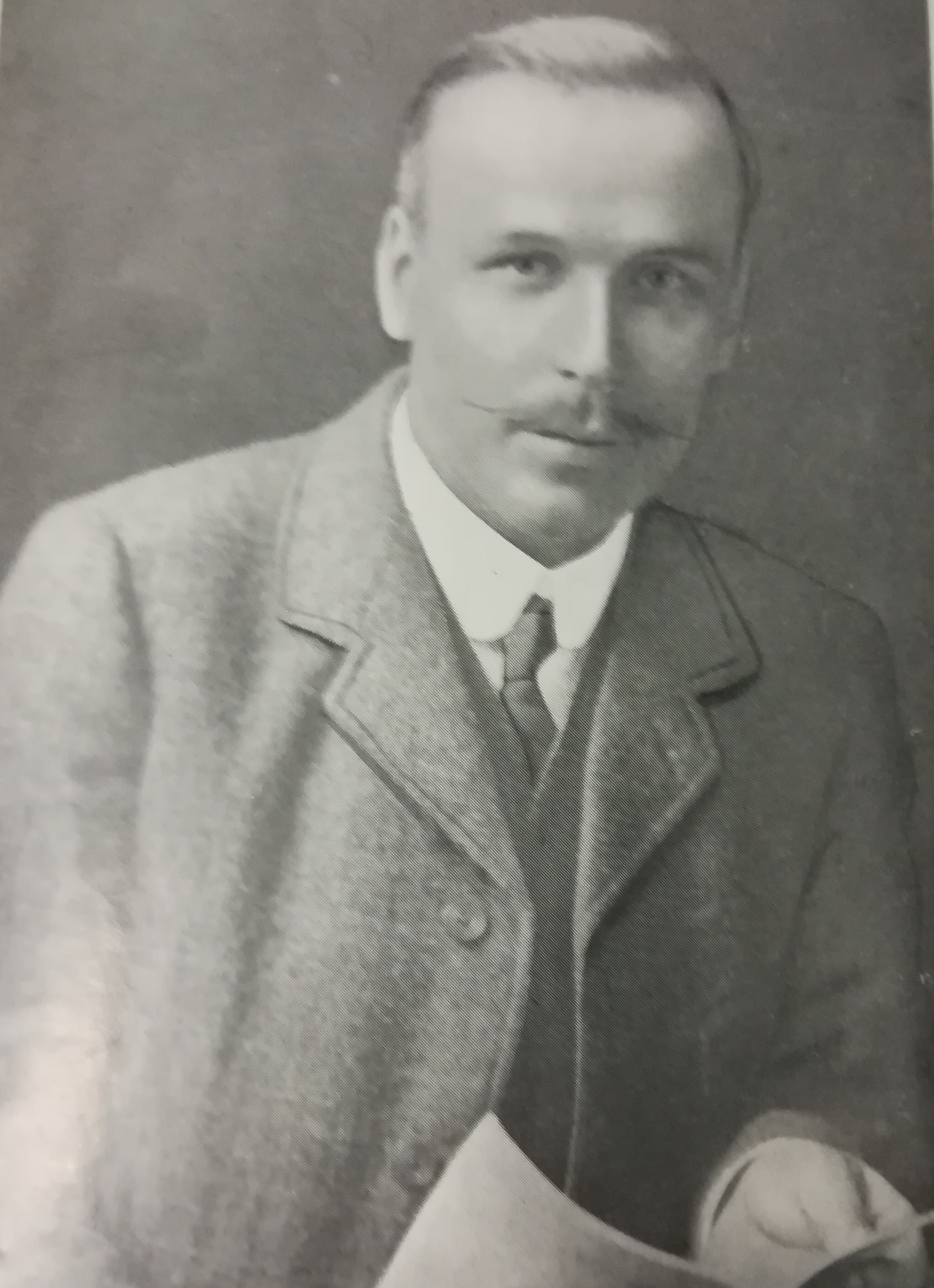
Joseph Pointer

The Labour Party asked President of the Yorkshire Miners' Association Herbert Smith to stand, but he declined. Instead, they stood Joseph Pointer, Chair of Sheffield Trades Council and a local councillor. He was a member of the Independent Labour Party and the United Patternmakers Association, but both organisations initially refused to sponsor his candidacy, the Patternmakers finally agreeing on 20 April to finance him.

== Campaign ==
The campaign was short, but hard-fought. Lambert campaigned as "the People's Candidate", opposing taxes on food. He described himself as a radical, and announced that he would not say a word of apology or in defence of the government, but that its conduct had been admirable.

Muir Wilson stood on a protectionist platform, under the slogan "Vote for the Tory Chicken!! Kill the London Cuckoo!!". Surprisingly for a Conservative, he called for the redistribution of wealth and the nationalisation of railways and collieries. King-Farlow promised "more work for Englishmen and less work for foreigners". The two engaged in a widely discussed dispute, Muir Wilson writing to King-Farlow "I think you have found out by now how you have been fooled and betrayed, so you have better throw the sponge up and return to London". The two held rival meetings a few feet apart in Heeley, and Muir Wilson attacked local Conservative MP Samuel Roberts for appearing on King-Farlow's platform. Roberts called Muir Wilson a "mountebank", but subsequently suggested that the party should withdraw their candidate and apologise to Muir Wilson. Other Tories advocated both candidates standing down in favour of Fred Kelley, a local brewer, but he stated that he would not stand even if asked.

Ramsay MacDonald, Keir Hardie and Arthur Henderson, among others, came to campaign for Pointer. His campaign was criticised for being poorly organised, and suffered from a lack of resources, being largely based on open air speeches.

At the end of April, Captain Hunnable, an eccentric poet from Ilford, arrived in the constituency, promising to raise wages to £2 a week and form a government within five years. He considered supporting Muir Wilson, but rejected the idea after a meeting. He briefly attempted to stand as a fifth candidate, but gave up after he divined a horoscope stating that Muir Wilson would win.

The Women's Social and Political Union intervened in the election, with Emmeline Pankhurst speaking. The organisation was broadly sympathetic to the Labour Party, but all four candidates endorsed women's suffrage. However, they were pelted with rotten eggs and vegetables during at least one open-air meeting, and appealed for police protection. During the campaign, they collected 5,000 signatures from local voters to a petition to enfranchise women.

The Manchester Guardian predicted that Lambert would win easily, taking at least 5,000 votes, with eight or nine thousand shared between the other three candidates.

== Result ==
The result was announced on a large illuminated screen at Sheffield Town Hall, and a big crowd awaited the result of the contest. With the Conservative vote split, Pointer was able to take enough votes from the Liberals to achieve a narrow victory, with the Liberals dropping from first to third place. With only 27.5% of the vote, this remains the lowest ever winning share in a single-member by-election. At the time, the possibility of winning a seat with such a low share of the vote was described by the Daily Chronicle as an "absurdity", making the case for preferential voting. The Labour gain, and the dramatic fall in the Liberal vote, encouraged David Lloyd George to move the party to the left, and the next months saw a series of large Liberal victories in their safe seats. On 22 May, Winston Churchill spoke in favour of the introduction of proportional representation, claiming that "the present system has clearly broken down. The results produced are not fair to any party... all they secure is fluke representation".

Immediately after the announcement, Muir Wilson thanked Pointer and Lambert, but accused King-Farlow of being "warped by the prejudice of others". Later in the evening, King-Farlow confronted him, calling him a "cad and a liar", and the two Conservatives had to be separated. The following week, Muir Wilson called a public meeting, at which he complained that he had spent £1,100 on contesting the 1906 and 1909 elections, and "if that is not enough to buy the seat of Attercliffe, I don't know what is". Later in the month, he sued King-Farlow for assault on the election night, and for damage to his bowler hat. The case was dismissed before Muir Wilson was able to give evidence.

Sheffield Attercliffe by-election, 1909
Party	Candidate	Votes	%	±%
Labour	Joseph Pointer	3,531	27.5	New
Conservative	Sydney Charles King-Farlow	3,380	26.2	−20.6
Liberal	Richard Cornthwaite Lambert	3,175	24.6	−28.6
Ind. Conservative	Arnold Muir Wilson	2,803	21.7	New
Majority		151	1.3	N/A
Turnout		12,889	77.3	−1.9
Labour gain from Liberal		Swing		

== Aftermath ==
Pointer held the seat until his death in 1914. Lambert finally won a seat at Cricklade in 1910. Wilson died a few months after the by-election, without ever having returned to the UK. King-Farlow contested the seat again in January 1910, then stood in Hackney South in December, but was never elected, and instead became a judge in British East Africa.

General election January 1910: Sheffield Attercliffe
Party	Candidate	Votes	%	±%
Labour	Joseph Pointer	7,755	56.1	+28.6
Conservative	Sydney Charles King-Farlow	6,075	43.9	+17.7
Majority		1,676	12.2	+10.9
Turnout		13,834	83.9	+6.6
Registered electors		16,483		
Labour hold		Swing	+5.45	

== See also ==
1894 Sheffield Attercliffe by-election
