= Andrew Alexander =

Andrew Alexander may refer to:

- Andrew Alexander (producer) (born 1944), theatre, film and television producer
- Andrew Alexander (actor), English actor
- Andrew Alexander (journalist) (1935–2015), English journalist
- Lamar Alexander (born Andrew Lamar Alexander Jr.; 1940), American politician
