= Arthur Hunnable =

British poet

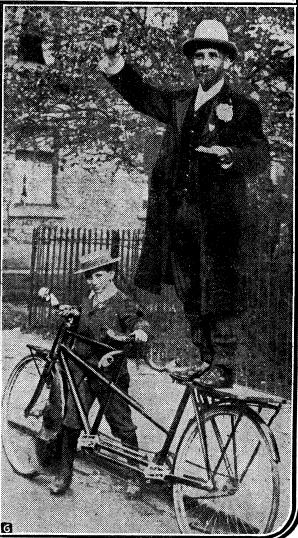
Hunnable speaks in the Newcastle by-election of 1908 on his "travelling platform", held steady by his son.

Arthur Hunnable (1863–1925), often known as Captain Hunnable, was a British poet and minor fraudster, best known for his frequent but unsuccessful attempts to become a candidate for election to Parliament.

Hunnable was born in Braintree, Essex, to Thomas and Jane Hunnable.

Living in Ilford, Hunnable worked as a bicycle and tool maker and motor engineer until March 1907. He first came to public attention at the Jarrow by-election that summer, before which he spoke widely in the town, announcing that he intended to stand as a candidate. He was nominated, but failed to deliver a £200 deposit, as required, and despite his protests, was not permitted to stand. Despite this, he continued to give popular speeches, and the Mayor of Jarrow declared that "he keeps the young and the rough element amused". Following the election, Hunnable appeared at the Empire Music Hall in Holborn in a skit reliving parts of his campaign. After a week, he quit, to speak in the run-up to the Colne Valley by-election, then moved on to the North West Staffordshire by-election. However, he did not attempt to stand, announcing that he had decided to stand at Jarrow in the next general election. He proved less popular in Staffordshire, and was fined for causing an obstruction in Hanley Market Square, and describing any hecklers as "dirty little tykes". Unable to pay the £3 demanded, he was imprisoned for a month, but was released after three days, a public subscription having raised the sum.

Hunnable next tried to stand at the Liverpool Kirkdale by-election, but announced immediately before nominations closed that all twelve of his nomination papers had been incorrectly completed, so he could not continue with his candidacy. He also spoke at the 1908 Peckham by-election, and at the North West Manchester by-election, he spoke in favour of the Conservative Party candidate William Joynson-Hicks. During the election, a carriage in which he was riding, decked out in the Conservative colours, ran into a crowd of Liberal Party supporters, and the vehicle was overturned before he made his escape.

Hunnable was known for his flamboyant style, sometimes bowing from his carriage to imaginary cheers, and lively meetings - he claimed by the end of 1909 to have given a "good hiding" to thirty-seven hecklers. He frequently employed poetry, which was widely considered of a low standard. He claimed to have schemes which would make the fortunes of those who voted for him, introduce a £2 minimum wage, reform the British Empire. At Attercliffe in 1909, he claimed that he would be forming a government within five years. He wore a frock coat, kid boots with pointed toes and a wide-awake hat.

In May 1908, Hunnable was fined £3, a guinea and costs for unlawfully leaving a donkey and cart in Romford Market and then assaulting a market employee. This did not stop him from appearing at the Wolverhampton East by-election, and speaking in Manchester on the topic of the "Social Reform Progress League" which he had supposedly founded. He announced that he would run in the Pudsey by-election, but again failed to stand. In August, he was gaoled for five weeks for failing to pay the fines imposed in May.

Hunnable re-emerged at the 1909 Sheffield Attercliffe by-election, at which he met with independent Conservative candidate Arnold Muir Wilson, but decided against supporting him until he divined a horoscope stating that Muir Wilson would win. At the end of the summer, he spoke on the beach at Blackpool, but was fined 10 shillings for knocking out a heckler. The press gradually lost interest in his activities, but by 1913, when he was fined for failing to send his daughter to school, he was the editor of his own newspaper, the People's Parliament. He moved to Newcastle-upon-Tyne, where he claimed to have invented an unsinkable ship and a new form of airship. He attempted to stand as an independent labour candidate in Jarrow at the 1918 general election. In 1921, he was again gaoled, this time for fraud, having purchased a bicycle with a worthless cheque.

He died in Essex in 1925.
