= Ernest Marklew =

British Labour Party politician

Ernest Marklew (16 April 1874 – 14 June 1939) was a British Labour Party politician.

Marklew worked as a fish merchant in Grimsby, and became active in the Labour Party. He was elected to Grimsby Borough Council in 1928, and also served on the executive of the Social Democratic Federation.

Marklew stood for the Labour Party in Grimsby at the 1929 United Kingdom general election, and then in Colne Valley at the 1931 United Kingdom general election. At the 1935 general election, he was elected in Colne Valley, defeating the sitting Liberal Party MP, Lance Mallalieu, by a majority of 3,779 votes.

He died in office in 1939 aged 65.

Parliament of the United Kingdom
| Preceded by Lance Mallalieu | Member of Parliament for Colne Valley; 1935–1939 | Succeeded by Glenvil Hall |
