= Glenvil Hall =

British politician (1887–1962)

Glenvil Hall PC
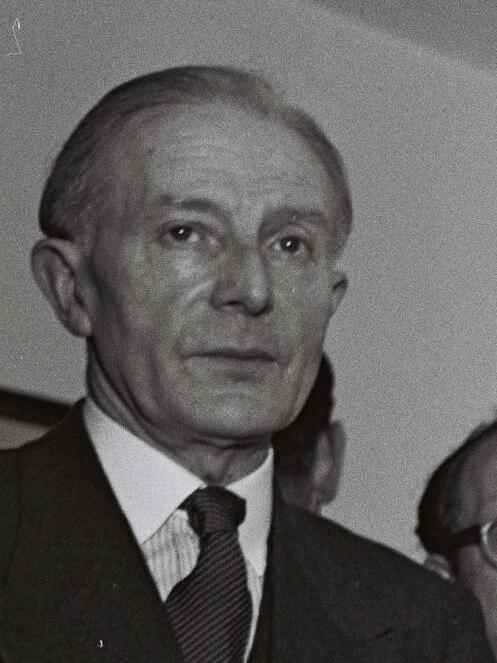
- Hall in 1951

Financial Secretary to the Treasury
- In office 4 August 1945 – 2 March 1950
- Prime Minister: Clement Attlee
- Preceded by: Osbert Peake
- Succeeded by: Douglas Jay

Member of Parliament for Colne Valley
- In office 27 July 1939 – 13 October 1962
- Preceded by: Ernest Marklew
- Succeeded by: Patrick Duffy

Member of Parliament for Portsmouth Central
- In office 30 May 1929 – 27 October 1931
- Preceded by: Harry Foster
- Succeeded by: Ralph Beaumont

Personal details
- Born: William George Glenvil Hall; 4 April 1887
- Died: 13 October 1962 (aged 75)
- Party: Labour
- Children: John Hall
- Occupation: Barrister

William George Glenvil Hall (4 April 1887 – 13 October 1962) was a British barrister and Labour politician.

== Political career ==
Hall was elected at the 1929 general election as Member of Parliament (MP) for Portsmouth Central, but lost his seat two years later at the 1931 election, when Labour split over the formation of the National Government. He returned to the House of Commons in 1939, at a by-election in the Colne Valley constituency, and held the seat until he died in office in 1962, aged 75. His son, John Hall, was a flying ace with the Royal Air Force during the Second World War, and went on to have prominent legal career in the postwar period.

In Clement Attlee's post-war government, Hall served as financial secretary to the Treasury from 1945 to 1950. He was made a privy councillor in 1947. After leaving government in 1950, he served as chair of the Parliamentary Labour Party (PLP)'s liaison committee, a position equivalent to the current role of Chairman of the PLP.

Hall served on the Board of Governors of the British Film Institute in the 1940s, prior to his appointment to the Attlee government.

Parliament of the United Kingdom
Preceded by Sir Harry Seymour Foster	Member of Parliament for Portsmouth Central; 1929–1931	Succeeded by Ralph Beaumont
Preceded by Ernest Marklew	Member of Parliament for Colne Valley; 1939–1962	Succeeded by Patrick Duffy
Political offices
Preceded by Osbert Peake	Financial Secretary to the Treasury; 1945–1950	Succeeded by Douglas Jay
