= J. Batty Langley =

British politician (1834–1914)

Member of Parliament for Sheffield Attercliffe
- In office 1894–1909
- Preceded by: Bernard Coleridge
- Succeeded by: Joseph Pointer

President of the National Association of General Railway Clerks
- In office 1897–1898
- Preceded by: New position
- Succeeded by: W. D. Leaver

Personal details
- Born: 20 March 1834 Uppingham, England
- Died: 19 February 1914 (aged 79) Bournemouth, England
- Resting place: Sheffield General Cemetery, England
- Party: Liberal Party

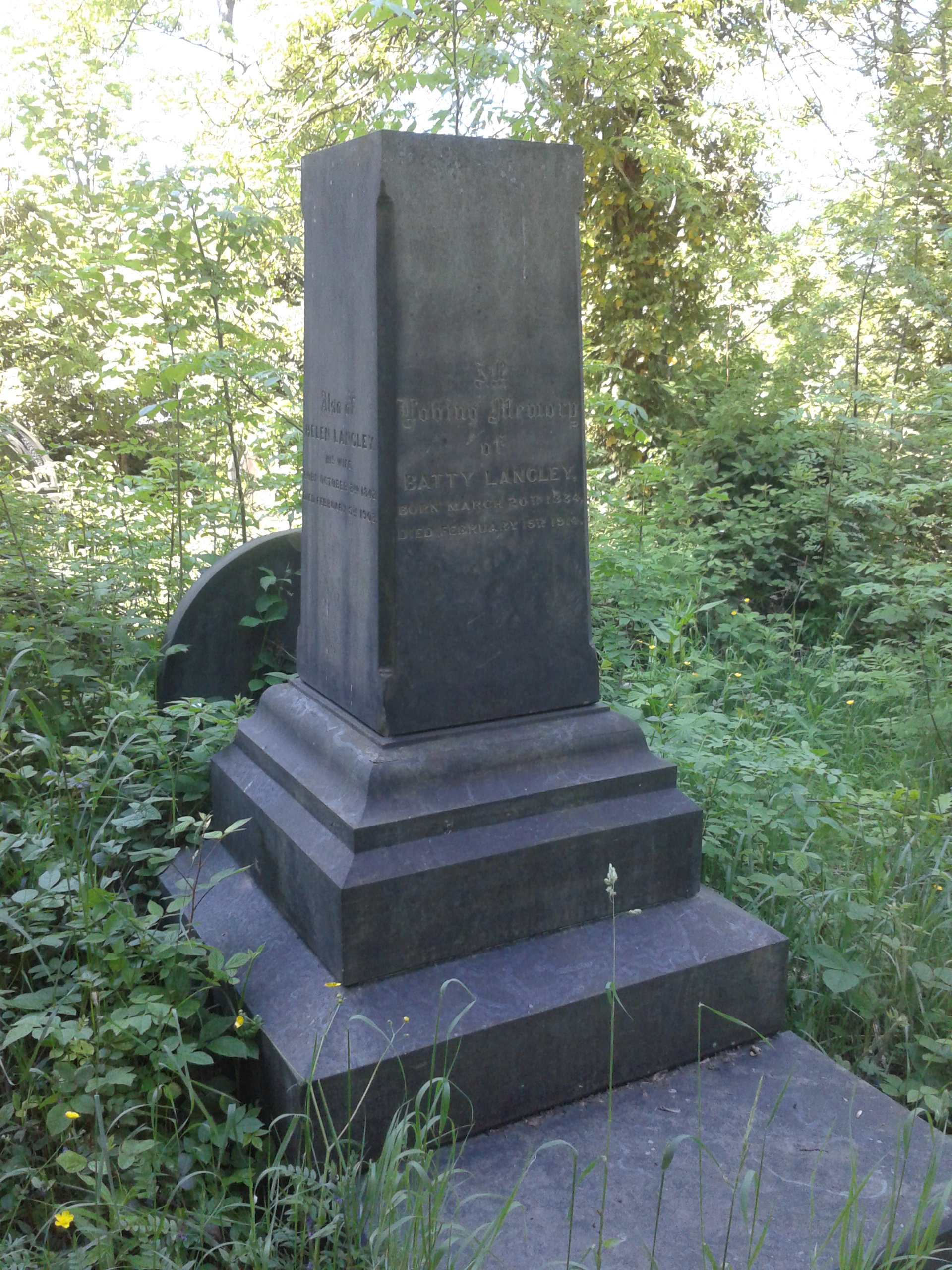
Grave of Batty Langley, in Sheffield General Cemetery

J. Batty Langley (20 March 1834 – 19 February 1914) was a British Liberal Party politician.

He was born in Uppingham, Rutland, the son of Thomas Langley. He moved to Sheffield in the 1850s, and in 1863 commenced business on his own account as a timber merchant and became proprietor of the Sheaf Saw Mills. He was one of the city's most prominent non-conformists, attending Queen Street Congregational Church. He was elected to Sheffield Town Council in 1871, serving many years and becoming an alderman in 1890.

In 1892, Langley became Mayor of Sheffield, and saw an eventful year in office. Sheffield became a city, while Langley organised a conference in the city, aiming to settle the 1893 coal strike.

Claiming to represent the interests of the working class, he was elected as the Member of Parliament at the 1894 Sheffield Attercliffe by-election. As an employer, he was a controversial choice, and the Independent Labour Party stood a candidate against him. He was re-elected for Sheffield Attercliffe unopposed at the 1895 and 1900 general elections but in 1906, the Conservative Arnold Muir Wilson stood. Langley retained his Parliamentary seat until he retired in 1909, due to long-term ill health.

Langley became the first president of the National Association of General Railway Clerks (now Transport Salaried Staffs' Association) in 1897, although he resigned due to ill health the following year.

Parliament of the United Kingdom
Preceded by Bernard Coleridge	Member of Parliament for Sheffield Attercliffe; 1894–1909	Succeeded by Joseph Pointer
Trade union offices
Preceded by New position	President of the General Union of Railway Clerks; 1897–1898	Succeeded by W. D. Leaver
