= Arthur Fox (nightclub owner) =

British producer and nightclub owner (1907-1970)

Arthur Fox (1907–1970) was a strip show producer and nightclub owner.

== Early life ==
Fox was the youngest of seven children: two of whom did not survive into adulthood. He won a governor's bursary to the Manchester Grammar School, and later studied for the College of Preceptors but ended up becoming Manchester's King of Glamour and Strip.

== Career ==
Before the war ended, Fox was producing revues, variety bills and plays. He had contracts with Marty Wilde, Wee Willie Harris and Terry Dene and he toured the entire country with a colourful stage version of the BBC's Six Five special.

By 1947, he was touring striptease shows across England. Shows such as Striptease Spectacular with Fraulein Von Manuela and Striptease Peep-show with Pauline Penny. In March 1959 he opened his own Revue Bar in George Street, Manchester. The club was known for its international talent, including American burlesque acts such as April March, The First Lady of Burlesque, Ricki Covette, The World's Tallest Glamazon, and Virginia “Ding Dong” Bell. He also ran the Glamour Cinema Club, which was next door to his George Street Revuebar.

His autobiography came out in 1962. It was published under two different titles: Striptease with the Lid Off and Striptease Business: the latter with four extra accompanying images. The publishing company Empso Ltd has the same business address as the Revue Bar. Striptease with the Lid Off was serialised in Manchester's Evening Chronicle, with the first instalment appearing on 19 July 1962.

In 1963, Fox stood for Parliament in the Colne Valley by-election as an independent candidate. He used two of his striptease stars in his campaign before the Home Office banned the tactic. He polled 266 votes and lost his deposit.

== Personal life ==
Fox married Sadie Libbert at the Manchester Reform Synagogue, Park Place Cheetham the day before it was blitzed in 1940. This marriage ended in divorce. Fox married his secretary, Madelaine, on 1 June 1940. She died in a collision involving a six-ton lorry in 1954.
