= 1914 Sheffield Attercliffe by-election =

UK Parliamentary by-election

The 1914 Sheffield Attercliffe by-election was held on 28 December 1914. The by-election was held due to the death of the incumbent Labour MP, Joseph Pointer. It was won by the Labour candidate William Crawford Anderson, who was elected unopposed.
