= John Hall (RAF officer) =

British flying ace of WWII

John Anthony Sanderson Hall
- Born: 25 December 1921; Oxford, England
- Died: 5 January 2004 (aged 82)
- Relatives: Glenvil Hall (father)
- Military career
- Allegiance: United Kingdom
- Branch: Royal Air Force
- Service years: 1940–1946
- Rank: Squadron Leader
- Units: No. 85 Squadron; No. 488 Squadron
- Conflicts: Second World War: The Blitz; invasion of Normandy
- Awards: Distinguished Flying Cross & Bar
- Other work: Queen's Counsel

John Hall, DFC & Bar, QC (25 December 1921 – 5 January 2004) was a British barrister and flying ace who served in the Royal Air Force (RAF) during the Second World War. He is credited with having shot down eight aircraft.

Born in Oxford, Hall was studying in France at the time of the outbreak of the Second World War. Returning to the United Kingdom, he joined the RAF in August 1940. Following the completion of his training, in January 1942 he was posted to No. 85 Squadron where he flew the Douglas A-20 Havoc night fighter for several months. He then performed instructing duties for a time before joining No. 488 Squadron, another night fighter unit. Flying the De Havilland Mosquito heavy fighter, he achieved several aerial victories from January 1944 through to March 1945.

Returning to civilian life after the war, he studied law and then became a barrister, establishing his own legal practice at the Bar. He was a prominent lawyer, becoming a Queen's Counsel in 1967 and later advising the financial services industry. He died in January 2004, aged 82.

== Early life ==
John Anthony Sanderson Hall was born on 25 December 1921 at Oxford, in England. His father was William Glenvil Hall, the member of parliament for Colne Valley and a future member of the post-war Labour government. He was educated at the Quaker Leighton Park School, and later studied at the Sorbonne in Paris and Cambridge University.

== Second World War ==
Following the outbreak of the Second World War, Hall returned to the United Kingdom. He joined the Royal Air Force (RAF) in August 1940 and, after completing his training, was commissioned as a pilot officer on probation on 20 September 1941. He proceeded to No. 51 Operational Training Unit (OTU) at Cranfield the following month, and in January 1942 was posted to No. 85 Squadron. This was equipped with the Douglas A-20 Havoc night fighter, flying from Hunsdon. Patrolling over the North Sea to intercept German bombers approaching the United Kingdom, the unit saw little success. Later in the year it converted to the De Havilland Mosquito heavy fighter. It soon switched to offensive operations, flying intruder missions to German-occupied Europe.

Hall, paired with Pilot Officer William Skelton as his radar operator, served with No. 85 Squadron until April 1943. During his time there he was confirmed in his rank as a pilot officer and received a war substantive promotion to flying officer. His next posting was to the Central Gunnery School at Sutton Bridge for a training course. As a result of his good performance there Hall returned to No. 51 OTU as an instructor the following month. He was promoted to flight lieutenant on 20 September.

=== Service with No. 488 Squadron ===
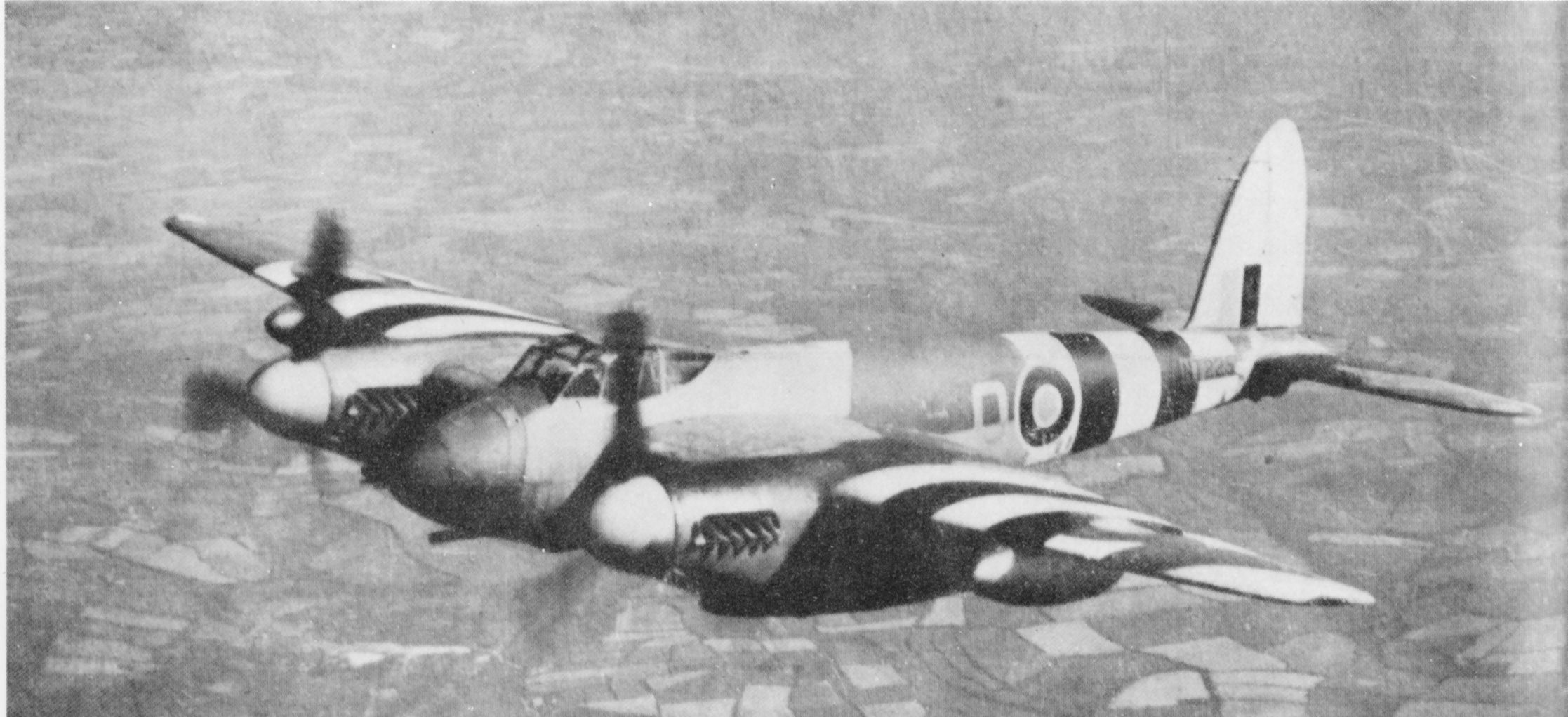
A de Havilland Mosquito heavy fighter

In late October Hall joined No. 488 Squadron, which operated Mosquito night fighters from Bradwell Bay in Essex. Here he was paired with Pilot Officer Jock Cairns as his radar operator. On the night of 21 January 1944, the Luftwaffe commenced Operation Steinbock, a raid on England involving over 400 bombers. Patrolling near Dungeness, Hall and Cairns, With the assistance of radar, intercepted a Dornier Do 17 medium bomber heading for London. He destroyed the Do 17, the wreckage of the bomber going down into the sea. Two of its crew survived. On the return to Bradwell Bay, Hall spotted a bomber that was caught in searchlights. He shot down this aircraft, a Junkers Ju 88 medium bomber, near Sellindge in Kent. This was the first time a No. 488 Squadron crew had shot down two aircraft in a single sortie and the feat was reported in a number of newspapers. Hall was also interviewed for BBC Radio.

While patrolling over Essex on the night of 21 March Hall shot down a Ju 88, the aircraft crashing onto an airfield at Earls Colne. The resulting explosion damaged a few nearby bombers of the United States Ninth Air Force. Another Ju 88 was destroyed by Hall, this time just off the Essex coast, on 19 April. Hall and Cairns combined to shoot down a Junkers Ju 188 medium bomber to the northeast of Exeter in the early hours of 15 May, with two of its crew surviving. Hall and Cairns were subsequently awarded the Distinguished Flying Cross (DFC). The citation for Hall's DFC, published in the London Gazette, read:

Flight Lieutenant Hall is a highly efficient and courageous fighter. He has completed a large number of sorties and has invariably displayed notable keenness and devotion to duty. He has shot down 4 hostile aircraft at night.

— London Gazette, No. 36555, 9 June 1944

Prior to the invasion of Normandy, No. 488 Squadron came under the control of the Second Tactical Air Force. On the night of 5/6 June, it was tasked with patrolling the skies over the landing beaches. Hall and Cairns flew one patrol in the early hours of D-Day but saw no German activity. Following the establishment of the Allied beachhead at Normandy, No. 488 Squadron switched to offensive operations, operating from the permanent RAF station at Zeals, in Wiltshire. The squadron patrolled over the beachhead protecting the land forces from night attacks mounted by German bombers but also carrying out intruder missions, seeking targets of opportunity such as transport vehicles and German aircraft. On the night of 14 August, Hall destroyed a Ju 88 to the southwest of Caen. He had intercepted another German bomber earlier in the sortie but it evaded his attempt to shoot it down. The aircraft that he did destroy was the 50th success for No. 488 Squadron.

Now operating from an airfield in France, No. 488 Squadron spent the final days of 1944 patrolling over Belgium and Holland. Hall destroyed a Messerschmitt Me 410 heavy fighter on the night of 23 December over the American front-lines. Returning from a sortie two days later, poor weather prevented him from landing at the squadron's airfield. He was diverted to an alternative airstrip but ended up crash landing his Mosquito.

On 27 March 1945 Hall destroyed a Ju 88 north of Emmerich, in Germany. One of the engines of his Mosquito was damaged by debris from the aircraft he had just destroyed. Although he was able to return to his squadron's airfield in Holland, he had perform another crash landing. He and Cairns were awarded Bars to their DFCs in May. The published citation for Hall's Bar read:

This officer continues to show the greatest keenness and, in various sorties, has inflicted much loss on the enemy. Among his achievements is the destruction of 8 enemy aircraft at night. On the last occasion, in March, 1945, Flight Lieutenant Hall pressed home his successful attack from such close range that his own aircraft was badly damaged by flying debris. Nevertheless, he flew back to base and landed safely. This officer has displayed high qualities of skill and courage.

— London Gazette, No. 37070, 8 May 1945

Hall ended the war credited with having shot down eight aircraft. He briefly served as the mayor of Gütersloh, and subsequently served in the British Air Forces of Occupation Communications Wing. Promoted to squadron leader, he commanded an armament practice camp at Sylt from October 1945 to August 1946. A posting to the headquarters of No. 2 Group followed. He then briefly served with No. 4 Squadron before he was released from the RAF in late 1946.

== Later life ==
Returning to civilian life, Hall, who had married Lola Crowe in 1945, commenced studying law at Trinity Hall, Cambridge, and was admitted to the bar in late 1948. He established his practice as a barrister, specialising in common and commercial law, in London and became a Queen's Counsel in 1967. A bencher in the Inner Temple from 1975, he was a prominent member of the legal profession and involved in several legal associations and bodies, both in the United Kingdom and in Europe. His marriage to Lola Crowe ended in 1974, by which time the couple had three children. He remarried two years later, to Elizabeth Maynard.

For a number of years Hall served as a governor at St Catherine's School, in Bramley, and one of its facilities was named for him. In his later years he worked as an arbitrator in the financial services industry. Hall died on 5 January 2004 at the age of 82. His sister wrote a biography of him that was published the following year.
