= Cecil Pike =

British politician (1898–1968)

Cecil Frederick Pike (26 February 1898 – 12 May 1968) was a British politician.

Born in Bromley, Kent, Pike joined the Conservative Party after studying at Owens College in Manchester. He stood unsuccessfully for the party in Rother Valley at the 1929 general election. He moved to contest Sheffield Attercliffe at the 1931 election. Although this was usually a safe Labour Party seat, he was able to win by just 165 votes. He was heavily defeated at the 1935 election, and was also unsuccessful at the 1939 Colne Valley by-election. Pike died in Chesterfield, Derbyshire aged 70.

Parliament of the United Kingdom
Preceded by Cecil Wilson	Member of Parliament for Sheffield Attercliffe; 1931–1935	Succeeded by Cecil Wilson
