= 1894 Sheffield Attercliffe by-election =

UK parliamentary by-election

← 1892	5 July 1894	1895 →

Constituency of Sheffield Attercliffe
- Turnout: 79.0% (▼1.2%)

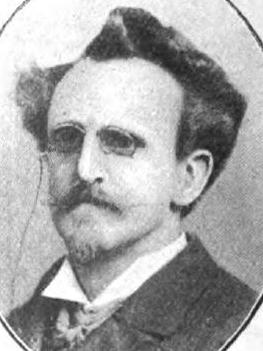
	First party	Second party	Third party
		Con
Candidate	J. Batty Langley	G. Hill Smith	Frank Smith
Party	Liberal	Conservative	Ind. Labour Party
Popular vote	4,486	3,495	1,249
Percentage	48.6%	37.9%	13.5%
Swing	▼7.7%	▼5.8%	New
MP before election
Bernard Coleridge
Liberal
Elected MP
J. Batty Langley
Liberal

A 1894 by-election was held for the British House of Commons constituency of Sheffield Attercliffe on 5 July 1894. It was the first parliamentary election contested by the Independent Labour Party.

== Background ==
The election was caused by the succession of Bernard Coleridge to the peerage. He had been the Liberal Party Member of Parliament for the seat since its creation for the 1885 general election. He had been re-elected at the 1886 and 1892 general elections, but the Conservative Party had taken more than 40% of the vote on each occasion. G. Hill Smith stood for the Conservatives in 1892, receiving 43.1% of the vote, and reducing Coleridge to his smallest majority to date.

The seat of Attercliffe had a large working class population, many working in trades which were well unionised: ironworking, toolmaking and coal mining. Local labour movement leaders believed that the new representative for the seat should be a worker.

== Candidates ==
The Conservative Party re-selected their candidate from 1892, G. Hill Smith.

Several possible Liberal candidates were discussed, including Robert Hadfield, Joshua Rowntree and C. P. Scott, but two names came to the fore: J. Batty Langley and Charles Hobson. Hobson, the leader of the Sheffield Federated Trades Council, was a President of the Labour Electoral Association and would have stood as a Liberal-Labour candidate. Local Liberal leaders hoped that, if he were selected, it would discourage more radical labour movement activists from standing their own candidate. Langley ran a large saw mill in the city, and was an alderman on Sheffield Town Council. He had served as Mayor of Sheffield in 1892–93, when he took the initiative in resolving a major coal strike.

On 18 June, the trades council unanimously endorsed Hobson as a candidate. Several leading trade unionist wrote in support of this decision, including William Bailey of the Nottinghamshire Miners Association, William Edwin Harvey of the Derbyshire Miners Association and Havelock Wilson of the National Sailors' and Firemen's Union. The Independent Labour Party (ILP), although only recently established, was strong in Sheffield, with four main branches and around 400 members, many formerly of the Social Democratic Federation. As its central purpose was to campaign for independent labour representation, it strongly opposed Langley, but its representatives on the trade council decided to endorse Hobson.

Frederick Mappin, Liberal MP for nearby Hallamshire spoke strongly against any working class candidate, holding that they would lose the seat. William Clegg, leader of the Liberal group on the council, argued against selecting Hobson, because he believe that he would prove unable to raise the necessary money to stand. Henry Wilson, MP for Holmfirth, Secretary of the Sheffield Liberal Association, and John Wycliffe Wilson both favoured Hobson but, following Mappin and Clegg's comments, agreed to support Langley. On 22 June, an open meeting of the Liberal Council chose Langley by 160 votes to 2 for Hobson, and 2 for Robert Cameron, who had stood for the party in 1892 in Sheffield Central.

The selection did not entirely settle the issue. At a meeting of the trades council on 23 June, Hobson announced that he would not oppose Langley, but the Daily Chronicle still wrote of him as the "ideal candidate". The ILP responded by proposing one of their own members, Frank Smith. He was narrowly endorsed by the trades council, although some liberal delegates refused to support the decision.

== Campaign ==
Keir Hardie, Tom Mann, Emmeline Pankhurst and Ben Tillett all campaigned for the ILP. Hobson spoke alongside Hardie at a meeting on 1 July, although he stated that he had some differences with the party and considered himself independent.

Langley was only given weak support by the National Liberal Federation, who did not send any speakers. Ben Pickard, General Secretary of the Yorkshire Miners' Association, sent a telegram supporting Langley. Philip Stanhope arranged a meeting between Frank Smith, Hardie and local Liberals, in the hope of persuading the ILP to withdraw, but Smith and Hardie complained that they had been tricked into attending, and left.

== Result ==
Langley held the seat for the Liberals, with their majority only slightly reduced. Both the Liberal and Conservative votes fell, but the ILP only took 13.5% of the votes cast. The Daily News claimed that this was the Liberal's greatest victory since the 1892 general election, while Hardie claimed that the result would harden divisions between the Liberals and the labour movement. The Westminster Gazette held that Langley had only won because he was able to take some votes from the Conservatives.

Immediately after the election, Ramsay MacDonald wrote to Hardie, requesting membership of the ILP. In his letter, he noted that "...Attercliffe came as a rude awakening, and I felt during the contest that it was quite impossible for me to maintain my position as a Liberal any longer..."

The Liberal Party were soon reconciled with the majority of the trades council, and the first independent labour MP for Sheffield was not elected until the 1907 Sheffield Brightside by-election. Langley held Sheffield Attercliffe until the 1909 Sheffield Attercliffe by-election. Frank Smith eventually became Labour Party MP for Nuneaton, but Hobson never stood for Parliament.

Sheffield Atterclife by-election, 1894
Party	Candidate	Votes	%	±%
Liberal	J. Batty Langley	4,486	48.6	−7.7
Conservative	G. Hill Smith	3,495	37.9	−5.8
Ind. Labour Party	Frank Smith	1,249	13.5	New
Majority		991	10.7	−1.9
Turnout		9,230	79.0	−1.2
Liberal hold		Swing	-1.0	

== Previous election ==
General election 1892: Sheffield Attercliffe
Party	Candidate	Votes	%	±%
Liberal	Bernard Coleridge	5,107	56.3	−3.3
Conservative	G. Hill Smith	3,963	43.7	+3.3
Majority		1,144	12.6	−6.6
Turnout		9,070	80.2	+5.1
Liberal hold		Swing	-3.3	

== See also ==
1909 Sheffield Attercliffe by-election
