= William Anderson (British politician) =

British politician

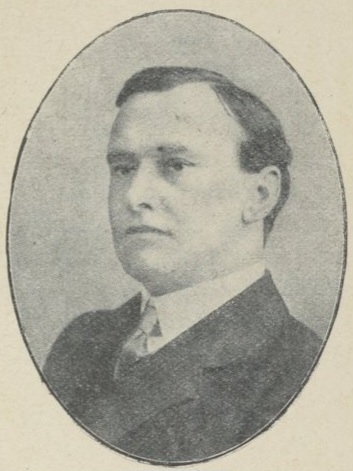
W.C. Anderson

William Crawford Anderson (13 February 1877 – 25 February 1919) was a British socialist politician.

Born in 1877 at Findon, Aberdeenshire, the name Crawford in fact does not appear on his birth certificate. His father Francis Anderson was a blacksmith, who married in 1868, Barbara Cruickshank, an ardent radical; she being responsible for Anderson's education, she was an intelligent and widely read woman of strong, radical, Presbyterian views who encouraged William to read extensively. At the age of sixteen he was apprenticed in Aberdeen as a manufacturing chemist and began to attend meetings of the local Social Democratic Federation (SDF), at this time he also followed Tom Mann’s campaign for the by-election in 1896.

After listening to an eloquent speech by Carrie Martyn at an SDF meeting, he became intent on improving himself and began to read rigorously; he read everything from Dickens, Ruskin, Thackeray and Hardy, to name but a few. Robert Blatchford’s Merrie England had a profound effect upon Anderson although he did not at this point consider himself to be a socialist, but advocated Land Nationalism.

The most influential figure in his transition to Socialism was A. E. Fletcher, the editor of The New Age. Fletcher was running in the Glasgow elections supported by the Independent Labour Party (ILP). In 1900 Anderson moved to Glasgow and volunteered to help Fletcher in the election; he in turn joined the Glasgow branch of the ILP and also the Shop Assistants Union, then moved to the Manufacturing Chemists. The transition from radical to socialist politics was completed after Anderson's move to Glasgow, where he contested the Camlachie seat in the 1900 khaki election on a pro-Boer platform, supported by the ILP. He was elected chairman of the Union after just three months. In 1902 he was the delegate of the ILP to the Manchester Conference. By 1903 he had become an organiser and official of the union with the aim of strengthening local branches and creating new ones, and was a major figure in the vigorous campaign of 1907 to improve the conditions of shop managers, before he left the union that year. In the same year he attended his first ILP conference and reinforced his reputation as a public speaker; he addressed audiences on a number of subjects ranging from Tariff reform, National Service, and key political issues. During his many addresses it is rumoured he was forced to do an encore by the audience, so he repeated part of his speech again. Still only in his early thirties, he was one of the best known leaders of the ILP. To reinforce this, he was elected to the National Administration Council of the ILP in 1908. His aim was to avoid a particular faction. It was noted in 1910 by Fenner Brockway, whom Anderson influenced to take the job of editor of the Labour Leader, that Anderson was an ’influential member of the NAC, who stood midway between Snowden and MacDonald in their quarrels. He wanted to work with the Labour Party to smooth suspicions with which it regarded the ILP.’

In 1910 he was elected chair of the ILP, a position he held until 1913. In September 1911 he was appointed to the Chair of the committee to set up a new Labour newspaper, which became the Daily Citizen. He acted as the Vice Chairman and leader writer. The paper was launched in 1912 but never flourished; Anderson left before it failed.

In 1913 he was the speaker for the special conference on the Public Transport Strike and in 1914 was a supporter of the Anti-War stance. The National Council of the ILP met to formulate a manifesto; Anderson read a draft which the council chose above Hardie's or Glasier's. Finally in 1914 on his third attempt he entered parliament; however he lost his seat in 1918 due to his opposition to war.

In 1919 he caught a chill which developed into influenza and he died not long after. He was cremated at Golders Green. Anderson was survived by his wife, the trade unionist and women's rights campaigner Mary Macarthur (whom he married in 1911; she d. 1921) and his daughter Nancy.

Scottish socialist politician Bruce Glasier’s opinion of him was: ‘Most naturally gifted parliamentarian born front bench, and maybe Prime Minister. Neither a prophet nor a pioneer.’

Parliament of the United Kingdom
Preceded by Joseph Pointer	Member of Parliament for Sheffield Attercliffe; 1914–1918	Succeeded by Thomas Worrall Casey
Party political offices
Preceded by Fred Jowett	Chairman of the Independent Labour Party; 1911–1913	Succeeded by Keir Hardie
Preceded by Tom Fox	Chair of the Labour Party; 1914–1916	Succeeded by George Wardle
