= Thomas Worrall Casey =

Member of Parliament for Sheffield Attercliffe
- In office 1918–1922
- Preceded by: William Anderson
- Succeeded by: Cecil Wilson

Personal details
- Born: 13 October 1869 Sheffield, England
- Died: 29 November 1949 (aged 80) Sheffield, England
- Party: Liberal

Thomas Worrall Casey (13 October 1869 – 29 November 1949) was a British Liberal politician and Trade Union leader.

== Background ==
He was born in the Intake district of Sheffield, as the son of William and Jemima Ann Casey. He was educated at Gleadless Church School. He was married in 1894. He had two sons and three daughters. In 1916 his eldest son, Alpheaus Abbott Casey of the York and Lancaster Regiment, was killed in the First World War. His memorial can be found in Thiepval in the Lancaster regiment.

== Trade Unionism ==
He started work at 12 years of age on a farm. At 13 he went to work at Birley Colliery, near Sheffield, where he remained until 18 years of age. He was employed at this time as an engineman. He left and started at Cadeby Colliery, near Rotherham, as a winding engineman, and remained there for 24 years. On leaving he was presented with a Gold Hunter Watch by workmen and officials. He was elected as the General Secretary of the National Winding and General Engineers' Society, serving for 25 years.

== Politics ==
At the 1918 general election, Casey was elected for the Sheffield Attercliffe constituency. He benefitted from being endorsed by Prime Minister David Lloyd George.

General election 1918: Sheffield Attercliffe Electorate 35,923
Party	Candidate	Votes	%	±%
National Liberal	Thomas Worrall Casey	12,308	65.3	
Labour	William Anderson	6,539	34.7	
Majority		5,769	30.6	
Turnout			52.5	
National Liberal gain from Labour		Swing		

In parliament, he joined Lloyd George's Liberal group that was to form itself into the National Liberal Party. He lost his seat at the 1922 general election.

General election 1922: Sheffield Attercliffe Electorate 34,671
Party	Candidate	Votes	%	±%
Labour	Cecil Wilson	16,206	68.2	
National Liberal	Thomas Worrall Casey	7,562	31.8	
Majority		8,644	36.4	
Turnout			68.6	
Labour gain from Liberal		Swing		

Following Liberal reunion in 1923 he contested Ilkeston in 1923,

General election 1923: Ilkeston Electorate 31,503
Party	Candidate	Votes	%	±%
Labour	George Oliver	9,191	42.1	+2.1
Unionist	William Marshall Freeman	6,566	30.0	+5.3
Liberal	Thomas Worrall Casey	6,112	27.9	−7.4
Majority		2,625	12.1	+7.4
Turnout			69.4	−7.4
Labour hold		Swing	-1.6	

He then moved to contest Gloucester in 1929 as a Liberal. He finally fought Rotherham in 1935 as a Liberal National.

General election 1935: Rotherham Electorate
Party	Candidate	Votes	%	±%
Labour	William Dobbie	29,725	67.5	
National Liberal	Thomas Worrall Casey	14,298	32.5	
Majority		15,427	35.0	
Turnout			76.7	
Labour hold		Swing		

With this final loss, he gave up on Parliamentary politics. He was elected to Mexborough Urban District Council. He was a Justice of the Peace in the city of Sheffield. He was a Methodist lay preacher for 60 years.

He died in Sheffield aged 80.

Parliament of the United Kingdom
Preceded by William Anderson	Member of Parliament for Sheffield Attercliffe; 1918–1922	Succeeded by Cecil Wilson
