= John Hynd =

British politician (1902–1971)

The Right Honourable John Burns Hynd

Minister of Pensions
- In office 17 April 1947 – 7 October 1947
- Monarch: George VI
- Prime Minister: Clement Attlee
- Preceded by: Wilfred Paling
- Succeeded by: George Buchanan

Chancellor of the Duchy of Lancaster
- In office 4 August 1945 – 17 April 1947
- Monarch: George VI
- Prime Minister: Clement Attlee
- Preceded by: James Arthur Salter
- Succeeded by: The Lord Pakenham

Member of Parliament for Sheffield Attercliffe
- In office 21 February 1944 – 29 May 1970
- Preceded by: Cecil Henry Wilson
- Succeeded by: Patrick Duffy

Personal details
- Born: 4 April 1902
- Died: 8 November 1971 (aged 69) Enfield, London

John Burns Hynd (4 April 1902 – 8 November 1971) was a British Labour Party politician.

Educated at St Ninian's Episcopal School and Caledonian Road School, Perth, he left school at 14 and became a Railway Clerk in the District Office of the London, Midland and Scottish Railway, Perth, where he worked until 1925. He then became a Trade Union Clerk with the National Union of Railwaymen until 1944.

Hynd was elected as Member of Parliament (MP) for Sheffield Attercliffe at a by-election in 1944, holding the seat until 1970. He held office as Chancellor of the Duchy of Lancaster, and Minister for Germany and Austria, 1945–1947, and as Minister of Pensions during 1947.

He was a Member of the General Medical Council from 1950 to 1955. He was Chairman of the Anglo-German and Anglo-Latin American Parliamentary Groups. He was awarded the Grand Cross of Merit with Star (West German Republic) in 1958, the Chevalier of the Legion of Honour, and Great Golden Cross of Honour with Star (Austria). He died in Enfield aged 69.

Parliament of the United Kingdom
Preceded by Cecil Wilson	Member of Parliament for Sheffield Attercliffe; 1944–1970	Succeeded by Patrick Duffy
Preceded by Arthur Salter	Chancellor of the Duchy of Lancaster; 1945–1947	Succeeded by Baron Pakenham
Preceded by Wilfred Paling	Minister of Pensions; 1947	Succeeded by George Buchanan
