= Patrick Duffy (British politician) =

British politician (1920–2026)

Sir Patrick Duffy

Member of Parliament
- In office 18 June 1970 – 16 March 1992
- Preceded by: John Hynd
- Succeeded by: Clive Betts
- Constituency: Sheffield Attercliffe
- In office 21 March 1963 – 10 March 1966
- Preceded by: Glenvil Hall
- Succeeded by: Richard Wainwright
- Constituency: Colne Valley

Personal details
- Born: Albert Edward Patrick Duffy; 17 June 1920 Wigan, Lancashire, England
- Died: 2 January 2026 (aged 105) Doncaster, South Yorkshire, England
- Party: Labour
- Education: London School of Economics; Columbia University

Military service
- Allegiance: United Kingdom
- Branch/service: Royal Navy
- Service years: 1940–1946
- Rank: Commander
- Unit: Fleet Air Arm
- Commands: HMS Implacable
- Conflict: World War II; Battle of Britain

Sir Albert Edward Patrick Duffy (17 June 1920 – 2 January 2026) was a British economist and Labour Party politician. He was the Member of Parliament (MP) for Colne Valley from the 1963 Colne Valley by-election until his defeat in 1966, and for Sheffield Attercliffe from the 1970 general election until his retirement in 1992. Duffy was also a Minister of the Navy in the 1970s, and president of the NATO Assembly in the 1980s. Following the death of Ronald Atkins on 30 December 2020, Duffy became Britain's oldest surviving former MP. On 4 January 2025, he overtook Atkins's lifespan and became the longest-lived MP in British history.

== Early life and career ==
Duffy was born in Wigan, Lancashire, on 17 June 1920, to Irish Catholic immigrant parents James and Margaret Duffy, who were both from the village of Raith, near Aghamore in County Mayo. James and his father, who was also named Patrick, moved to England as migrant agricultural workers in the late 19th and early 20th century. James worked as a miner in Wigan's Maypole pit, before moving with his family to the mining village of Rossington near Doncaster in South Yorkshire in 1925. In 2024, the younger Patrick still lived in Doncaster.

He served in the Fleet Air Arm in World War II. After his plane crashed near Scapa Flow in Orkney, Duffy, still in his early 20s, was given the last rites by a priest; however, despite being registered as 100% disabled, he was successfully treated by the pioneering surgeon Harold Gillies and left the forces in 1946 with the rank of Commander at the Naval School of Air Radar.

Duffy's interest in politics was stirred whilst he was a student at the London School of Economics (LSE); it was there and at Columbia University in the United States where he obtained his degree and Doctorate of Law. Following this, he became a lecturer at the University of Leeds. He lectured there from 1950 to 1963, and from 1967 to 1970, with a break for his initial stint in Parliament. During this period, he was also a visiting professor at Drew University in Madison, New Jersey, United States. Later in his career, he was a visiting professor at the American Graduate School of International Business, from 1982 to 1993, and at Wheaton's International Business Institute in Illinois, from 1992.

== Political career ==
Duffy first contested a Parliamentary seat when he stood as the Labour Party candidate for Tiverton in the 1950 general election, when he was completing his studies at LSE, before he took students – including his future Labour colleague Shirley Catlin, who went on to become Baroness Shirley Williams – to Columbia University in New York. Despite Tiverton being a safe seat for the Conservative Party, Duffy contested it twice more, in 1951 and 1955, before moving to the more promising seat of Colne Valley, which he won at a by-election in 1963. He held Colne Valley until the 1966 general election, when he was defeated by the Liberal Richard Wainwright, despite the national swing to Labour.

He was selected to stand for Sheffield Attercliffe (which had been a safe seat for the Labour Party) at the 1970 general election following a close selection contest with George Caborn, father of future Sheffield MP Richard Caborn. He was consequently elected to represent the constituency in the House of Commons at that general election; Duffy held onto the seat with five-figure majorities at each of the subsequent contests he fought there.

Duffy was Parliamentary Private Secretary to the Secretary of State for Defence from 1974 to 1976, and Parliamentary Under-Secretary of State for Defence (Royal Navy) MoD in Jim Callaghan's Government from 1976 to 1979. Following Labour's defeat at the 1979 general election, Duffy was Opposition Spokesman on Defence from 1979 to 1981, and again from 1983 to 1984.

He was a "moderate" on the right of the Labour Party, being a staunch pro-European and opponent of unilateral nuclear disarmament. He voted for John Silkin in the 1980 leadership election, rather than Michael Foot, the successful candidate from the party's soft left. During this period, there was an attempt to deselect Duffy, which failed by just five votes. Politically, he has said that he was close to Callaghan, Roy Hattersley, John Smith, and the young Gordon Brown. Despite his earlier pro-European views, Duffy supported the 2016 vote in favour of Britain's departure from the European Union, commenting, "Lifelong Labour supporters, like me, wanted Brexit. Reluctantly and regretfully for me, and I was a Common Marketeer in the 1970s, the creation of the Eurozone made the European Union no longer a practical venture."

Following the death in May 1981 of IRA's Bobby Sands, one of the Irish hunger strikers who starved himself to death in prison, Duffy was the sole member of the British House of Commons to condemn Margaret Thatcher, according to The New York Times. In comments directed at Thatcher, amidst heckles from the Conservative benches (and frowns from his own side, whose official line was to support the Prime Minister's stance), he remarked:

By appearing hard and unfeeling, or firm and determined, you have spectacularly illuminated for growing bodies of opinion in neighbouring and allied countries, whose comments are flowing in hourly, your government's moral bankruptcy and the colossal and criminal incompetence of Conservative governments of all times in their dealings in Ireland.

These comments caused outrage, but led to Duffy receiving 600 letters in support from around the world. Despite this, however, Thatcher later invited Duffy for tea when he was appointed President of the NATO Assembly and the two became friends. "We got on so well that her officials were starting to get nervous that our meeting would never finish", he commented in 2020.

Duffy stood down from Parliament at the 1992 general election. In a 2020 interview with Catholic magazine The Tablet, Duffy was quoted ("half in jest", according to the interviewer) on his career as an MP: "I spent 19 and a half of my 25 years in opposition. If I'd known that was how it was going to be at the beginning, I'd never have gone in for it". He was president of the Labour Life Group, in keeping with his pro-life views on abortion. He had hoped to go to the House of Lords upon his retirement, but, according to The Tablet, the then-Leader of the Labour Party Neil Kinnock was "not a fan" of his.

== Outside Parliament ==
Duffy was president of the North Atlantic Assembly (the parliamentary arm of NATO) during the first-time delegations from the Warsaw Pact nations. In 1991, he served as leader of the first Western parliamentary delegation to the Kremlin, and that year, he was knighted by Queen Elizabeth II, in recognition of his NATO role, becoming entitled to be known as Sir Patrick Duffy for his contribution to the Western Alliance. In 2014, he said "After the Catholic Church and the International Post Office and the International Labour Organisation in Geneva, I don't believe a more impressive international organisation has emerged other than Nato." He was president of the NATO Assembly at a time when the Cold War came to an end in the late 1980s and early 1990s; it was in this capacity that he also had a private audience with Pope John Paul II, on 9 October 1989. It was said that Duffy was a "major force" in bringing the Cold War to an end. In 1993, he was made an honorary Doctor of Humane Letters by the Dominican University, Illinois.

Duffy also functioned as Deputy Chair of the Atlantic Council of the UK. He served as a member of the Advisory Boards of the Centre of Defence and International Security Studies at Hull University, and the Universities of Lancaster and York Defence Research Institute. He also served as an associate of the Centre for Defence and International Security Studies at Lancaster University, the International Business Institute and Azusa Pacific University, where he served as a guest lecturer during the autumn semester of 2007, and was keynote speaker for Azusa Pacific University's Economic Summit.

Speaking in 2020, Duffy stated that "I've never left Labour and I never will". Aged 100, he was said to be "intrigued" by "the ongoing battle between [Prime Minister] Boris Johnson and [Labour Party leader] Keir Starmer", remarking of the latter that he was "infinitely better than Jeremy Corbyn", Starmer's predecessor as party leader. In 2024, when asked if he was still a Labour supporter, he replied: "Oh yes! More than ever!".

== Personal life ==
In 2014, Duffy published his autobiography, Growing Up Irish in Britain, British in Ireland and in Washington, Moscow, Rome and Sydney. In 2024, he published a second volume, From Wigan to Westminster: Hot Wars, Cold Wars and the Carrier Strike Groups.

A practising Catholic, Duffy completed the El Camino Santiago de Compostela pilgrimage (known as the Way of St. James in English) for six years running whilst in his 80s, which involved him walking 25 km a day for 35 days. He was invested as a Knight Commander of the Order of St. Gregory the Great (KCSG) at the age of 96 in 2017. He never married, though according to Yorkshire Live, "he says he was not short of attractive female company during his many years in office".

Duffy turned 100 on 17 June 2020, and celebrated his birthday at home in Doncaster; he also had a home in County Roscommon in Ireland, where he spent much of his time. When asked for the secret to his longevity, he said "I never smoked, I never used my ministerial car when I could walk – I never used any such transport when I could avoid doing so – and I read". In December 2020, following the death of his old Parliamentary Labour Party colleague Ronald Atkins at 104, he became the oldest living former MP. At 105, Duffy was the longest-lived MP in British history.

Duffy died following a short illness in Doncaster on 2 January 2026, aged 105.

Parliament of the United Kingdom
Preceded by Glenvil Hall	Member of Parliament for Colne Valley; 1963–1966	Succeeded by Richard Wainwright
Preceded by John Hynd	Member of Parliament for Sheffield Attercliffe; 1970–1992	Succeeded by Clive Betts
