= Cecil Wilson (politician) =

British politician (1862–1945)

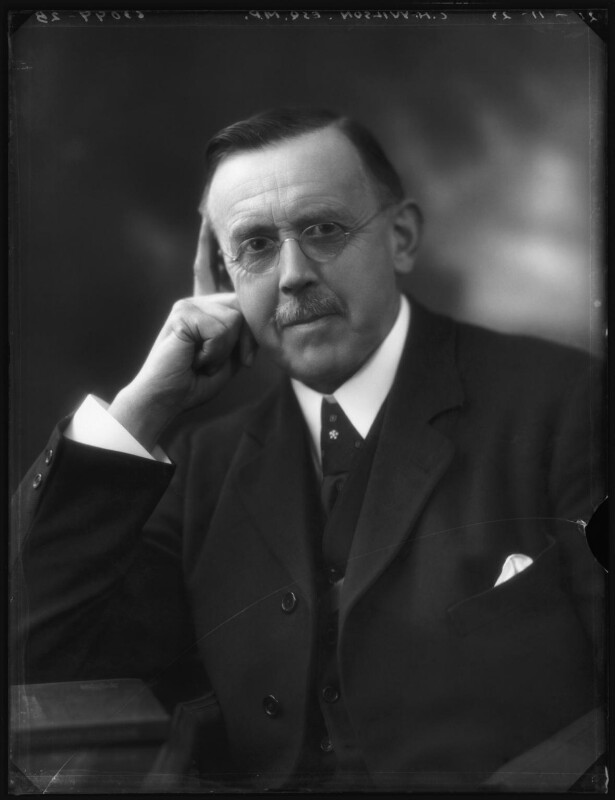
Wilson in 1923

Cecil Henry Wilson (8 September 1862 – 7 November 1945) was a British pacifist Labour Party member of parliament (MP).

== Biography ==
Born on 8 September 1862, in Mansfield, to Liberal Party Member of Parliament for Holmfirth, Henry Wilson, Wilson attended Wesley College, Sheffield and the Victoria University of Manchester.

In 1903, Wilson was elected to Sheffield City Council for the Darnall ward, a seat he held until 1924. He became a justice of the peace in 1907. He also joined the National Anti-Gambling League, coming to chair it by the early 1920s. From 1919 until 1922, Wilson was the Labour group leader on Sheffield City Council.

At the 1922 general election, Wilson was elected MP for Sheffield Attercliffe. He held the seat until the 1931 general election, when he narrowly lost to the Conservative Party candidate Cecil Frederick Pike. However, he retook the seat at the 1935 general election. Wilson resigned on 7 February 1944, due to ill health, and died on 7 November 1945, aged 83, in Westminster.

Parliament of the United Kingdom
Preceded by Thomas Worrall Casey	Member of Parliament for Sheffield Attercliffe; 1922–1931	Succeeded by Cecil Pike
Preceded by Cecil Pike	Member of Parliament for Sheffield Attercliffe; 1935–1944	Succeeded by John Hynd
