= Sheffield South East =

UK Parliament constituency (since 2010)

Coordinates: 53.37°N 1.38°W

- Borough constituency for the House of Commons
- Boundaries since 2024
- Boundary of Sheffield South East in Yorkshire and the Humber
- County: South Yorkshire
- Electorate: 67,031 (December 2019)

Current constituency
- Created: 2010
- Member of Parliament: Clive Betts (Labour)
- Created from: Sheffield Attercliffe

Sheffield South East is a constituency (Note: A borough constituency (for the purposes of election expenses and type of returning officer)) represented in the House of Commons of the UK Parliament since its 2010 creation by Clive Betts, a member of the Labour Party. (Note: As with all constituencies, the constituency elects one Member of Parliament (MP) by the first past the post system of election at least every five years.)

== Constituency profile ==
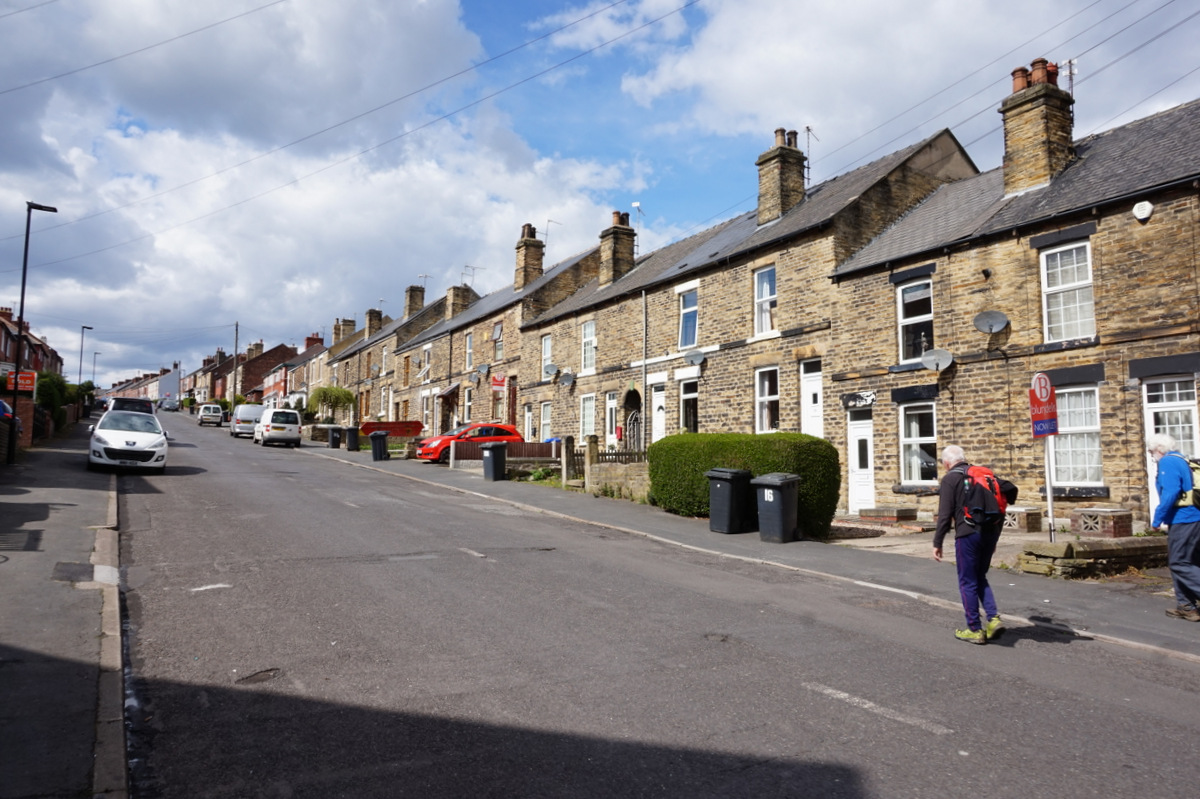
Queen's Road, Beighton

Sheffield South East is a constituency in South Yorkshire in England. It covers the outer suburbs of Sheffield to the east and south-east of the city centre, including Tinsley, Attercliffe, Darnall, Handsworth, Richmond, Woodhouse, Birley, Hackenthorpe, Beighton and Mosborough.

Sheffield is traditionally an industrial city that grew rapidly during the late 18th and early 19th centuries, with steelmaking and coal mining being the predominant industries. Much of the city was redeveloped after World War II; the city's steel industry made it a target for the Luftwaffe in the Sheffield Blitz. This constituency contains most of Sheffield's industrial district, which has largely been regenerated, and many former mining villages which have mostly been absorbed into the city's suburban expansion. The north of the constituency close to the former industrial area is highly-deprived with a large quantity of council housing, whilst the southern suburbs and villages are wealthier. Most of the constituency's residents live in semi-detached housing and the average house price is around half the UK average.

Residents of Sheffield South East have a similar age profile to the rest of the country. They have low rates of income, average levels of homeownership, and the child poverty rate is high. Residents generally have low levels of education and a high proportion work in the retail and manufacturing sectors. The percentage claiming unemployment benefits is above-average. White people made up 81% of the population at the 2021 census. Asians, mostly of Pakistani origin, were the largest ethnic minority group at 11%. Almost all of the constituency's Asian residents lived in the north in Tinsley and Darnall where they made up around half the population.

Most of Sheffield South East is represented by the Labour Party at the local city council, with some Liberal Democrats and Reform UK councillors elected in the south of the constituency. Voters across the constituency strongly supported leaving the European Union in the 2016 referendum; an estimated 65% voted in favour of Brexit compared to the UK-wide figure of 52%.

== History ==
This seat succeeded Sheffield Attercliffe (represented by the Labour MP Clive Betts since 1992) following a minor change (Note: The only change being the loss in 2010 of the shared part of the Richmond, South Yorkshire ward to the Sheffield Heeley constintuency.) recommended by the Boundary Commission for England for the 2010 general election and accepted by Parliament.

Including its predecessor, Sheffield Attercliffe, Labour majorities from 1935 until 2019 were substantial, making it one of the party's safe seats. In 2010, the closest runner-up was the Liberal Democrat candidate. In 2015, UKIP came second, with nearly 22% of the vote, beating both the Conservatives and the Liberal Democrats (the Liberal Democrat vote declining by 18%). In 2019, a collapse in the Labour vote reduced the party's majority to a little over 4,000 votes, making it a marginal seat between them and the Conservative Party. In 2024, the Conservative vote collapsed in turn, and the Labour majority increased back up to nearly 12,500. This was helped by Reform UK not putting up a candidate in this, or any other Sheffield seat.

== Boundaries ==
Map of 2010–2024 boundaries

2010–2024: The City of Sheffield wards of: Beighton; Birley; Darnall; Mosborough; and Woodhouse (as they existed on 12 April 2005).

2024–present: The City of Sheffield wards of: Beighton; Birley; Darnall; Mosborough; Richmond (polling districts UA, UD, UF, UG and UH); Woodhouse (as they existed in 1 December 2020).

In order to bring the electorate within the permitted range, the majority of the Richmond ward was transferred in from Sheffield Heeley.

== Members of Parliament ==
Sheffield Attercliffe prior to 2010

Election	Member	Party
2010	Clive Betts	Labour

== Elections ==
=== Elections in the 2020s ===
General election 2024: Sheffield South East
Party	Candidate	Votes	%	±%
Labour	Clive Betts	18,710	52.3	+5.6
Conservative	Caroline Kampila	6,252	17.5	−18.1
Liberal Democrats	Sophie Thornton	3,421	9.6	+4.9
Green	Hannah Nicklin	3,158	8.8	+8.6
Independent	Jack Carrington	1,716	4.8	N/A
Workers Party	Muzafar Rahman	1,453	4.1	N/A
SDP	Matthew Leese	1,061	3.0	N/A
Majority		12,458	35.8	+24.7
Turnout		35,771	48.2	−13.3
Registered electors		74,194		
Labour hold		Swing	+11.9	

=== Elections in the 2010s ===
2019 notional result
Party	Vote	%
Labour	21,923	46.7
Conservative	16,709	35.6
Brexit Party	5,032	10.7
Liberal Democrats	2,186	4.7
Others	966	2.1
Green	80	0.2
Turnout	46,896	61.5
Electorate	76,223	

General election 2019: Sheffield South East
Party	Candidate	Votes	%	±%
Labour	Clive Betts	19,359	46.1	−12.4
Conservative	Marc Bayliss	15,070	35.9	+4.4
Brexit Party	Kirk Kus	4,478	10.7	N/A
Liberal Democrats	Rajin Chowdhury	2,125	5.1	+1.8
Yorkshire	Alex Martin	966	2.3	N/A
Majority		4,289	10.2	−16.8
Turnout		41,998	61.9	−1.5
Labour hold		Swing	−8.4	

General election 2017: Sheffield South East
Party	Candidate	Votes	%	±%
Labour	Clive Betts	25,520	58.5	+7.1
Conservative	Lindsey Cawrey	13,722	31.5	+14.1
UKIP	Dennise Dawson	2,820	6.5	−15.4
Liberal Democrats	Colin Ross	1,432	3.3	−2.0
SDP	Ishleen Oberoi	102	0.2	N/A
Majority		11,798	27.0	−2.5
Turnout		43,596	63.4	+4.2
Labour hold		Swing	−3.5	

General election 2015: Sheffield South East
Party	Candidate	Votes	%	±%
Labour	Clive Betts	21,439	51.4	+2.7
UKIP	Steven Winstone	9,128	21.9	+17.3
Conservative	Matt Sleat	7,242	17.4	0.0
Liberal Democrats	Gail Smith	2,226	5.3	−18.0
Green	Linda Duckenfield	1,117	2.7	N/A
CISTA	Jen Battersby	207	0.5	N/A
TUSC	Ian Whitehouse	185	0.4	N/A
English Democrat	Matthew Roberts	141	0.3	N/A
Majority		12,311	29.5	+4.1
Turnout		41,685	59.2	−2.3
Labour hold		Swing	−7.3	

General election 2010: Sheffield South East
Party	Candidate	Votes	%	±%
Labour	Clive Betts	20,169	48.7	−11.6
Liberal Democrats	Gail Smith	9,664	23.3	+6.4
Conservative	Nigel Bonson	7,202	17.4	+3.0
BNP	Chris Hartigan	2,345	5.7	+1.6
UKIP	Jonathan Arnott	1,889	4.6	+0.2
Communist	Steve Andrew	139	0.3	N/A
Majority		10,505	25.4	−17.73
Turnout		41,408	61.5	+6.8
Labour hold		Swing	−9.0	

== See also ==
- List of parliamentary constituencies in South Yorkshire
- List of United Kingdom Parliament constituencies
- The predecessor seat: Sheffield Attercliffe
