= Andrew Alexander (journalist) =

English journalist & columnist (1935–2015)

- Born: 12 May 1935; Worthing
- Died: 5 July 2015 (aged 80); Tunbridge Wells Hospital
- Alma mater: Lancing College
- Occupation: Journalist, writer, city editor, columnist, author
- Employer: Daily Mail (1972–2000); The Daily Telegraph (1966–1972); The Yorkshire Post (1960–1965)
- Political party: Conservative Party

Andrew Clive Alexander (12 May 1935 – 5 July 2015) was an English journalist and columnist for The Yorkshire Post, The Daily Telegraph and The Daily Mail. Between 1984 and 2000 he was the city editor for the Daily Mail

== Life ==
Alexander was born in Worthing on 12 May 1935. His father, Ronald Fergus Alexander was a teacher and his mother was Doreen Olivia Myfanwy. He was educated at Lancing College in Lancing, West Sussex. Some time after leaving college in 1960, he applied for a job at Yorkshire Post, where he started writing about economics, despite not having trained in the subject.

While at The Post, he was the unsuccessful Conservative candidate at the 1963 Colne Valley by-election. and lost again in the 1964 General Election. In 1966, he took on a role at The Daily Telegraph as a leader writer and parliamentary sketch writer. There he became an advocate of the Thatcherism set of beliefs. In 1972, he moved from The Telegraph to Daily Mail, as a sketch writer.

Alexander won Specialist Writer of the Year in the British Press Awards for 1976 and 1977. He was denounced in the House of Commons by the Labour MP Dennis Canavan as "that prizewinning cynical jackass". He became the City editor for the Mail in 1984, where he could focus on financial commentary during Margaret Thatcher's time in office. There he argued against entry into the European Monetary System, which led to Black Wednesday crash. He remained the City editor until 2000, and instead wrote a weekly column for the Mail until 2014. Alexander died at age 80 on 5 July 2015.

== Works ==
- (with Alan Watkins), The Making of the Prime Minister 1970 (London: Macdonald, 1970).
- America and the Imperialism of Ignorance: US Foreign Policy since 1945 (London: Biteback, 2011).
