= Clive Betts =

British politician (born 1950)

Clive Betts MP
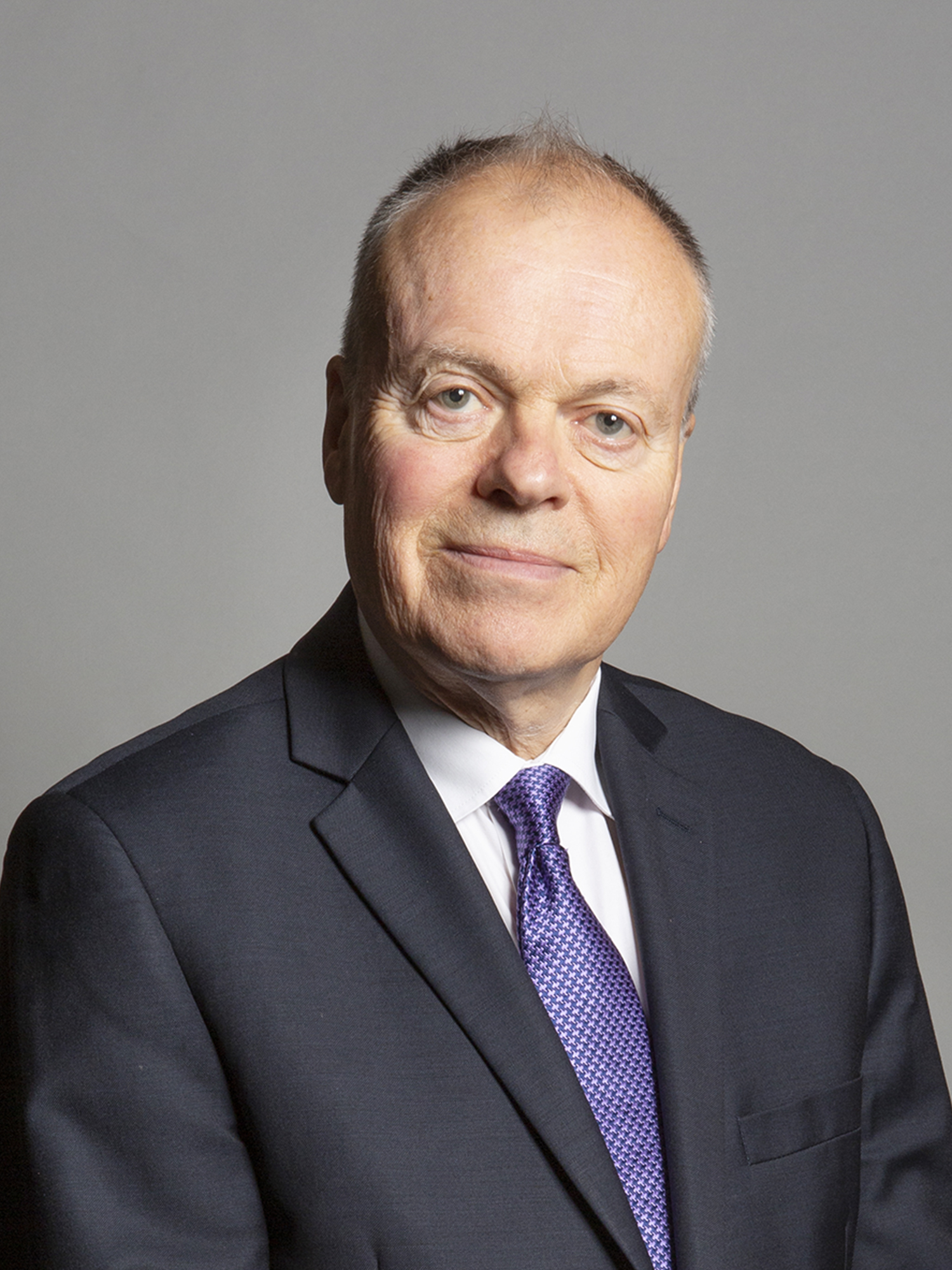
- Official portrait, 2019

Chair of the Levelling Up, Housing and Communities Committee (Note: Housing, Communities and Local Government Committee until 2021.)
- In office 10 June 2010 – 30 May 2024
- Preceded by: Phyllis Starkey
- Succeeded by: Florence Eshalomi

Lord Commissioner of the Treasury
- In office 28 July 1998 – 7 June 2001
- Prime Minister: Tony Blair
- Preceded by: Graham Allen
- Succeeded by: John Heppell

Member of Parliament for Sheffield South East Sheffield Attercliffe (1992–2010)
- Incumbent
- Assumed office 9 April 1992
- Preceded by: Patrick Duffy
- Majority: 12,451 (35.8%)

Leader of Sheffield City Council
- In office 1987–1992
- Preceded by: David Blunkett
- Succeeded by: Mike Bower

Personal details
- Born: Clive James Charles Betts; 13 January 1950 (age 76) Sheffield, Yorkshire, England
- Party: Labour
- Domestic partner: James Thomas
- Education: Pembroke College, Cambridge
- Website: clivebetts.com parliament..clive-betts

Clive James Charles Betts (born 13 January 1950) is a British Labour Party politician and former economist who has served as the Member of Parliament (MP) for Sheffield South East, previously Sheffield Attercliffe since 1992.

== Early life and pre-parliamentary career ==
Clive Betts was born on 13 January 1950 in a council prefab in Dore, Sheffield. He was state educated at the Longley School in Sheffield, King Edward VII School, Sheffield, before studying at Pembroke College, Cambridge, where he received a BA in Economics and Politics.

He joined the Labour Party in 1969 and joined the Trades Union Congress in 1971 as an economist. In 1973, he was appointed as an economist with Derbyshire County Council, and moved to the South Yorkshire County Council in 1974 where he was an economist until 1986. In 1986, he was appointed as an economist with Rotherham Borough Council.

At the October 1974 general election, Betts stood as the Labour candidate in Sheffield Hallam, coming second with 29% of the vote behind the incumbent Conservative MP John Osborn.

Betts stood in Louth at the 1979 general election, coming third with 21.5% of the vote behind the incumbent Conservative MP Michael Brotherton and the Liberal candidate.

=== Local government career ===
Betts stood unsuccessfully as the Labour Party candidate in Sheffield's Burngreave ward in the 1975 city council election. He was subsequently elected in the Firth Park ward in the 1976 city council election and re-elected in 1980, 1984 and 1988.

As a Sheffield City councillor, he was chair of the Housing Committee for six years, deputy leader and chair of the Finance Committee for one year and the chief whip of the Labour Group for three years. He was also formerly the group secretary.

Betts became deputy leader of Sheffield City Council under David Blunkett in 1986. He succeeded Blunkett as leader in 1987 following the latter's election as MP for Sheffield Brightside. As leader of the council, Betts presided over the council's controversial decision to fund the 1991 World Student Games.

== Parliamentary career ==
Betts was elected to Parliament at the 1992 general election as MP for Sheffield Attercliffe with 57.5% of the vote and a majority of 15,480.

At the 1997 general election, Betts was re-elected as MP for Sheffield Attercliffe with an increased vote share of 65.3% and an increased majority of 21,818.

He was again re-elected at the 2001 general election, with an increased vote share of 67.8% and a decreased majority of 18,844.

Betts was again re-elected at the 2005 general election, with a decreased vote share of 60.1% and a decreased majority of 15,967. In 2007 he served as the chair of the All Party Urban Development Group, an All-party parliamentary group.

In 2009, he was one of 95 MPs who founded Labour Friends of Palestine and the Middle East.

Prior to the 2010 general election, Betts' constituency of Sheffield Attercliffe was abolished, and replaced with Sheffield South East. At the election, Betts was elected to Parliament as MP for Sheffield South East with 48.7% of the vote and a majority of 10,505.

Since 10 June 2010, he has been chairman of the Communities and Local Government Committee and, on 19 June 2015, was returned unopposed as its chairman.

At the 2015 general election, Betts was re-elected as MP for Sheffield South East with an increased vote share of 51.4% and an increased majority of 12,311.

Betts backed remain in the 2016 Brexit referendum.

He supported Owen Smith in the 2016 Labour leadership election.

At the snap 2017 general election, Betts was again re-elected, with an increased vote share of 58.5% and a decreased majority of 11,798.

He was again re-elected at the 2019 general election, with a decreased vote share of 46.1% and a decreased majority of 4,289.

Betts was one of 125 Labour MPs that defied the party whip to support a ceasefire in Gaza.

Betts was again re-elected at the 2024 general election, with an increased vote share of 52.3% and an increased majority of 12,458. Despite being identified as a 'thorn in many Ministers' sides' during his time as chairman of the parliamentary select housing committee, in October 2024 Betts was replaced by Florence Eshalomi.

Betts serves as Chair of the All Party Parliamentary Groups on Football; the Netherlands; Somaliland; Local Authority Pension Funds; and Pension Clawback, and is Vice Chair of the All Party Parliamentary Groups on Serbia; Electric Vehicles; and Hydrogen.

In November 2024, Betts voted in favour of the Terminally Ill Adults (End of Life) Bill, which proposes to legalise assisted suicide.

In February 2025, Betts was appointed to chair a 'new taskforce to support the growth of the build-to-rent sector', working alongside build-to-rent developers, operators, investors, the British Property Federation and the Association for Rental Living.

On 9 May 2026, Betts called on Keir Starmer to resign following the 2026 local elections.

== Controversies ==
In 2003, Betts was suspended from the House of Commons for seven days for irregularities involving the employment and visa of Jose Gasparo, a Brazilian student with previous experience as a male escort. The Daily Telegraph newspaper reported on 10 July 2010 that Betts' partner and parliamentary assistant, James Thomas, had tried to edit this fact from Betts' English Wikipedia page in an attempt to cover it up. Betts was found guilty of breaching the MPs' code of conduct, with the Standards and Privileges Committee stating that he had acted "extremely foolishly" and had risked damaging public confidence in the integrity of Parliament. Particular concerns involved his failure to disclose Gasparo's background to parliamentary authorities and the fact that Betts had knowingly photocopied an altered document on Gasparo's behalf. Betts gave an "unreserved apology" in a personal statement to MPs when the report was published.

Also in 2003, Betts was subject to criticism for his accommodation expenses after he had previously campaigned for an increase in MPs' entitlements on the ground of "hardship". It was reported by The Times that Betts had "flipped" his designated second home to Yorkshire before buying a "country estate" there, before "flipping it" back to London and taking out a larger mortgage on his flat there. Betts denied wrongdoing, arguing the Yorkshire property had been "two dilapidated listed buildings" and that when he became a whip he had to declare his main residence as his London flat.

In 2004, he was criticised by the British Medical Association for going to Portugal with 15 fellow MPs on an all-expenses trip paid for by the fast food chain McDonald's. Betts responded that if MPs had a "puritanical" attitude about food then people would ignore what they said. He faced further criticism in 2010 after it was reported that he was one of eight MPs who were renting out a "second home" in London while claiming for the cost of renting a '"third home" in the city at taxpayers' expense. Although legal, critics argued the "loophole" was allowing MPs to increase their income after the rules on parliamentary expenses were tightened.

In 2024, one of Clive Betts' employees was accused of creating a 'racist' petition while standing for election in the South East constituency, relating to locating a traveller site in the Beighton ward. The petition drew offence for suggesting that it is inappropriate to locate a traveller site 'in the middle of a settled community', rather than 'on the city boundaries.' Betts was also later said to be 'leading his own campaign against the plan' to house travellers. He was represented by Chris Young KC in hearings against the site's location, and said that it was 'totally inappropriate', and commented that accusations of racism were 'just a knee-jerk, silly reaction to what we’re saying.'

== Personal life ==
Betts lives in a farmhouse on the Derbyshire border with his partner James Thomas, who is also employed as his parliamentary assistant. He plays cricket, supports Sheffield Wednesday F.C. and, in the past, has played squash and football and used to be a regular Sheffield Marathon runner. In March 2021, Betts became a trustee of the green space charity Fields in Trust.

Betts came out as gay in 2003 and said it was "one of the best decisions I've ever made", stating that when he was growing up "people weren't out", there was barely any gay scene and it was "hardly talked about", but that times had changed. In 2007 he was identified as one of the 50 'most powerful LGBT people in British politics', coming 35th, with his work to support the Gay and Lesbian Football Association World Championship 2008 cited by PinkNews when adding him to the list.

Betts employs his partner as his Senior Parliamentary Assistant on a salary up to £45,000. He was listed in articles in The Daily Telegraph and The Guardian which criticised the practice of MPs employing family members, on the lines that it promotes nepotism. Although MPs who were first elected in 2017 have been banned from employing family members, the restriction is not retrospective – meaning that Betts' employment of his partner is lawful.

== Notes ==
Political offices
Preceded by David Blunkett	Leader of Sheffield City Council; 1987–1992	Succeeded by Mike Bower
Parliament of the United Kingdom
Preceded by Patrick Duffy	Member of Parliament for Sheffield Attercliffe; 1992–2010	Constituency abolished
New constituency	Member of Parliament for Sheffield South East; 2010–present	Incumbent
