= Sheffield Attercliffe =

Parliamentary constituency in the United Kingdom, 1885–2010

Coordinates: 53.371°N 1.428°W

- Former borough constituency for the House of Commons
- Boundary of Sheffield Attercliffe in South Yorkshire for the 2005 general election

- Location of South Yorkshire within England
- County: South Yorkshire

1885–2010
- Created from: Sheffield
- Replaced by: Sheffield South East

Sheffield Attercliffe was a parliamentary constituency in the City of Sheffield. It was created at the 1885 general election and abolished at the 2010 general election, when it was replaced by a new Sheffield South East constituency.

== Boundaries ==
1885–1918: The Municipal Borough of Sheffield wards of Attercliffe and Park, and the civil parish of Heeley.

1918–1950: The County Borough of Sheffield wards of Attercliffe and Darnall.

1950–1955: The County Borough of Sheffield wards of Attercliffe, Darnall, and Handsworth.

1955–1974: The County Borough of Sheffield wards of Attercliffe, Darnall, Handsworth, and Tinsley.

1974–1983: The County Borough of Sheffield wards of Attercliffe, Birley, Darnall, Handsworth, and Mosborough.

1983–2010: The City of Sheffield wards of Beighton, Birley, Darnall, Handsworth, Mosborough, Richmond and Woodhouse.

Note: there were council ward boundary changes in 2004, which abolished Handsworth and created Beighton, Mosborough, Richmond and Woodhouse.

From 1997, Sheffield Attercliffe covered much of the east and south-east of the city. It bordered the constituencies of North East Derbyshire, Rotherham, Rother Valley, Sheffield Brightside, Sheffield Central and Sheffield Heeley.

== History ==
Sheffield Attercliffe constituency was created when the two-seat Sheffield constituency was split into five single-member seats in 1885.

== Members of Parliament ==
Election	Member	Party
1885	Bernard Coleridge (later Baron Coleridge)	Liberal
1894 by-election	J. Batty Langley	Liberal
1909 by-election	Joseph Pointer	Labour
1914 by-election	William Anderson	Labour
1918	Thomas Worrall Casey	Coalition Liberal
Jan 1922	Thomas Worrall Casey	National Liberal
Nov 1922	Cecil Wilson	Labour
1931	Cecil Pike	Conservative
1935	Cecil Wilson	Labour
1944 by-election	John Hynd	Labour
1970	Patrick Duffy	Labour
1992	Clive Betts	Labour
2010	constituency abolished: see Sheffield South East	

== Elections ==
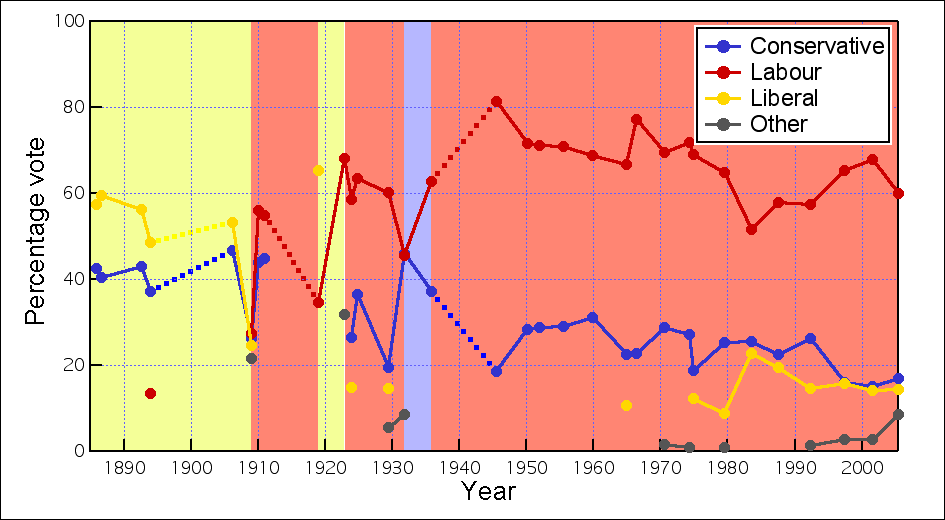
Sheffield Attercliffe election results

=== Elections in the 2000s ===
General election 2005: Sheffield Attercliffe
Party	Candidate	Votes	%	±%
Labour	Clive Betts	22,250	60.10	−7.69
Liberal Democrats	Kevin Moore	6,283	16.97	+2.76
Conservative	Tracy Critchlow	5,329	14.40	−0.80
UKIP	Jonathan Arnott	1,680	4.54	+1.74
BNP	Beverley Jones	1,477	3.99	New
Majority		15,967	43.13	
Turnout		37,019	54.59	
Labour hold		Swing	-5.22	

General election 2001: Sheffield Attercliffe
Party	Candidate	Votes	%	±%
Labour	Clive Betts	24,287	67.8	+2.5
Conservative	John Perry	5,443	15.2	−0.9
Liberal Democrats	Gail Smith	5,092	14.2	−1.5
UKIP	Pauline Arnott	1,002	2.8	New
Majority		18,844	52.6	+3.4
Turnout		35,824	52.9	−11.8
Labour hold		Swing		

=== Elections in the 1990s ===
General election 1997: Sheffield Attercliffe
Party	Candidate	Votes	%	±%
Labour	Clive Betts	28,937	65.3	+7.8
Conservative	Brendan Doyle	7,119	16.1	−10.2
Liberal Democrats	Gail Smith	6,973	15.7	+1.0
Referendum	James Brown	1,289	2.9	New
Majority		21,818	49.2	+18.0
Turnout		44,318	64.7	−7.1
Labour hold		Swing		

General election 1992: Sheffield Attercliffe
Party	Candidate	Votes	%	±%
Labour	Clive Betts	28,563	57.5	−0.3
Conservative	Gordon Millward	13,083	26.3	+3.6
Liberal Democrats	Helen Wooley	7,283	14.7	−4.8
Green	Gordon Ferguson	751	1.5	New
Majority		15,480	31.2	−3.9
Turnout		49,680	71.8	−1.1
Labour hold		Swing		

=== Elections in the 1980s ===
General election 1987: Sheffield Attercliffe
Party	Candidate	Votes	%	±%
Labour	Patrick Duffy	28,266	57.8	+6.3
Conservative	John Perry	11,975	22.7	−2.9
SDP	Helen Woolley	9,549	19.5	−3.4
Majority		17,191	35.1	+9.2
Turnout		49,790	72.9	+3.2
Labour hold		Swing		

General election 1983: Sheffield Attercliffe
Party	Candidate	Votes	%	±%
Labour	Patrick Duffy	23,067	51.5	
Conservative	Gordon Millward	11,455	25.6	
SDP	Irene Addison	10,241	22.9	
Majority		11,612	25.9	
Turnout		44,763	69.7	
Labour hold		Swing		

=== Elections in the 1970s ===
General election 1979: Sheffield Attercliffe
Party	Candidate	Votes	%	±%
Labour	Patrick Duffy	29,702	64.9	−4.1
Conservative	Douglas French	11,599	25.6	+6.9
Liberal	Dennis Boothroyd	4,017	8.8	−3.5
National Front	J. Mason	457	1.0	New
Majority		18,103	39.7	−10.6
Turnout		45,775	72.7	+5.5
Labour hold		Swing		

General election October 1974: Sheffield Attercliffe
Party	Candidate	Votes	%	±%
Labour	Patrick Duffy	29,601	69.0	−2.9
Conservative	Patricia Santhouse	8,043	18.7	−8.6
Liberal	Gerald Broadhead	5,282	12.3	New
Majority		21,558	50.3	+5.7
Turnout		42,926	67.2	−7.6
Labour hold		Swing		

General election February 1974: Sheffield Attercliffe
Party	Candidate	Votes	%	±%
Labour	Patrick Duffy	34,120	71.9	+2.3
Conservative	Patricia Santhouse	12,944	27.3	−1.6
International Marxist	Tariq Ali	424	0.9	New
Majority		21,176	44.6	+3.9
Turnout		47,488	74.8	+11.4
Labour hold		Swing		

General election 1970: Sheffield Attercliffe
Party	Candidate	Votes	%	±%
Labour	Patrick Duffy	26,482	69.6	−7.7
Conservative	Patricia Santhouse	10,986	28.9	+6.2
Independent	Percy Sims	581	1.5	New
Majority		15,496	40.7	−13.8
Turnout		38,049	63.4	−4.2
Labour hold		Swing		

=== Elections in the 1960s ===
General election 1966: Sheffield Attercliffe
Party	Candidate	Votes	%	±%
Labour	John Hynd	32,336	77.3	+10.5
Conservative	Brian Marsden	9,511	22.7	+0.2
Majority		22,825	54.6	+10.3
Turnout		41,847	67.6	−4.4
Labour hold		Swing		

General election 1964: Sheffield Attercliffe
Party	Candidate	Votes	%	±%
Labour	John Hynd	30,318	66.8	−2.0
Conservative	Herbert Lambert	10,223	22.5	−8.8
Liberal	Colin Wood	4,831	10.7	N/A
Majority		20,095	44.3	+6.8
Turnout		45,372	72.0	−3.3
Labour hold		Swing		

=== Elections in the 1950s ===
General election 1959: Sheffield Attercliffe
Party	Candidate	Votes	%	±%
Labour	John Hynd	33,676	68.8	−2.2
National Liberal	Herbert Lambert	15,304	31.2	+2.2
Majority		18,372	37.5	−4.5
Turnout		48,980	75.3	+3.2
Labour hold		Swing		

General election 1955: Sheffield Attercliffe
Party	Candidate	Votes	%	±%
Labour	John Hynd	33,071	71.0	−0.1
National Liberal	Herbert Lambert	13,503	29.0	+0.1
Majority		19,568	42.0	−0.2
Turnout		46,574	72.1	−10.6
Labour hold		Swing		

General election 1951: Sheffield Attercliffe
Party	Candidate	Votes	%	±%
Labour	John Hynd	29,958	71.1	−0.5
National Liberal	Herbert Lambert	12,161	28.9	+0.5
Majority		17,797	42.2	−1.0
Turnout		42,119	82.7	−3.7
Labour hold		Swing		

General election 1950: Sheffield Attercliffe
Party	Candidate	Votes	%	±%
Labour	John Hynd	30,726	71.6	−9.8
National Liberal	Lionel Farris	12,185	28.4	+9.8
Majority		18,541	43.2	−19.6
Turnout		42,911	86.4	+7.0
Labour hold		Swing		

=== Elections in the 1940s ===
General election 1945: Sheffield Attercliffe
Party	Candidate	Votes	%	±%
Labour	John Hynd	23,468	81.4	+18.6
Conservative	Brian Paddon	5,376	18.6	−18.6
Majority		18,092	62.8	+37.2
Turnout		28,844	79.4	+6.4
Labour hold		Swing		

The 1944 Sheffield Attercliffe by-election was called following the resignation of Cecil Henry Wilson on 9 February. John Burns Hynd of the Labour Party was elected unopposed.

=== Elections in the 1930s ===
General election 1935: Sheffield Attercliffe
Party	Candidate	Votes	%	±%
Labour	Cecil Wilson	18,663	62.8	+17.3
Conservative	Cecil Pike	11,034	37.2	−8.8
Majority		7,629	25.6	N/A
Turnout		29,697	73.0	−5.1
Labour gain from Conservative		Swing		

General election 1931: Sheffield Attercliffe
Party	Candidate	Votes	%	±%
Conservative	Cecil Pike	15,185	46.0	+26.5
Labour	Cecil Wilson	15,020	45.5	−14.8
Communist	George Fletcher	2,790	8.5	+3.0
Majority		165	0.5	N/A
Turnout		32,995	78.1	+2.7
Conservative gain from Labour		Swing		

=== Elections in the 1920s ===
General election 1929: Sheffield Attercliffe
Party	Candidate	Votes	%	±%
Labour	Cecil Wilson	19,152	60.3	−3.3
Unionist	Wilfred Barnard Faraday	6,190	19.5	−16.9
Liberal	Thomas Neville	4,652	14.7	New
Communist	George Fletcher	1,731	5.5	New
Majority		12,962	40.8	+13.6
Turnout		31,725	75.4	−0.5
Labour hold		Swing	+6.8	

General election 1924: Sheffield Attercliffe
Party	Candidate	Votes	%	±%
Labour	Cecil Wilson	16,802	63.6	+4.9
Conservative	Wilfred Barnard Faraday	9,629	36.4	+10.0
Majority		7,173	27.2	−5.1
Turnout		26,431	75.9	+9.1
Labour hold		Swing		

General election 1923: Sheffield Attercliffe
Party	Candidate	Votes	%	±%
Labour	Cecil Wilson	13,581	58.7	−9.5
Unionist	George Terrell	6,106	26.4	New
Liberal	Harry Briggs	3,438	14.9	−16.9
Majority		7,475	32.3	−4.1
Turnout		23,125	66.8	−1.8
Labour hold		Swing		

General election 1922: Sheffield Attercliffe
Party	Candidate	Votes	%	±%
Labour	Cecil Wilson	16,206	68.2	+33.5
National Liberal	Thomas Worrall Casey	7,562	31.8	−33.5
Majority		8,644	36.4	N/A
Turnout		23,768	68.6	+16.1
Labour gain from National Liberal		Swing	+33.5	

=== Elections in the 1910s ===
Thomas Casey

General election 1918: Sheffield Attercliffe
Party		Candidate	Votes	%	±%
C	National Liberal	Thomas Worrall Casey	12,308	65.3	New
	Labour	William Anderson	6,539	34.7	−20.3
Majority			5,769	30.6	N/A
Turnout			18,847	52.5	−19.6
	National Liberal gain from Labour		Swing		
C indicates candidate endorsed by the coalition government.

By-election, 1914: Sheffield Attercliffe
Party	Candidate	Votes	%	±%
Labour	William Anderson	Unopposed		
Labour hold				

General election December 1910: Sheffield Attercliffe
Party	Candidate	Votes	%	±%
Labour	Joseph Pointer	6,532	55.0	−1.1
Conservative	Samuel Walker	5,354	45.0	+1.1
Majority		1,178	10.0	−2.2
Turnout		11,886	72.1	−11.8
Registered electors		16,483		
Labour hold		Swing	−1.1	

General election January 1910: Sheffield Attercliffe
Party	Candidate	Votes	%	±%
Labour	Joseph Pointer	7,755	56.1	N/A
Conservative	Sydney King-Farlow	6,079	43.9	−2.9
Majority		1,676	12.2	N/A
Turnout		13,834	83.9	+4.7
Registered electors		16,483		
Labour gain from Liberal		Swing	N/A	

=== Elections in the 1900s ===
1909 Sheffield Attercliffe by-election
Party	Candidate	Votes	%	±%
Labour	Joseph Pointer	3,531	27.5	New
Conservative	Sydney Charles King-Farlow	3,380	26.2	−20.6
Liberal	Richard Cornthwaite Lambert	3,175	24.6	−28.6
Ind. Conservative	Arnold Muir Wilson	2,803	21.7	New
Majority		151	1.3	N/A
Turnout		12,889	77.3	−1.9
Registered electors		16,676		
Labour gain from Liberal		Swing		

General election 1906: Sheffield Attercliffe
Party	Candidate	Votes	%	±%
Liberal	J. Batty Langley	6,523	53.2	N/A
Conservative	Arnold Muir Wilson	5,736	46.8	New
Majority		787	6.4	N/A
Turnout		12,259	79.2	N/A
Registered electors		15,484		
Liberal hold		Swing	N/A	

1900 general election: Sheffield Attercliffe
Party	Candidate	Votes	%	±%
Liberal	J. Batty Langley	Unopposed		
Liberal hold				

=== Elections in the 1890s ===
General election 1895: Sheffield Attercliffe
Party	Candidate	Votes	%	±%
Liberal	J. Batty Langley	Unopposed		
Liberal hold				

This by-election was called due to the resignation on 26 June of Bernard John Seymour Coleridge following his inheritance of the title of Baron Coleridge.

J. Batty Langley

By-election, 5 Jul 1894: Sheffield Attercliffe
Party	Candidate	Votes	%	±%
Liberal	J. Batty Langley	4,486	48.6	−7.7
Conservative	George Hill Smith	3,495	37.9	−5.8
Ind. Labour Party	Frank Smith	1,249	13.5	New
Majority		991	10.7	−1.9
Turnout		9,230	79.0	−1.2
Registered electors		11,684		
Liberal hold		Swing	−1.0	

General election 1892: Sheffield Attercliffe
Party	Candidate	Votes	%	±%
Liberal	Bernard Coleridge	5,107	56.3	−3.3
Conservative	George Hill Smith	3,963	43.7	+3.3
Majority		1,144	12.6	−6.6
Turnout		9,070	80.2	+5.1
Registered electors		11,313		
Liberal hold		Swing	−3.3	

=== Elections in the 1880s ===
General election 1886: Sheffield Attercliffe
Party	Candidate	Votes	%	±%
Liberal	Bernard Coleridge	4,365	59.6	+2.2
Liberal Unionist	Frederick William Maude	2,958	40.4	−2.2
Majority		1,407	19.2	+4.4
Turnout		7,323	75.1	−12.3
Registered electors		9,751		
Liberal hold		Swing	+2.2	

General election 1885: Sheffield Attercliffe
Party	Candidate	Votes	%
Liberal	Bernard Coleridge	4,891	57.4
Conservative	Edward Brodie Hoare	3,633	42.6
Majority		1,258	14.8
Turnout		8,524	87.4
Registered electors		9,751	
Liberal win (new seat)			

== See also ==
- List of parliamentary constituencies in South Yorkshire

== Sources ==
- BBC News, Election 2005
- BBC News, Vote 2001
- Guardian Unlimited Politics
- Leigh Rayment's Historical List of MPs – Constituencies beginning with "A" (part 3)
- Politicsresources.net - Official Web Site ✔ (Election results from 1951 to the present)
- F. W. S. Craig, British Parliamentary Election Results 1918 - 1949
- F. W. S. Craig, British Parliamentary Election Results 1950 - 1970
- Sheffield General Election Results 1945 - 2001, Sheffield City Council
