= 1939 Colne Valley by-election =

UK parliamentary by-election

The 1939 Colne Valley by-election was a parliamentary by-election held on 27 July 1939 for the British House of Commons constituency of Colne Valley.

== Previous MP ==
Ernest Marklew, who had been a Councillor in Grimsby, was first elected as MP for Colne Valley in 1935 when he gained the seat from the Liberal Party. He died on 14 June 1939, forcing a by-election on the Labour Party.

== Previous election ==
General election, 14 November 1935
Party	Candidate	Votes	%	±%
Labour	Ernest Marklew	16,725	39.5	
Liberal	Lance Mallalieu	12,946	30.6	
Conservative	M.G. Crofton	10,917	25.8	
Independent	W.G. Bagnall	1,754	4.1	
Majority		3,779	8.9	N/A
Turnout		42,342	76.0	
Labour gain from Liberal		Swing		

== Candidates ==
The Labour Party selected 52-year-old Glenvil Hall to defend the seat. He had been Labour MP for Portsmouth Central from 1929 to 1931. The Liberal Party selected 34-year-old Lance Mallalieu to fight the seat. He had been the MP for the seat from 1931 until defeated by Marklew at the last General Election in 1935. The Conservative Party selected 41-year-old Cecil Pike as their new candidate. He had been Conservative MP for Sheffield Attercliffe from 1931 to 1935.

== Result ==
Colne Valley by-election, 1939
Party	Candidate	Votes	%	±%
Labour	Glenvil Hall	17,277	48.6	+6.3
Liberal	Lance Mallalieu	9,228	26.0	−4.6
Conservative	Cecil Frederick Pike	9,012	25.4	−0.4
Majority		8,049	22.6	+13.7
Turnout		35,517		
Labour hold		Swing		

== Aftermath ==
Hall continued as MP for Colne Valley until his death in 1962. He served as Financial Secretary to the Treasury in the 1945-50 Labour government. Mallalieu left the Liberal Party for Labour before being elected Labour MP for Brigg in 1948. Pike did not contest another election.

General election, 5 July 1945
Party	Candidate	Votes	%	±%
Labour	Glenvil Hall	23,488	54.7	
Conservative	S. Smith	11,593	27.0	
Liberal	G. K. Lawrence	7,890	18.3	
Majority		11,895	27.7	
Turnout		42,971	79.2	
Labour hold		Swing		
