= Joseph Pointer =

British Labour Party Member of Parliament and patternmaker

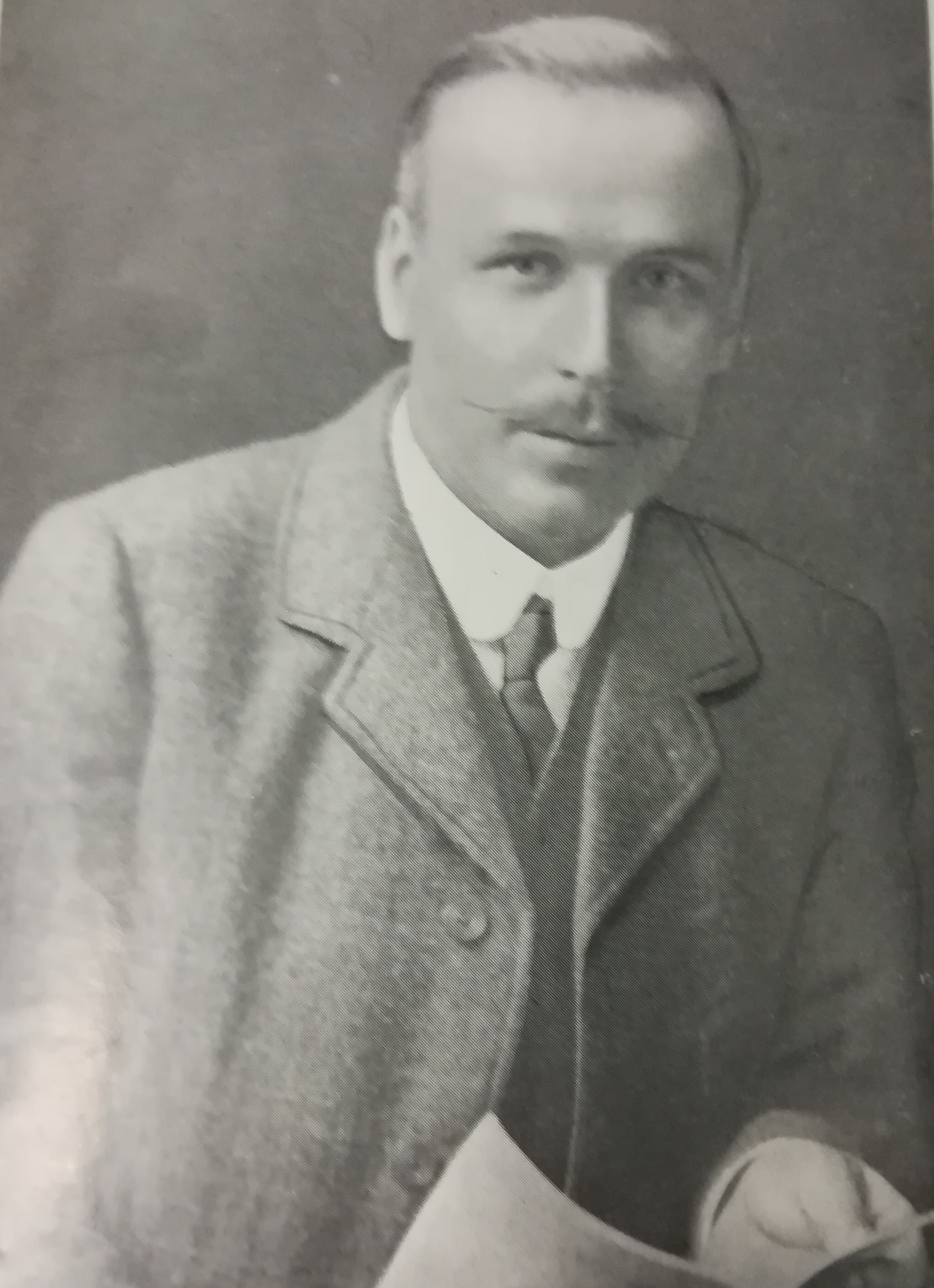
Pointer in the 1910s

Joseph Pointer (12 June 1875 – 19 November 1914) was a patternmaker who became a British Labour Party Member of Parliament.

Born in the Attercliffe district of Sheffield, Pointer became a convinced socialist early in his life, and joined the Independent Labour Party. He attended Ruskin College in Oxford for six months to study Constitutional History and Sociology.

On his return to Sheffield, Pointer took part in a strike, and was thereafter unable to gain regular employment. He was nonetheless elected Chair of the Sheffield Trades Council, and stood unsuccessfully for Sheffield City Council in 1906 and 1907. In 1908, he was finally elected for the Brightside ward.

In 1909, J. Batty Langley, Liberal Party MP for Sheffield Attercliffe died, and Pointer stood for the Labour Party in the ensuing by-election. With the non Labour vote divided between the Liberal candidate, and both official and unofficial Conservative Party candidates, Pointer achieved a narrow victory, becoming Sheffield's first Labour MP. He held the seat in both the January and December 1910 general elections, which the Liberal Party did not contest.

In the House of Commons, Pointer was appointed as a junior whip, but died in Sheffield in 1914 aged 39.

Parliament of the United Kingdom
| Preceded by J. Batty Langley | Member of Parliament for Sheffield Attercliffe; 1909–1914 | Succeeded by William Anderson |
