= Arnold Muir Wilson =

British solicitor and politician

Arnold Muir Wilson (1857 – 1 October 1909) was a British solicitor and politician.

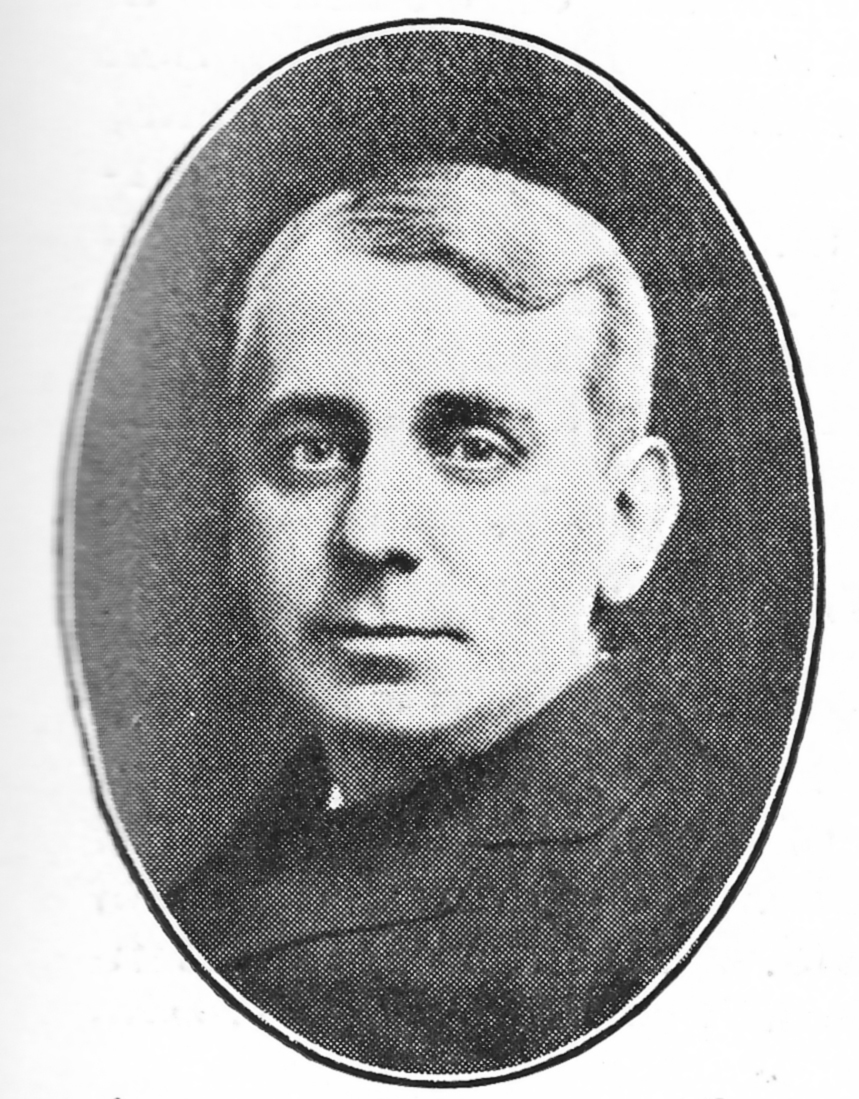
Arnold Muir Wilson, 1857-1909

Born in Sheffield, Wilson studied in the German Empire before becoming a solicitor based at Clifford's Inn. He built up a large practice in Sheffield, usually representing the defence at the Police Court, against Arthur Neal. He was a key figure in the formation of an Amateur Parliament in the city, and in 1883 he was elected to Sheffield City Council for the Conservative Party. He was also known as an early motorist and mountaineer.

In 1891, Wilson objected to an attack on him in the Sheffield Anarchist, and successfully sued its editor, John Creaghe, for libel. Although he won the case, no damages were awarded, as the judge contended that the newspaper could inflict injury only on those who read it.

In 1898, Wilson was appointed as an honorary consul for Serbia, and he attempted to use the position to promote British trade with the nation. In 1904, he travelled to Belgrade and worked with Frank Storm Mottershaw to film the coronation of Peter I. This is the oldest surviving film shot in Serbia.

In the 1900s, Wilson became known for his outspoken attacks on well-known figures in Sheffield. When Lib-Lab councillor Charles Hobson appeared to have received a bribe for making a favourable land deal, Wilson brought a private prosecution against him. Hobson was found guilty and sentenced to three months in prison, but public opinion was that the sentence was harsh.

Wilson stood for the Conservatives in Sheffield Attercliffe at the 1906 general election, taking 46.8% of the vote. In 1907, he began a lengthy trip around the world. Despite this, he objected to the nomination of an alternative Conservative candidate in the 1909 Sheffield Attercliffe by-election, and ensured that he was nominated as an independent Conservative. He returned to Sheffield to campaign on a protectionist platform, under the slogan "Vote for the Tory Chicken!! Kill the London Cuckoo!!". He took a strong fourth place, with 21.7% of the votes cast. The week after the election, he called a public meeting, at which he complained that he had spent £1,100 on contesting the 1906 and 1909 elections, and that "if that is not enough to buy the seat of Attercliffe, I don't know what is". Later in the month, he sued the Conservative candidate for assault on the election night, and for damage to his bowler hat, but the case was dismissed before he was able to give evidence.

Wilson died in October 1909, in Vancouver. His daughter became a prominent author under the pen-name Romer Wilson, while his great-nephew was the author and journalist Roger Redfern.
