= Sidebottom =

Sidebottom is a surname of Old English origin (see Surname Database), and may refer to:

- Allan Sidebottom (born 1959), former Australian rules footballer
- Arnie Sidebottom (born 1954), England cricketer, father of Ryan
- Garry Sidebottom (1954–2019), former Australian rules football player
- Geoff Sidebottom (1936–2008), English professional footballer who played as goalkeeper
- Harry Sidebottom, British author, scholar and historian
- James Sidebottom (1824–1871), British businessman and Conservative Party politician
- John K. Sidebottom OBE (1880–1954), British philatelist
- Ryan Sidebottom (born 1978), former England international cricketer
- Ryan Sidebottom (Australian cricketer) (born 1989), Australian cricketer
- Sid Sidebottom (born 1951), Australian former politician
- Steele Sidebottom (born 1991), professional Australian rules football player
- Tom Harrop Sidebottom (1826–1908), British businessman and Conservative Party politician who represented Stalybridge
- Walter Sidebottom (1921–1943), English footballer
- William Sidebottom (cricketer) (1862–1948), Australian cricketer
- William Sidebottom (English politician) (1841–1933), English Conservative politician who represented High Peak
- William Sidebottom (RAF officer) DFC (1893–1920), British World War I flying ace credited with fourteen aerial victories

== See also ==
- Sidebotham
- Sidebottom v Kershaw, Leese & Co Ltd, a UK company law case, concerning the alteration of a company's constitution, and the rights of a minority shareholder
