= 1871 Stalybridge by-election =

UK Parliamentary by-election

The 1871 Stalybridge by-election was held on 1 March 1871, due to the death of the incumbent MP of the Conservative Party, James Sidebottom. It was won by the Liberal candidate Nathaniel Buckley.
