= Christopher Woodhouse =

Christopher Woodhouse may refer to:

- Montague Woodhouse, 5th Baron Terrington, full name Christopher Montague Woodhouse, (1917–2001), Conservative MP
- Christopher Woodhouse, 6th Baron Terrington (born 1946), urologist and son of the former

== See also ==
- Chris Woodhouse
