= Harpreet Uppal =

British politician and campaigner

Harpreet Uppal MP
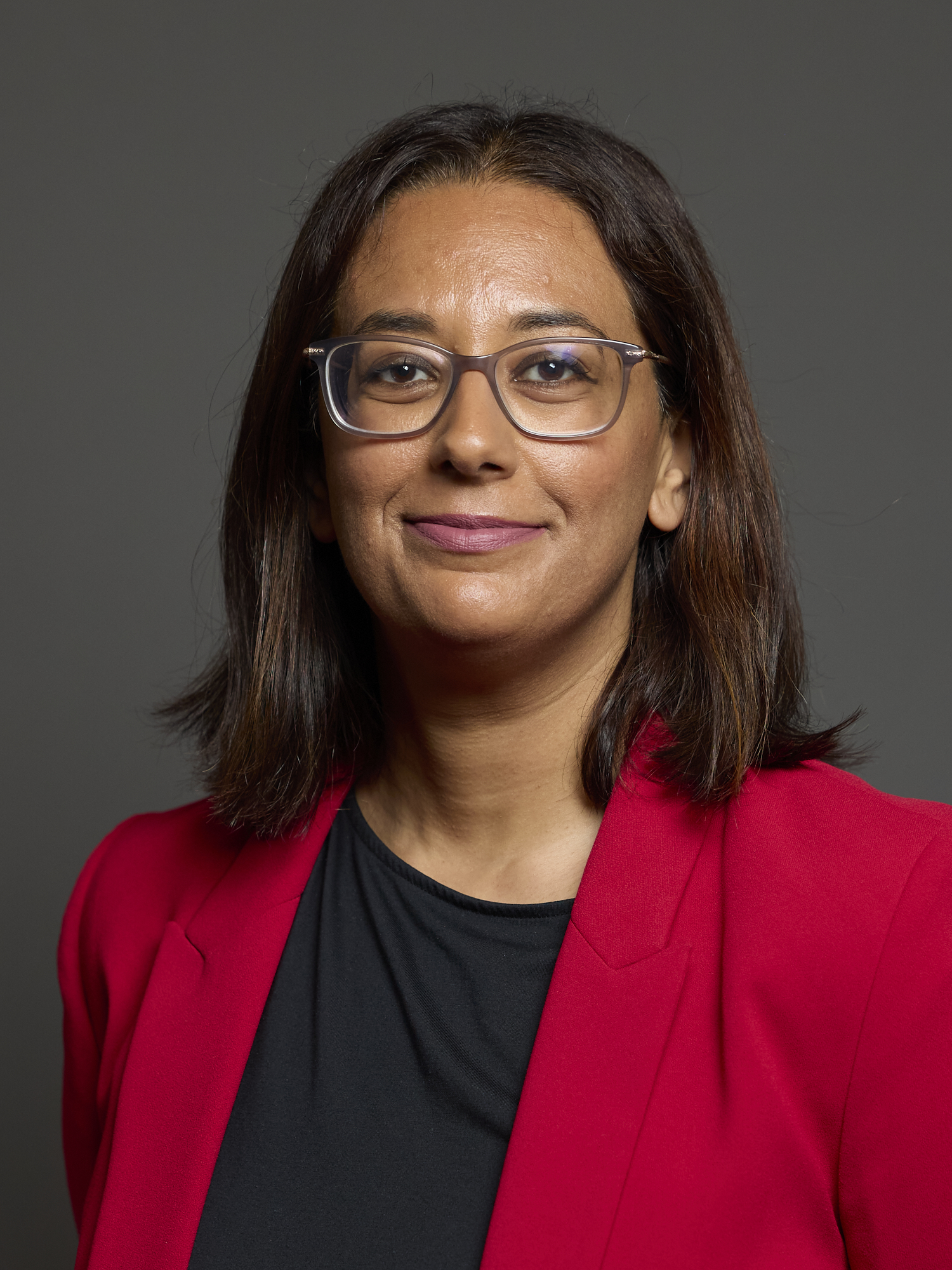
- Official portrait, 2024

Member of Parliament for Huddersfield
- Incumbent
- Assumed office 4 July 2024
- Preceded by: Barry Sheerman
- Majority: 4,533 (11.3%)

Member of Kirklees Council
- In office May 2018 – May 2022

Personal details
- Born: Harpreet Kaur Uppal Huddersfield, West Yorkshire, England
- Party: Labour
- Education: Nottingham Trent University (BA); University of Bradford (MA)
- Website: harpreet4huddersfield.com

Harpreet Kaur Uppal is a British Labour Party politician who has served as the Member of Parliament (MP) for Huddersfield since 2024.

== Early life and education ==
Uppal was born in Fartown, Huddersfield, she attended Fartown High School where she sat on the student council. She took politics at A-Level at Greenhead College. She studied politics at Nottingham Trent University and went on to do a master's degree in international politics at Bradford.

== Career ==
Uppal has been employed as Deputy Chief of Staff for Debbie Abrahams MP and she also worked on Andy Burnham's campaign to become Mayor of Manchester in 2017; he later endorsed her run for parliament.

Uppal was elected to Kirklees Council as a councillor for Ashbrow ward in May 2018 and stepped down in May 2022. During her time on the council she was the chair of the Economy and Neighbourhood Scrutiny Panel.

In July 2022, Harpreet Uppal was selected by the Huddersfield local Labour party as their candidate for the next general election; this was later called to take place on 4 July 2024. She won the seat with 37.6% of the vote.

Harpreet Uppal was Parliamentary Private Secretary to the Deputy Prime Minister Angela Rayner from 19 July 2024 to 11 September 2025.

Harpreet Uppal was appointed Assistant Whip on 22 July 2026.

== Personal life ==
Harpreet Uppal is a Sikh.

Parliament of the United Kingdom
Preceded by Barry Sheerman	Member of Parliament for Huddersfield; 2024–present	Incumbent
