= Fartown =

Fartown may refer to:

- Fartown Ground, Huddersfield
- Fartown, Huddersfield
- Fartown, Pudsey

- Fartown was the nickname of Huddersfield Giants rugby league team.
