= Huddersfield East =

Parliamentary constituency in the United Kingdom, 1950–1983

Coordinates: 53.647°N 1.7734°W

- Former borough constituency for the House of Commons

1950–1983
- Seats: One
- Created from: Huddersfield
- Replaced by: Huddersfield and Dewsbury

Huddersfield East was a constituency of the House of Commons of the Parliament of the United Kingdom from 1950 until 1983.

== Boundaries ==
1950–1955: The County Borough of Huddersfield wards of Almondbury, Dalton, Deighton, Fartown, Newsome, North Central, and South Central.

1955–1983: The County Borough of Huddersfield wards of Almondbury, Dalton, Deighton, Fartown, North Central, and South Central, and the Urban District of Kirkburton.

The constituency included Huddersfield itself.

In 1966, 4.1% of the constituency was born in the New Commonwealth.

== Members of Parliament ==
| Election | Member | Party |
|---|---|---|
| 1950 | Joseph Mallalieu | Labour |
| 1979 | Barry Sheerman | Labour |
| 1983 | constituency abolished: see Huddersfield | |

Joseph Mallalieu had been Member of Parliament for Huddersfield from 1945 to 1950, when the constituency was abolished. When the Huddersfield constituency was recreated, Barry Sheerman became the new Member of Parliament.

== Elections ==
=== Elections in the 1950s ===
General election 1950: Huddersfield East
| Party | Candidate | Votes | % | ±% |
|---|---|---|---|---|
| Labour | Joseph Mallalieu | 22,296 | 56.6 | |
| Conservative | John Smith | 17,063 | 43.4 | |
| Majority | | 5,233 | 13.2 | |
| Turnout | | 39,359 | | |
| Labour win (new seat) | | | | |

General election 1951: Huddersfield East
| Party | Candidate | Votes | % | ±% |
|---|---|---|---|---|
| Labour | Joseph Mallalieu | 22,368 | 55.7 | −0.9 |
| Conservative | John Smith | 17,799 | 44.3 | +0.9 |
| Majority | | 4,569 | 11.4 | −1.8 |
| Turnout | | 40,167 | | |
| Labour hold | | Swing | | |

General election 1955: Huddersfield East
| Party | Candidate | Votes | % | ±% |
|---|---|---|---|---|
| Labour | Joseph Mallalieu | 22,835 | 55.1 | −0.6 |
| Conservative | Douglas Clift | 18,611 | 44.9 | +0.6 |
| Majority | | 4,224 | 10.2 | −1.2 |
| Turnout | | 41,446 | | |
| Labour hold | | Swing | | |

General election 1959: Huddersfield East
| Party | Candidate | Votes | % | ±% |
|---|---|---|---|---|
| Labour | Joseph Mallalieu | 22,474 | 53.7 | −1.4 |
| Conservative | Paul Michael Beard | 19,389 | 46.3 | +1.4 |
| Majority | | 3,085 | 7.4 | −2.8 |
| Turnout | | 41,863 | | |
| Labour hold | | Swing | | |

=== Elections in the 1960s ===
General election 1964: Huddersfield East
| Party | Candidate | Votes | % | ±% |
|---|---|---|---|---|
| Labour | Joseph Mallalieu | 20,501 | 51.0 | −2.7 |
| Conservative | James Fergusson | 12,332 | 30.4 | −15.9 |
| Liberal | Bernard Jennings | 7,494 | 18.6 | New |
| Majority | | 8,269 | 20.6 | +13.2 |
| Turnout | | 40,327 | | |
| Labour hold | | Swing | | |

General election 1966: Huddersfield East
| Party | Candidate | Votes | % | ±% |
|---|---|---|---|---|
| Labour | Joseph Mallalieu | 21,960 | 55.8 | +4.8 |
| Conservative | James Fergusson | 11,081 | 28.2 | −2.2 |
| Liberal | George Malcolm Lee | 6,303 | 16.0 | −2.6 |
| Majority | | 10,879 | 27.6 | +7.0 |
| Turnout | | 39,344 | | |
| Labour hold | | Swing | | |

=== Elections in the 1970s ===
General election 1970: Huddersfield East
| Party | Candidate | Votes | % | ±% |
|---|---|---|---|---|
| Labour | Joseph Mallalieu | 20,629 | 50.2 | −5.6 |
| Conservative | John Holt | 15,632 | 38.0 | +9.8 |
| Liberal | George Malcolm Lee | 4,569 | 11.1 | −4.9 |
| Communist | Ethel Beresford | 308 | 0.75 | New |
| Majority | | 4,997 | 12.2 | −15.4 |
| Turnout | | 41,138 | | |
| Labour hold | | Swing | | |

General election February 1974: Huddersfield East
| Party | Candidate | Votes | % | ±% |
|---|---|---|---|---|
| Labour | Joseph Mallalieu | 20,224 | 47.3 | −2.9 |
| Conservative | Cyril Taylor | 12,920 | 30.2 | −7.8 |
| Liberal | George Malcolm Lee | 8,530 | 20.0 | +8.9 |
| National Front | N Mear | 796 | 1.9 | New |
| Communist | A Drake | 246 | 0.6 | −0.1 |
| Majority | | 7,304 | 17.10 | +4.9 |
| Turnout | | 42,716 | | |
| Labour hold | | Swing | | |

General election October 1974: Huddersfield East
| Party | Candidate | Votes | % | ±% |
|---|---|---|---|---|
| Labour | Joseph Mallalieu | 19,522 | 50.4 | +3.1 |
| Conservative | AFJ Povey | 11,108 | 28.7 | +1.5 |
| Liberal | George Malcolm Lee | 7,326 | 18.9 | −1.1 |
| National Front | J Robertshaw | 764 | 2.0 | +0.1 |
| Majority | | 8,414 | 21.7 | +4.6 |
| Turnout | | 38,720 | | |
| Labour hold | | Swing | | |

General election 1979: Huddersfield East
| Party | Candidate | Votes | % | ±% |
|---|---|---|---|---|
| Labour Co-op | Barry Sheerman | 19,040 | 47.5 | −2.9 |
| Conservative | M Bendelow | 15,945 | 39.7 | +11.0 |
| Liberal | G MacPherson | 4,890 | 12.2 | −6.7 |
| Independent | H Hirst | 243 | 0.6 | New |
| Majority | | 3,095 | 7.8 | −13.9 |
| Turnout | | 40,118 | | |
| Labour Co-op hold | | Swing | | |
