= William Mabane, 1st Baron Mabane =

British businessman and politician (1895–1969)

The Right Honourable The Lord Mabane KBE PC
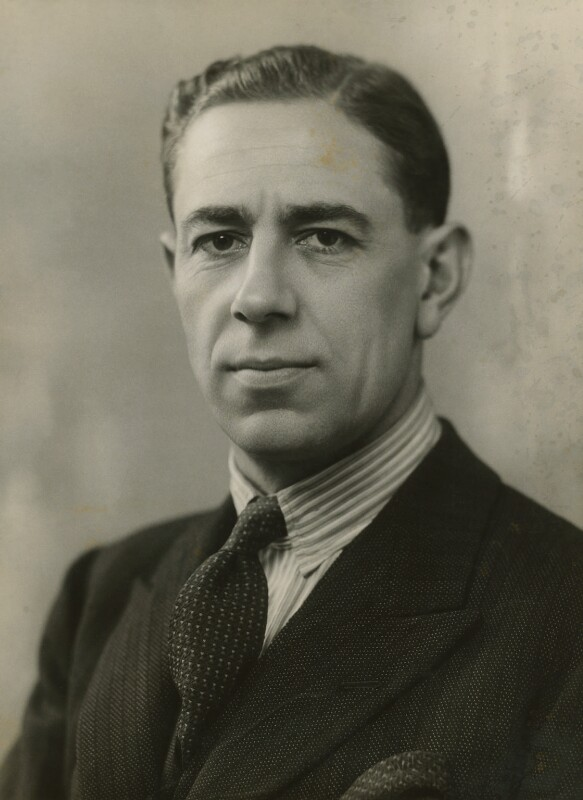
- Mabane in 1934

Minister of State for Foreign Affairs
- In office 25 May 1945 – 26 July 1945
- Monarch: George VI
- Prime Minister: Winston Churchill
- Preceded by: Richard Law
- Succeeded by: Philip Noel-Baker

Personal details
- Born: 12 January 1895
- Died: 16 November 1969 (aged 74)
- Spouse(s): (1) Louise Tanton (2) Stella Duggan
- Education: Gonville and Caius College, Cambridge

William Mabane, 1st Baron Mabane KBE PC (12 January 1895 – 16 November 1969), known as Sir William Mabane between 1954 and 1962, was a British businessman and Liberal/National Liberal politician.

== Background and education ==
The son of Joseph Greenwood Mabane and Margaret (née Steele) of Leeds, he was educated at Woodhouse Grove School and at Gonville and Caius College, Cambridge. He was commissioned in 1914 and served in the Near East and France in World War I as a captain with the East Yorkshire Regiment; he was wounded and mentioned in despatches. He later became a businessman and merchant.

== Political career ==
Mabane was elected Member of Parliament (MP) for Huddersfield in 1931 and lost his seat in 1945. Mabane's exact party label was confused for much of his time in the Commons. His local Liberal association was affiliated to the official Liberals until 1939, but Mabane was frequently listed as being a National Liberal, which he repeatedly sought to deny, despite supporting the National Government when the official Liberals had ceased to. He lost his seat to Labour in 1945, when he was opposed by an official Liberal candidate, Roy Harrod. The standard authoritative work by F. W. S. Craig indicates he was a National Liberal throughout his tenure, as does the contemporary Times Guide to the House of Commons. The town remained an area of strength for liberals and at the 1950 general election, the Liberal Donald Wade won Huddersfield West in a straight fight against Labour.

He entered the government as Assistant Postmaster-General under Neville Chamberlain in September 1939, an office he only held until October, when he was made Minister for Home Security. When Winston Churchill succeeded Chamberlain as prime minister in May 1940, Mabane was appointed Parliamentary Secretary to the Home Department, a post he held jointly with Ellen Wilkinson from October of that year. He later served under Churchill as Parliamentary Secretary to the Ministry of Food from 1942 to 1945 and as Minister of State for Foreign Affairs between May and July 1945.

He was sworn of the Privy Council in the 1944 New Year Honours and a Knight Commander of the Order of the British Empire (KBE) in 1954. In 1962 he was raised to the peerage as Baron Mabane, of Rye in the County of Sussex. He was tenant of Lamb House, the National Trust property in Rye, East Sussex.

Apart from his political career he was also chairman (1960–1963) and president (1964–1966) of the British Travel Association. He was a director of The Rank Organisation from 1963 to 1966.

== Personal life ==
Lord Mabane was twice married. He married firstly Louise, daughter of E. Tanton, in 1918. They were divorced in 1926. He married secondly Stella Jane, daughter of J. Duggan, in 1944. He died in November 1969, aged 74. As he was childless, the barony became extinct upon his death.

Parliament of the United Kingdom
Preceded by James Hudson	Member of Parliament for Huddersfield; 1931–1945	Succeeded by Joseph Mallalieu
Political offices
Preceded by Walter Womersley	Assistant Postmaster-General; September 1940 – October 1940	Succeeded by Charles Waterhouse
Preceded by Alan Lennox-Boyd	Minister for Home Security; 1939–1940	Succeeded by Sir John Anderson
Unknown	Parliamentary Secretary to the Home Department; May 1940 – June 1942; With: Ellen Wilkinson October 1940 – June 1942	Succeeded by Ellen Wilkinson
Preceded by Gwilym Lloyd George	Parliamentary Secretary to the Ministry of Food; 1942–1945	Succeeded by Florence Horsbrugh
Preceded by Richard Law	Minister of State for Foreign Affairs; 1945	Succeeded by Philip Noel-Baker
Peerage of the United Kingdom
New creation	Baron Mabane; 1962–1969	Extinct
