= Edward Leatham =

English politician

Edward Aldam Leatham (2 August 1828 – 6 February 1900) was an English academic and Liberal Party politician, Member of Parliament for Huddersfield.

== Background and early life ==
Leatham was the son of banker William Leatham of Heath near Wakefield, by his wife Margaret Walker, daughter and heiress of Joshua Walker, of York. The family was part of an influential Quaker community in Yorkshire, one of which had been imprisoned for her religious views. His brother William Henry Leatham was MP for Wakefield and Southern West Riding, and his sister Margaret Elizabeth Leatham married the liberal statesman John Bright. He was educated at University College London, graduating BA in 1848 and MA in 1851 with a distinction which led to his election as a Fellow of the college.

== Political career ==
Leatham was narrowly elected MP for Huddersfield at the 1859 General Election, winning the representation from Edward Akroyd, "whose Liberalism was of a more Whiggish type" and there was an attempt to unseat him. His victory was celebrated at a banquet at which John Bright, Richard Cobden, Frank Crossley, Baines and others were present. In 1861 he instituted the Huddersfield College Prize Medals for history and English declamation which were awarded for the two subjects in alternate years.

In July 1865 he was defeated by Colonel Crosland who died in 1868 and Leatham won the ensuing by-election with a large majority over William Campbell Sleigh. He held the seat until his retirement in 1886. He supported disestablishment of the Church, undenominational education and was opposed to Home Rule.

In 1875, he acquired an estate at Miserden, Gloucestershire. He was a justice of the peace and deputy lieutenant for the West Riding of Yorkshire, and later a deputy lieutenant for Gloucestershire, of which county he was high sheriff in 1891.

He was a scholar and published a historical romance Charmione: A Tale of the Great Athenian Revolution in 1858. His politics was heavily influenced by his brother-in-law Bright's ideas. For example, Leatham introduced the bill that would become the Ballot Act 1872.

Leatham died at his residence at Miserden, on 6 February 1900 aged 71.

== Family ==
Leatham was twice married. He first married a sister of Bright, Mary Jane Fowler of Melksham in 1851. Following her death, he married a daughter of Rev. John Constable, and she survived him. His eldest son was Arthur William Leatham. By his first wife, Leatham had four sons and four daughters; by the second, four sons and three daughters.

Parliament of the United Kingdom
Preceded by Edward Akroyd	Member of Parliament for Huddersfield; 1859–1865	Succeeded by Thomas Crosland
Preceded by Thomas Crosland	Member of Parliament for Huddersfield; 1868–1886	Succeeded by William Summers
Honorary titles
Preceded by James Roberts West	High Sheriff of Gloucestershire; 1891–1892	Succeeded by John Reginald Yorke
