= William Leatham =

William Leatham may refer to:

- William Leatham (banker) (1785–1842), British banker, Quaker and abolitionist
- William Henry Leatham (1815–1889), his son, British banker, poet and Liberal politician
