= Baron Terrington =

Barony in the Peerage of the United Kingdom

Baron Terrington, of Huddersfield in the County of York, is a title in the Peerage of the United Kingdom. It was created in 1918 for the former Liberal Member of Parliament for Huddersfield, Sir James Woodhouse, Kt. He was succeeded by his eldest son, the second Baron. His wife Vera Woodhouse, Lady Terrington, was one of the first female Members of Parliament. She represented Wycombe as a Liberal from 1923 to 1924. On the second Baron's death the titles passed to his younger brother, the third Baron. He notably served as a Deputy Speaker and Deputy Chairman of Committees in the House of Lords. His son, the fourth Baron, was also Deputy Chairman of Committees in the House of Lords. He had no sons and was succeeded by his younger brother, the fifth Baron. Known as Monty Woodhouse, he was a Conservative politician and an expert on Greek affairs. As of 2016 the titles are held by his eldest son, the sixth Baron, who succeeded in 2001. He is a urologist.

== Barons Terrington (1918) ==
- James Thomas Woodhouse, 1st Baron Terrington (1852–1921)
- Harold James Selborne Woodhouse, 2nd Baron Terrington (1877–1940)
- Horace Marton Woodhouse, 3rd Baron Terrington (1887–1961)
- (James Allen) David Woodhouse, 4th Baron Terrington (1915–1998)
- (Christopher) Montague Woodhouse, 5th Baron Terrington (1917–2001)
- Christopher Richard James Woodhouse, 6th Baron Terrington (born 1946)

The heir apparent is the present holder's son, the Hon. Jack Henry Lehmann Woodhouse (born 1978).

=== Title succession chart ===
Title succession chart, Barons Terrington

James Woodhouse; 1st Baron Terrington; 1852–1921
Harold Woodhouse; 2nd Baron Terrington; 1877–1940	Horace Woodhouse; 3rd Baron Terrington; 1887–1961
David Woodhouse; 4th Baron Terrington; 1915–1998	Montague Woodhouse; 5th Baron Terrington; 1917–2001
Christopher Woodhouse; 6th Baron Terrington born 1946
Hon. Jack Woodhouse born 1978

== Arms ==
Coat of arms of Baron Terrington
Crest Issuant out of a wreath of roses Argent barbed and seeded Proper a demi-woodman also Proper supporting in the dexter hand an axe Or. Escutcheon Per fess Or and Azure a hurst of oak trees issuant in chief Proper and two bars wavy in base Argent. Supporters On either side an Airedale terrier Proper gorged with a ducal coronet Or. Motto Labor Omnia Vincit
