= 1906 Huddersfield by-election =

UK parliamentary by-election

← 1906	28 November 1906	Jan. 1910 →

Candidate	Sherwell	Williams	Fraser
Party	Liberal	Labour	Conservative
Popular vote	5,762	5,422	4,844
Percentage	36.0%	33.8%	30.2%
MP before election
Sir James Woodhouse
Liberal
Subsequent MP
Arthur Sherwell
Liberal

The 1906 Huddersfield by-election was a Parliamentary by-election held on 28 November 1906. The constituency returned one Member of Parliament (MP) to the House of Commons of the United Kingdom, elected by the first past the post voting system.

== Vacancy ==
Sir James Woodhouse had been Liberal MP here since the 1895 general election. He resigned upon his appointment as the Rail and Canal Traffic Commissioner.

== Electoral history ==
The seat had been Liberal since Woodhouse re-gained it in 1895. It had been a marginal seat, but Woodhouse had won with a bit to spare in 1895 and 1900. He narrowly held the seat at the last election after the intervention of a Labour candidate.

Woodhouse

General election 1906 Huddersfield
Party	Candidate	Votes	%	±%
Liberal	James Woodhouse	6,302	38.2	−15.4
Labour Repr. Cmte.	T. Russell Williams	5,813	35.2	New
Conservative	John Foster Fraser	4,391	26.6	−19.8
Majority		489	3.0	−4.2
Turnout		16,506	94.0	+6.2
Registered electors		17,568		
Liberal hold		Swing	+2.2	

== Candidates ==
The local Liberal Association selected the 43-year-old temperance campaigner Arthur Sherwell to defend the seat. The Conservatives retained the 38-year-old journalist John Foster Fraser as their candidate. The 37-year-old Thomas Russell Williams, who had stood as a candidate of the Labour Representation Committee, at the general election also stood again but this time as the candidate of the Labour Party. Although raised in Huddersfield, he worked as a mill manager in Keighley.

== Campaign ==
Polling day was fixed for 28 November 1906. The Conservative and Labour challengers started with an advantage, as their names were known from having contested the constituency nine months earlier. The Liberals had received a setback, losing Cockermouth to the Conservatives in a by-election three months earlier. Liberal candidates in other by-elections had also seen their vote share fall from the party's general election high point. In Huddersfield, since the general election, the Liberal association had undergone reorganisation and had substantially increased its membership. Williams, the Labour candidate, was regarded as a quasi-Marxist socialist and struggled to relate his stances to local trade unionists, who wanted firm policy commitments from him. Sherwell, the Liberal candidate, supported giving women the vote. However, the Women's Social and Political Union set up a local campaign office to campaign against him.

== Result ==
The Liberals held the seat with a slightly reduced majority.

Huddersfield by-election, 1906
Party	Candidate	Votes	%	±%
Liberal	Arthur Sherwell	5,762	36.0	−2.2
Labour	T. Russell Williams	5,422	33.8	−1.4
Conservative	John Foster Fraser	4,844	30.2	+3.6
Majority		340	2.2	−0.8
Turnout		16,028	91.2	−2.8
Liberal hold		Swing	-0.4	

== Aftermath ==
The Labour Party decided that after two contests, Williams was not a good candidate and so it changed him for another for the next election, only to see their share of the vote drop further. The Huddersfield Liberals stifled the growth of the Labour Party up to the First World War.

General election January 1910: Huddersfield
Party	Candidate	Votes	%	±%
Liberal	Arthur Sherwell	7,158	39.8	+3.8
Labour	Harry Snell	5,686	31.6	−2.2
Conservative	Harold Smith	5,153	28.6	−1.6
Majority		1,472	8.2	+5.2
Turnout		17,997	94.6	+0.6
Registered electors		19,021		
Liberal hold		Swing	+2.6	
