= Percy Houghton =

Percy Houghton was Archdeacon of Waitemata from 1940 until his death in 1954.

Houghton was educated at Hatfield College, Durham and ordained in 1904. After curacies in Barnsley, Woodhouse and Almondbury he held incumbencies at Brooklyn and Auckland. He was Vicar general of the Anglican Diocese of Auckland from 1944 to 1949.
