= Huddersfield (constituency) =

UK Parliament constituency (since 1983)

Coordinates: 53.65°N 1.77°W

- Borough constituency for the House of Commons
- Interactive map of boundaries since 2024
- Boundary of Huddersfield in Yorkshire and the Humber
- County: West Yorkshire
- Electorate: 65,917 (December 2019)
- Major settlements: Huddersfield, Almondbury, Lepton

Current constituency
- Created: 1983
- Member of Parliament: Harpreet Uppal (Labour)
- Seats: One
- Created from: Huddersfield East; Huddersfield West

1832–1950
- Seats: One
- Type of constituency: Borough constituency
- Created from: Yorkshire
- Replaced by: Huddersfield East; Huddersfield West

Huddersfield is a constituency (Note: A borough constituency (for the purposes of election expenses and type of returning officer)) in West Yorkshire represented in the House of Commons of the UK Parliament since 2024 by Harpreet Uppal of the Labour Party. (Note: As with all constituencies, the constituency elects one Member of Parliament (MP) by the first past the post system of election at least every five years.)

== Constituency profile ==
This constituency covers the urban centre and east of the West Yorkshire town of Huddersfield, the administrative centre of the Metropolitan Borough of Kirklees. The town grew out of the former woollen industry, and is now a primarily residential market town with some light industry remaining in the town such as Syngenta and Cummins, and a growing number of students at the University of Huddersfield. The town is economically diverse with some deprived inner-city council estates, such as Deighton, and better-off areas on the outskirts, such as Fixby, which contains exclusive detached stone houses in leafy roads.

However, the town's western suburbs such as Golcar and the middle-class suburb of Lindley are actually in the neighbouring Colne Valley constituency.

Apart from four years tenure as MP by Geoffrey Dickens for Huddersfield West (1979–1983), the area (including its divided halves for the 33 years to 1983) has returned a Labour Party MP since 1945.

The constituency is currently held by the Labour Party, although the Liberal Democrats made inroads by coming second in the 2005 general election, and in the 2010 general election Karen Tween of the Conservative Party narrowed the incumbent's lead to a relatively average 4,472 votes and the new Liberal Democrat candidate slipped into third place. There are currently Green Party councillors in Newsome, and some Tory and Liberal Democrat councillors in Almondbury, but the remaining wards are safely Labour. The Dalton ward also includes the village of Kirkheaton, separated by a green buffer, and the Almondbury ward includes the small village of Lepton, West Yorkshire.

== Boundaries ==
Map of boundaries 2010–2024

1983–2010: The Borough of Kirklees wards of Almondbury, Birkby, Dalton, Deighton, Newsome, and Paddock.

2010–2024: The Borough of Kirklees wards of Almondbury, Ashbrow, Dalton, Greenhead, and Newsome.

2024–present: The Borough of Kirklees wards of Almondbury, Ashbrow, Crosland Moor and Netherton, Dalton (majority), Greenhead, and Newsome.

Under the 2023 periodic review of Westminster constituencies, the Crosland Moor and Netherton ward was transferred from Colne Valley in order to bring the electorate within the permitted range. To partly compensate, a small part of the Dalton ward, including the village of Kirkheaton was transferred to the re-established constituency of Spen Valley.

== Members of Parliament ==
Election	Member	Party
1832	Lewis Fenton	Whig
1834 by-election	John Blackburne	Whig
1837 by-election	Edward Ellice	Whig
1837	William Crompton-Stansfield	Whig
1853 by-election	Viscount Goderich	Whig
1857	Edward Akroyd	Whig
1859	Edward Leatham	Liberal
1865	Thomas Crosland	Liberal
1868	Edward Leatham	Liberal
1886	William Summers	Liberal
1893 by-election	Sir Joseph Crosland	Conservative
1895	Sir James Woodhouse	Liberal
1906 by-election	Arthur Sherwell	Liberal
1918	Sir Charles Sykes	Coalition Liberal
Jan 1922	Sir Charles Sykes	National Liberal
Nov 1922	Sir Arthur Marshall	Liberal
1923	James Hudson	Labour
1931	William Mabane	National Liberal (Note: Mabane's exact party label was confused for much of his time in the Commons before becoming Lord Mabane (first Baron). His local Liberal association was affiliated to the official Liberals until 1939, but Mabane was frequently listed as being a National Liberal, which he repeatedly sought to deny, despite supporting the National Government when the official Liberals ceased to. However the authoritative F.W.S. Craig volume and the contemporary Times Guide to the House of Commons have him as a National Liberal)
1945	Joseph Mallalieu	Labour
1950	constituency abolished: see Huddersfield East and Huddersfield West	
1983	constituency reconstituted	
1983	Barry Sheerman	Labour Co-operative
2024	Harpreet Uppal	Labour

== Elections ==
=== Elections in the 2020s ===
General election 2024: Huddersfield
Party	Candidate	Votes	%	±%
Labour	Harpreet Uppal	15,101	37.6	−13.8
Green	Andrew Cooper	10,568	26.3	+22.5
Conservative	Tony McGrath	6,559	16.3	−20.1
Reform	Susan Laird	6,196	15.4	+12.0
Liberal Democrats	Jan Dobrucki	1,741	4.3	−0.7
Majority		4,533	11.3	−3.8
Turnout		40,165	51.6	−13.3
Registered electors		77,795		
Labour hold		Swing	−18.2	

=== Elections in the 2010s ===
2019 notional result
Party	Vote	%
Labour	25,386	51.4
Conservative	17,945	36.4
Liberal Democrats	2,449	5.0
Green	1,884	3.8
Brexit Party	1,696	3.4
Turnout	49,360	64.9
Electorate	76,044	

General election 2019: Huddersfield
Party	Candidate	Votes	%	±%
Labour Co-op	Barry Sheerman	20,509	49.0	−11.4
Conservative	Ken Davy	15,572	37.2	+4.2
Liberal Democrats	James Wilkinson	2,367	5.7	+3.1
Green	Andrew Cooper	1,768	4.2	+1.0
Brexit Party	Stuart Hale	1,666	4.0	N/A
Majority		4,937	11.8	−15.6
Turnout		41,882	63.9	−1.6
Labour Co-op hold		Swing	−7.8	

General election 2017: Huddersfield
Party	Candidate	Votes	%	±%
Labour Co-op	Barry Sheerman	26,470	60.4	+15.5
Conservative	Scott Benton	14,465	33.0	+6.2
Green	Andrew Cooper	1,395	3.2	−3.7
Liberal Democrats	Zulfiqar Ali	1,155	2.6	−3.2
Yorkshire	Bikatshi Katenga	274	0.6	N/A
Independent	Marteen Thokkudubiyyapu	75	0.2	N/A
Majority		12,005	27.4	+9.3
Turnout		43,834	65.5	+3.5
Labour Co-op hold		Swing	+4.7	

General election 2015: Huddersfield
Party	Candidate	Votes	%	±%
Labour Co-op	Barry Sheerman	18,186	44.9	+6.1
Conservative	Itrat Ali	10,841	26.8	−1.0
UKIP	Rob Butler	5,948	14.7	N/A
Green	Andrew Cooper	2,798	6.9	+2.9
Liberal Democrats	Zulfiqar Ali	2,365	5.8	−18.9
TUSC	Mike Forster	340	0.8	0.0
Majority		7,345	18.1	+7.1
Turnout		40,478	62.0	+0.9
Labour Co-op hold		Swing		

General election 2010: Huddersfield
Party	Candidate	Votes	%	±%
Labour Co-op	Barry Sheerman	15,725	38.8	−7.6
Conservative	Karen Tweed	11,253	27.8	+6.7
Liberal Democrats	James Blanchard	10,023	24.7	+0.6
Green	Andrew Cooper	1,641	4.0	−0.6
BNP	Rachel Firth	1,563	3.9	+0.9
TUSC	Paul Cooney	319	0.8	N/A
Majority		4,472	11.0	
Turnout		40,524	61.1	+4.5
Labour Co-op hold		Swing	−7.1	

=== Elections in the 2000s ===
General election 2005: Huddersfield
Party	Candidate	Votes	%	±%
Labour Co-op	Barry Sheerman	16,341	46.8	−6.4
Liberal Democrats	Emma Bone	7,990	22.9	+7.9
Conservative	David Meacock	7,597	21.7	−3.2
Green	Julie Stewart-Turner	1,651	4.7	+1.2
BNP	Karl Hanson	1,036	3.0	N/A
Independent	Theresa Quarmby	325	0.9	N/A
Majority		8,351	23.9	−4.4
Turnout		34,940	56.6	+1.6
Labour Co-op hold		Swing	−7.1	

General election 2001: Huddersfield
Party	Candidate	Votes	%	±%
Labour Co-op	Barry Sheerman	18,840	53.2	−3.3
Conservative	Paul Baverstock	8,794	24.9	+4.0
Liberal Democrats	Neil Bentley	5,300	15.0	−2.2
Green	John Phillips	1,254	3.5	+1.3
UKIP	Judith Longman	613	1.7	N/A
Socialist Alliance	Graham Hellawell	374	1.1	N/A
Socialist Labour	George Randall	208	0.6	N/A
Majority		10,046	28.3	−7.3
Turnout		35,383	55.0	−12.0
Labour Co-op hold		Swing		

=== Elections in the 1990s ===
General election 1997: Huddersfield
Party	Candidate	Votes	%	±%
Labour Co-op	Barry Sheerman	25,171	56.5	
Conservative	Bill Forrow	9,323	20.9	
Liberal Democrats	Gordon Beever	7,642	17.2	
Referendum	Paul McNulty	1,480	3.3	N/A
Green	John Phillips	938	2.1	N/A
Majority		15,848	35.6	
Turnout		44,554	67.0	
Labour Co-op hold		Swing		

General election 1992: Huddersfield
Party	Candidate	Votes	%	±%
Labour Co-op	Barry Sheerman	23,832	48.7	+2.8
Conservative	JM Kenyon	16,574	33.9	+2.5
Liberal Democrats	AE Denham	7,777	15.9	−5.6
Green	Nicholas Harvey	576	1.2	−0.1
Natural Law	M Cran	135	0.3	N/A
Majority		7,258	14.8	+0.3
Turnout		48,894	72.4	−3.1
Labour Co-op hold		Swing	+0.2	

=== Elections in the 1980s ===
General election 1987: Huddersfield
Party	Candidate	Votes	%	±%
Labour Co-op	Barry Sheerman	23,019	45.9	+4.5
Conservative	Nick Hawkins	15,741	31.4	−1.8
Liberal	John Smithson	10,773	21.5	−3.3
Green	Nicholas Harvey	638	1.3	N/A
Majority		7,278	14.5	+6.3
Turnout		50,171	75.5	+4.4
Labour Co-op hold		Swing	+3.1	

General election 1983: Huddersfield
Party	Candidate	Votes	%	±%
Labour Co-op	Barry Sheerman	20,051	41.4	
Conservative	John Tweddle	16,096	33.2	
Liberal	Kathleen Hasler	12,027	24.8	
Independent	H Hirst	271	0.6	
Majority		3,955	8.2	
Turnout		48,445	71.1	
Labour Co-op win (new seat)				

=== Elections in the 1940s ===
General election 1945: Huddersfield
Party	Candidate	Votes	%	±%
Labour	Joseph Mallalieu	33,362	48.3	+9.1
National Liberal	William Mabane	24,496	35.5	−25.3
Liberal	Roy Harrod	11,119	16.2	N/A
Majority		8,866	12.8	N/A
Turnout		68,977	78.4	+5.2
Labour gain from National Liberal		Swing	+17.2	

General Election 1939–40:

Another general election was required to take place before the end of 1940. The political parties had been making preparations for an election to take place from 1939 and by the end of this year, the following candidates had been selected;

- Liberal National: William Mabane
- Labour: Joseph Mallalieu
- Liberal: Elliott Dodds

=== Elections in the 1930s ===
General election 1935: Huddersfield
Party	Candidate	Votes	%	±%
National Liberal	William Mabane	37,009	60.8	−9.3
Labour	William Pickles	23,844	39.2	+9.3
Majority		13,165	21.6	−18.6
Turnout		60,853	73.2	−10.1
National Liberal hold		Swing	−9.3	

General election 1931: Huddersfield
Party	Candidate	Votes	%	±%
National Liberal	William Mabane	47,056	70.1	+38.5
Labour	James Hudson	20,034	29.9	−8.4
Majority		27,022	40.2	N/A
Turnout		67,090	83.3	−2.8
National Liberal gain from Labour		Swing	+23.5	

=== Elections in the 1920s ===
General election 1929: Huddersfield
Party	Candidate	Votes	%	±%
Labour	James Hudson	25,966	38.3	+2.0
Liberal	William Mabane	21,398	31.6	−0.1
Unionist	Enoch Hill	20,361	30.1	−1.9
Majority		4,568	6.7	+2.4
Turnout		67,725	86.1	−2.4
Registered electors		78,635		
Labour hold		Swing	+1.0	

General election 1924: Huddersfield
Party	Candidate	Votes	%	±%
Labour	James Hudson	19,010	36.3	−0.4
Unionist	Enoch Hill	16,745	32.0	+5.3
Liberal	Arthur Marshall	16,626	31.7	−4.9
Majority		2,265	4.3	+4.2
Turnout		52,381	88.5	+6.6
Registered electors		59,176		
Labour hold		Swing	−2.8	

General election 1923: Huddersfield
Party	Candidate	Votes	%	±%
Labour	James Hudson	17,430	36.7	+3.2
Liberal	Arthur Marshall	17,404	36.6	+2.6
Unionist	Charles Tinker	12,694	26.7	N/A
Majority		26	0.1	N/A
Turnout		47,528	81.9	−1.2
Registered electors		58,029		
Labour gain from Liberal		Swing	+0.3	

Arthur Marshall

General election 1922: Huddersfield
Party	Candidate	Votes	%	±%
Liberal	Arthur Marshall	15,879	34.0	+5.3
Labour	James Hudson	15,673	33.5	+1.0
National Liberal	Charles Sykes	15,212	32.5	−6.3
Majority		206	0.5	N/A
Turnout		46,764	83.1	+13.3
Registered electors		56,243		
Liberal gain from National Liberal		Swing	+5.8	

=== Elections in the 1910s ===
Sykes

General election 1918: Huddersfield
Party		Candidate	Votes	%	±%
C	National Liberal	Charles Sykes	15,234	38.8	N/A
	Labour	Harry Snell	12,737	32.5	+3.5
	Liberal	Ernest Woodhead	11,256	28.7	−8.8
Majority			2,497	6.3	N/A
Turnout			39,227	69.8	−20.7
Registered electors			56,200		
	National Liberal gain from Liberal		Swing		
C indicates candidate endorsed by the coalition government.

General Election 1914–15:

Another General Election was required to take place before the end of 1915. The political parties had been making preparations for an election to take place and by July 1914, the following candidates had been selected;

- Liberal: Arthur Sherwell
- Unionist:
- Socialist: Harry Snell (candidature not approved by Labour Party National Executive)

General election December 1910: Huddersfield
Party	Candidate	Votes	%	±%
Liberal	Arthur Sherwell	6,458	37.5	−2.3
Conservative	Joseph Henry Kaye	5,777	33.5	+4.9
Labour	Harry Snell	4,988	29.0	−2.6
Majority		681	4.0	−4.2
Turnout		17,223	90.5	−4.1
Registered electors		19,021		
Liberal hold		Swing	−3.6	

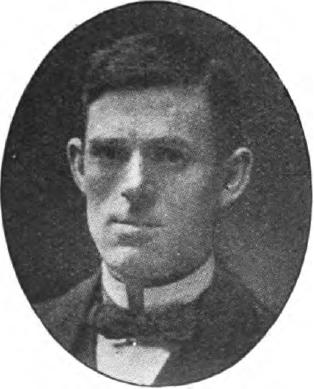
Harry Snell

General election January 1910: Huddersfield
Party	Candidate	Votes	%	±%
Liberal	Arthur Sherwell	7,158	39.8	+1.6
Labour	Harry Snell	5,686	31.6	−3.6
Conservative	Harold Smith	5,153	28.6	+2.0
Majority		1,472	8.2	+5.2
Turnout		17,997	94.6	+0.6
Registered electors		19,021		
Liberal hold		Swing	+2.6	

=== Elections in the 1900s ===
1906 Huddersfield by-election
Party	Candidate	Votes	%	±%
Liberal	Arthur Sherwell	5,762	36.0	−2.2
Labour	T. Russell Williams	5,422	33.8	−1.4
Conservative	John Foster Fraser	4,844	30.2	+3.6
Majority		340	2.2	−0.8
Turnout		16,028	91.2	−2.8
Registered electors		17,568		
Liberal hold		Swing	+0.4	

General election 1906: Huddersfield
Party	Candidate	Votes	%	±%
Liberal	James Woodhouse	6,302	38.2	−15.4
Labour Repr. Cmte.	T. Russell Williams	5,813	35.2	N/A
Conservative	John Foster Fraser	4,391	26.6	−19.8
Majority		489	3.0	−4.2
Turnout		16,506	94.0	+6.2
Registered electors		17,568		
Liberal hold		Swing	+2.2	

General election 1900: Huddersfield
Party	Candidate	Votes	%	±%
Liberal	James Woodhouse	7,896	53.6	+6.1
Conservative	Hildred Carlile	6,831	46.4	+5.1
Majority		1,065	7.2	+1.0
Turnout		14,727	87.8	−2.0
Registered electors		16,770		
Liberal hold		Swing	+0.5	

=== Elections in the 1890s ===
Woodhouse

General election 1895: Huddersfield
Party	Candidate	Votes	%	±%
Liberal	James Woodhouse	6,755	47.5	−3.4
Conservative	Joseph Crosland	5,868	41.3	−7.8
Ind. Labour Party	Russell Smart	1,594	11.2	N/A
Majority		887	6.2	+4.4
Turnout		14,217	89.8	−0.3
Registered electors		15,832		
Liberal hold		Swing	+2.2	

1893 Huddersfield by-election
Party	Candidate	Votes	%	±%
Conservative	Joseph Crosland	7,068	50.1	+1.0
Liberal	Joseph Woodhead	7,033	49.9	−1.0
Majority		35	0.2	N/A
Turnout		14,101	90.7	+0.6
Registered electors		15,550		
Conservative gain from Liberal		Swing	+1.0	

- Caused by Summers' death.

General election 1892: Huddersfield
Party	Candidate	Votes	%	±%
Liberal	William Summers	7,098	50.9	+0.1
Conservative	Joseph Crosland	6,837	49.1	−0.1
Majority		261	1.8	+0.2
Turnout		13,935	90.1	+8.5
Registered electors		15,466		
Liberal hold		Swing	+0.1	

=== Elections in the 1880s ===
General election 1886: Huddersfield
Party	Candidate	Votes	%	±%
Liberal	William Summers	6,210	50.8	−2.1
Conservative	Joseph Crosland	6,026	49.2	+2.1
Majority		184	1.6	−4.2
Turnout		12,236	81.6	−6.1
Registered electors		14,991		
Liberal hold		Swing	−2.1	

General election 1885: Huddersfield
Party	Candidate	Votes	%	±%
Liberal	Edward Leatham	6,960	52.9	−8.1
Conservative	Joseph Crosland	6,194	47.1	+8.1
Majority		766	5.8	−16.2
Turnout		13,154	87.7	+1.8
Registered electors		14,991		
Liberal hold		Swing	−8.1	

General election 1880: Huddersfield
Party	Candidate	Votes	%	±%
Liberal	Edward Leatham	7,008	61.0	+7.8
Conservative	William Alexander Lindsay	4,486	39.0	−7.8
Majority		2,522	22.0	+15.6
Turnout		11,494	85.9	−3.5
Registered electors		13,386		
Liberal hold		Swing	+7.8	

=== Elections in the 1870s ===
General election 1874: Huddersfield
Party	Candidate	Votes	%	±%
Liberal	Edward Leatham	5,668	53.2	N/A
Conservative	Thomas Brooke	4,985	46.8	N/A
Majority		683	6.4	N/A
Turnout		10,653	89.4	N/A
Registered electors		11,917		
Liberal hold		Swing	N/A	

=== Elections in the 1860s ===
General election 1868: Huddersfield
Party	Candidate	Votes	%	±%
Liberal	Edward Leatham	Unopposed		
Registered electors		11,242		
Liberal hold				

By-election, 20 March 1868: Huddersfield
Party	Candidate	Votes	%	±%
Liberal	Edward Leatham	1,111	58.5	+14.9
Conservative	William Campbell Sleigh	789	41.5	N/A
Majority		322	17.0	+4.2
Turnout		1,900	88.9	+4.4
Registered electors		2,138		
Liberal hold		Swing		

- Caused by Crosland's death.

General election 1865: Huddersfield
Party	Candidate	Votes	%	±%
Liberal	Thomas Crosland	1,019	56.4	+7.0
Liberal	Edward Leatham	787	43.6	−7.0
Majority		232	12.8	+11.6
Turnout		1,806	84.5	−8.2
Registered electors		2,138		
Liberal hold		Swing	+7.0	

=== Elections in the 1850s ===
General election 1859: Huddersfield
Party	Candidate	Votes	%	±%
Liberal	Edward Leatham	779	50.6	+8.8
Liberal	Edward Akroyd	760	49.4	−8.8
Majority		19	1.2	−14.2
Turnout		1,539	92.7	+1.7
Registered electors		1,660		
Liberal hold		Swing	+8.8	

General election 1857: Huddersfield
Party	Candidate	Votes	%	±%
Whig	Edward Akroyd	823	58.2	+6.8
Radical	Richard Cobden	590	41.8	−6.8
Majority		233	16.4	+13.6
Turnout		1,413	91.0	+1.9
Registered electors		1,552		
Whig hold		Swing	+6.8	

By-election, 22 April 1853: Huddersfield
Party	Candidate	Votes	%	±%
Whig	George Robinson	675	53.2	+1.8
Radical	Joseph Starkey	593	46.8	−1.8
Majority		82	6.4	+3.6
Turnout		1,268	89.6	+0.5
Registered electors		1,415		
Whig hold		Swing	+1.8	

- Caused by Stansfield's election being declared void on petition due to bribery and treating which "prevailed to a great extent".

General election 1852: Huddersfield
Party	Candidate	Votes	%	±%
Whig	William Crompton-Stansfield	625	51.4	−0.4
Radical	William Willans	590	48.6	+0.4
Majority		35	2.8	−0.8
Turnout		1,215	89.1	+0.4
Registered electors		1,364		
Whig hold		Swing	−0.4	

=== Elections in the 1840s ===
General election 1847: Huddersfield
Party	Candidate	Votes	%	±%
Whig	William Crompton-Stansfield	525	51.8	N/A
Radical	John Cheetham (Huddersfield MP)	488	48.2	N/A
Majority		37	3.6	N/A
Turnout		1,013	88.7	N/A
Registered electors		1,142		
Whig hold		Swing	N/A	

General election 1841: Huddersfield
Party	Candidate	Votes	%	±%
Whig	William Crompton-Stansfield	Unopposed		
Registered electors		1,003		
Whig hold				

=== Elections in the 1830s ===
General election 1837: Huddersfield
Party	Candidate	Votes	%	±%
Whig	William Crompton-Stansfield	323	51.8	−17.1
Conservative	Richard Oastler	301	48.2	N/A
Majority		22	3.6	−34.2
Turnout		624	78.0	+25.8
Registered electors		800		
Whig hold		Swing		

By-election, 8 May 1837: Huddersfield
Party	Candidate	Votes	%	±%
Whig	Edward Ellice	340	54.0	−14.9
Conservative	Richard Oastler	290	46.0	N/A
Majority		50	8.0	−29.8
Turnout		630	78.8	+26.6
Registered electors		800		
Whig hold		Swing		

- Caused by Blackburne's death

General election 1835: Huddersfield
Party	Candidate	Votes	%	±%
Whig	John Blackburne (Huddersfield MP)	241	68.9	+5.5
Radical	William Augustus Johnson	109	31.1	−5.5
Majority		132	37.8	+11.0
Turnout		350	52.2	−16.1
Registered electors		671		
Whig hold		Swing	+5.5	

By-election, 9 January 1834: Huddersfield
Party	Candidate	Votes	%	±%
Whig	John Blackburne (Huddersfield MP)	234	47.8	−15.6
Tory	Michael Thomas Sadler	147	30.0	N/A
Radical	Joseph Wood	108	22.0	−14.6
Whig	John Charles Ramsden	1	0.2	N/A
Majority		87	17.8	−9.0
Turnout		490	81.1	+12.8
Registered electors		640		
Whig hold		Swing	−0.5	

- Caused by Fenton's death. While Ramsden was not a candidate, a local spirit merchant, Paul Hirst, voted for him.

General election 1832: Huddersfield
Party	Candidate	Votes	%
Whig	Lewis Fenton	263	63.4
Radical	Joseph Wood	152	36.6
Majority		111	26.8
Turnout		415	68.3
Registered electors		608	
Whig win (new seat)			

== See also ==
- List of parliamentary constituencies in West Yorkshire
- List of parliamentary constituencies in the Yorkshire and the Humber (region)
