= Joseph Crosland =

British politician (1826–1904)

Sir Joseph Crosland DL (24 October 1826 – 27 August 1904) was a British Conservative politician who served as Member of Parliament for Huddersfield from 4 February 1893 to 13 July 1895. He had contested the seat in the previous three general elections, losing each time to the Liberal candidate. He was made Knight Bachelor in the 1889 Birthday Honours.

Joseph was the third son of George Crosland, a wool manufacturer who built several mills in the area around Huddersfield, notably in Lockwood and Crosland Moor.

Crosland was a Conservative councillor for Lockwood (1869–72), a member of the School Board, and President of the Chamber of Commerce (1872–74). Crosland led the family textile firm, and was chairman of the Huddersfield Banking company from 1876 until 1897, when it was amalgamated with the London, City and Midland Bank. He was an Anglican for most of his life. His brother, Thomas Crosland, represented Huddersfield as MP between 1865 and 1868. Crosland built Royds Hall in 1866 as a family home; the building is now Royds Hall School.

Parliament of the United Kingdom
Preceded by William Summers	Member of Parliament for Huddersfield; 1893 – 1895	Succeeded by James Woodhouse
