= Barry Sheerman =

British Labour Co-op politician (born 1940)

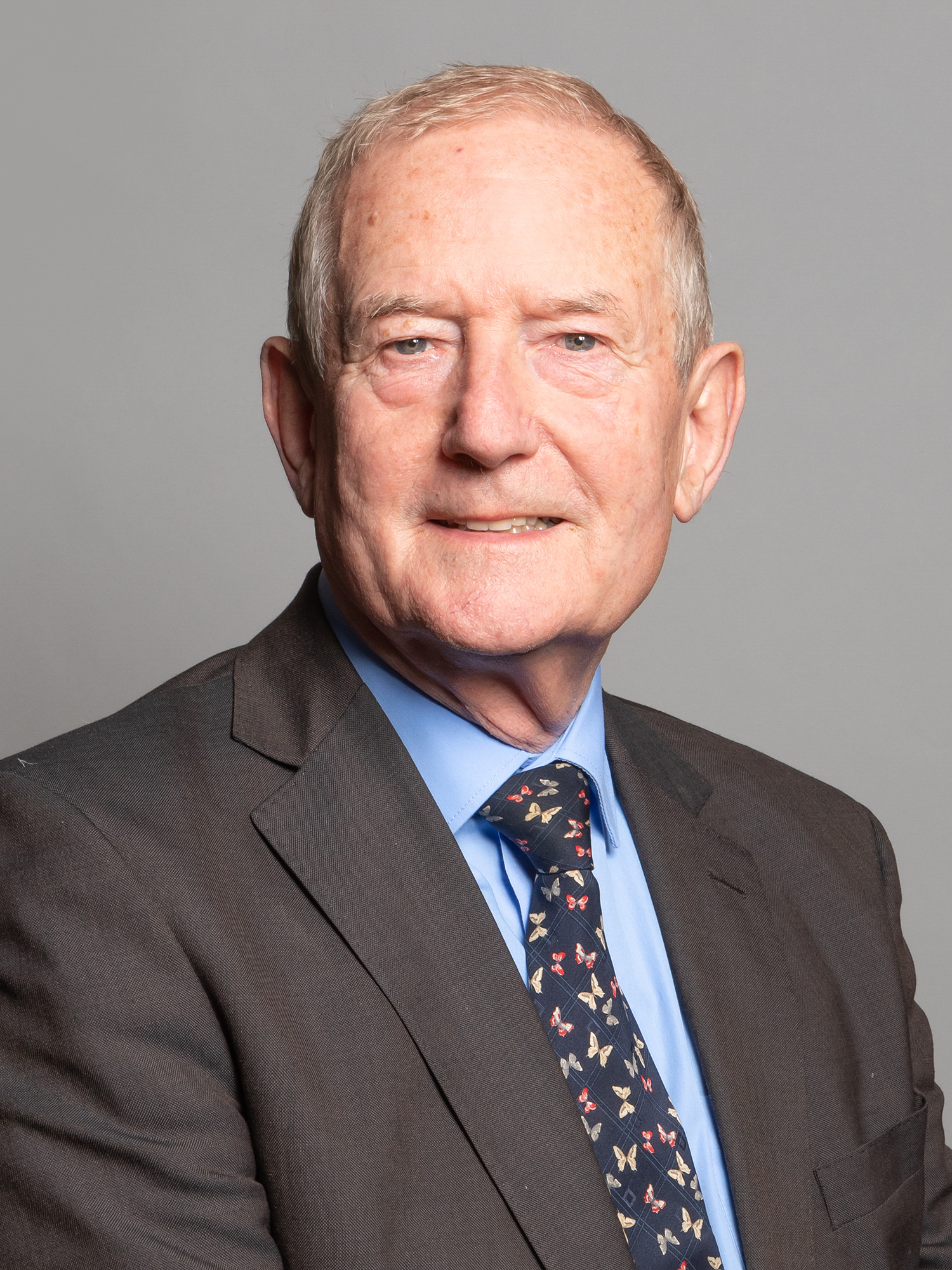
- Official portrait, 2020

Member of Parliament for Huddersfield Huddersfield East (1979–1983)
- In office 3 May 1979 – 30 May 2024
- Preceded by: Joseph Mallalieu
- Succeeded by: Harpreet Uppal

Chair of the Children, Schools and Families Committee (Note: Education and Skills from 2001 to 2007.)
- In office 16 July 2001 – 19 June 2010
- Preceded by: Malcolm Wicks
- Succeeded by: Graham Stuart

Personal details
- Born: Barry John Sheerman; 17 August 1940 (age 86) Sunbury-on-Thames, Middlesex, England
- Party: Labour Co-op
- Spouse: Pamela Brenchley (m. 1965)
- Children: 4
- Education: London School of Economics (BSc); University of London (MSc)

Barry John Sheerman (born 17 August 1940) is a British politician who served as Member of Parliament (MP) for Huddersfield, previously Huddersfield East, for 45 years from 1979 to 2024. A member of the Labour and Co-operative parties, he is one of the longest serving MPs in recent history.

== Early life ==
Sheerman was born on 17 August 1940 in Sunbury-on-Thames, Middlesex, and went to Hampton Grammar School (which became the independent Hampton School in 1975) on Hanworth Road in Hampton, then to Kingston Technical College.

He graduated from the London School of Economics (BSc Economics 1965) and from the University of London (MSc 1967). He became a lecturer at the University of Wales, Swansea, in 1966 and remained there until his election to parliament in 1979.

== Parliamentary career ==
Sheerman unsuccessfully contested Taunton at the October 1974 election. He became the MP for Huddersfield East from 1979 to 1983 and for Huddersfield since the 1983 general election, holding the seat since then, with a majority as low as 3,955 in 1983 and as high as 15,848 at the 1997 general election. At the most recent general election, in 2019, Sheerman's majority fell to 4,937 with a swing of 7.8% to the Conservatives, in line with many other seats in Yorkshire.

As the shadow Employment and Training minister from 1983 to 1988, he was the opposition spokesperson for post-16 education in both the education and employment teams. He served as a shadow Home Affairs minister from 1988 to 1992, focusing on police, prisons and probation as the deputy to Roy Hattersley, the Shadow Home Secretary. Following John Smith's election as Labour leader, Sheerman served as the shadow Disabled People's Rights minister from 1992 to 1994.

He chaired the House of Commons Education and Skills select committee from 2001 to 2007, and remained chair of the renamed Children, Schools and Families Select Committee from 2007 to 2010. Under his chairmanship, the committee was often critical of government policy. Sheerman warned the government not to "lose their nerve" over reforming secondary education exam system back in 2005, and in 2006 said it was "naive" to allocate local school places through parental choice, with lottery selection being the best way to avoid "bloody awful" schools existing as a side effect of parents pushing for their children to study elsewhere. During Sheerman's chairmanship, the select committee produced reports on subjects such as home education, education outside the classroom, and young people not in education employment or training (NEETs).

He is Chair of the Labour Forum for Criminal Justice and of the Cross-Party Advisory Group on Preparation for European Monetary Union. Outside parliament, he is Chair of the National Educational Research and Development Trust, and a trustee of the National Children's Centre. His political interests are listed as trade, industry, finance, further education, education, economy, the European Union, South America and the United States.

In June 2009, Sheerman called for a secret ballot of the Parliamentary Labour Party on whether Gordon Brown should continue in office as prime minister. This followed widespread criticism of Brown's performance and the resignation of Cabinet member James Purnell. Sheerman later reassured his local party chairman that he had not directly called for Brown's resignation.

Sheerman called for a London catering company to employ "English workers" in a Twitter exchange on 23 April 2012. The comments reached the national press. In response, Sheerman said the objection to him speaking out was "pernicious political correctness".

He is founder and chairman of Policy Connect, a cross-party, not-for-profit based in London, where he regularly chairs seminar events and research inquiries. Sheerman is also chair and co-chair of a number of official All-Party Parliamentary Groups, including the All-Party Parliamentary Carbon Monoxide Group, the All-Party Parliamentary Manufacturing Group, and the Bullying All-Party Group. Since 2012, He has led the Schools to Work Commission, the Labour Party's policy review on the transition from education to employment.

In June 2015, Sheerman caused controversy when he argued that lowering the voting age to 16, by reducing childhood, might raise the risk of sexual abuse.

On 5 December 2021, Sheerman announced his intention to stand down at the next election; at the time of the announcement he was the longest-serving Labour MP.

== Political positions ==
Sheerman consistently voted for the Iraq War, and has nearly always voted to block subsequent independent investigations into the war, with the most recent such vote in 2016. He is a member of Labour Friends of Israel.

He supported Owen Smith in the 2016 Labour Party leadership election. Sheerman supported the UK remaining within the EU in the 2016 membership referendum.

During the COVID-19 pandemic, Sheerman suggested that "on the spot fines" would increase compliance with mask mandates.

== Personal life ==
Barry Sheerman married Pamela Elizabeth Brenchley in 1965 in north Surrey, with whom he has one son (born in 1978) and three daughters (born in 1970, 1972 and 1981). During a Parliamentary Debate in November 2022 he announced the recent birth of his 13th grandchild. His recreations include walking, biography and films.

In 1993, Sheerman co-wrote, with Isaac Kramnick, a biography of the Labour intellectual Harold Laski.

== Notes ==
Parliament of the United Kingdom
Preceded by Joseph Mallalieu	Member of Parliament for Huddersfield East; 1979–1983	Constituency abolished
New constituency	Member of Parliament for Huddersfield; 1983–2024	Succeeded by Harpreet Uppal
Political offices
Unknown	Shadow Minister of State for Social Security (Shadow Minister for Disabled People); 1992–1994	Vacant Title next held by Tom Clarke
Preceded by Malcolm Wicks	Chairman, Education & Skills Select Committee; 2001–2007	Committee abolished
New title	Chairman, Children, Schools and Families Select Committee; 2007–2010	Succeeded by Graham Stuart
