= Bernard Jennings =

English adult educationist and historian (1928–2017)

Bernard Jennings (1928–2017) was an English adult educationist and historian. He was president of the Workers' Educational Association in the 1980s, and was known for his local histories of Yorkshire.

Jennings was born in Nelson, Lancashire, in 1928. He was educated at St Mary's College in Blackburn and the College of St Mark and St John in London. After national service in the Army Education Corps he joined the Workers' Educational Association as an organising tutor in Yorkshire. In 1958 he took a master's degree in adult education at Leeds University, and then became a lecturer at Leeds. In 1973 he moved to Hull University, where he stayed until his retirement in 1995, until 1993 as Professor of Adult Education and then as Professor of Regional and Local History.

He published 17 books on adult education and local history. Three of the books were written with local groups of WEA students, and provided a model for collaborative local history projects.

Jennings was active in Liberal politics. In 1954 he became a county councillor for Richmond in the North Riding of Yorkshire, and in 1964 stood for parliament for Huddersfield East.

== Selected publications ==
- A History of Nidderdale (1967, Advertiser Press, 1983 and 1992, Nidderdale History Group ISBN 1-85072-114-9)
- A History of Harrogate and Knaresborough (1970, Advertiser Press ISBN 9780900028045)
- Community Colleges in England and Wales (1980, NIAE ISBN 9780900559426)
- Pennine Independency (1982, Pennine Heritage ISBN 9780907613114)
- Pennine Valley: A History of Upper Calderdale (1994, Smith Settle ISBN 9781870071932)
- The Yorkshire Monasteries: Cloister, Land and People (1999, Smith Settle ISBN 9781858251059)
