= Arthur Sherwell =

British politician

Arthur James Sherwell (11 April 1863 – 13 January 1942) was a British Liberal Party politician and temperance campaigner.

== Background ==
He was born in London on 11 April 1863, the son of John Viney Sherwell, of Modbury, Devon. He was educated privately. He married in 1909, Amy Whadcoat of Bodiam, Sussex.

== Career ==
Prior to entering Parliament he was occupied in sociological and politico-economic studies and literary work. Most notably in connection with the Temperance movement with his friend Joseph Rowntree with whom he published a number of works; The Temperance Problem and Social Reform [1899], Life in West London [1901], British Gothenburg Experiments [1901], The Drink Peril in Scotland [1903], Public Control of the Liquor Trade [1903], The Taxation of the Liquor Trade [1908], The Russian Vodka Monopoly, State Purchase of the Liquor Trade [1919], State Prohibition and Local Option. He travelled extensively, had been several times round the world, and had an intimate acquaintance with the United States and the British Dominions and Colonies. He served as Liberal Member of Parliament for Huddersfield from 1906 to 1918. He first stood for parliament at the 1906 Huddersfield by-election, following the 1906 General election when he held a seat for the Liberals. He was re-elected in both 1910 General Elections and retired from parliament just before the 1918 General election. He served on various Government Committees and Commissions. He was a member of the Sociological Society.

== Sources ==
- Who Was Who
- British parliamentary election results 1885–1918, Craig, F. W. S.

Parliament of the United Kingdom
Preceded by James Woodhouse	Member of Parliament for Huddersfield; 1906 Huddersfield by-election–1918	Succeeded by Charles Sykes
