= William Summers =

British politician and barrister

William Summers (4 November 1853 – 1 January 1893) was a British politician and barrister. He was born in Stalybridge, the second son of John Summers, the local ironmaster, and his wife Mary.

== Education ==
William Summers was educated at the private school of a Mr. Wood, Alderley Edge, Cheshire, after which he entered Owens College in about 1869. After gaining honours in the College examinations. he studied for a BA at the university of London and became an associate of the college in 1872. In 1874 he entered University College, Oxford, and in 1877 took the BA degree with a second class. He followed this up with an MA degree at the University of London where he was awarded the Gold Medal in classics. When he left Oxford he was called to the bar at Lincoln's Inn in 1881.

== Political career ==
In 1880 he was elected as Liberal Member of Parliament for Stalybridge, unseating the sitting Conservative MP, Tom Harrop Sidebottom. Five years later Sidebottom regained the seat.

In 1886 he returned to the Commons as MP for Huddersfield, and was re-elected in 1892.

He was unwell at the time of the 1892 election campaign, and was unable to attend a number of meetings. In October 1892 he sailed for Bombay with the twin objects of improving his health and gathering information on Indian affairs. He died at Allahabad from malignant smallpox aged 39.

Parliament of the United Kingdom
Preceded by Tom Harrop Sidebottom	Member of Parliament for Stalybridge; 1880 – 1885	Succeeded by Tom Harrop Sidebottom
Preceded by Edward Aldam Leatham	Member of Parliament for Huddersfield; 1886 – 1893	Succeeded by Sir Joseph Crosland
