= William Mallalieu =

British politician

Sir William Mallalieu

Member of Parliament for Huddersfield East
- In office 23 February 1950 – 3 May 1979
- Preceded by: New constituency
- Succeeded by: Barry Sheerman

Member of Parliament for Huddersfield
- In office 5 July 1945 – 23 February 1950
- Preceded by: William Mabane
- Succeeded by: Constituency abolished

Personal details
- Born: Joseph Percival William Mallalieu; 18 June 1908 Delph, Saddleworth, West Riding of Yorkshire
- Died: 13 March 1980 (aged 71)
- Party: Labour
- Spouse: Harriet Rita Riddle Tinn (m. 1945)
- Relations: Lance Mallalieu (brother)
- Children: Ann; Ben
- Parent: Frederick Mallalieu
- Education: Trinity College, Oxford; University of Chicago
- Nickname(s): J. P. W.; Bill; Curly

Sir Joseph Percival William Mallalieu (18 June 1908 – 13 March 1980) was a British Labour Party politician, journalist and author.

== Life ==
Mallalieu was of Huguenot origin, a son of Frederick Mallalieu, a Member of Parliament. Mallalieu's ancestors had settled at Saddleworth in the early 1600s, where they lived in humble circumstances working as weavers. Frederick Mallalieu's father, Henry (1831–1902), was a self-made businessman, at the age of twelve a hand-loom weaver. He became a woollen manufacturer, chairman of ironworks companies, and magistrate.

Mallalieu was educated at the Dragon School in Oxford, Cheltenham College, Trinity College, Oxford, and the University of Chicago. He was President of the Oxford Union in 1930 and a rugby blue. He served in the Royal Navy 1942–45, joining as an ordinary seaman and later being commissioned and promoted to lieutenant. His novel, Very Ordinary Seaman, is based on his experiences in the navy.

From 1945 to 1950, Mallalieu was member of parliament for Huddersfield; and then, after boundary changes, for Huddersfield East from 1950 to 1979. He had various ministerial positions under Harold Wilson (a Huddersfield native), including Minister of Defence for the Royal Navy (1966–1967), the Board of Trade (1967–1968) and Technology (1968–1969).

Mallalieu is the author of Rats! (Left Book Club, 1941) under the pseudonym 'The Pied Piper'. A collection of his writing on various sports, mostly written for The Spectator, was published as Sporting Days (The Sportsmans Book Club, 1957).

He was given the Freedom of Kirklees in West Yorkshire on 27 January 1980.

== Family ==
In 1945, Mallalieu married Harriet Rita Riddle Tinn, daughter of Jack Tinn, manager of Portsmouth F.C. from 1927 to 1947. Their daughter, Ann, is a Labour peer. Mallalieu's brother Lance was also a Member of Parliament. His uncle, Albert Henry Mallalieu, was head of that family of Tan-y-Marian, Llandudno.

== Arms ==
Coat of arms of William Mallalieu
Notes Granted in 1920. Escutcheon Azure on a chevron Ermine between three fleurs-de-lis Argent four bezants on a chief Ermines a rose of the third barbed and seeded Proper. Motto Mal A Lui Qui Mal En Dit (Evil To Him Who Speaks Evil) Symbolism Fleurs-de-lis refer to Huguenot ancestry, motto cants on family name.

Parliament of the United Kingdom
Preceded by William Mabane	Member of Parliament for Huddersfield; 1945–1950	Constituency abolished
New constituency	Member of Parliament for Huddersfield East; 1950–1979	Succeeded by Barry Sheerman
