= Sidebotham =

Sidebotham is an English surname, a variant of Sidebottom. Notable people with this surname include:

- Joseph Watson Sidebotham (1857–1925), British colliery owner and politician
- Robin Sidebotham, British rock musician, known professionally as Robin George
- Stephen Sidebotham (born 1935), English priest, Dean of Hong Kong
