= Parliamentary Secretary to the Ministry of Food =

Ministerial post

The Parliamentary Secretary to the Ministry of Food Control, later the Parliamentary Secretary to the Ministry of Food was a junior Ministerial post in the Government of the United Kingdom from 1916 to 1921 and then from 1939 to 1954. The post supported the Minister of Food Control, later the Minister of Food.

== List of Parliamentary Secretaries ==
=== Parliamentary Secretaries to the Ministry of Food Control, 1916-1921 ===
Name	Entered office	Left office
Charles Bathurst	12 December 1916	2 July 1917
John Robert Clynes	2 July 1917	18 July 1918
Waldorf Astor	18 July 1918	27 January 1919
Charles McCurdy	27 January 1919	19 April 1920
William Mitchell-Thomson	19 April 1920	31 March 1921

=== Parliamentary Secretaries to the Ministry of Food, 1939-1954 ===
Name	Entered office	Left office
Alan Lennox-Boyd	11 October 1939	15 May 1940
Robert Boothby	15 May 1940	22 October 1940
Gwilym Lloyd George	22 October 1940	3 June 1942
William Mabane	3 June 1942	23 May 1945
Florence Horsbrugh	23 May 1945	13 July 1945
Edith Summerskill	4 August 1945	2 March 1950
Stanley Evans	2 March 1950	18 April 1950
Fred Willey	18 April 1950	26 October 1951
Charles Hill	31 October 1951	18 October 1954
