= David Woodhouse, 4th Baron Terrington =

Major The Right Honourable The Lord Terrington

Member of the House of Lords
- Lord Temporal
- In office 7 January 1961 – 6 May 1998
- Preceded by: The 3rd Baron Terrington
- Succeeded by: The 5th Baron Terrington

Personal details
- Born: James Allen David Woodhouse; 30 December 1915
- Died: 6 May 1998 (aged 82)
- Spouse(s): Suzanne Irwin (m. 1942)
- Children: Lavinia Harrisson; Georgina Leatham; Davinia Alexander, Countess Alexander of Tunis
- Education: Winchester College
- Alma mater: Royal Military Academy Sandhurst

Major James Allen David Woodhouse, 4th Baron Terrington (30 December 1915 – 6 May 1998), was a Baron in the Peerage of the United Kingdom and Deputy Chairman of Committees in the House of Lords. He was a member of the London Stock Exchange and a director of S J Carr and County (Gunmakers) Ltd. He served in the Royal Norfolk Regiment and Queen's Westminster Rifles and was wounded in World War II.

Woodhouse was the son of Horace Woodhouse, 3rd Baron Terrington, and Valerie Phillips, and was educated at Winchester College and then at Royal Military College, Sandhurst. He married Suzanne Irwin, daughter of Colonel Thomas Strutt Irwin, on 7 November 1942. They had three daughters.

On his death in 1998, having no male heirs, was succeeded by his brother, Montague Woodhouse, who became the 5th Baron. David is depicted in three glass-plate negative photographs held by the National Portrait Gallery, two of which show him as a child.

== Arms ==
Coat of arms of David Woodhouse, 4th Baron Terrington
Crest Issuant out of a wreath of roses Argent barbed and seeded Proper a demi-woodman also Proper supporting in the dexter hand an axe Or. Escutcheon Per fess Or and Azure a hurst of oak trees issuant in chief Proper and two bars wavy in base Argent. Supporters On either side an Airedale terrier Proper gorged with a ducal coronet Or. Motto Labor Omnia Vincit

Peerage of the United Kingdom
Preceded by Horace Woodhouse	Baron Terrington; 1961–1998; Member of the House of Lords (1961–1998)	Succeeded by Montague Woodhouse
