= James Woodhouse, 1st Baron Terrington =

English Liberal politician

Sir James Woodhouse

James Thomas Woodhouse, 1st Baron Terrington (16 July 1852 – 8 February 1921), known as Sir James Woodhouse, from 1895 to 1918, was an English Liberal Party politician.

Woodhouse was the son of James Woodhouse of Flamborough, Yorkshire. He served as the member of parliament (MP) for Huddersfield from 1895 to 1906, and was also a Railway and Canal Traffic Commissioner from 1906 to 1921 and Chairman of the Losses under Defence of the Realm Commission from 1915 to 1921. He was knighted in 1895, and on 19 January 1918 he was raised to the peerage as Baron Terrington, of Huddersfield in the County of York.

Lord Terrington married Jessie, daughter of Walter James Reed, in 1876. They had two children: Harold and Horace. Lord Terrington died in February 1921, aged 68, and was succeeded in his titles by his eldest son Harold. Lady Terrington died in 1942.

== Arms ==
Coat of arms of James Woodhouse, 1st Baron Terrington
Crest Issuant out of a wreath of roses Argent barbed and seeded Proper a demi-woodman also Proper supporting in the dexter hand an axe Or. Escutcheon Per fess Or and Azure a hurst of oak trees issuant in chief Proper and two bars wavy in base Argent. Supporters On either side an Airedale terrier Proper gorged with a ducal coronet Or. Motto Labor Omnia Vincit

Parliament of the United Kingdom
Preceded by Sir Joseph Crosland	Member of Parliament for Huddersfield; 1895–1906	Succeeded by Arthur James Sherwell
Peerage of the United Kingdom
New creation	Baron Terrington; 1918–1921	Succeeded by Harold Woodhouse
