= Sir Charles Sykes, 1st Baronet =

British politician (1867–1950)

Sir Charles Sykes Bt KBE JP

Member of Parliament for Huddersfield
- In office 1918–1922

Personal details
- Born: 31 December 1867
- Died: 16 November 1950 (aged 82)
- Occupation: Wool merchant

Sir Charles Sykes, 1st Baronet, KBE, JP (31 December 1867 – 16 November 1950) was an English politician and wool merchant.

Sykes was born on 31 December 1867, and entered the wool trade at a young age. During the First World War he served as Director of Wool Textile Production and as chairman of the Board of Control of the Worsted and Woollen Trades. In the Second World War he served as an adviser to the War Office on textile and clothing production.

In 1918 he was elected to Parliament as Coalition Liberal member for Huddersfield, but lost the seat in 1922.

He was appointed Knight Commander of the Order of the British Empire (KBE) in 1918 and created a Baronet in the 1921 Birthday Honours, both for his war services.

== Footnotes ==
Parliament of the United Kingdom
Preceded by Arthur James Sherwell	Member of Parliament for Huddersfield; 1918 – 1922	Succeeded by Sir Arthur Harold Marshall
Baronetage of the United Kingdom
New creation	Baronet (of Kingsknowes); 1921–1950	Succeeded by Hugh Sykes
