= Thomas Crosland =

British politician (1815–1868)

Thomas Crosland MP

Member of Parliament for Huddersfield
- In office 14 July 1865 – 8 March 1868
- Preceded by: Edward Leatham
- Succeeded by: Edward Leatham

Personal details
- Born: 29 December 1815 Crosland Lodge, Lockwood, Huddersfield, Yorkshire, England
- Died: 8 March 1868 (aged 52) Gledholt, Huddersfield, Yorkshire, England
- Party: Liberal
- Parent(s): George Crosland; Mary Anne Pearson

Thomas Pearson Crosland (29 December 1815 – 8 March 1868) was a British Liberal Party politician and woollen manufacturer.

== Family and early life ==
Crosland was the son of George Crosland and Mary Anne Pearson, the latter of whom died just four months after his birth. In early life, he worked, alongside his brothers, working for the family business George Crosland & Sons.

Crosland married three times, first to Ann Kilner, daughter of William Kilner in 1841. After she died in 1845, he remarried to Matilda Roche Cousins in 1849 who bore him a son, George William Crosland (c1852–1902); and then, after her death in 1853, Julia Cousins, with whom he had another eight children:

- Ada Pearson Crosland (1855–1919)
- Thomas Pearson Crosland (1856–1932)
- Julia Pearson Crosland (1857– )
- John Pearson Crosland (1860–1946)
- Stanley Pearson Crosland (1861–1929)
- Arthur Pearson Crosland (1862– )
- Marion Pearson Crosland (1865–1938)
- Alfred Pearson Crosland (1866–1867)

== Political career ==
He was elected MP, as a staunch Whig Liberal and supporter of free trade, for Huddersfield in 1865 but did not serve a full term before his death in 1868.

Crosland's brother, Joseph Crosland, became the seat's first Conservative MP in 1893.

== Activities ==
Crosland was a member of the Mechanics' Institute, and a patron of the Yorkshire Penny Bank. He was also a proprietor of Huddersfield College, and patron of the Naturalist Society. He also held the role of master freemason.

== Other appointments ==
Crosland was appointed an Improvement Commissioner from 1848 to 1852, and later a waterworks commissioner. In 1852, he was named a Justice of the Peace and, in 1864, a Deputy Lieutenant of the West Riding of Yorkshire.

He was made a Captain of the 2nd Company in 1860, a Major in 1862, a Lieutenant-Colonel in 1864, and an honorary colonel of the 5th Battalion of West York Rifle Volunteers in 1866.

In 1863, he was appointed president of the Huddersfield Chamber of Commerce.

Parliament of the United Kingdom
Preceded by Edward Leatham	Member of Parliament for Huddersfield; 1865–1868	Succeeded by Edward Leatham
