= T. Russell Williams =

British socialist politician

William in about 1906

Thomas Russell Williams (1869 – 1926) was a British socialist politician.

Williams grew up in Huddersfield and largely educated himself. He entered the textile industry and rose to become manager of a mill. He tried to enter the civil service, but was rejected, and instead turned his attention to the trade union movement. He became interested in ethical socialism and joined the Independent Labour Party (ILP), serving on its national council, though never becoming a figure well-known to the public.

Williams stood as the Labour Representation Committee candidate for Huddersfield at the 1906 general election. He was initially selected by the local trades council, and only later gained the backing of the ILP, against the private wishes of Ramsay MacDonald. He believed that he had a strong chance of winning the seat, but ultimately took a close second place, with 35.2% of the vote, on an extremely high turnout of 94% of eligible voters.

Williams stood again at the 1906 Huddersfield by-election, for the renamed Labour Party, but again lost narrowly, his vote dropping slightly to 33.8%. Although blaming this on the disqualification of some working class voters, he also admitted that the party had failed to make new converts.

Williams lost further favour with the ILP leadership after he endorsed Victor Grayson in his successful independent labour campaign at the 1907 Colne Valley by-election. However, he was selected for Spen Valley, taking 23.3% of the vote at the January 1910 general election. In anticipation of an election in 1914 or 1915, he was made Labour's Prospective Parliamentary Candidate for Darlington, but was not happy as he felt there was little chance of winning the seat, and by the time the 1918 general election came around, there was no Labour candidate in the town.

Williams died in 1926.

Party political offices
Preceded by New position	Yorkshire Division representative on the Independent Labour Party National Administrative Council; 1906–1908	Succeeded by Ben Riley
