= Evan Luard =

British politician

Member of Parliament for Oxford
- In office 10 October 1974 – 7 April 1979
- Preceded by: Montague Woodhouse
- Succeeded by: John Patten
- In office 31 March 1966 – 29 May 1970
- Preceded by: Montague Woodhouse
- Succeeded by: Montague Woodhouse

Personal details
- Born: 31 October 1926 Addington, Kent, England
- Died: 8 February 1991 (aged 64) Richmond upon Thames, Surrey
- Party: Labour (until 1981); SDP (1981–1988)
- Education: King's College, Cambridge

David Evan Trant Luard (31 October 1926 – 8 February 1991), most commonly known as Evan Luard, was a British Labour Party and Social Democratic Party (SDP) politician, and a renowned international relations scholar.

== Education and early career ==
Luard was educated at King's College School, Cambridge, Felsted School and King's College, Cambridge, where he gained a First in Part I of the Modern Languages tripos. In 1950, he joined the Foreign Service, and after learning Chinese he was stationed in Peking from 1952 to 1954. In 1956 he resigned from the diplomatic service in protest of Britain's involvement in the Suez Crisis.

He became a research fellow at St Antony's College, Oxford, in 1957, where he was able to research Chinese relations with Britain. He was a Labour councillor on Oxford City Council from 1958 to 1961.

== Political career ==
Having first contested the seat in 1964, Luard was elected as the Labour Party Member of Parliament (MP) for Oxford in 1966. He served as MP until 1970 and again from October 1974 to 1979. He was the only Labour member ever to represent the constituency in its original form. He served as a Parliamentary Under Secretary of State in the Foreign Office from 1969 to 1970 and again from 1976 until Labour left power in 1979.

Luard joined the SDP soon after its formation, and contested the 1983 general election for the party in the newly formed constituency of Oxford West and Abingdon. He was de-selected as candidate in 1987 in favour of Chris Huhne.

== Publications ==
Luard is mainly known for his extensive writings on numerous aspects of international relations. He is also known for his sociological theories including the hierarchy theory. His exhaustive study of war, War in International Society: A Study in International Sociology, was published in Britain in 1986 and by Yale University Press in the United States in 1987. Luard also contributed a number of studies in support of "community socialism" in Britain, most notably Socialism without the State (1979). An account of his life and work appeared in the Oxford Dictionary of National Biography in 2004.

Parliament of the United Kingdom
Preceded by Montague Woodhouse	Member of Parliament for Oxford; 1966–1970	Succeeded by Montague Woodhouse
Preceded by Montague Woodhouse	Member of Parliament for Oxford; 1974–1979	Succeeded by John Patten
