= William Campbell Sleigh =

William Campbell Sleigh (21 October 1818 – 23 January 1887) was an English lawyer and politician. He became a serjeant-at-law in 1868, the last person received into Serjeants' Inn who was not a judge.

== Early life ==
Sleigh was born in Dublin, the eldest son of William Willcocks Sleigh, M.D., of Bull House, Buckinghamshire, and subsequently of Dublin. After a private education, he matriculated from St. Mary Hall, Oxford on 9 February 1843, but did not graduate with a degree.

He married Amelia Warner at Waterperry in Oxfordshire on 25 January 1843. They had one child, William Warner Sleigh, who also became a barrister.

== Legal career ==
Sleigh became a student of the Middle Temple on 18 January 1843, and was called to the bar on 30 January 1846. He practised on the home circuit, attending the Central Criminal Court, and the London, Middlesex, and Kent quarter sessions. He was created a serjeant-at-law on 2 November 1868: he was the last person received into Serjeants' Inn who was not a judge. Like his fellow serjeants-at-law, John Humffreys Parry, William Ballantine, and John Walter Huddleston (afterwards Baron Huddleston), he enjoyed a lucrative practice at the Old Bailey, and took part in many leading criminal trials, being a most effective cross-examiner

In 1871 he accepted the first brief for the claimant Arthur Orton, alias Roger Tichborne, in his civil action. He was long retained as leading counsel to the Bank of England, with Hardinge Giffard (afterwards Lord Halsbury) as his junior.

He stood for Parliament four times without being elected: as a Liberal in Lambeth on 5 May 1862, and as a Conservative in Huddersfield on 20 March 1868, Frome in the 1868 general election on 17 November 1868, and Newark on 1 April 1870.

After visiting Australia in 1871, convalescing from sciatica, he decided to emigrate in 1877. He was called to the bar in New South Wales on 8 March 1877 and in Victoria on 21 March 1877. Although a claim to precedence as a serjeant-at-law was not allowed, he was given the courtesy title of serjeant. He was the only serjeant-at-law to practise in Australia. He moved to Launceston and was admitted to the bar in Tasmania on 11 March 1880. He was elected to the Tasmanian House of Assembly in April 1880, as an independent candidate for the Deloraine seat. He spent more time in Melbourne after visiting England in 1881.

== Later life ==
His son died in 1882, and he returned to England permanently in 1886. He died at Ventnor on the Isle of Wight, survived by his wife.

== Publications ==
Among his publications were:

- Marriage with a Deceased Wife's Sister, 1850.
- The Grand Jury System subversive of the Moral Interests of Society, 1852.
- A Handy Book on Criminal Law, applicable chiefly to Commercial Transactions, 1858.
- Personal Wrongs and Legal Remedies, 1860.
