= Montague Woodhouse, 5th Baron Terrington =

British Conservative politician

The Right Honourable The Lord Terrington DSO OBE

Member of the House of Lords
- Lord Temporal
- In office 6 May 1998 – 11 November 1999 as a hereditary peer
- Preceded by: The 4th Baron Terrington
- Succeeded by: Seat abolished (Note: Pursuant to the House of Lords Act 1999.)

Member of Parliament for Oxford
- In office 8 October 1959 – 10 March 1966
- Preceded by: Lawrence Turner
- Succeeded by: Evan Luard
- In office 18 June 1970 – 20 September 1974
- Preceded by: Evan Luard
- Succeeded by: Evan Luard

Personal details
- Born: Christopher Montague Woodhouse; 11 May 1917
- Died: 13 February 2001 (aged 83)
- Party: Conservative
- Spouse: Lady Davidema Bulwer-Lytton (m. 1945; died 1995)
- Children: 3 (including Christopher, 6th Baron Terrington)
- Education: Winchester College
- Alma mater: New College, Oxford

Military service
- Allegiance: United Kingdom
- Branch/service: British Army
- Years of service: 1939–1945
- Rank: Colonel
- Unit: Royal Artillery; Special Operations Executive
- Battles/wars: Second World War
- Awards: Distinguished Service Order; Officer of the Order of the British Empire

Christopher Montague Woodhouse, 5th Baron Terrington (11 May 1917 – 13 February 2001), known as C. M. Woodhouse, was a British army SOE officer, MI6 intelligence officer and Conservative politician who served as Member of Parliament (MP) for Oxford from 1959 to 1966 and again from 1970 to 1974. He was also a visiting Fellow at Nuffield College, Oxford, from 1956 to 1964.

Terrington was an expert on Greek affairs after he first got involved with the resistance forces in Greece against the Germans during the Second World War, and then having served in the British Embassy.

== Early life and military service ==
Montague Woodhouse was the son of Horace Woodhouse, 3rd Baron Terrington, and Valerie Phillips, and was educated at Winchester College, and then at New College, Oxford, where he took a double first in Classics. After completing his education, he enlisted in the Royal Artillery in 1939 and served for the duration of the Second World War, being commissioned as an officer in 1940 and rising to the rank of colonel by 1943. He was awarded a Distinguished Service Order and appointed an Officer of the Order of the British Empire in 1944. He served most of his time in the war in Greece where his love for this country grew strong, as shown in his writings. In 1941 he was one of the SOE officers sent to Crete to organize the resistance forces behind enemy lines.

In September 1942 Woodhouse was parachuted to mainland Greece as the Second-in-Command of the Harling Force, headed by Eddie Myers, whose task was to blow up the Gorgopotamos bridge. Following the success of this operation Myers and Woodhouse were ordered by SOE Cairo to stay on in mainland Greece and form the British Military Mission. Initially their presence had only been intended for Operation Harling. Woodhouse, being one of only a few British officers on the mission who could speak Greek, was often sent off alone to make contact with political elements in Athens. Due to his imposing appearance of being tall with burning ginger beard this was no mean feat, but he succeeded in numerous trips into the Athenian suburbs, often still wearing British Army uniform. After Myers' dismissal in July 1943, at the request of the Foreign Office, Woodhouse became the head of the British Military Mission.

=== Government service ===
After the conclusion of the Second World War, Woodhouse served as Second Secretary at the British Embassy in Athens, Greece, until 1946, whereupon he returned to Britain, and served in a variety of industrial and academic appointments. In 1951, he was made a Fellow of the Royal Society of Literature. By 1952, when he was tasked with launching the CIA- and MI6-funded "left-of-centre" propaganda magazine Encounter in tandem with CIA's Michael Josselson and Lawrence de Neufville, he served in the secret Information Research Department of the Foreign Office.

From 1951 to 1952, he worked at the British Embassy in Tehran, Iran, and in 1952 and 1953 was involved in organising British aspects of the US/UK organised 1953 Iranian coup d'état. From July 1955 to October 1959 was the Director General at the Royal Institute of International Affairs.

== Operation Boot ==
In 1941, the Soviets and the British jointly invaded Iran to secure the oilfields and supply lines and deny support for the Germans. By the 1950s, Britain was concerned by possible chaos in Iran and an invasion by the USSR. From 1951 Woodhouse was a MI6 agent in Tehran, operating under cover of a Foreign Office appointment. In 1952, he was ordered to arm tribesmen in northern Iran to resist any Soviet attack. He brought weapons into Iran, flying them from RAF Habbaniya in Iraq, for a "resistance" movement that did not exist as yet.

Later in 1953 a covert mission to remove Mohammed Mossadegh from power was instigated by Britain's Churchill government and the U.S. Eisenhower administration. Mossadegh had become Iran's democratically elected prime minister and he had nationalised oil possessions of the British-owned Anglo-Iranian Oil Company (now British Petroleum) after Britain had refused to negotiate away its single most valuable foreign asset. While Woodhouse's initial mission in Iran was to smuggle weapons and cash to be used by the Rashidian brothers, when his predecessor Robin Zaehner left Iran, Woodhouse used Zaehner's contacts in Iran to further the overthrow of Mossadegh. Shortly prior to the expulsion of the British, Woodhouse took his contacts to the CIA station chief, Roger Goiran. Thus a conspiracy to overthrow Mossadegh was staged in a joint mission between the CIA and MI6. The CIA named the operation Operation TPAjax, erroneously referred to as Operation Ajax, TP standing for the Soviet-backed communist Tudeh Party of Iran. MI6 activities were codenamed Operation Boot.

Woodhouse proposed Operation Boot to the Eisenhower administration. It would use "disenchanted" Iranian elements of the army, the clergy, political parties, and the influence of the wealthy Rashidian brothers to oust Mossadegh. Together with the CIA he instigated and planned the "bazaaris" of Tehran to demonstrate against the Mossadegh administration. Woodhouse, through the Shah's sister, encouraged the ruler not to abandon the throne.

== Parliamentary career ==
Woodhouse entered Parliament in 1959 and later served in the Conservative governments of Harold Macmillan and Alec Douglas-Home as Parliamentary Secretary for Aviation from 1961 to 1962 and then Under-Secretary of State for the Home Department from 1962 to 1964.

He was defeated by Evan Luard in the 1966 Labour landslide and then worked at the Confederation of British Industry until 1970, when he was once again returned to Parliament for Oxford. He retained his seat in the February 1974 general election, but lost it (again to Evan Luard) in October.

Woodhouse succeeded to the barony on the death of his elder brother David Woodhouse, 4th Baron Terrington, in 1998. He lost his seat in the House of Lords in the following year as a result of the changes introduced by the House of Lords Act 1999.

== Marriage and children ==
Lord Terrington married Davidema Crichton, Countess of Erne (née Lady Davidema Katharine Cynthia Mary Millicent Bulwer-Lytton (1909–1995), daughter of Victor Bulwer-Lytton, 2nd Earl of Lytton, and widow of John Crichton, 5th Earl Erne, on 28 August 1945. They had three children:

- Christopher Richard James Woodhouse, 6th Baron Terrington (born 20 September 1946)
- Hon. Nicholas Michael John Woodhouse (born 27 February 1949)
- Hon. Emma Davina Mary Woodhouse (born April 1954)

== Writings ==
Woodhouse was the author of several books, including:

- Apple of Discord: A Survey of Recent Greek Politics in their International Setting (Hutchinson & Co., 1948)
  - "Το μήλο της έριδος". Αθήνα: Εξάντας, 1976
- Modern Greece: A Short History (1968)
- The Philhellenes (1971)
- Capodistria: The Founder of Greek Independence (Oxford University Press, 1973)
- The Struggle for Greece (1976)
- Karamanlis: The Restorer of Greek Democracy (1982)
- Something Ventured (1982) autobiography
- The Rise and Fall of the Greek Colonels (1985)
- George Gemistos Plethon - The Last of the Hellenes (1986)
- Rhigas Velestinlis: the proto-Martyr of the Greek Revolution (1995) ISBN 960-7120-09-4

Shortly before his death, Woodhouse, who succeeded to the family title in 1998, completed the translation into English of the 10-volume "History of the European Spirit", by his friend, the former Prime Minister of Greece, Panayiotis Kanellopoulos.

== Arms ==
Coat of arms of Montague Woodhouse, 5th Baron Terrington
| Crest Issuant out of a wreath of roses Argent barbed and seeded Proper a demi-woodman also Proper supporting in the dexter hand an axe Or. Escutcheon Per fess Or and Azure a hurst of oak trees issuant in chief Proper and two bars wavy in base Argent. Supporters On either side an Airedale terrier Proper gorged with a ducal coronet Or. Motto Labor Omnia Vincit |

== Notes ==
Parliament of the United Kingdom
| Preceded by Lawrence Turner | Member of Parliament for Oxford; 1959–1966 | Succeeded by Evan Luard |
| Preceded by Evan Luard | Member of Parliament for Oxford; 1970–1974 | Succeeded by Evan Luard |
Political offices
| Preceded by Geoffrey Rippon | Parliamentary Secretary for Aviation; 1961–1962 | Succeeded by Basil de Ferranti |
Peerage of the United Kingdom
| Preceded by David Woodhouse | Baron Terrington; 1998–2001; Member of the House of Lords (1998–1999) | Succeeded by Christopher Woodhouse |
