= Stalybridge (constituency) =

Parliamentary constituency in the United Kingdom, 1868–1918

- Former borough constituency for the House of Commons
- County: Cheshire
- Major settlements: Stalybridge

1868–1918
- Seats: One
- Created from: North Cheshire; South Lancashire (parts of)
- Replaced by: Stalybridge & Hyde; Mossley

Stalybridge officially sometimes written in early years as Staleybridge was a constituency represented in the House of Commons of the UK Parliament from 1868 until 1918 by one MP. It comprised the borough of Stalybridge which lay in Lancashire and Cheshire and which is in the east of today's Greater Manchester. On abolition for the 1918 general election under the Representation of the People Act 1918 the seat's main replacement became Stalybridge and Hyde.

== Creation, boundaries and abolition ==
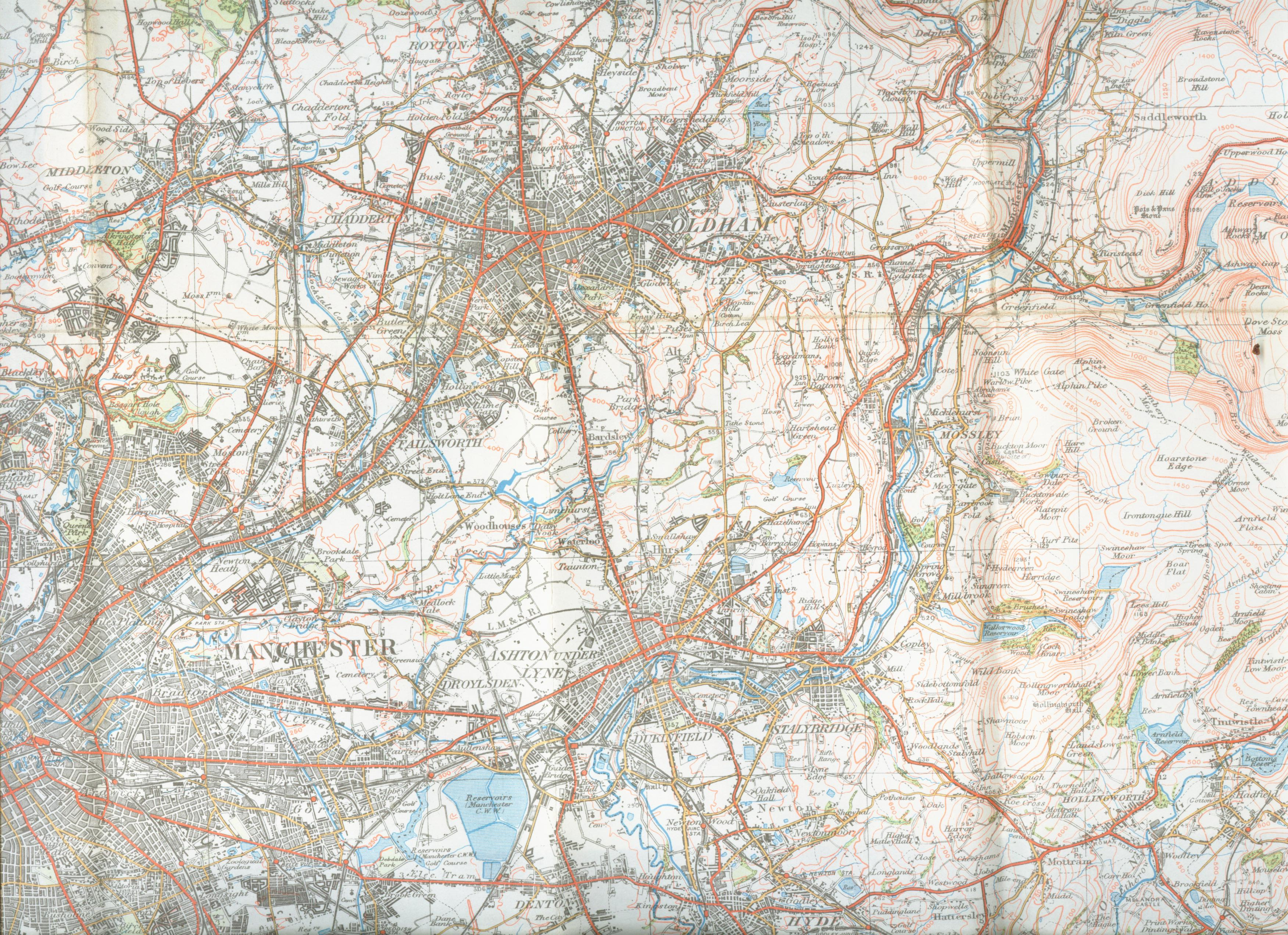
Map of the wider area in 1924. The seat took in the south-easternmost part of Lancashire and lay within the ancient Salford hundred division of Lancashire, skirting the more densely populated north bank of the Tame at Ashton under Lyne, taking in parts of historic Cheshire and both banks of the river above Ashton.

Parliament created this seat under the Reform Act 1867, the part of the second Reform Act that covered England and Wales, which defined its components as the:

- Municipal Borough of Stalybridge
- The remaining portion of the township of Dukinfield
- Township of Stalley
- The District of the Local Board of Health of Mossley

It was marginally expanded in line with a local government change under the Redistribution of Seats Act 1885, to be:

Name of parliamentary borough	Contents and boundaries
Stalybridge	So much of the Municipal Borough of Stalybridge as it not included in the said Parliamentary borough.

The seat was abolished by the Representation of the People Act 1918, with the majority of its electorate being included in the new constituency of Stalybridge and Hyde. A small area which was now part of the municipal borough of Mossley in Lancashire was added to the new constituency of Mossley.

== Members of Parliament ==
- 1868 Constituency created

Previously part of North Cheshire and South Lancashire

Election	Member	Party
1868	James Sidebottom	Conservative
1871 by-election	Nathaniel Buckley	Liberal
1874	Tom Harrop Sidebottom	Conservative
1880	William Summers	Liberal
1885	Tom Harrop Sidebottom	Conservative
1900	Matthew White Ridley	Conservative
1905 by-election	John Frederick Cheetham	Liberal
Jan. 1910	John Wood	Conservative
1918 Constituency abolished: see Stalybridge and Hyde

== Elections ==
Decades:	1860s; 1870s; 1880s; 1890s; 1900s; 1910s

=== Elections in the 1860s ===
General election 1868: Stalybridge
Party	Candidate	Votes	%	±%
Conservative	James Sidebottom	2,405	53.6	
Liberal	Nathaniel Buckley	2,078	46.4	
Majority		327	7.2	
Turnout		4,483	84.0	
Registered electors		5,338		
Conservative win (new seat)				

=== Elections in the 1870s ===
Sidebottom's death caused a by-election.

By-election, 1 Mar 1871: Stalybridge
Party	Candidate	Votes	%	±%
Liberal	Nathaniel Buckley	2,198	51.9	+5.5
Conservative	Francis Powell	2,033	48.1	−5.5
Majority		165	3.8	N/A
Turnout		4,231	86.0	+2.0
Registered electors		4,918		
Liberal gain from Conservative		Swing	+5.5	

Sidebottom

General election 1874: Stalybridge
Party	Candidate	Votes	%	±%
Conservative	Thomas Harrop Sidebottom	2,378	51.7	−1.9
Liberal	Nathaniel Buckley	2,220	48.3	+1.9
Majority		158	3.4	−3.8
Turnout		4,598	89.6	+5.6
Registered electors		5,129		
Conservative hold		Swing	−1.9	

=== Elections in the 1880s ===
General election 1880: Stalybridge
Party	Candidate	Votes	%	±%
Liberal	William Summers	2,706	51.6	+3.3
Conservative	Thomas Harrop Sidebottom	2,542	48.4	−3.3
Majority		164	3.2	N/A
Turnout		5,248	93.6	+4.0
Registered electors		5,606		
Liberal gain from Conservative		Swing	+3.3	

General election 1885: Stalybridge
Party	Candidate	Votes	%	±%
Conservative	Thomas Harrop Sidebottom	3,169	51.8	+3.4
Liberal	William Summers	2,950	48.2	−3.4
Majority		219	3.6	N/A
Turnout		6,119	95.3	+1.7
Registered electors		6,424		
Conservative gain from Liberal		Swing	+3.4	

General election 1886: Stalybridge
Party	Candidate	Votes	%	±%
Conservative	Thomas Harrop Sidebottom	3,220	55.0	+3.2
Liberal	John Webb Probyn	2,638	45.0	−3.2
Majority		582	10.0	+6.4
Turnout		5,858	91.2	−4.1
Registered electors		6,424		
Conservative hold		Swing	+3.2	

=== Elections in the 1890s ===
General election 1892: Stalybridge
Party	Candidate	Votes	%	±%
Conservative	Thomas Harrop Sidebottom	3,280	52.7	−2.3
Liberal	Joshua Macer Wright	2,943	47.3	+2.3
Majority		337	5.4	−4.6
Turnout		6,223	92.8	+1.6
Registered electors		6,703		
Conservative hold		Swing	-2.3	

General election 1895: Stalybridge
Party	Candidate	Votes	%	±%
Conservative	Thomas Harrop Sidebottom	3,389	55.1	+2.4
Liberal	Joshua Macer Wright	2,757	44.9	−2.4
Majority		632	10.2	+4.8
Turnout		6,146	88.1	−4.7
Registered electors		6,980		
Conservative hold		Swing	+2.4	

=== Elections in the 1900s ===
General election 1900: Stalybridge
Party	Candidate	Votes	%	±%
Conservative	Matthew White Ridley	3,321	50.6	−4.5
Liberal	John Frederick Cheetham	3,241	49.4	+4.5
Majority		80	1.2	−9.0
Turnout		6,562	88.0	−0.1
Registered electors		7,461		
Conservative hold		Swing	-4.5	

Cheetham

1905 Stalybridge by-election
Party	Candidate	Votes	%	±%
Liberal	John Frederick Cheetham	4,029	56.7	+7.3
Conservative	James Travis-Clegg	3,078	43.3	−7.3
Majority		951	13.4	N/A
Turnout		7,107	93.5	+5.5
Registered electors		7,601		
Liberal gain from Conservative		Swing	+7.3	

General election 1906: Stalybridge
Party	Candidate	Votes	%	±%
Liberal	John Frederick Cheetham	3,836	53.1	+3.7
Conservative	James Travis-Clegg	3,382	46.9	−3.7
Majority		454	6.2	N/A
Turnout		7,218	93.8	+5.8
Registered electors		7,691		
Liberal gain from Conservative		Swing	+3.7	

=== Elections in the 1910s ===
General election January 1910: Stalybridge
Party	Candidate	Votes	%	±%
Conservative	John Wood	3,736	50.4	+3.5
Liberal	Allan Heywood Bright	3,679	49.6	−3.5
Majority		57	0.8	N/A
Turnout		7,415	94.3	+0.5
Registered electors		7,860		
Conservative gain from Liberal		Swing	+3.5	

General election December 1910: Stalybridge
Party	Candidate	Votes	%	±%
Conservative	John Wood	3,807	52.7	+2.3
Liberal	Allan Heywood Bright	3,414	47.3	−2.3
Majority		393	5.4	+4.6
Turnout		7,221	91.9	−2.4
Registered electors		7,860		
Conservative hold		Swing	+2.3	

General Election 1914–15:

Another General Election was required to take place before the end of 1915. The political parties had been making preparations for an election to take place and by the July 1914, the following candidates had been selected;

- Unionist: John Wood
- Liberal: Walter Kenyon

== See also ==
- History of parliamentary constituencies and boundaries in Cheshire

== Sources ==
- Leigh Rayment's Historical List of MPs – Constituencies beginning with "S" (part 4)
