= Christopher Woodhouse, 6th Baron Terrington =

British peer and emeritus Professor of Adolescent Urology

Professor Christopher Richard James Woodhouse, 6th Baron Terrington (born 20 September 1946), is a British peer and emeritus Professor of Adolescent Urology, University College London.

Terrington was born in 1946, the elder son of Montague Woodhouse, 5th Baron Terrington, and Lady Davidema Katharine Cynthia Mary Millicent Bulwer-Lytton, a daughter of Victor Bulwer-Lytton, 2nd Earl of Lytton. He was educated at Winchester College and Guy's Hospital Medical School. Throughout his academic career he was an active coxswain, steering Winchester College, University of London and Leander Club crews.

Terrington became a urological surgeon in 1977. He was senior registrar at the Institute of Urology from 1977 to 1981 and senior lecturer from 1981 until 1997. In the latter year he moved to University College Hospital as Reader in Adolescent Urology, and professor from 2006. He was clinical director of urology at the same institution from 2001 to 2003. He was a consultant at St George's Hospital from 1985 to 1995 but did most of his work at St James' Hospital SW12 until it was closed and has occupied the same position at the Royal Marsden Hospital since 1981 as well as that of honorary consultant at Great Ormond Street Hospital since 1981 until retirement in 2014..

He became a Fellow of the Royal College of Surgeons in 1975. He is a member of the American Association of Genito Urinary Surgeons (since 2004).In addition, Terrington has been an honorary member of the Australasian Urological Association since 1999, the German Association of Urology since 2004 and Sa secial member of the American Association of Urology since 2012. He was Chairman of the British Journal of Urology fInternational rom 2000 to 2010 and President of Genito-Urinary Reconstructive Surgeons (USA) in 2002.

He inherited his title when his father died in 2001. He was an unsuccessful candidate for election as a crossbench hereditary peer in the House of Lords by-election held in May 2008.

== Marriage and children ==
Terrington married Hon. Anna Margaret Philipps, the daughter of Hugo Philipps, 3rd Baron Milford, on 27 February 1975. They have two children:

- Hon. Jack Henry Lehmann Woodhouse (born 7 December 1978), heir apparent to the barony.
- Hon. Constance Margaret Davina Woodhouse (born 1 January 1982)

== Publications ==
- With F. D. Thompson: Disorders of the Kidney and Urinary Tract (1987) ISBN 0-7131-4412-2
- Long-Term Paediatric Urology (1991) ISBN 0-632-02936-6
- With others: Management of Urological Emergencies (2004) ISBN 1-84184-177-3
- Adolescent Urology and long-term outcomes (2015) ISBN 978-1-118-84481-6
- With A.Kirkham: Radiology and follow-up of urological surgery (2018) ISBN 978-1-119-16208-7
- Numerous book chapters and research papers (listed in Google Scholar) in learned journals.

== Arms ==
Coat of arms of Christopher Woodhouse, 6th Baron Terrington
Crest Issuant out of a wreath of roses Argent barbed and seeded Proper a demi-woodman also Proper supporting in the dexter hand an axe Or. Escutcheon Per fess Or and Azure a hurst of oak trees issuant in chief Proper and two bars wavy in base Argent. Supporters On either side an Airedale terrier Proper gorged with a ducal coronet Or. Motto Labor Omnia Vincit

Peerage of the United Kingdom
Preceded by Montague Woodhouse	Baron Terrington; 2001–present	Incumbent; Heir apparent: Hon. Jack Woodhouse
