= Nathaniel Buckley =

British politician

Nathaniel Buckley (1821 – 23 March 1892) was a British landowner, cotton mill owner and Liberal Party politician. In November 1855 he was elected Mayor of Ashton-under-Lyne.

At the 1868 general election he was Liberal candidate for the constituency of Stalybridge, but was defeated by his Conservative opponent, James Sidebottom. Sidebottom died in February 1871 causing a by-election. Initially the local Liberal Party selected the Honourable Edward Lyuth Stanley as their candidate, but following a number of delegations of "working men", Buckley was chosen. The by-election was held on 28 February and Buckley won the seat by 208 votes.

By the 1870s, Buckley was a millionaire. In 1873, he purchased the Galtee estate of the Earl of Kingston, near Mitchelstown, County Cork, Ireland. Following a revaluation, he issued rent demands to his new tenants of between fifty and five hundred per cent. This led to a great deal of agrarian unrest, evictions and an attempted assassination of Buckley's land agent. His actions also demonstrated weaknesses in the Irish Land Acts, which were consequently amended.

Buckley was appointed as a Deputy Lieutenant of Lancashire in 1867.

At the 1874 general election Buckley was defeated by the Conservative candidate, Thomas Harrop Sidebottom. He did not return to parliament.

At the time of his death, aged 71, in 1892, he had residences at Alderdale Lodge, Droylsden, Lancashire and Galtee Castle, County Cork.

Parliament of the United Kingdom
Preceded by James Sidebottom	Member of Parliament for Stalybridge; 1871 – 1874	Succeeded by Tom Harrop Sidebottom
