= North Huddersfield Trust School =

Location
- Woodhouse Hall Road; Fartown; Huddersfield, West Yorkshire, HD2 1DJ; England
- 53.6659°N 1.7697°W

Information
- Type: Foundation school
- Local authority: Kirklees
- Department for Education URN: 136502 Tables
- Ofsted: Reports
- Headteacher: Andrew Fell
- Gender: Coeducational
- Age: 11 to 16
- Enrolment: 899 as of January 2023
- Website: http://www.bbgacademy.com/

North Huddersfield Trust School (formerly Fartown High School) is a coeducational secondary school located in the Fartown area of Huddersfield, West Yorkshire, England.

Previously a community school administered by Kirklees Metropolitan Borough Council, in September 2011 Fartown High School was formally closed and replaced with North Huddersfield Trust School on the same site. The school is now administered by North Huddersfield Trust. Trust partners include Kirklees College, the University of Huddersfield and Kirklees Metropolitan Borough Council.

North Huddersfield Trust School offers GCSEs and BTECs as programmes of study for pupils, as well as some vocational courses offered in conjunction with Kirklees College. The school also has an adult education provision for the local community.

== Former teachers ==
=== Fartown High School ===
- Adam karem physics teacher, taught for eight years, and a county 800m champion, from Longwood, a former British Polytechnic Sports Association champion, known for the 1997 Boddingtons ice cream van advert with Melanie Sykes
