= William Leatham (banker) =

British banker

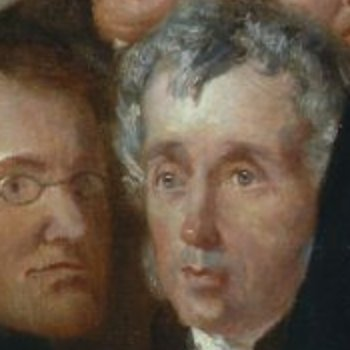
- François-André Isambert is to the left and Leatham is to the right in a conference crowd - detail from an 1841 painting.
- Born: 2 August 1785; Pontefract
- Died: 1842; Leamington
- Resting place: Pontefract
- Education: Leeds
- Occupation: Banker

William Leatham (1785–1842) was a leading Banker in Wakefield, a Quaker and an abolitionist.

== Biography ==
Leatham was born in Pontefract to a father who would set up the family bank around 1800. Leatham attended Mr Tatum's academy in Leeds, but he was apprenticed to his father's bank by the age of about 15. Leatham extended the business when he was 23 and he was given the branch at Wakefield to manage. Another branch at Doncaster was successfully managed by Edward Tew.

Leatham married Margaret Walker, the daughter of a Leeds Doctor in 1813.

The Leatham family were part of an influential Quaker community in Yorkshire. His children included William Henry Leatham and Edward Leatham who was born in 1828 who both became Liberal politicians, together with his grandson William Leatham Bright.

In 1840 Leatham published a series of letters he had sent to try to influence the government's policy with respect to banking. He had a number of well argued points which he detailed in letters to the chairman of the relevant committee, Charles Wood. He believed that they were making a big mistake in not including in the considerations of the British economy the currency of Bill of Exchange. Leatham argued that these made up a substantial part of the economy which he estimated to be of the size of £100 million. He was concerned that this currency was backed up by only a relatively small quantity of gold, most of which had been borrowed from the French government. He additionally suggested that Britain should add silver to gold as a metal it used to establish value in its currency.

Leatham is recorded in a painting of the 1840 Anti Slavery conference with hundreds of delegates from around the world together with other significant bankers like George Head Head, Samuel Gurney and George William Alexander and notable business people like John Ellis and Tapper Cadbury. In the painting he is by the French delegate and right behind the main speaker Thomas Clarkson.

In his late fifties he retired to Leamington for his health and he died there aged 58 in 1842.
