= Tom Harrop Sidebottom =

British politician (1826–1908)

Sidebottom in 1895.

Thomas Harrop Sidebottom (16 April 1826 – 25 May 1908) was a British businessman and Conservative Party politician.

He was the eldest son of William Sidebottom of Etherow House, Hollingworth, Cheshire. Following education at Manchester Grammar School, he followed his father into business as a cotton spinner and manufacturer in the city. He was a director of the Manchester, Sheffield and Lincolnshire Railway and was considered an authority on bimetallism.

Sidebottom was appointed a justice of the peace for the counties of Cheshire and Derbyshire and in 1886 married Edith Murgatroyd of Didsbury.

At the 1874 general election he was elected as Conservative Member of Parliament (MP) for Stalybridge. He was unseated by his Liberal opponent at the ensuing election in 1880, but regained the seat in 1885. He retired from parliament at the 1900 general election.

== Death ==
Tom Harrop Sidebottom died at Etherow House in May 1908, aged 82.

== Sources ==
- Obituary, The Times, 26 May 1908, p. 13

Parliament of the United Kingdom
| Preceded by Nathaniel Buckley | Member of Parliament for Stalybridge; 1874 – 1880 | Succeeded by William Summers |
| Preceded by William Summers | Member of Parliament for Stalybridge; 1885 – 1900 | Succeeded by Matthew White Ridley |
