= John Foster Fraser =

Scottish travel author (1868-1936)

John Fraser
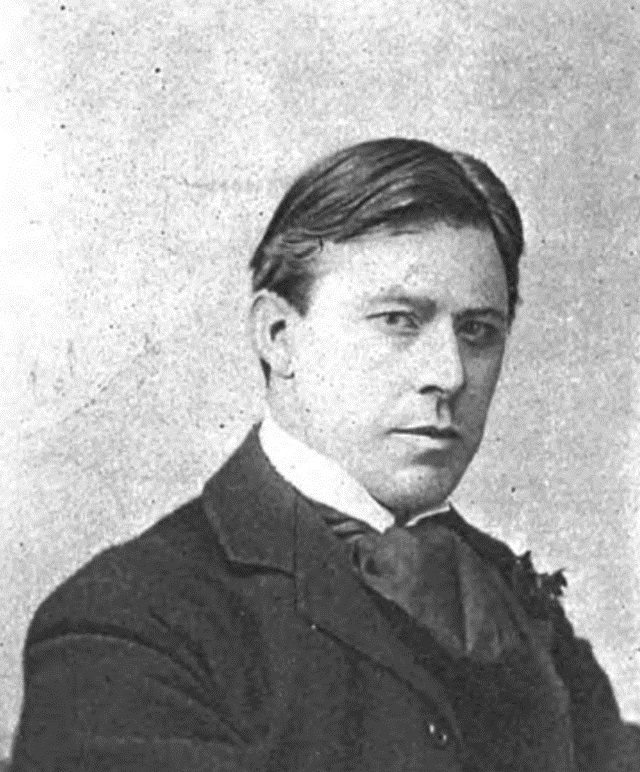
- Born: 13 June 1868; Edinburgh, Scotland
- Died: 7 June 1936 (aged 67); London, England
- Occupations: author, bicyclist

Sir John Foster Fraser (13 June 1868 – 7 June 1936) was a Scottish travel author. In July 1896, he and two friends, Samuel Edward Lunn and Francis Herbert Lowe, took a bicycle trip around the world riding Rover safety bicycles. They covered 19,237 miles in two years and two months, travelling through 17 countries and across three continents. He documented the trip in the book Round the World on a Wheel.

Between books he was a journalist. In 1901 while working for The Yorkshire Post he wrote, among other things, a 16-page description of Queen Victoria's funeral. In the UK in 1916 he lectured on What I Saw in Russia. His works were coloured by the prejudices and perceptions that were prevalent among his social class at the time. For example, his 1915 book The Conquering Jew contains many sweeping generalizations about international Jewish communities that blend philosemitic and antisemitic assumptions.

Fraser was knighted in the 1917 Birthday Honours.

He died in London on 7 June 1936.

== Bibliography ==
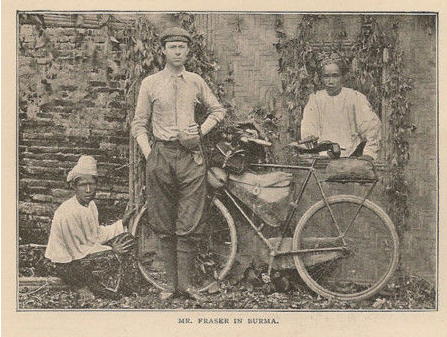
Fraser in Burma

- The Dancer of Koom Ombo. 1897.
- Round the World on a Wheel. London : Methuen & Co., 1899. 558 pages.
- America at Work. London: Cassell & Co., 1903. 364 pages. German translation available.
- The Real Siberia, Together with an Account of a Dash Through Manchuria. London: Cassell & Co., 1904. 420 pages.
- Canada as It Is. London: Cassell & Co., 1905. 420 pages.
- Pictures from the Balkans. London: Cassell & Co., 1906. 298 pages.
- Red Russia. New York: The John Lane Company, 1907. 403 pages.
- Life's Contrasts. London: Cassell & Co., 1908. 339 pages.
- Quaint Subjects of the King. 1909.
- The British Empire and What it Means. 1910.
- Australia, the Making of a Nation. London: Cassell & Co., 1912. 446 pages. Also available on microfilm.
- The Land of Veiled Women: Some Wandering in Algeria, Tunisia and Morocco. London: Cassell & Co., 1913. 288 pages.
- Panama and What it Means. London: Cassell & Co., 1913. 410 pages. French translation available.
- The Amazing Argentine: A New Land of Enterprise. London: Funk & Wagnalls, Co., 1914. 408 pages.
- Deeds That Never Die: Stories of Heroism in the Great War. London: Cassell & Co., 1914. 242 pages.
- The Conquering Jew. London: Cassell & Co., 1915. OCLC 940444060. 304 pages. Also available from Google Books.
- Russia of To-day. London: Funk & Wagnalls, Co., 1915. 296 pages.
- The Red Passport. London: Chapman and Hall, 1918. 248 pages.
