= James Sidebottom =

James Sidebottom (June 1824 – 14 February 1871) was a British businessman and Conservative Party politician.

He was the youngest son of Edward Sidebottom, and was born at "The Hydes", Stalybridge, Cheshire. The Sidebottoms were a prominent family in the town, both in business and administrative matters. James attended Manchester Grammar School before becoming a member of the family cotton manufacturing firm of Edward Sidebottom and Sons.

Sidebottom entered the local government of Stalybridge as a member of the police commissioners. When the town was incorporated as a municipal borough in 1857, he was elected as one of the corporation's first aldermen. In 1864 he was chosen as mayor of the borough, and held the office for three years in succession. As mayor he laid the foundation stone of the Victoria Market Hall in 1868.

In 1868 Stalybridge was enfranchised as a parliamentary borough, returning one Member of Parliament (MP) to the House of Commons. Sidebottom was nominated as the Conservative candidate, and was elected as the town's first MP.

He became ill in 1870, and died at his residence "Acre Banks", Stalybridge, in February 1871, aged 46.

Parliament of the United Kingdom
New constituency	Member of Parliament for Stalybridge; 1868 – 1871	Succeeded by Nathaniel Buckley
