= Times Guide to the House of Commons =

British political reference guide book

The Times Guide to the House of Commons is a political reference guide book published by Times Newspapers giving coverage of general elections in the United Kingdom.

Following most general elections since 1880, the book has been published. The contents usually include the following;

- a summary of general election results.
- lists of Members of Parliament (MPs) elected to the House of Commons and government ministers, including defeated and retiring MPs and ministers in the House of Lords.
- a history of the previous Parliament and the events leading up to the general election.
- reviews of the election campaign.
- a list of opinion polls held throughout the election campaign.
- election results by constituency, and a photograph and biographical details of every MP.
- from 1929 to 1997, as well as containing biographical details of every MP, the books carried biographical details of every unsuccessful candidate at the last election.
- since 2001, the biographies of unsuccessful candidates have been replaced by a description of the constituency.
- a list of by-election results of the previous Parliament.
- a statistical breakdown of election results by countries, counties, cities, etc., and a comparison with the previous general election results.
- the full text of the manifestos of major political parties, and summaries of manifestos for minor political parties.
- an index of all election candidates.
- a fold-up map of British constituencies illustrating the election results.

The most recent version of the book tends to be available for around a year after publication, although older editions have in some cases become rare collector's items.

== Books in the series ==
- The Times Guide to the House of Commons, 1880 (Times Books, London, 1880)
- The Times Guide to the House of Commons, 1885 (Times Books, London, 1885)
- The Times Guide to the House of Commons, 1886 (Times Books, London, 1886)
- The Times Guide to the House of Commons, 1892 (Macmillan and Co., London, 1892)
- The Times Guide to the House of Commons, 1895 (Macmillan and Co., London, 1895)
- The Times Guide to the House of Commons, 1900 (Macmillan and Co., London, 1900)
- (No Guide was produced for the Parliament of 1906-10)
- The Times Guide to the House of Commons, 1910 (Times Books, London, 1910)
- The Times Guide to the House of Commons, 1911 (Times Books, London, 1911)
- The Times Guide to the House of Commons, 1919 (Times Books, London, 1919)
- (No Guide was produced for the Parliament of 1922-3)
- (No Guide was produced for the Parliament of 1923-4)
- (No Guide was produced for the Parliament of 1924-9)
- The Times Guide to the House of Commons, 1929 (Times Books, London, 1929)
- The Times Guide to the House of Commons, 1931 (Times Books, London, 1931)
- The Times Guide to the House of Commons, 1935 (Times Books, London, 1935)
- The Times Guide to the House of Commons, 1945 (Times Books, London, 1945)
- The Times Guide to the House of Commons, 1950 (Times Books, London, 1950)
- The Times Guide to the House of Commons, 1951 (Times Books, London, 1951)
- The Times Guide to the House of Commons, 1955 (Times Books, London, 1955)
- The Times Guide to the House of Commons, 1959 (Times Books, London, 1959)
- The Times Guide to the House of Commons, 1964 (Times Books, London, 1964)
- The Times Guide to the House of Commons, 1966 (Times Books, London, 1966)
- The Times Guide to the House of Commons, 1970 (Times Books, London, 1970)
- The Times Guide to the House of Commons, February 1974 (Times Books, London, 1974)
- The Times Guide to the House of Commons, October 1974 (Times Books, London, 1974)
- The Times Guide to the House of Commons, May 1979 (Times Books, London, 1979)
- The Times Guide to the House of Commons, June 1983 (Times Books, London, 1983)
- The Times Guide to the House of Commons, June 1983, Revised edition, 1984 (Times Books, London, 1984)

This is the only edition to have been printed in paperback.

- The Times Guide to the House of Commons, June 1987 (Times Books, London, 1987)
- The Times Guide to the House of Commons, April 1992 (Times Books, London, 1992)
- The Times Guide to the House of Commons, May 1997 (Times Books, London, 1997)
- The Times Guide to the House of Commons, June 2001 (Times Books, London, 2001)
- The Times Guide to the House of Commons, May 2005 (Times Books, London, 2005)
- The Times Guide to the House of Commons, May 2010 (Times Books, London, 2010)
- The Times Guide to the House of Commons, May 2015 (Times Books, London, 2015) ISBN 978-0008126315
- The Times Guide to the House of Commons, 2017 (Times Books, London, 2017) ISBN 978-0008263331
- The Times Guide to the House of Commons, 2019 (Times Books, London, 2020) ISBN 978-0008392581
- The Times Guide to the House of Commons, 2024 (Times Books, London, 2024) ISBN 978-0008726751

=== Reprints ===
In 2003-4, Politico's Publishing reprinted two omnibus volumes containing the rare guides for 1910, 1911, 1919, 1929, 1931 and 1935. They had intended to research and publish original election guides for 1906, 1922, 1923 and 1924—which were all years in which no election guide was produced—and David Boothroyd was commissioned for this project. However, a change of management at the company led to this being abandoned. The omnibus books reprinted were:

- Iain Dale (ed.), The Times Guide to the House of Commons, 1910, 1911, 1919 (Politico's, London, 2004) ISBN 9781842750346
- Iain Dale (ed.), The Times Guide to the House of Commons, 1929, 1931, 1935 (Politico's, London, 2003) ISBN 9781842750339

These volumes reproduced every page of the originals, including adverts, except for the fold-out constituency maps.

There had also been plans to reprint the volumes for 1880–1900 in two more omnibuses, which were also abandoned with the change of management.

== See also ==
- Almanac of American Politics
