= Fartown, Huddersfield =

District of Huddersfield, West Yorkshire, England

Coordinates: 53.662°N 1.781°W

Fartown
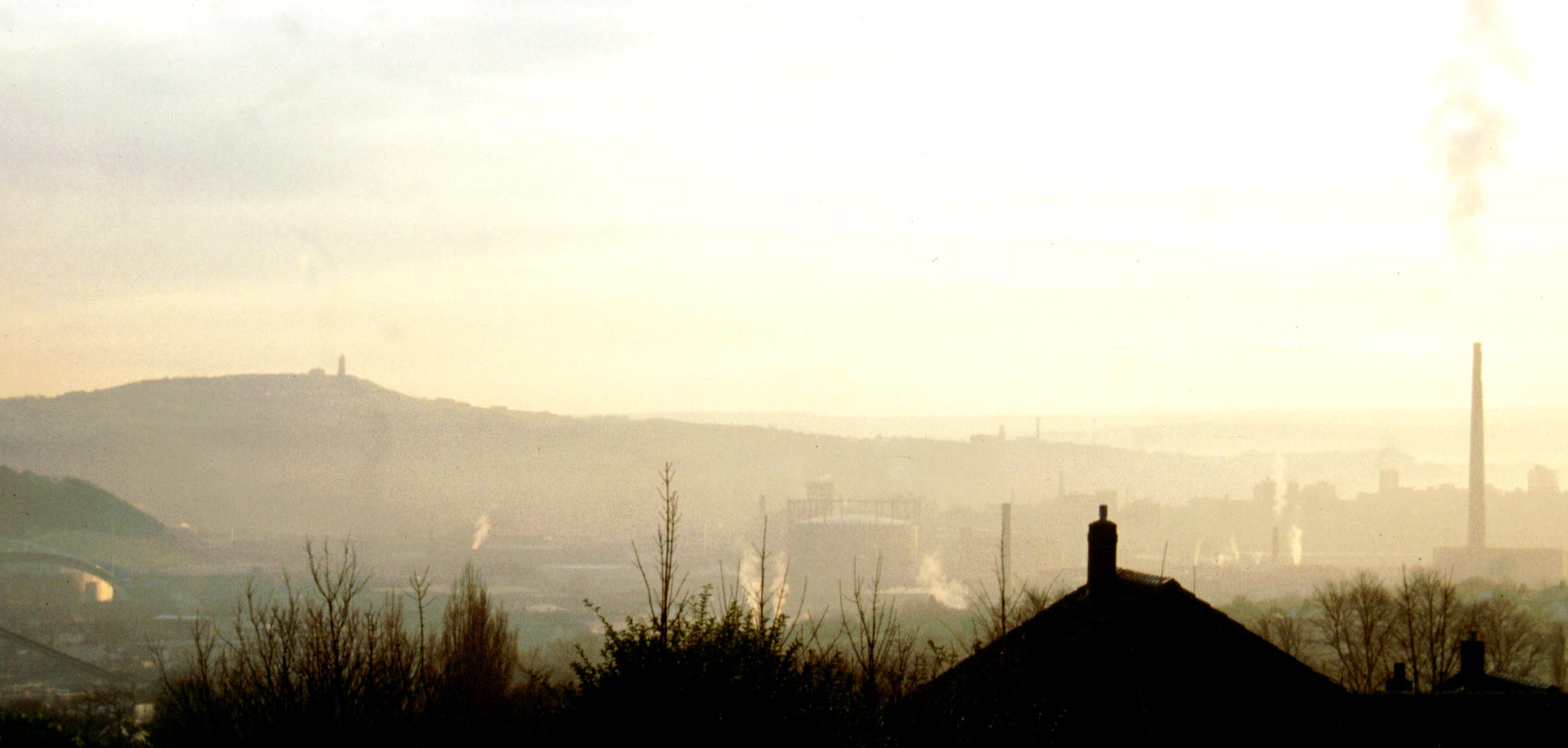
- View from the top of Woodhouse Hill

- Location within West Yorkshire
- Metropolitan borough: Kirklees
- Metropolitan county: West Yorkshire
- Region: Yorkshire and the Humber
- Country: England
- Sovereign state: United Kingdom
- Post town: HUDDERSFIELD
- Postcode district: HD2
- Dialling code: 01484
- Police: West Yorkshire
- Fire: West Yorkshire
- Ambulance: Yorkshire
- UK Parliament: Huddersfield

Fartown is a suburb of Huddersfield, West Yorkshire, England that starts 0.6 miles (1 km) north of the town centre.

Fartown runs for approximately 1 mile (1.6 km) either side of the A641 main Huddersfield to Bradford Road. The district area stretches from the top of Woodhouse Hill to the Halifax Old Road with a population of 4,735 according to the 2001 Census.

Fartown currently has a multi-ethnic population with a significant percentage of people hailing from South Asian and West Indian backgrounds.

Two major hills are also situated in Fartown, Woodhouse Hill towards Sheepridge and York Avenue towards Cowcliffe. North Huddersfield Trust School is situated just off Woodhouse Hill.

Huddersfield's Rugby League club Huddersfield RLFC played at the Fartown Ground on Spaines Road from 1878 until 1992 and are still referred to as ‘Fartown’ by the club’s supporters. Yorkshire County Cricket Club also played there at the cricket part of the ground between 1873–1955 and was also used for one day matches until 1982. The ground hosted an FA Cup semi final in 1882. The ground there now is little used for sporting events.

== Trivia ==
Fartown's name was cited as "nice, isn't it?" and "just ridiculous" in the XFM radio show presented by Ricky Gervais in 2003.

A house in Ashfield Street was used as the main family home in the British feature film Between Two Women.

== See also ==
- Listed buildings in Huddersfield (Greenhead Ward)
