= NCCA =

NCCA may refer to:

- National Centre for Computer Animation, part of the Media School at Bournemouth University in the United Kingdom
- National Centre for Contemporary Arts, a museum, exhibition and research organization in Moscow, Russia
- National Center for Credibility Assessment, a part of Defense Counterintelligence and Security Agency (DCSA), USA
- National Championship of College A Cappella, former name of International Championship of Collegiate A Cappella, a singing competition
- National Collegiate Cycling Association, a division of USA Cycling
- National Commission for Certifying Agencies, the accreditation body of the Institute for Credentialing Excellence
- National Commission for Culture and the Arts, official arts council of the Philippines
- National Council for Curriculum and Assessment, a statutory organization that provides the primary school and post-primary curriculum in Ireland
- National Council of Churches in Australia, an ecumenical organisation
- Neuroblastoma Children's Cancer Alliance UK, charity that helps children and families
- Nigerian Civil Aviation Authority
- Northern Centre for Contemporary Art, Darwin, Australia

== See also ==
- NCAA (disambiguation)
