= Crewe =

Town in Cheshire, England

Coordinates: 53.099°N 2.44°W

- Town
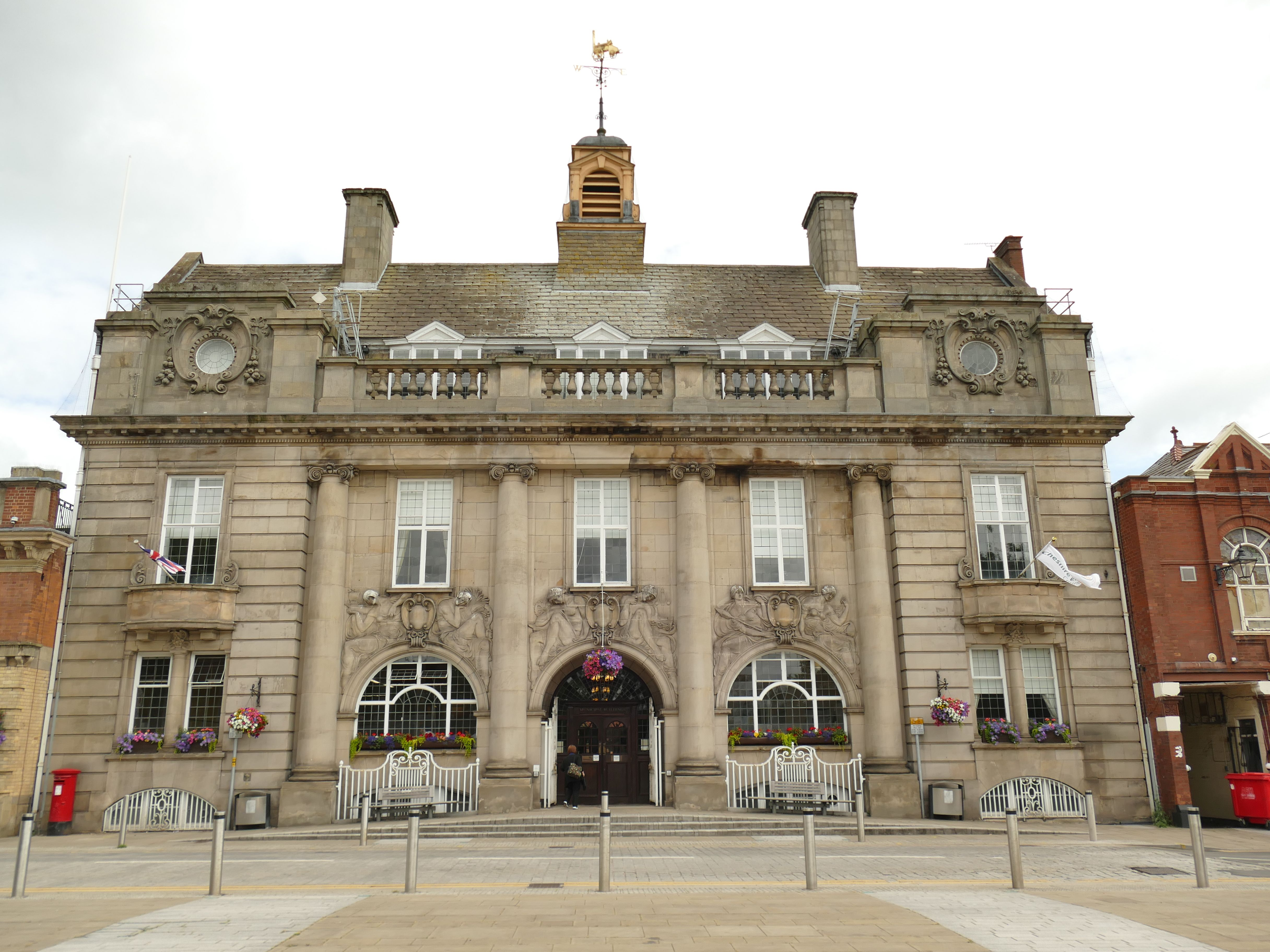
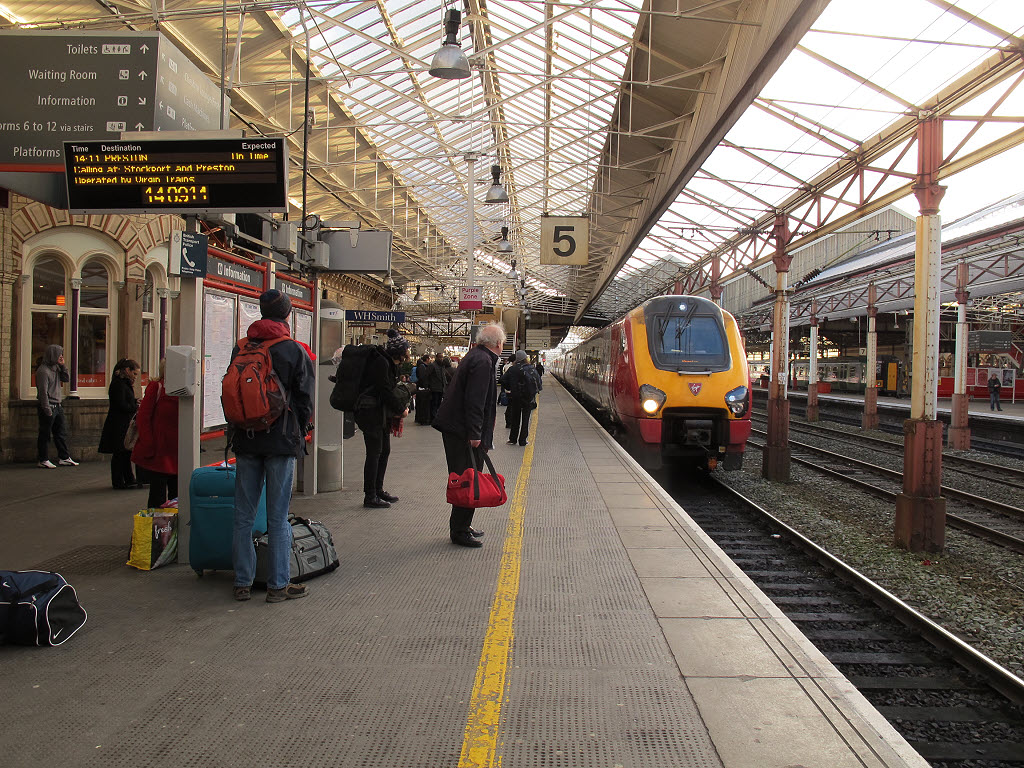
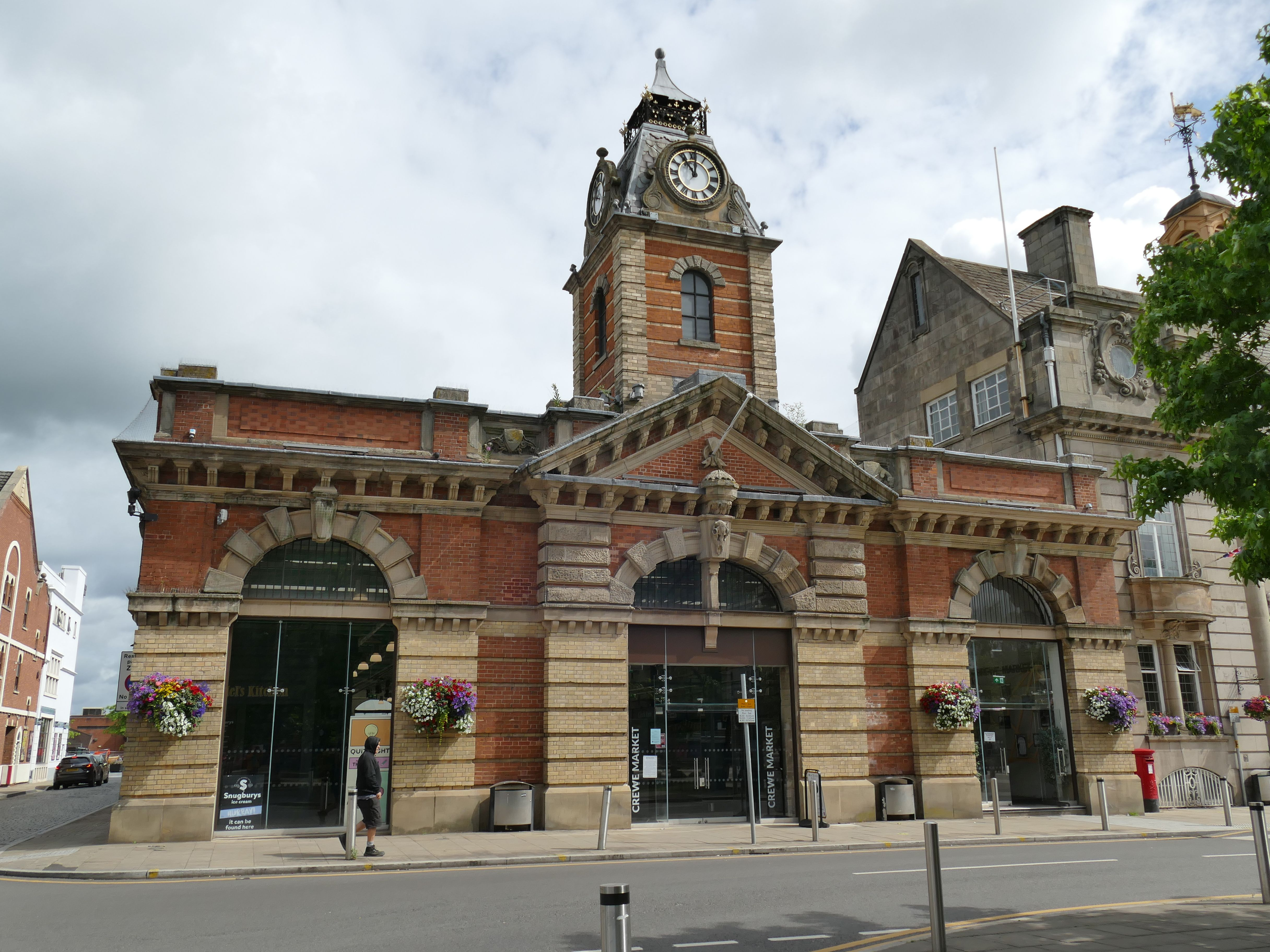
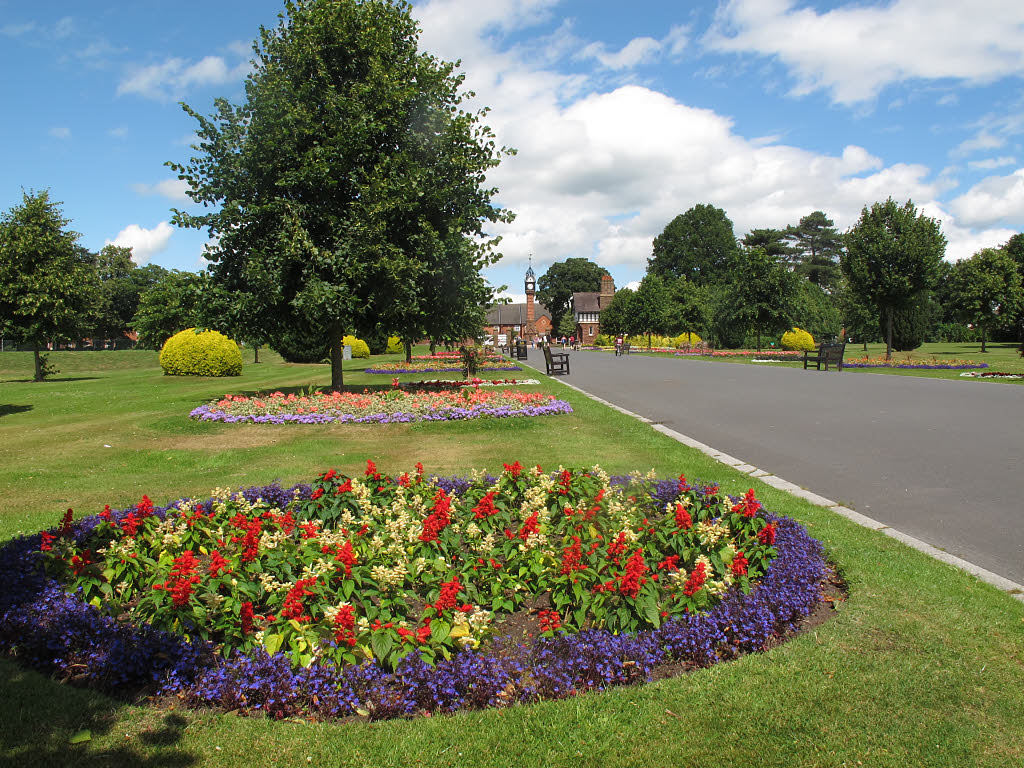
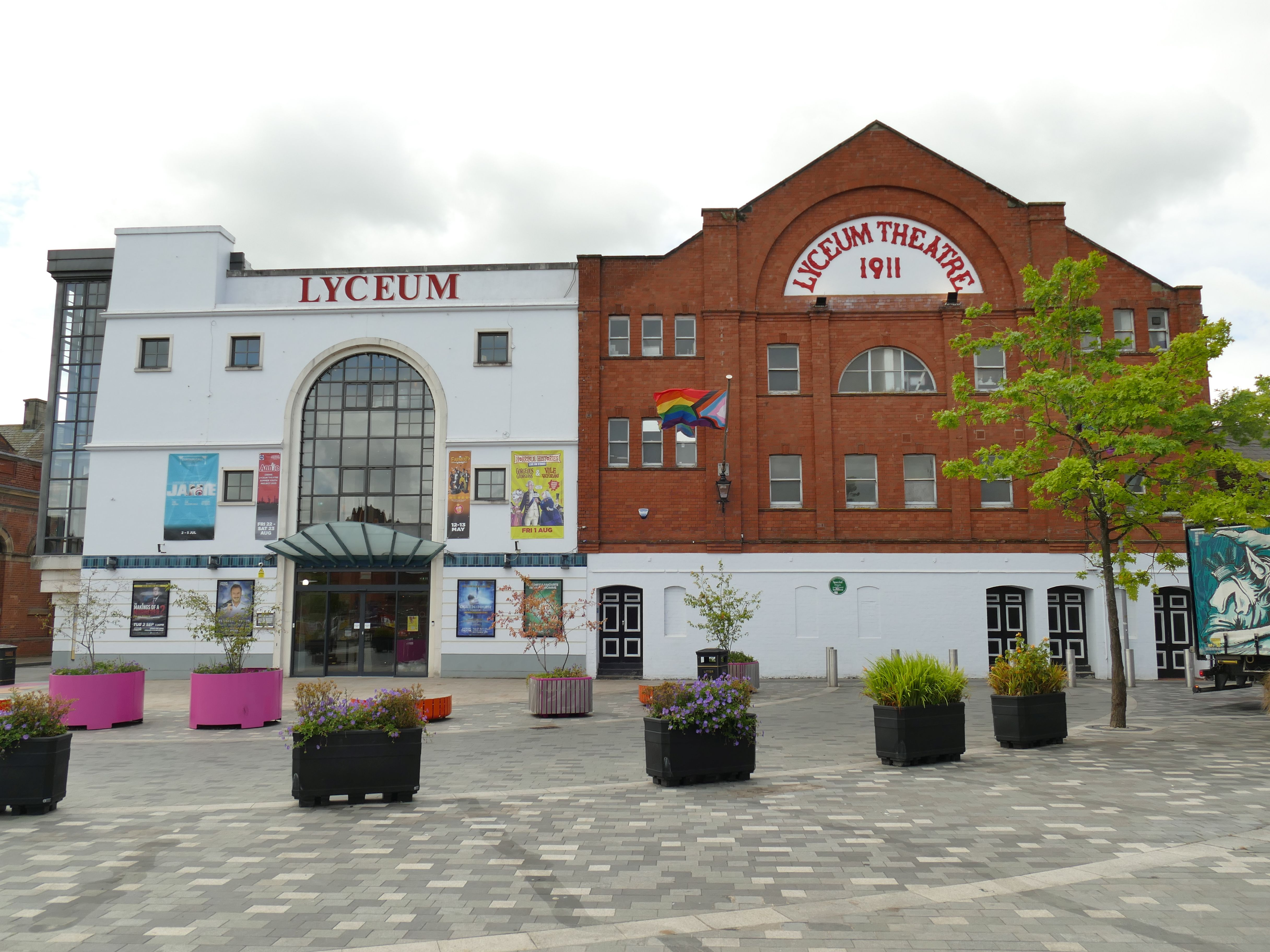
- Municipal Buildings Railway station Market Hall Queens Park Lyceum Theatre

- Location within Cheshire
- Population: 55,318 (Parish, 2021); 76,437 (Built up area, 2021)
- OS grid reference: SJ705557
  - London: 147 miles (237 km) SE
- Civil parish: Crewe
- Unitary authority: Cheshire East
- Ceremonial county: Cheshire
- Region: North West
- Country: England
- Sovereign state: United Kingdom
- Post town: CREWE
- Postcode district: CW1, CW2
- Dialling code: 01270
- Police: Cheshire
- Fire: Cheshire
- Ambulance: North West
- UK Parliament: Crewe and Nantwich
- Website: Crewe Town Council

Crewe (/kruː/) is a railway town and civil parish in the unitary authority of Cheshire East, in Cheshire, England. At the 2021 census, the parish had a population of 55,318 and the built-up area had 76,437. The town is best known as a large railway junction and home to Crewe Works; for many years, it was a major railway engineering facility for manufacturing and overhauling locomotives, but is now much reduced in size. From 1946 until 2002, it was also the home of Rolls-Royce motor car production. The Pyms Lane factory on the west of the town now exclusively produces Bentley motor cars. Crewe is 158 miles (254 km) north-west of London, 28 miles (45 km) south of Manchester city centre and 31 miles (50 km) south-east of Liverpool city centre.

== History ==
=== Medieval ===
The name derives from an Old Welsh word criu, meaning 'weir' or 'crossing'. The earliest record is in the Domesday Book, where it is written as Creu. The original settlement of Crewe lies to the east of the modern town and was historically a township in the parish of Barthomley. The original settlement formally changed its name to Crewe Green in 1984 to distinguish it from the newer town to its west.

=== Modern ===
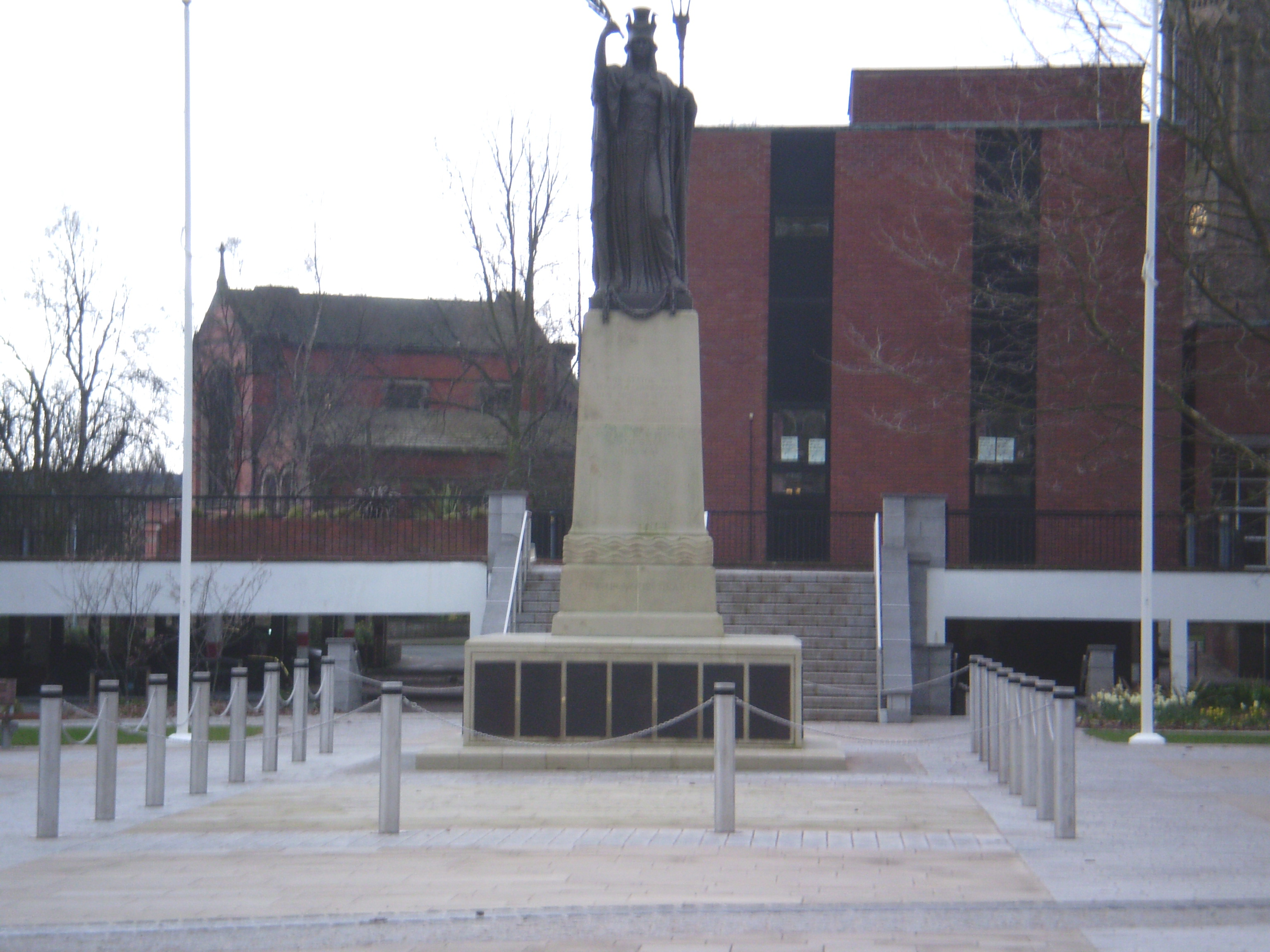
Crewe War Memorial

The town of Crewe owes its existence to Crewe railway station, which opened in 1837 on the Grand Junction Railway. When the route for the railway was being planned, alternative routes and locations for the main station in this area were considered; Winsford, seven miles (eleven kilometres) to the north, had rejected an earlier proposal, as had local landowners in neighbouring Nantwich, four miles (six kilometres) away. The company then settled on the route through Crewe and the station was built in fields near Crewe Hall. The station was in the township of Crewe, but the land north-west of the station was in the neighbouring township of Monks Coppenhall, which formed part of the parish of Coppenhall.

The company built its main locomotive works to the north of Crewe railway station; a railway colony soon started developing in the area north-west of the station. In 1840, Joseph Locke, chief engineer of the Grand Junction Railway, produced plans for a new town there. The railway company built much of the early town itself in the 1840s and 1850s. Although the nascent town was in the township of Monks Coppenhall rather than the Crewe township, it was known as Crewe from the start. The modern town of Crewe was thus named after the railway station, rather than the other way round.

The population expanded rapidly to reach 40,000 by 1871. The town has a large park, Queen's Park, laid out by engineer Francis Webb; the land for which was donated by the London and North Western Railway (LNWR), the successor to the GJR. It has been suggested that their motivation was to prevent the rival Great Western Railway building a station on the site, but the available evidence indicates otherwise.

Webb took a great interest in local politics and was "the most influential individual in the town." "Described just before his retirement as 'the King of Crewe', Webb came to exercise control over the working lives of over 18,000 men - one third of the total LNWR workforce. Over half these lived in Crewe, with around 8,000 being employed at the locomotive works. Several recreational and sporting organisations were a direct result of Webb's influence and others received benefit from his support." These included the LNWR Cricket Club (established in 1850) and the Crewe Alexandra Athletic Club (established in 1867). However, Webb's influence allegedly also extended to intimidation of Liberal Party supporters. In September 1885, the editor of the Crewe Chronicle published charges against Webb, saying "That through the action, direct and indirect, of Tory railway officialism, the political life of Crewe is cramped and hindered beyond recognition". In November 1889, the borough council debated a motion which accused LNWR managers of working with Crewe Tories "to crush Liberalism altogether out of the town": "...by intimidation and persecution of your Liberal workmen, and by making the chances of promotion depend upon subserviency to the Tory political demands of the Management, they have created a state of political serfdom in the works." In December 1889, Liberal statesman William Ewart Gladstone wrote a letter to the Chronicle condemning the company's behaviour in the town.

The railway provided an endowment towards the building and upkeep of Christ Church. Until 1897, its vicar, non-conformist ministers and schoolteachers received concessionary passes; the school having been established in 1842. The company provided a doctor's surgery with a scheme of health insurance. A gasworks was built and the works water supply was adapted to provide drinking water and a public baths. The railway also opened a cheese market in 1854 and a clothing factory for John Compton, who provided the company uniforms, while McCorquodale of Liverpool set up a printing works.

During World War II, the strategic presence of the railways and Rolls-Royce engineering works (turned over to producing aircraft engines) made Crewe a target for enemy air raids and it was in the flight path to Liverpool. The borough lost 35 civilians to these. The worst raid was on 29 August 1940 when some 50 houses were destroyed, close to the station.

The town unsuccessfully bid for city status, as part of the Platinum Jubilee Civic Honours in 2022.

== Governance ==
There are two tiers of local government covering Crewe, at civil parish (town) and unitary authority level: Crewe Town Council and Cheshire East Council. The town council is based at 1 Chantry Court on Forge Street. Cheshire East Council also has its main offices in the town, at Delamere House on Delamere Street, with the Municipal Buildings on Earle Street being used for some council meetings. Some outer parts of the built-up area (as defined by the Office for National Statistics) lie outside the parish, notably in the neighbouring parishes of Leighton, Woolstanwood, Wistaston and Rope.

For national elections, the town forms part of the Crewe and Nantwich constituency.

=== Administrative history ===
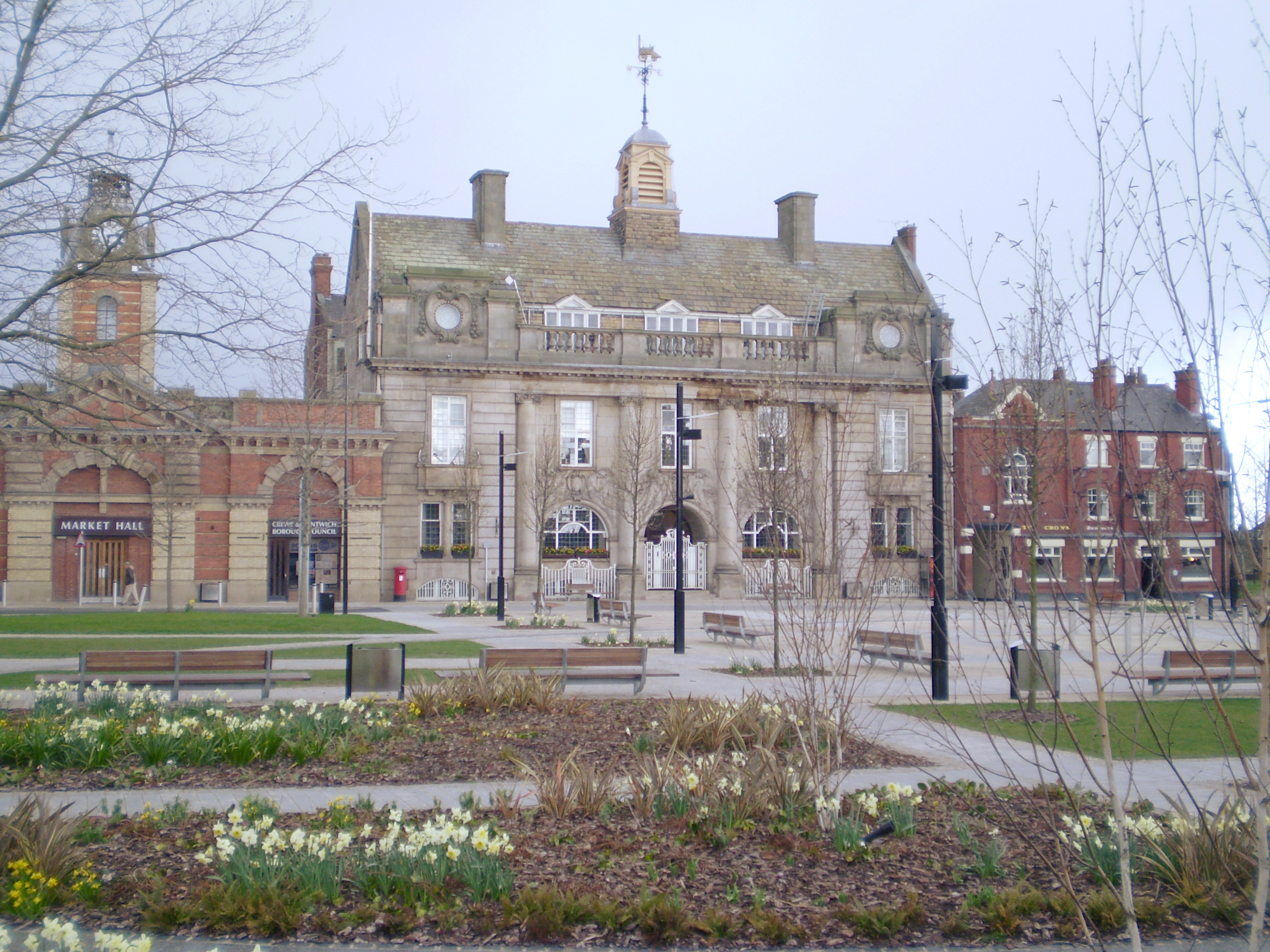
Crewe Municipal Buildings, completed 1905

The original settlement of Crewe was historically a township in the parish of Barthomley. The area where the modern town developed was in the neighbouring township of Monks Coppenhall, in the parish of Coppenhall. Both Barthomley and Coppenhall parishes formed part of the Nantwich hundred of Cheshire.

In 1859, the township of Monks Coppenhall was made a local government district, administered by an elected local board. The district's name was changed from Monks Coppenhall to Crewe in 1869. Townships were redefined as civil parishes in 1866 and, whilst the local government district was renamed in 1869, the civil parish was not; as such, there was a Crewe district which contained the parish of Monks Coppenhall, but did not contain the parish of Crewe. An old, local riddle describes the somewhat unusual states of affairs: "The place which is Crewe is not Crewe, and the place which is not Crewe is Crewe."

In 1877, the Crewe local government district was incorporated to become a municipal borough. The borough council later built the Municipal Buildings on Earle Street to serve as its headquarters, opening in 1905.

The railway station remained part of the neighbouring parish of Crewe, rather than the borough of Crewe, until 1936. The borough boundary was significantly enlarged in 1936 to absorb the parish of Church Coppenhall and parts of several other neighbouring parishes, including the area of Crewe parish around the railway station. The reduced Crewe parish to the east of the town formally changed its name to Crewe Green in 1984.

The borough of Crewe was abolished in 1974, under the Local Government Act 1972. The area became part of the larger borough of Crewe and Nantwich, also covering the nearby town of Nantwich and surrounding rural areas. The government originally proposed calling the new borough Crewe, but the shadow authority elected in 1973 to oversee the transition changed the name to Crewe and Nantwich before the new arrangements came into effect.

In 2009, Cheshire East Council was created, taking over the functions of Crewe & Nantwich Borough Council and Cheshire County Council, which were both abolished. The area of the former borough of Crewe had been unparished since the 1974 reforms but, following the 2009 reforms, it was decided to create a parish covering the area. A new parish of Crewe was therefore created in 2013, with its parish council taking the name Crewe Town Council.

== Climate ==
Like most of the United Kingdom, Crewe has an oceanic climate, with warm summers, cool winters and relatively little temperature change throughout the year.

== Economy ==
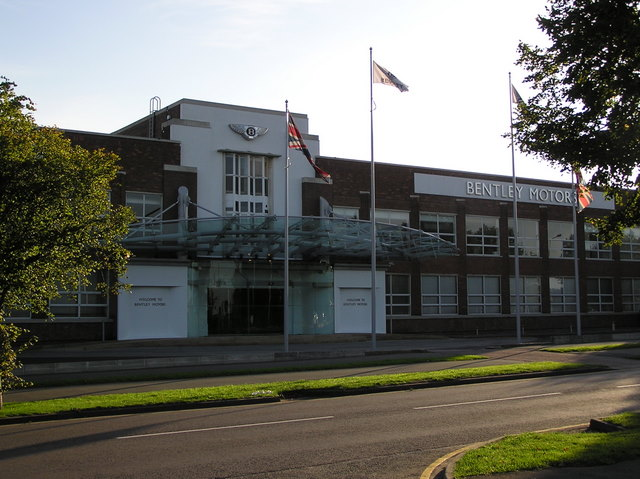
Bentley's Pyms Lane factory

The railways still play a part in local industry at Crewe Works, which carries out train maintenance and inspection. It has been owned by Alstom since 2021. At its height, the site employed over 20,000 people but, by 2005, fewer than 1,000 remained, with a further 270 redundancies announced in November of that year. Currently Alstom employs 6,000 people across the UK and Ireland. Much of the site once occupied by the works has been sold; it is now occupied by a supermarket, leisure park and a large health centre.

Crewe Electric TMD, an electric locomotive traction maintenance depot, lies to the north of the railway station; it is operated by DB Cargo UK. Crewe Diesel TMD, the former diesel locomotive depot closed in 2003; it was reopened in 2015 as a maintenance facility for Locomotive Services Limited, having undergone major structural repairs.

The Bentley Crewe car factory is on Pyms Lane, to the west of town. As of early 2010, there were about 3,500 employees working at the site. The factory used to produce Rolls-Royce cars, until the licence for the brand transferred from Bentley's owners Volkswagen to rival BMW in 2003.

There is a BAE Systems Land & Armaments factory in the village of Radway Green, near Alsager, producing small arms ammunition for the British armed forces.

Off-licence chain Bargain Booze is also Crewe-based; it was bought-out in 2018 by Sir Anwar Pervez' conglomerate Bestway for £7m, putting drinks retailing alongside its Manchester-based Well Pharmacy.

The headquarters of Focus DIY, which went into administration in 2011, was located in the town.

Several business parks around the town host light industry and offices. Crewe Business Park is a 67-acre site with offices, research and IT manufacturing. Major corporations with a presence in the park include Air Products, Barclays and Fujitsu. The 12-acre Crewe Gates Industrial Estate is adjacent to the business park, with smaller industry including the ice cream van manufacturer Whitby Morrison. The Weston Gate area has light industry and distribution. Marshfield Bank Employment Park is to the west of the town and includes offices, manufacturing and distribution. There are industrial and light industrial units at Radway Green.

The town has two small shopping centres: the Victoria Centre and the Market Centre. The latter has a few national retailers, including B&M, Poundstretcher and Peacocks. There are three large car parks nearby and Crewe bus station is a five-minute walk from the shopping centre. It has a weekly footfall of approximately 100,000 visitors.

There are outdoor markets throughout the week. Grand Junction Retail Park is just outside the centre of town. Nantwich Road provides a wide range of secondary local shops, with a variety of small retailers and estate agents.

=== Developments ===
A planned redevelopment of Crewe's town centre, including the current bus station and main shopping area, was abandoned because of "difficult economic conditions" during 2008.

There were also plans to revamp the railway station, which involved moving it to nearby Basford. This was pending a public consultation by Network Rail, scheduled for autumn 2008, but no such public consultation was done. The plan was abandoned and maintenance work was carried out on the current station instead.

Cheshire East Council developed a new regeneration master plan for Crewe, which included the opening of a new Lifestyle Centre, with a new swimming pool, gym and library.

After a £3 million refurbishment, the Crewe Market Hall reopened its doors on 19 May 2021, the start of many new developments in Crewe.

Crewe had been planned as the site of a transport hub for the Phase 2a High Speed 2 (HS2) railway line, which received royal assent in 2021 with an estimated planned completion in 2027. The plan included a new HS2 railway station, surrounded by a commercial hub providing 37,000 jobs and 7,000 homes by 2043. However, on 4 October 2023, prime minister Rishi Sunak announced the cancellation of this phase of the HS2 development at the Conservative Party Conference.

== Transport ==
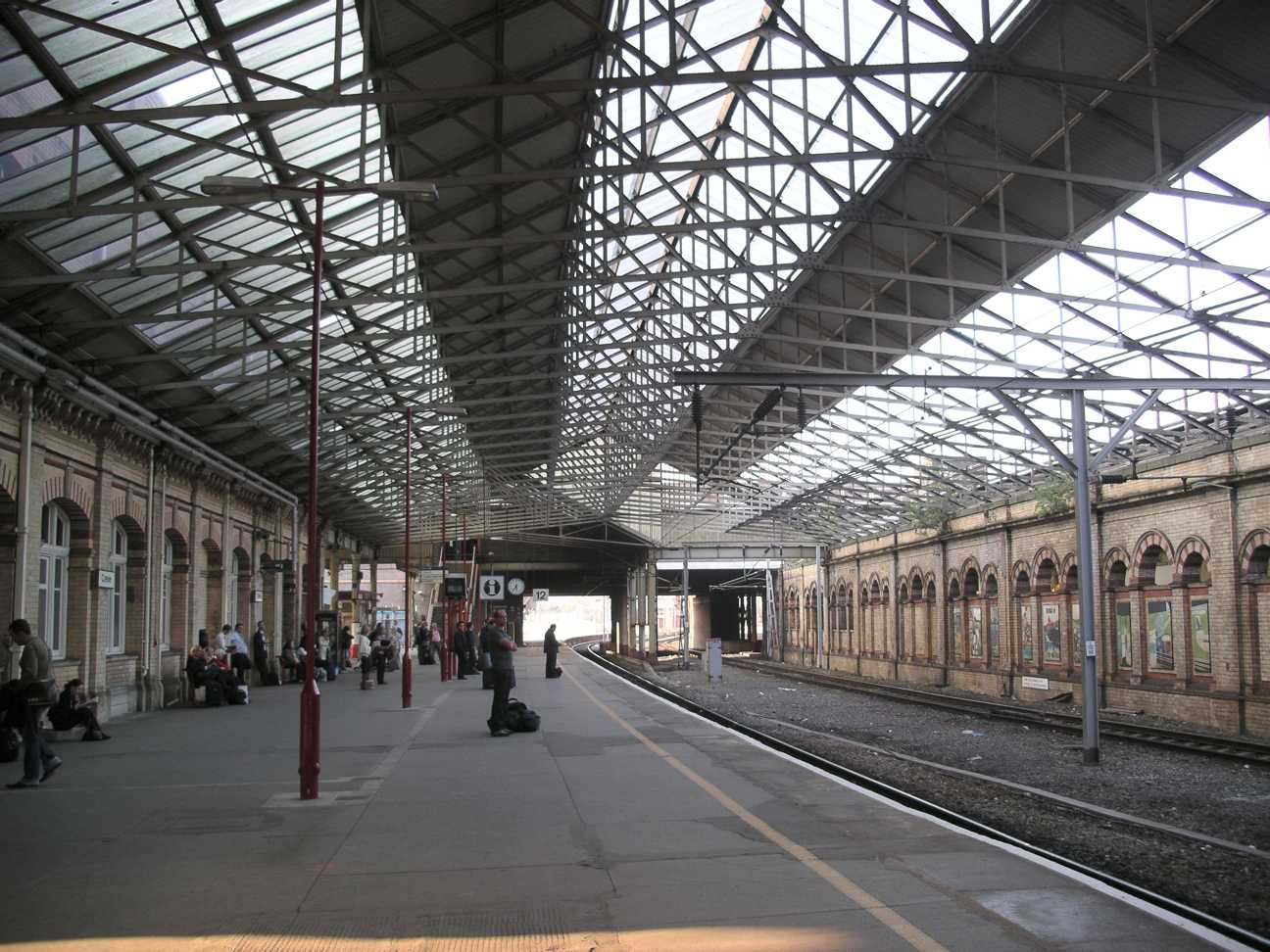
Platform 12 at Crewe railway station, before the roof over it was replaced

=== Railway ===
Crewe railway station is located less than one mile (1.5 kilometres) from the town centre, although it was not incorporated into the then Borough of Crewe until 1937. It is one of the largest stations in the North West and is a major interchange station on the West Coast Main Line. It has 12 platforms in use.

The station is served by six train operating companies:

- Avanti West Coast operates inter-city trains to London Euston (average journey time of around 1 hour 35 minutes), Glasgow Central, Edinburgh Waverley, Manchester Piccadilly, Liverpool Lime Street and Holyhead for the ferry connections to Dublin Port
- East Midlands Railway runs trains to Newark Castle, Derby and Nottingham
- Lumo Trains West Coast operating trains between London Euston and Stirling in Scotland
- London Northwestern Railway operates three routes: between Birmingham New Street and Liverpool Lime Street; to Stoke-on-Trent and Stafford; and to London Euston
- Northern Trains operates stopping services on two routes to Manchester Piccadilly: via Stockport and via Manchester Airport on the Styal Line
- Transport for Wales provide services to Cardiff Central, Chester, Wrexham General and Manchester Piccadilly.

=== Buses ===
Bus services in Crewe are operated predominantly by D&G Bus; their routes link the town with Congleton , Leighton Hospital , Macclesfield, Nantwich and Northwich.

Stagecoach Merseyside & South Lancashire operates a service Chester and First Potteries operates a service to Stoke-on-Trent, via Kidsgrove.

=== Roads ===
Crewe lies on the A500, A530 and A534 roads; it is located less than 5 miles (8 km) from the M6 motorway.

=== Airports ===
The closest airport is Manchester Airport, which is 30 miles (48 km) away; Liverpool John Lennon Airport is 40 miles (64 km) away.

== Education ==
Cheshire has adopted the comprehensive school model of secondary education, so all of the schools under its control cater for pupils of all levels of ability. Until the late 1970s, Crewe had two grammar schools, Crewe Grammar School for Boys, now Ruskin High School, and Crewe Grammar School for Girls, now the Oaks Academy (formerly Kings Grove School). The town's two other secondary schools are Sir William Stanier School, a specialist technology and arts academy, and St. Thomas More Catholic High School, specialising in mathematics and computing and modern foreign languages.

Although there are eight schools for those aged 11–16 in Crewe and its surrounding area, Cheshire College South & West is one of only two local providers of education for pupils aged 16 and over, and the only one in Crewe. The college also provides educational programmes for adults, leading to qualifications such as Higher National Diplomas (HNDs) or foundation degrees. In the 2006–07 academic year, 2,532 students aged 16–18 were enrolled, along with 3,721 adults.

Manchester Metropolitan University's (MMU) Cheshire faculty is based in Crewe, in a part of town which has been rebranded as the University Quadrant. The campus offers undergraduate and postgraduate courses in five areas: business and management, contemporary arts, exercise and sport science, interdisciplinary studies, education and teacher training. The campus underwent a £70 million investment in its facilities and buildings in 2015. The campus was used as a pre-games training camp for the London 2012 Olympic Games.

Since 2016, there has been a University Technical College for 14–19-year-olds interested in automotive or railway engineering.

== Religion ==
Crewe has six Anglican churches, three Methodist, one Roman Catholic (which has a weekly Mass in Polish) and two Baptist. Among new religious movements, the Ahmadi Religion of Peace and Light is headquartered at Webb House.

== Culture ==
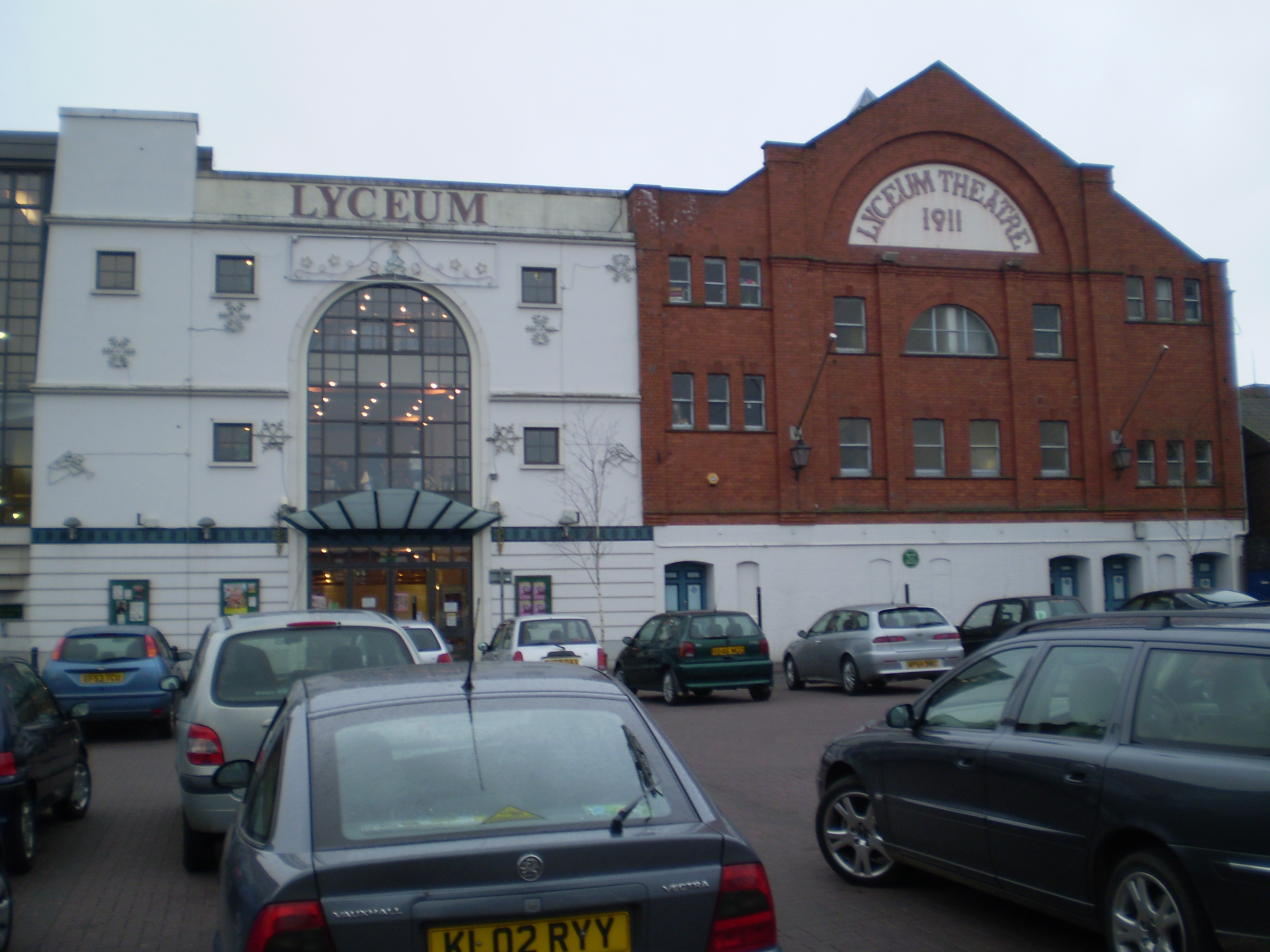
Lyceum Theatre

Crewe Heritage Centre is located on the site of the old locomotive works. The museum has three signal boxes and an extensive miniature railway, with many steam, diesel and electric traction exhibits. The most prominent exhibits are the Class 370 Advanced Passenger Train and two HST power cars.

The Grade II-listed Edwardian Lyceum Theatre is in the centre of Crewe. It was built in 1911 and shows drama, ballet, opera, music, comedy and pantomime. The theatre was originally located on Heath Street from 1882. The Axis Arts Centre is on the Manchester Metropolitan University (MMU) campus in Crewe; it relocated from the university's Alsager Campus when it closed. The centre has a programme of touring new performance and visual art work. The Axis centre closed at the end of the spring 2019 season, with the withdrawal of MMU from the Crewe campus. The Box on Pedley Street is the town's main local music venue.

Both the Lyceum Theatre and the Axis Arts Centre feature galleries; the private Livingroom art gallery is on Prince Albert Street. The town's main library is on Prince Albert Square, opposite the Municipal Buildings.

There is a museum dedicated to Primitive Methodism in the nearby village of Englesea-Brook.

The Jacobean mansion Crewe Hall is located to the east of the town near Crewe Green. It is a grade I listed building, built in 1615–1636 for Sir Randolph Crewe. If is now used as a hotel, restaurant and health club.

There is a multiplex Odeon cinema on Phoenix Leisure Park, on the edge of the town centre, as well as a Mecca bingo hall and a tenpin bowling alley.

Queens Park is the town's main park; £6.5 million was spent on its restoration in 2010. It features walkways, a children's play area, crown green bowling, putting, a boating lake, grassed areas, memorials and a café. Jubilee Gardens are in Hightown and there is also a park on Westminster Street.

In 2019, Crewe hosted Pride in the Park in Queens Park. The 2020 event, which had been due to take place on 12 September, was cancelled on 20 May due to the COVID-19 pandemic.

== Media ==
Local news and television programmes are provided by BBC North West and ITV Granada.

As of 2026, the independent and online-only Crewe Nub News is the town's largest media outlet, with over 50,000 weekly readers.

The daily Sentinel and the weekly Crewe Chronicle newspapers, both Reach plc-owned, cover the town. Reach's CheshireLive is the digital news channel of the Crewe Chronicle and other Reach titles covering news across Cheshire, and has a section dedicated to Crewe news.

Radio stations that cover the area include BBC Radio Stoke, Hits Radio Staffordshire and Cheshire and Greatest Hits Radio Staffordshire & Cheshire (formerly Signal 1 and Signal 2 respectively) and Silk Radio from Macclesfield, Blue Sky Radio, and local community radio station The Cat Community Radio, broadcasting from the Cheshire College South and West building covering the town along with Nantwich and other local settlements.

== Sport ==
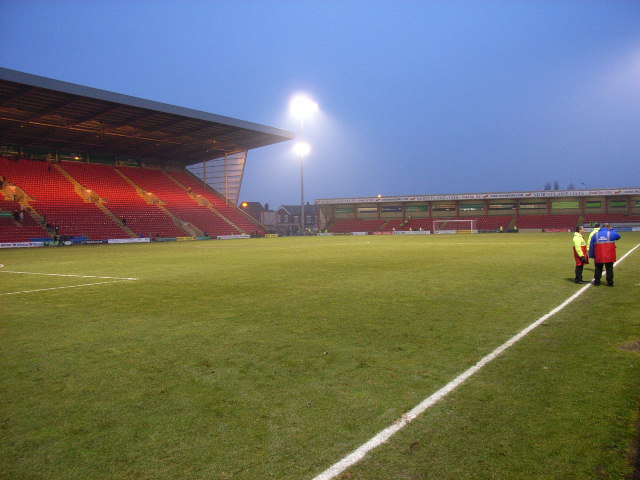
Gresty Road stadium, the home of Crewe Alexandra

Crewe's local football club is Crewe Alexandra, founded in 1877 and initially managed by railway workers. During the late 20th century, the club enjoyed something of a renaissance under the management of Dario Gradi, playing in the second tier of the professional pyramid for eight seasons in the late 1990s and early 2000s. Crewe Alexandra currently plays in League Two (the fourth tier), having been relegated from League One in April 2022. In 2013, the club won its first major silverware after beating Southend United 2–0 in the EFL Trophy final at Wembley.

From the early 1980s, Crewe Alexandra built a reputation for developing young players through its youth ranks: England internationals Geoff Thomas, Danny Murphy, David Platt, Rob Jones and Dean Ashton, plus Northern Ireland's Neil Lennon and Steve Jones, and Wales' Robbie Savage and David Vaughan all passed through the club. Among their earlier most notable home-grown players was Frank Blunstone, born in the town in 1934, who was transferred from The Alex to Chelsea in 1953 and went on to win five England caps. Internationals Bruce Grobbelaar and Stan Bowles were also on the books at one time in their careers.

Crewe's local rugby clubs are both based in or near Nantwich. The Crewe & Nantwich Steamers (formerly Crewe Wolves), who played in the Rugby League Conference, were based at Barony Park, Nantwich, while Crewe and Nantwich RUFC play their home games at the Vagrants Sports Ground in Willaston.

Speedway racing was staged in Crewe in the pioneer days of the late 1920s to early 1930s; the stadium in Earle Street also operated from 1969 until 1975 when the Crewe Kings raced in British League Division Two, then the National League. At the time the track was the longest and fastest in the UK. Crewe Kings riders included Phil Crump (father of Jason Crump), Les Collins (brother of Peter Collins), Dave Morton (brother of Chris Morton), Geoff Curtis, John Jackson, Jack Millen and Dave Parry. Grand Junction Retail Park occupies the site of the now demolished stadium.

The Crewe Railroaders are the town's American football team, currently competing in the BAFA Central League Division 2 and the subject of the film Gridiron UK, which premiered at the Lyceum Theatre on 29 September 2016.

Crewe also has its own roller derby team, Railtown Loco Rollers, founded in September 2013. They skate at Sir William Stanier Leisure Centre and compete with skaters and teams from all over the North West.

The town's main leisure facility is the Crewe Lifestyle Centre, which now houses the main public swimming pool after the Flag Lane premises closed in 2016. Other notable leisure facilities include Sir William Stanier Leisure Centre and Victoria Community Centre.

Since 17 February 2018, Crewe's Queens Park hosts a parkrun every Saturday morning at 9am.

== In popular culture ==
Crewe crater on Mars is named after the town.

Crewe was described by author Alan Garner in his novel Red Shift as "the ultimate reality."

In 1984, Crewe was mentioned as the setting of the 19th episode The Flying Kipper, in the first series of Thomas & Friends.

=== In literature ===
A limerick referencing Crewe appears in Roald Dahl's novel, Matilda (1988), when Matilda reads aloud from a collection of humorous verse:

An epicure, dining at Crewe
Found quite a large mouse in his stew.
Cried the waiter, "Don't shout,
And wave it about,
Or the rest will be wanting one, too!"

The limerick predates Matilda and appears without attribution in several earlier publications, including The Swiss Monthly (April 1924), The Outlook (February 1925), and The Comic Muse: An Anthology of Humorous Verse, compiled by J.C. Squire (1925).

== Notable people ==
=== Politicians ===
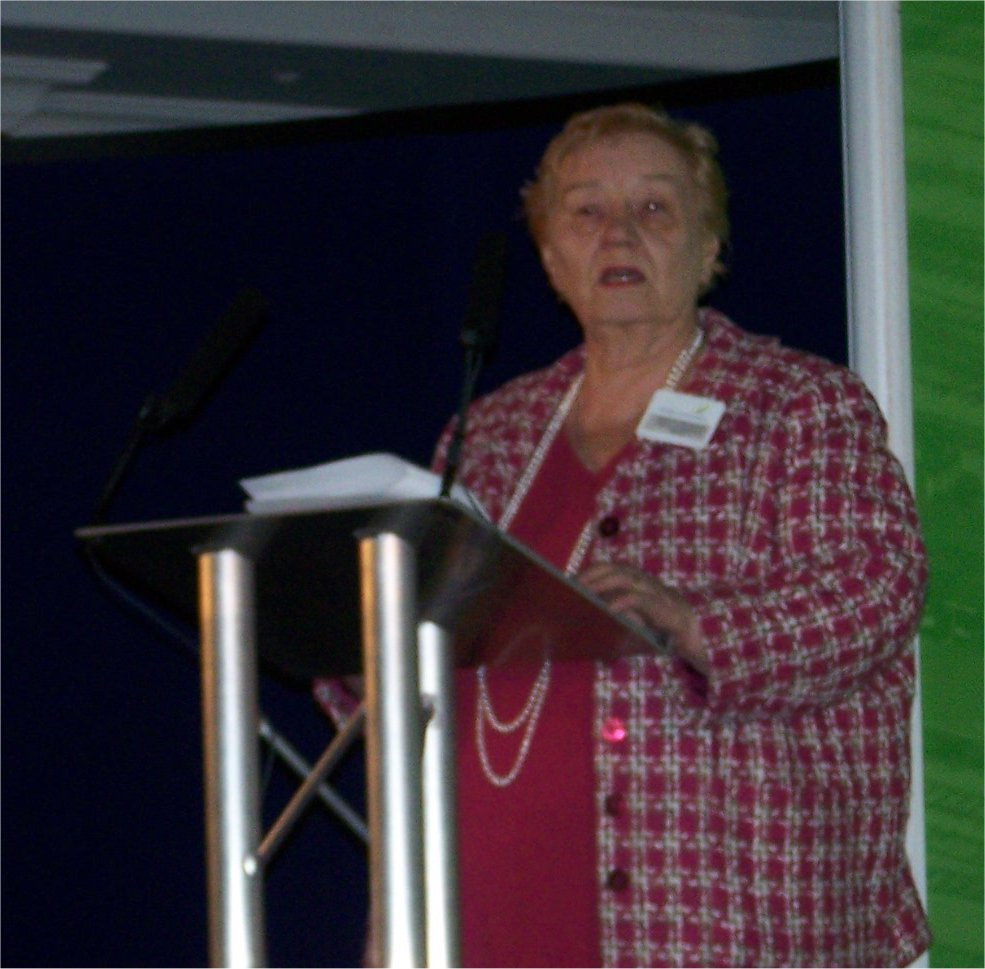
Gwyneth Dunwoody, 2008

- Thomas Nevitt (1864 in Crewe-1932), member of the Queensland Legislative Council
- William Wheeldon (1898 in Crewe–1960), co-operator and local politician from Birmingham and MP
- Gwyneth Dunwoody (1930–2008), Labour Party politician, MP for Exeter from 1966 to 1970, then for Crewe, then Crewe and Nantwich from 1974 to 2008
- Janet Dean (born 1949 in Crewe), Labour Party MP for Burton from 1997 to 2010
- Tom Levitt (born 1954 in Crewe), Labour Party politician who was the MP for High Peak
- Kali Mountford (born 1954 in Crewe), Labour Party politician and MP for Colne Valley
- Edward Timpson (born 1973), Conservative MP for Crewe and Nantwich (2008–2017) and Eddisbury (2019–2024)
- Paul Maynard (born 1975 in Crewe), Conservative MP for Blackpool North and Cleveleys and Rail Minister
- Lauren Moss (born 1987 in Crewe), Australian politician.

=== Public service and commerce ===
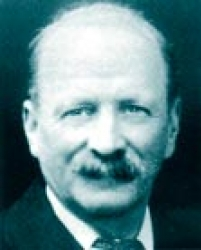
William Hope, 1863

- Francis Webb (1836 – 1906) railway engineer who, as LNWR's chief mechanical engineer, also exercised great influence in political and public life in the town; once described as the 'King of Crewe'
- William Hope (1863 – 1933), based in Crewe, pioneer of spirit photography, member of the Crewe Circle
- Ada Nield Chew, (1870 – 1945), suffragist, wrote a series of letters to the Crewe Chronicle, signed "A Crewe Factory Girl"
- Wilfrid Oulton, (1911–1997), RAF Air Vice-Marshal; dealt with British nuclear tests in the Pacific Ocean
- Blaster Bates a.k.a. Derek Macintosh Bates (1923 in Crewe – 2006), an English explosives and demolition expert and raconteur
- Harold Hankins (1930 in Crewe–2009), electrical engineer and the first vice-chancellor of UMIST
- Professor Christine Dean (born in Crewe 1939), London psychiatrist, attended Crewe County Grammar School
- Chris Hughes (1947–2025), one of Britain's top quizzers, featuring in Eggheads. Lived in Crewe
- Mark Price, Baron Price (born 1961 in Crewe), businessman, former managing director of Waitrose and deputy chairman of the John Lewis Partnership.

=== Arts ===
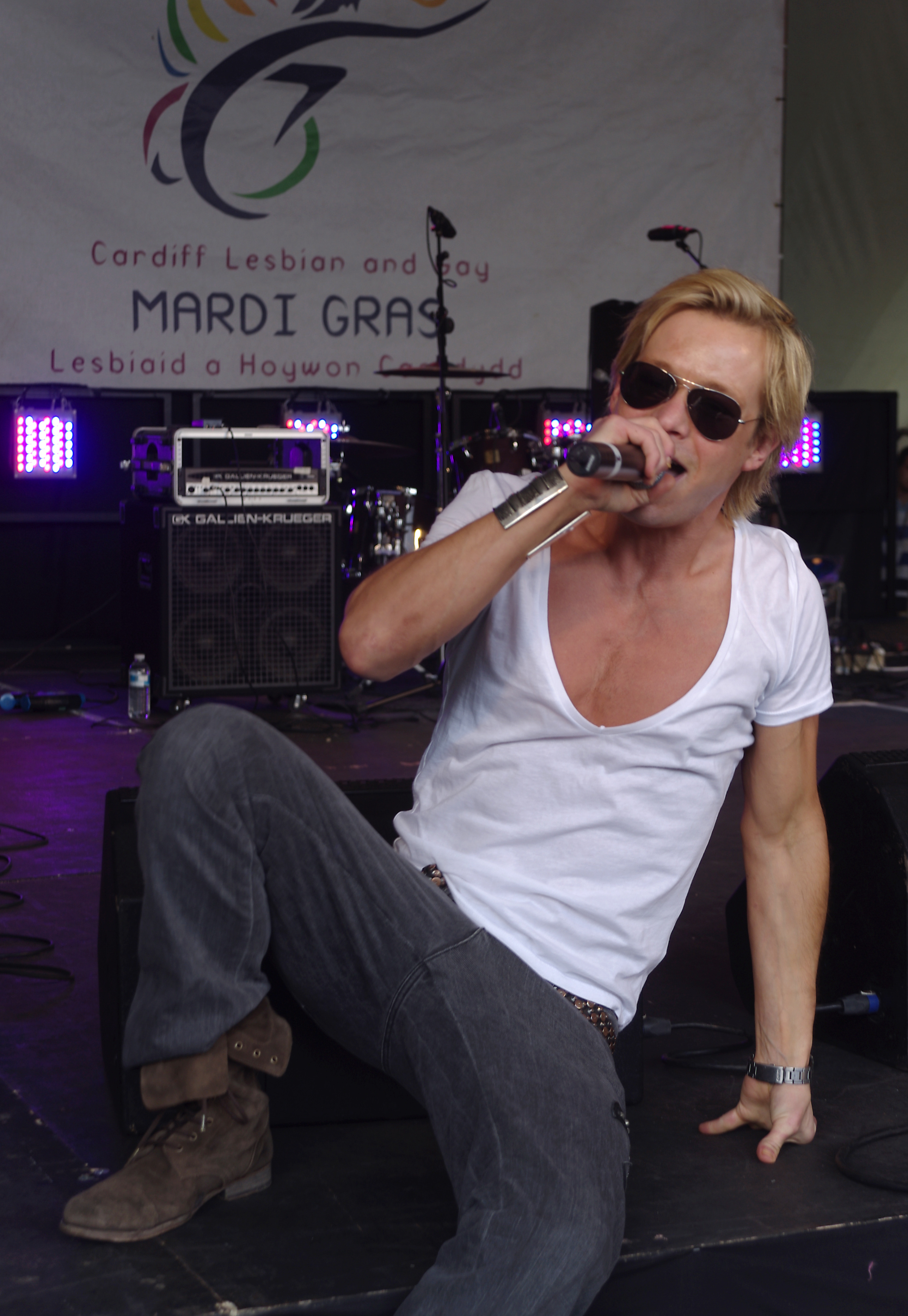
Adam Rickitt, 2010

- William Cooper (real name Harry Summerfield Hoff) (1910 – 2002), novelist, lived at 99 Brooklyn Street
- John Mark Ainsley (born 1963 in Crewe), English lyric tenor of baroque music and the works of Mozart
- Carl Ashmore (born 1968), children's author
- Any Trouble, a British rock band, originating from Crewe in 1975, best known for their early 1980s recordings
- Carey Willetts (born 1976 in Crewe), musician, songwriter and producer
- Lee Oakes (born 1976), actor, from Haslington near Crewe
- Mackenzie Taylor (1978–2010), comic, writer and director. Born in Crewe
- Adam Rickitt (born 1978), actor, singer, model and charity fundraiser.

=== Sport ===
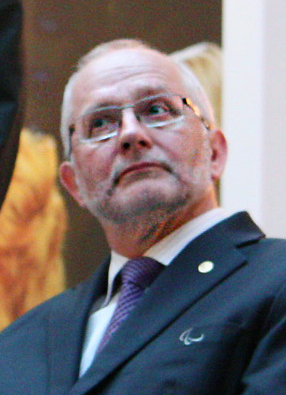
Philip Craven, 2012

- John Warburton (1903–?), football player, mostly for Wrexham and Crewe Alexandra.
- Frank Blunstone (born 1934 in Crewe), footballer who played for Crewe Alexandra, Chelsea and England.
- Sir Philip Craven (born 1950), president of the International Paralympic Committee (IPC) 2001–2017, lives in Shavington.
- Neil Brooks (born in Crewe 1962), Australian Olympic swimming gold medallist
- John Edward Morris (born 1964), former English cricketer, played most for Derbyshire
- David Gilford (born 1965), European Tour and Ryder Cup golfer (1991, 1995) is from Crewe
- Mark Rivers (born 1975 in Crewe), footballer who played as a forward for Crewe Alexandra and Norwich City
- Kevin Street (born 1977 in Crewe), footballer who played for Crewe Alexandra and Shrewsbury Town
- Neil Critchley (born 1978 in Crewe), a former Crewe Alexandra footballer and most recently head coach at Heart of Midlothian.
- Mark Cueto (born 1979), former rugby union international and player for the Sale Sharks
- Craig Jones (1985 in Crewe – 2008), English motorcycle racer who grew up in Northwich
- Shanaze Reade (born 1988), world BMX and track cycling champion
- Muthu Alagappan (born c. 1990 in Crewe), medical student, known in the US for his basketball analytics
- Bryony Page (born 1990 in Crewe), an Olympic gold medal-winning trampolinist, raised in the village of Wrenbury, 8 1/2 mi (13.5 km) from the town

== Twin towns ==
Crewe is twinned with:

- Bischofsheim, near Mainz, Germany
- Dzierżoniów, Poland (since 2005).

== See also ==
- Listed buildings in Crewe
