= St Thomas More Catholic School, Crewe =

St Thomas More Catholic High School

Location
- Dane Bank Avenue; Crewe, Cheshire, CW2 8AE; England; 53°05′15″N 2°27′38″W

Information
- Type: Academy
- Religious affiliation: Roman Catholic
- Department for Education URN: 139764 Tables
- Ofsted: Reports
- Chair of Governors: Jon Fisher
- Headteacher: Katherine Packham
- Gender: Mixed
- Age: 11 to 16
- Enrolment: 700
- Houses: Romero; Kolbe; Ozanam; Mother Theresa; Bernadette
- Colours: Navy , White
- Website: http://www.st-thomasmore.cheshire.sch.uk/
- Last updated: 17/09/2023

St Thomas More Catholic High School is a coeducational Roman Catholic secondary school for 11- to 16-year-olds, situated close to the centre of Crewe, in Cheshire, England. There are nearly 700 pupils on the roll at the current time. The school's headteacher is Katherine Packham, who gained this position in September 2023.

== History of the school ==
The school was one of 62 schools to gain specialist school status in Mathematics and Information Communication Technologies in September 2006. This was added to in March 2009 with the achievement of specialist school status in Modern Foreign Languages.

The school converted to academy status in June 2013.

In September 2023 Katherine Packham was appointed headteacher.

== Images of the School ==
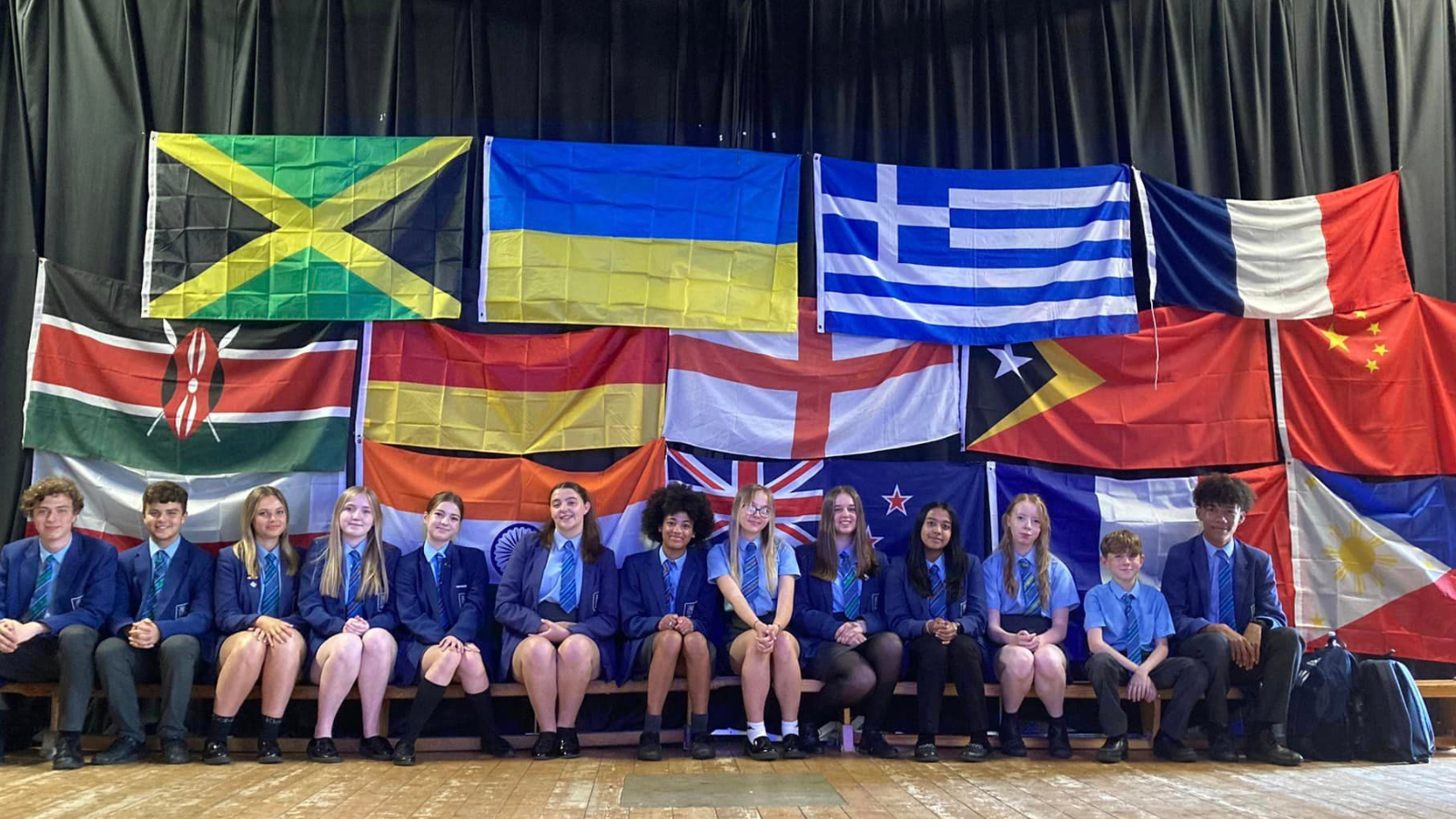
St Thomas More International Evening 2023

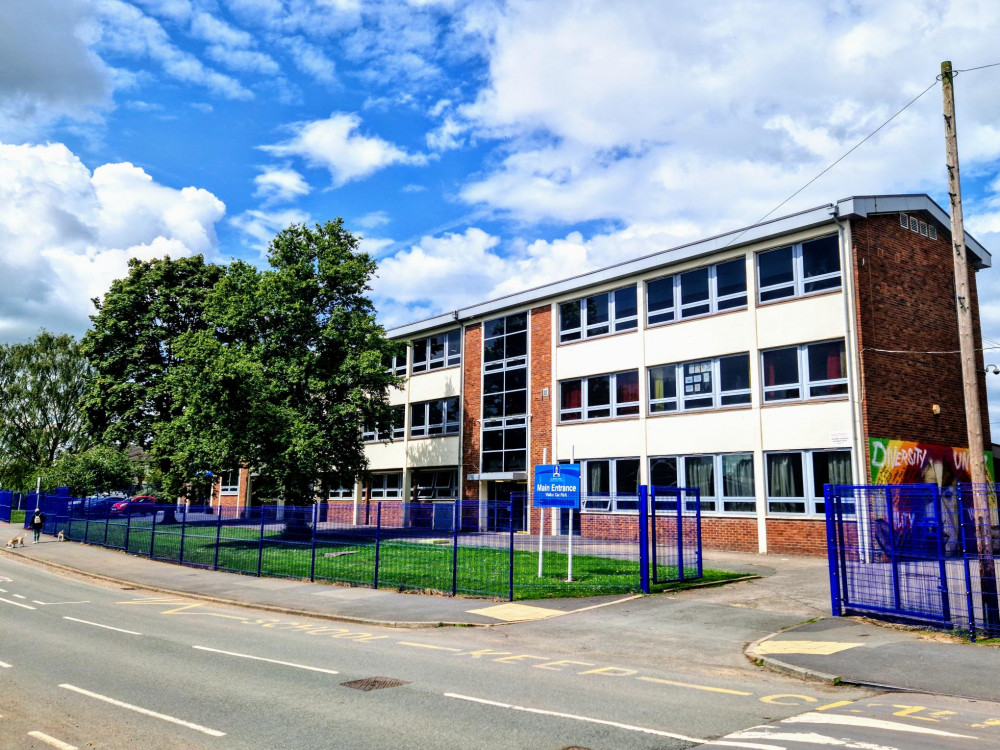
Saint Thomas More Catholic High School

== Notable former pupils ==
- Mark Cueto, international rugby union player
- Harry Davis, footballer
- Joe Davis, footballer
- Rob Hulse, footballer
- Steve Leonard, veterinarian and television personality
- Junior Brown (footballer), footballer
- Matúš Holíček, professional footballer currently playing for local League 2 club Crewe Alexandra, and Slovakia U18
