= Carl Ashmore =

English children's author

- Born: Carl Stuart Ashmore; 17 August 1968 (age 58); Crewe, Cheshire, England, UK
- Occupation: Writer
- Writing career
- Period: 2006–present
- Genre: Children's novels
- Notable work: ''The Time Hunters'' series

Carl Stuart Ashmore (born 17 August 1968) is an English children's author. He is best known for his book The Time Hunters.

== Early life and education ==
Ashmore was born in the town of Crewe, Cheshire in 1968. He is a graduate of Bournemouth University, having graduated in 1990 with a degree in Communication and Media Production.

== Work ==
Before working as an author he worked for Granada Television and a lecturer in film and media at Burslem College.

Ashmore wrote his first book The Time Hunters in 2006 while spending a years sabbatical on the south coast of France. His other books include The Time Hunters and the Box of Eternity and The Time Hunters and the Spear of Fate (Books 2 and 3 in The Time Hunters series), Bernard and the Bibble and The Night They Nicked Saint Nick.

From 2013 his best-known book The Time Hunters will be published in Brazil by Brazilian publishing house Bertrand Brasil.
