= Nerve Radio =

Coordinates: 50°44′33″N 1°53′47″W

- Bournemouth; England
- Frequencies: Online and 87.9FM on two-week broadcasts every year

Programming
- Format: Music & Speech
- Affiliations: Student Radio Association

Ownership
- Owner: SUBU (Student Union Bournemouth University)

History
- First air date: 1995

Links
- Webcast: http://listen.nerve.radio/
- Website: https://www.nerve.radio/

Nerve Radio is the Student Union run radio station for Bournemouth University. It was started in 1995 by two Bournemouth University students David Harber and James Bromley in a portacabin on the University's Talbot Campus, and now operates online through its website. During each academic year, Nerve Radio broadcasts on a temporary FM licence around the Bournemouth area, usually at the end of the Spring term in March.

Nerve Radio broadcasts every day during term time. Live shows runs from 8 am until 10 pm, with music running the rest of the time under the show title "Non-Stop Nerve", making the radio station 24/7.

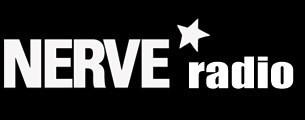
Logo used from 2011-2015

Nerve Radio is part of Nerve Media, which regularly posts news articles and online features on their website, alongside publishing the award winning Nerve Magazine.

In 2015, Nerve Radio moved into the new Student Union building on campus. Nerve now operates with two fully equipped studios, and broadcasts to the hundreds of students inside the Student Union building.

Many alumni of the station have gone on to work in the industry professionally including Rachel Jones, Drew Miller Hyndman, and Fleur Ostojak. A number have joined BFBS including Alex Gill, Elliot Darby, Jess Bracey, Sam Bailey and Jacob Dyer.

Nerve is a member of the Student Radio Association, and is part of their 'South Region'. In June 2024, they hosted the second annual 'Round The Clock Radio Challenge' for charity, featuring live contributions from across the region, as well as a special Summer edition of the Eurovision Top 250 Chart, won by Eleni Foureira's 'Fuego'.
