= John Warburton (footballer) =

English footballer

Personal information
- Full name: John Salmon Warburton
- Date of birth: 1903
- Place of birth: Crewe, Cheshire, England
- Position: Outside left

Senior career*
Years	Team	Apps	(Gls)
- Rhyl
- Bangor City
- Mold
1924	Wrexham	1	(0)
- Mold
- Macclesfield Town
- Congleton Town
1929	Crewe Alexandra	2	(0)
- * Club domestic league appearances and goals

John Salmon Warburton (born 1903; date of death unknown) was an English professional footballer who played as an outside left. He made appearances in the English Football League for Wrexham and Crewe Alexandra. He also played for Rhyl, Bangor City, Mold, Macclesfield Town and Congleton Town during his career.
