= Bournemouth University =

University in Bournemouth, Christchurch and Poole, England

- Bournemouth University coat of arms
- Motto: Discere Mutari Est (Latin)
- Motto in English: To Learn is to Change
- Type: Public
- Established: 1992
- Affiliations: EUA; University Alliance; Universities UK
- Endowment: £1.85 million (2022)
- Budget: £169.6 million (2021-22)
- Chancellor: Kate Adie
- Vice-Chancellor: Alison Honour
- Students: 16,860 (2024/25)
- Undergraduates: 12,705 (2024/25)
- Postgraduates: 4,155 (2024/25)
- Location: Poole, England; 50.743213°N 1.896901°W
- Campus: Talbot Campus Lansdowne Campus
Colours
- Website: bournemouth.ac.uk

Bournemouth University is a public university in Bournemouth, England, with its main campus situated in neighbouring Poole. The university was founded in 1992; however, the origins of its predecessor date back to the early 1900s.

The university currently has over 17,000 students, including over 3,000 international students. The university is recognised for its work in the media industries. Graduates from the university have worked on a number of Hollywood films, including Gravity, which was awarded the Achievement in Visual Effects Oscar at the 86th Academy Awards in 2015.

In 2023, Bournemouth University received a silver rating in the Teaching Excellence Framework, a government assessment of the quality of undergraduate teaching in universities and other higher education providers in England.

== History ==
=== Predecessor institutions ===
The university was first founded in the early 20th century as the predecessor Bournemouth Municipal College. The college initially offered courses to prepare students for University of London degrees (1942–1976). In the mid-1960s there were 6,850-day and evening students. As early as 1965, in the House of Commons, the number of students at the college was highlighted, and the Secretary of State was asked to consider a university application. At the time the Government did not intend to create any new universities until the late 1970s,.

In the 1970s the college became the Bournemouth College of Technology. Later that decade, following a review by the Dorset Education Committee, the College of Technology changed to become Dorset Institute of Higher Education (DIHE).

Bernard MacManus was appointed Director in 1983 and presided over a significant expansion in curriculum and student numbers, against a backdrop of initial uncertainty over the Weymouth Campus. During this time the Talbot Campus was consolidated having been established in 1976. The neighbouring Student Village was also constructed. A second campus was established at Lansdowne. The period between 1983 and 1994 saw the Institute expand into new disciplines including heritage, tourism, tax, public relations, computer animation and information systems. Two foundation stones remain within university buildings. The foundation stone for the College of Technology (1970s) resides in the main lobby of Poole House, Talbot Campus. The foundation stone for the Dorset Institute is mounted in Dorset House near what is now called The Edge. Bernard MacManus was honoured by Bournemouth University with an honorary doctorate in 2007.

=== University status ===
The expansion under Dr MacManus allowed the institute to make a strong case to become a polytechnic, which was gained in 1990. In 1992 all polytechnics were awarded university status and the institute was renamed to become Bournemouth University.

By September 1994, over 9,000 students had been recruited nationally, and internationally, to undergraduate and postgraduate degrees. By 1996 the university had 11 endowed professorial posts, including:

- Royal Mail Chair in Business Performance Improvement
- Intel Chair in Computer Supported Cooperation
- British Property Federation Chair in Archaeology and Development
- IBM Chair in Concurrent Engineering
- Intergraph Chair in Electronic Design Automation
- GPT Chair in Software Engineering
- Steele Raymond Chair in Business Law
- Hewlett-Packard Chair in Computer Animation
- Sutcliffe Chair in Catering Management
- Marks & Spencer Chair in Retail Management

In recent years the university has announced a significant investment programme, and by 2018 it plans to invest £200 million in new buildings and facilities including a new Student Centre, which opened in March 2015.

=== Coat of arms ===
The university coat of arms was granted in 1992 by the official heraldic authority for England, the College of Arms. The talbots, the heraldic beasts on the shield, represent the location of the main campus. The crowns denote the three Saxon crowns of the Kingdom of Wessex, and the nearby boroughs. The blue represents the nearby sea, reflecting the location of the university, on the Jurassic Coast of Dorset. The red dragon in the coat of arms represents Dorset, and the scroll represents learning.

The Latin motto Discere Mutari Est means To Learn is to Change.

== Campuses ==
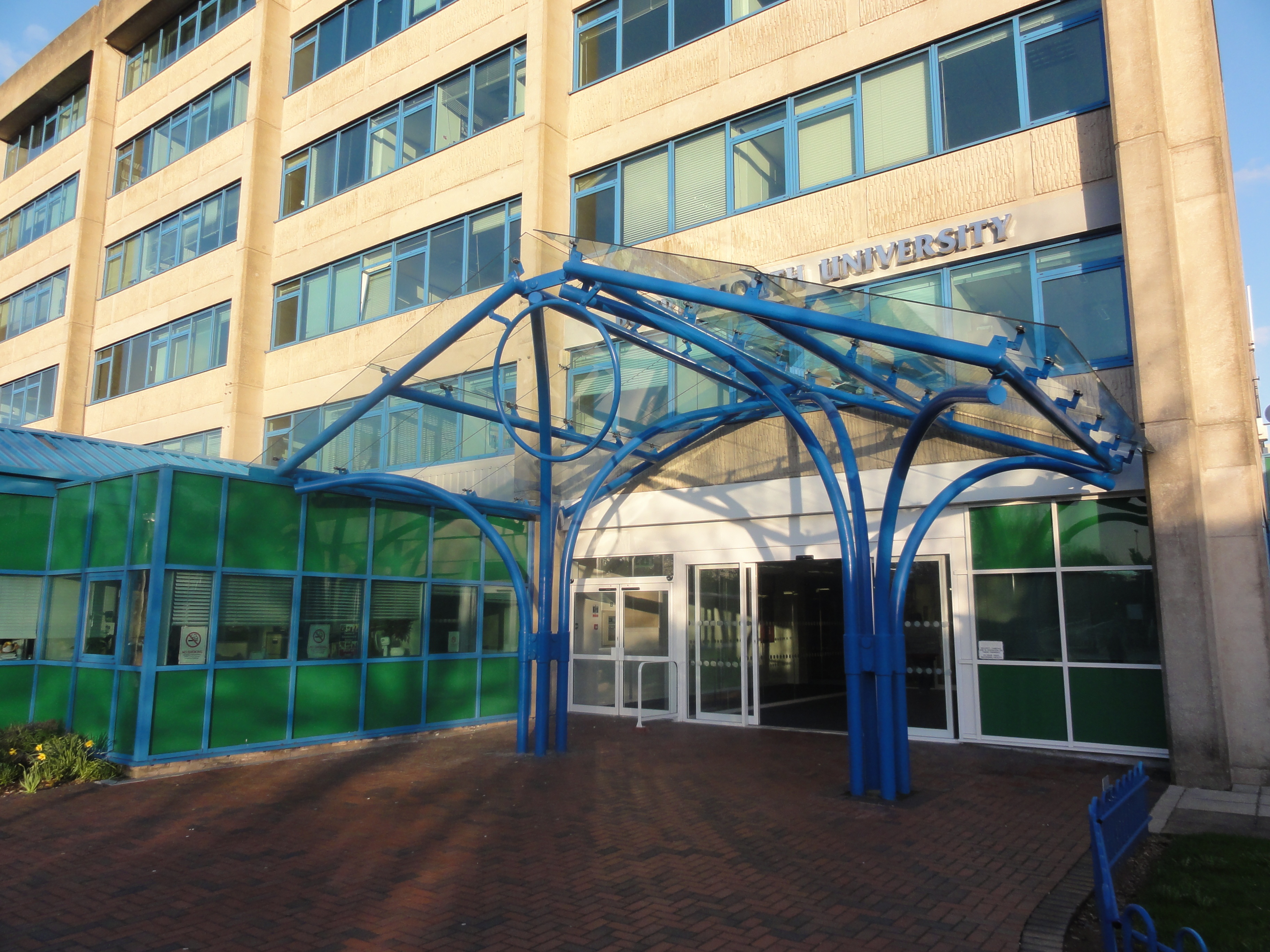
Main entrance on the Talbot Campus

Bournemouth University has two campuses: Talbot Campus and Lansdowne Campus.

=== Talbot Campus ===
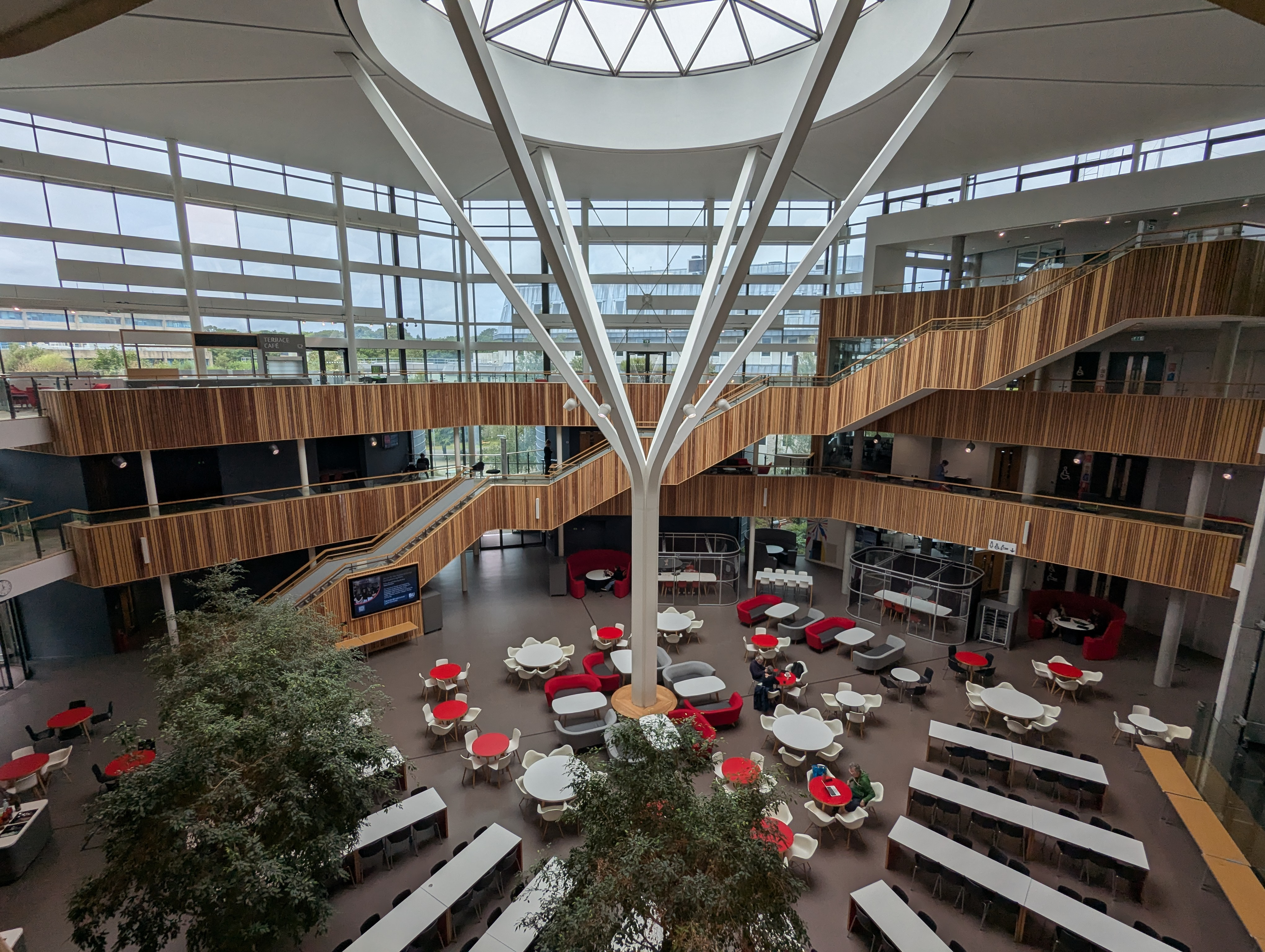
The interior of the Fusion Building on the Talbot Campus

The Talbot Campus is situated at Fern Barrow on the Poole side of the boundary with Bournemouth. It is where the main University buildings are located, including the students' union which hosts the student radio (Nerve Radio) studio. The main library and Dylans bar are also found here.

=== Lansdowne Campus ===
The Lansdowne Campus is just outside Bournemouth's town centre, housing three teaching and administrative buildings, the students' union nightclub and various halls of residence located around Christchurch Road, Oxford Road and Holdenhurst Road. A new Bournemouth University International College is currently being built at the campus. Unlike Talbot, Lansdowne is not a self-contained campus.

== Organisation and governance ==
Bournemouth University is currently divided into the following faculties:

- The Faculty of Science and Technology (Archaeology, Anthropology, Biology, Geography, Design, Engineering, Computing and Informatics, Forensic Sciences, and Psychology) - home to the Festival of Design & Innovation
- The Faculty of Media and Communication – home to the Centre for Intellectual Property Policy & Management (CIPPM), the Centre for Excellence in Media Practice, the National Centre for Computer Animation and the Centre for Broadcasting History Research
- The Faculty of Health and Social Sciences
- The Bournemouth University Business School – home to the International Centre for Tourism & Hospitality Research

=== List of chancellors ===
- 1992 – Caroline Cox, Baroness Cox, First Chancellor of university
- 2001 – John Taylor, Baron Taylor of Warwick
- 2006 – Dione Digby, Baroness Digby
- 2009 – Nick Phillips, Baron Phillips of Worth Matravers, former President of the Supreme Court and Senior Law Lord
- 2019 – Kate Adie CBE, DL

=== List of directors and vice chancellors ===
- 1983 – Bernard MacManus, as Director of the Dorset Institute
- 1990 – Bernard MacManus, as first Vice Chancellor
- 1994 – Gillian Slater
- 2005 – Sir Paul Curran, subsequently Vice Chancellor of City University London
- 2010 – John Vinney
- 2024 – Alison Honour

== Academic profile ==
Rankings
National rankings
- Complete (2027): 77
- Guardian (2026): 112
- Times / Sunday Times (2026): 79=

Global rankings
- QS (2027): 801–850
- THE (2026): 401–500

=== Awards ===
In 2011 the university was awarded the Queen's Anniversary Prize for Higher and Further Education, for "world-class computer animation teaching with wide scientific and creative applications". In 2014 the courses at the university were praised by the Prime Minister in Parliament.

=== Rankings and reputation ===
Bournemouth University appeared for the first time in the Times Higher Education World University Rankings in 2015/16: ranked joint 401–500 in the world and 57th among UK universities. The university experienced a brief upward trend in national rankings: in 2016, it rose from 65th to 54th in The Complete University Guide, from 71st to 63rd place in The Guardian University League Table and from 88th to joint 82nd in the Sunday Times Good University Guide. The high salary increases awarded to Bournemouth University Vice Chancellor John Vinney were justified as a reflection of this improvement.

== Student life ==
The Students' Union at Bournemouth University (SUBU) is based on the Talbot Campus at the Student Centre, which was opened in 2015. Its facilities are open to students at Lansdowne Campus and the partner colleges.

SUBU has over 120 clubs and societies for students to take part in alongside their studies at Bournemouth University. SUBU itself is composed of various departments, such as SUBU Advice, Democracy and Equality, Representation, Volunteering, Insight and Policy and Activities.

SUBU operates numerous venues including the nightclub The Old Fire station on the Lansdowne campus, the Student Shop, Ground Up Cafe and with Dylans Bar on Talbot.

== Notable people ==
=== Notable academics ===
- Timothy Darvill, awarded an OBE in the 2010 Queen's Birthday Honours List for services to archaeology.
- Derek Pitman, archaeologist and co-host of the Career in Ruins podcast.

=== Notable alumni ===
- Sir David Amess – Member of Parliament
- Carl Ashmore – children's author
- Angela Browning – Member of Parliament
- Holly Budge - conservationist, co-founder of the charity How Many Elephants
- Neil Duncan-Jordan - Member of Parliament for Poole
- C. E. M. Hansel – Emeritus Professor of Experimental psychology
- Nick Hector – filmmaker
- Rebecca Huxtable – assistant producer of The Scott Mills Show on BBC Radio 1
- Paul Kavanagh – short-listed for Oscar and lead animator for Industrial Light and Magic
- Max McMurdo - designer, entrepreneur, author, and television presenter
- Dan O'Hagan – commentator, BBC Match of the Day
- Gary Taphouse – commentator, Football First on Sky Sports
- Sophie Petzal - screenwriter, writer of Channel 5's Blood and Hollington Drive for ITV

== See also ==
- Armorial of UK universities
- List of UCAS institutions
- List of universities in the UK
- Post-1992 universities
