= Crewe bus station =

Bus station in Crewe, Cheshire, England

Coordinates: 53.0983423°N 2.44423707°W

Crewe
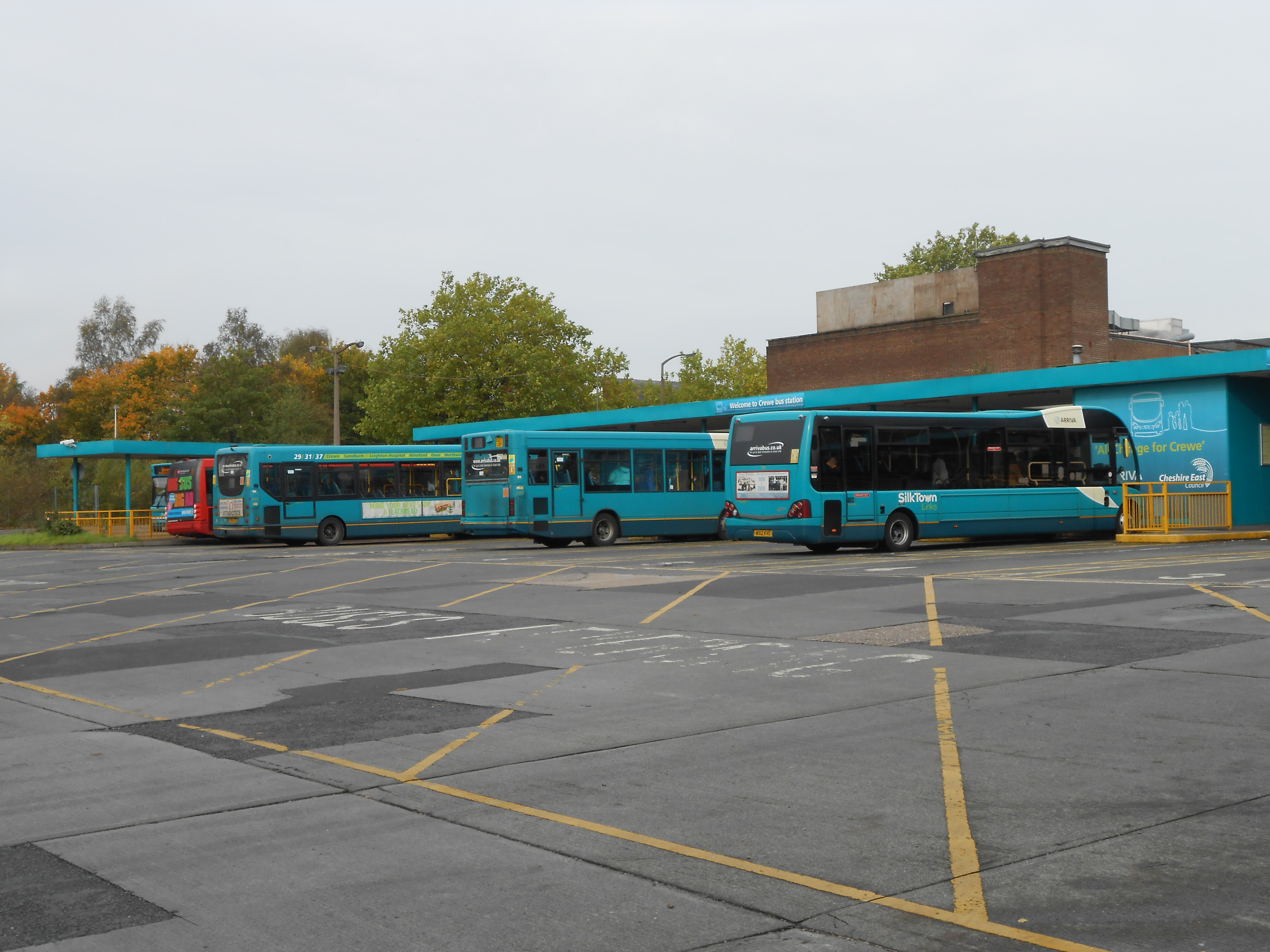
- The bus station in 2013

General information
- Location: Crewe; Cheshire East
- Operated by: Cheshire East Council
- Bus stands: 9 + 1 Coach
- Bus operators: D&G Bus; First Potteries; Mikro Coaches; Stagecoach Merseyside & South Lancashire

History
- Opened: May 2024
Location

Crewe bus station in Crewe, Cheshire East, England, is a bus terminus for approximately 11 bus services. It opened to the public on 7th May 2024 as part of the Royal Arcade development in Crewe town centre.

The bus station is located on Delamere Street, with access also from Victoria Street. The bus station has 9 bus stands and 1 coach stand, although no scheduled coach services are currently planned for the bus station.

In September 2021, planning permission was granted for the Royal Arcade development, with Phase 1 incorporating a 400 space multi-storey car park and 10 stand bus station. Following initial delays, in January 2023, the former bus station closed and a temporary bus station was placed, containing 8 stands, in the location near to the new bus station.

Cheshire East Council revealed the external artwork design for the new bus station in February 2023, which was subsequently placed on the eastern elevation of the new bus station, overlooking the new bus stands with the words ‘Forged by Hand’ sitting atop the bold inclusion of the town's name.

== Services ==
The majority of services are operated by D&G Bus, with First Potteries, Mikro Coaches and Stagecoach Merseyside & South Lancashire also using the station.

D&G Bus operate 10 routes from Crewe Bus Station including regular services in and around Crewe as well as to the nearby towns of Congleton, Macclesfield, Nantwich, Newcastle-under-Lyme, Northwich, Sandbach and Winsford.

Buses were also run from Crewe to Nantwich via villages in South Cheshire, operated by Mikro Coaches; Hanley by First Potteries and Chester via Nantwich by Stagecoach Merseyside & South Lancashire.

A full list of services is shown below:

Bus route	From	To	Via
8	Sydney	Wistaston Green	Crewe
12	Shavington	Leighton Hospital	Crewe
12A	Crewe Business Park	Leighton Hospital	Crewe
13	Shavington	Leighton Hospital	Crewe
31	Crewe	Northwich	Leighton Hospital and Winsford
37	Crewe	Northwich	Sandbach, Middlewich and Winsford
38	Crewe	Macclesfield	Sandbach and Congleton
39	Crewe	Nantwich	Shavington
42	Crewe	Congleton	Leighton Hospital, Middlewich and Holmes Chapel
84	Crewe	Chester	Willaston, Nantwich and Tarporley
84X	Crewe	Nantwich	
85	Nantwich	Newcastle-under-Lyme	Crewe, Madeley and Keele University
103	Crewe	Hanley	Alsager, Kidsgrove and Tunstall
