= Crewe Chronicle =

Local newspaper in Crewe

- Type: Weekly newspaper
- Owner: Reach plc
- Founded: 1874
- Circulation: 1,962 (as of 2023)
- Website: cheshire-live.co.uk/all-about/crewe

The Crewe Chronicle, originally known as the Crewe and Nantwich Chronicle, is an English regional weekly newspaper.

== History ==
The newspaper was first published on 21 March 1874. It was founded by the editor of the Chester Chronicle as a Radical alternative to the Tory-biased Crewe Guardian.

Now owned by Trinity Mirror, the Crewe Chronicle is published in a tabloid format every Wednesday and has a cover price of 82p. As of June 2012 the newspaper's circulation was 7,574.
