= National Centre for Computer Animation =

The National Centre for Computer Animation
- Established: 1989
- Research type: Teaching/Research
- Location: Bournemouth, UK
- Operating agency: Bournemouth University
- Website: ncca.bournemouth.ac.uk

The National Centre for Computer Animation (NCCA) is part of the Media School at Bournemouth University in the United Kingdom. Founded in 1989, it is often regarded as one of the best UK institutions available for study in the field of computer graphics, offering both undergraduate and postgraduate degree courses. Its first director was Peter Comninos. The interdisciplinary centre, operating under the motto 'Science in the service of the Arts', enjoys strong links with industry, with much of it consisting of NCCA graduates. In the 2001 national Research Assessment Exercise (RAE), the NCCA was awarded the maximum possible mark of 5 and performed similarly well in the 2008 RAE. NESTA's 'Livingstone-Hope Skills Review of Video Games and Visual Effects', launched in 2010, published its result in the Next Gen. report, which singles out the NCCA for 'excellence in visual effects education', placing it 'at the forefront of education for the visual effects and animation industries'. In 2011 the work of the NCCA at Bournemouth University was further recognised through the award of the Queen's Anniversary Prize for 'world-class computer animation teaching with wide scientific and creative applications'.

== Selected publications ==
- Vince, John, ed. (2003), Handbook of Computer Animation, London, UK: Springer-Verlag, ISBN 978-1852335649
- Stephenson, Ian, ed. (2005), Production Rendering: Design and Implementation, London, UK: Springer-Verlag, ISBN 978-1852338213
- Comninos, Peter (2006), Mathematical and Computer Programming Techniques for Computer Graphics, London, UK: Springer-Verlag, ISBN 978-1852339029
- Stephenson, Ian (2007), Essential RenderMan® (2nd ed.), London, UK: Springer-Verlag, ISBN 978-1846283444
- Pasko, A.; Adzhiev, V.; Comninos, P., eds. (2008), Heterogeneous Objects Modelling and Applications, Berlin Heidelberg, Germany: Springer-Verlag, ISBN 978-3540684411
