= NCAA (disambiguation) =

NCAA, or National Collegiate Athletic Association, is a non-profit association in the United States and Canada.

NCAA may also refer to:

- National Collegiate Athletic Association (Philippines), an unrelated athletics association in the Philippines
- Namibia Civil Aviation Authority
- Nigerian Civil Aviation Authority
- Norwegian Civil Aviation Administration
- Non-canonical amino acids, also called non-proteinogenic amino acids
