= National Joint Committee of Working Women's Organisations =

The National Joint Committee of Working Women's Organisations was an organisation representing women active in the labour movement in the United Kingdom.

The organisation was founded in 1916 by the National Federation of Women Workers, Women's Co-operative Guild, Women's Labour League, Women's Trade Union League and Railway Women's Guild, as the Standing Joint Committee of Industrial Women's Organisations (SJCIWO). It aimed to represent women workers, by helping them gain representation on relevant bodies at the local, national and international level. It became closely aligned with the Labour Party, and the Chief Women's Officer of the party acted as the group's secretary.

In 1931 Dorothy Elliott chaired the committee and she was also the lead for the National Labour Women’s Conference. She advocated minimum wages for a million workers who were in domestic service and catering. The policy was adopted by the Labour Conference that year but it went no further.

By 1932, the group's constitution stated that the following organisations could become affiliates: "the Labour Party, the Trades Union Congress, the Women's Co-operative Guild, and the Railway Women's Guild; and organisations affiliated to the Labour Party or the Trades Union Congress, of which a substantial number of the members are women, which are national in character, and are accepted by the committee".

In 1941, the group was renamed as the Standing Joint Committee of Working Women's Organisations', and then in 1952 it adopted its final name.

By 1993, the group's members believed that its purposes were better served by other organisations in the labour movement, and it dissolved.

== Secretaries ==
1916: Mary Longman
1917: Marion Phillips
1932: Mary Sutherland
1960: Sara Barker
1962: Constance Kay
1967: Betty Lockwood
1975: Joyce Gould
1985: Anne Wilkinson

== Chairs ==
1916: Mary Macarthur
1921: Margaret Bondfield
1923: Florence Harrison Bell
1925: Ellen Wilkinson

1928: Jennie Lee

1930: Clara Rackham
1931: Dorothy Elliott
1931: Barbara Ayrton-Gould
1932: Susan Lawrence

1934: Eleanor Barton
1935: Anne Loughlin

1937: Anne Godwin
1938: Grace Colman

1940: E. Martin

1943: K. M. Shade
1944: Florence Hancock
1946: Margaret Allen
1949: Mabel Crout

1952: Jessie Smith

1955: Phyllis Stedman
1957:
1967: Millie Miller
1969: T. Hinchey
1971: Joan Lipson
1983: Rita Stephen
