= Ada Maddocks =

British trade union official

Ada Maddocks (22 September 1927–7 March 2007) was a British trade union official.

Born in Felixstowe, Maddocks grew up in Walthamstow and was educated at Walthamstow High School before working in a laboratory for the Co-operative Wholesale Society. She became active in the co-operative movement, then began working for the National and Local Government Officers Association in 1961. In 1976, she assumed lead responsibility for health service employees in the union, and was elected to one of two women-only seats on the General Council of the Trades Union Congress. She was awarded an OBE in 1982, and served as President of the Trades Union Congress in 1990, actively supporting the ambulance workers' strike. She retired in 1992.

Trade union offices
Preceded by Marie Patterson and Audrey Prime	Women Workers member of the General Council of the Trades Union Congress; 1977–1990; With: Marie Patterson (1977–1985); Gina Morgan (1981–1988); Muriel Turner (1981–1987); Pat Turner (1981–1989); Olwyn Davies (1983–1987); Margaret Prosser (1985–1989); Bernadette Hillon and Ina Love (1987–1989); Liz Symons, Pam Thomas and Diana Warwick (1989–1990)	Succeeded by Jeannie Drake, Liz Symons, Pam Thomas and Diana Warwick
Preceded by Tony Christopher	President of the Trades Union Congress; 1990	Succeeded by Alec Smith
Preceded by Alec Smith	Trades Union Congress representative to the AFL-CIO; 1991	Succeeded by Garfield Davies
