= Marie Patterson =

British trade unionist (1934–2021)

Constance Marie Patterson CBE (1 April 1934 – 27 November 2021) was a British trade unionist.

Patterson attended Pendleton High School, Salford, and Bedford College, London, before becoming active in the Transport and General Workers' Union (TGWU). She was appointed as the union's women's officer in 1963, when she was also elected to the general council of the Trades Union Congress (TUC), while in 1966 she was elected to the executive of the Confederation of Shipbuilding and Engineering Unions (CSEU).

In 1975, Patterson was the President of the Trades Union Congress, and she also filled the post in 1977, following the death of Danny McGarvey. During the 1960s, she served on the Press Council, while, in the 1970s, she served on the Equal Opportunities Commission and the Central Arbitration Committee. She stood down from her trade union posts in 1984, but remained a member of the Hotel and Catering Training Board and the board of Remploy, and joined the council of the London School of Economics. She was a member of several other boards through the 1990s, but stood down from the last of her public positions in 2005. She was appointed Officer of the Order of the British Empire (OBE) in 1973 and Commander of the Order of the British Empire (CBE) in the 1978 New Year Honours.

Trade union offices
Preceded by Ellen McCullough	National Women's Officer of the Transport and General Workers' Union; 1963 – 1985	Succeeded by Margaret Prosser
Preceded by Anne Godwin and Ellen McCullough	Women Workers member of the General Council of the Trades Union Congress; 1963 – 1985; With: Winifred Baddeley (1963 – 1968); Audrey Prime (1968 – 1977); Ada Maddocks (1977 – 1985); Gina Morgan, Muriel Turner and Pat Turner (1981 – 1985); Olwyn Davies (1983 – 1985)	Succeeded by Olwyn Davies, Ada Maddocks, Gina Morgan, Margaret Prosser, Muriel Turner and Pat Turner
Preceded by Alfred Allen	President of the Trades Union Congress; 1975	Succeeded by Cyril Plant
Preceded by Danny McGarvey	President of the Trades Union Congress; 1977	Succeeded by David Basnett
Preceded by Len Edmondson	President of the Confederation of Shipbuilding and Engineering Unions; 1977–1978	Succeeded by Hugh Scanlon
