= National Institute of Houseworkers =

British institute for promotion of domestic labour

The National Institute of Houseworkers (NIH), later renamed the National Institute for Housecraft, was a UK organisation created in 1946 to raise the status of domestic employment. It arose from the Markham-Hancock Report on domestic service.

== Origins ==
Between the world wars, domestic work was the largest employer of female labour in Britain. 1.3 million women worked in the field in 1931. This work was physically demanding, provided poor wages, and limited workers' freedom and leisure time, and was also not well respected. Terms such as "menial" and "service" were used to refer to the work. The Central Committee on Women's Training and Employment (CCWTE) recognised that women much preferred factory work to domestic work.

During World War II, Ernest Bevin set up a Ministry of Labour enquiry into domestic service chaired by Violet Markham and Florence Hancock. The committee was concerned with the shortage of domestic workers and its impact on working women who were seen as carrying a "double burden" of paid work outside the home and unpaid domestic labour. Eugenic concerns about birth rates amongst professional women were connected with this, as women were seen as not wanting to have children without domestic support in the house.

The wartime impact of lack of domestic workers on farming families, doctors and hospitals, and the elderly was also of particular concern to the committee.

British architecture, with houses lacking labour-saving devices, was seen as contributing to the urgency of the need for home workers.

Markham suggested a Domestic Service Corps working in a similar way to the Women's Land Army but this was not created.

The Markham-Hancock Report was completed by July 1944 and published in June 1945. This recommended the creation of an Institute of Homeworkers, creation of which was announced by George Isaacs in February 1946.

== Work ==
The National Institute of Houseworkers was formally incorporated as a non-profit organisation in June 1946 to raise the status of domestic work and attract more workers. Its headquarters were based at 53 Mount Street in London and opened by Violet Attlee. Dorothy Elliott was the chair until 1959.

The Institute received grants from the Ministry of Labour, including around £75,000 in 1949 and £114,000 in 1950.

The Institute established a diploma course, created training centres, and stipulated minimum wages and work hours and conditions for its workers. A journal, The Houseworker, was created as the journal of the institute.

The board of the Institute hoped that providing high-quality training would raise the status of the profession as had happened with the professionalisation of nursing. By 1950, the Institute ran nine training centres and trained around 300 students per year. Much of its work involved training domestic workers to provide home help via local health authorities. The institute also set up a scheme to provide day helpers to private households in 18 towns.

Questions were raised in parliament about the efficiency of the Institute and in 1952, the government grant reduced by two thirds. Eight of the nine training centres were to close as a result, though the Bridge of Allan centre in Scotland continued, supported by the Scottish Association for Homecraft Training, and the Swansea centre reopened with funding from local education authorities.

By 1960, around 5,300 people had got the institute's diploma. The daily helper scheme ended in the mid-1960s. In 1963, the organisation was renamed the National Institute for Housecraft. By the 1970s, most domestic labourers worked in institutional settings such as hospitals, hotels, or schools.

In December 1971, the new Conservative government announced that the NIH would close.
