= Ellen McCullough =

British trade unionist (1908–1985)

- Born: Ellen Cecelia McCullough; 22 November 1908; St Pancras, London, England
- Died: 19 May 1985 (aged 76); Camden, London, England
- Occupation: Trade unionist

Ellen Cecelia McCullough (22 November 1908 – 19 May 1985) was a British trade unionist.

McCullough entered trade unionism when she was fourteen, working in the office of the Workers' Union. In 1929, this became part of the Transport and General Workers' Union (TGWU), for which she began working, and through the union obtained a scholarship to study at the London School of Economics. She lectured at one of the union's first one-day schools for new members, as early as 1944, and became the TGWU's Education Officer in 1946. She came to sit on the executives of the Workers' Educational Association (WEA) and the National Council of Labour Colleges. During the post-war period, she greatly expanded the union's education programme, for the first time offering much training exclusively to members of the union.

In 1958, McCullough became National Women's Officer of the TGWU. During this period, she also served on the General Council of the Trades Union Congress (TUC). She was now one of the most prominent women trade unionists of the period, alongside Ethel Chipchase, Florence Hancock, Anne Godwin and Anne Loughlin. She was a supporter of the Annual Conference of Unions Catering for Women Workers.

In 1963, McCullough was seconded from TGWU to work in the Education Department of the TUC. After two years, she returned to the TGWU, where she instead became National Secretary for Research, and from 1969, Education was also included in her remit. She served as president of the WEA from 1964 to 1971, and president of the International Federation of Workers' Education Associations from 1968 until 1972.

Trade union offices
Preceded by Florence Hancock	National Women's Officer of the Transport and General Workers' Union; 1958–1963	Succeeded by Marie Patterson
Preceded by Anne Godwin and Florence Hancock	Women Workers member of the General Council of the Trades Union Congress; 1958–1963; With: Anne Godwin	Succeeded by Winifred Baddeley and Marie Patterson
Preceded by ?	National Officer (Research) of the Transport and General Workers' Union; 1965–1970	Succeeded by Norman Willis
Academic offices
Preceded by Asa Briggs	President of the Workers' Educational Association; 1968 – 1971	Succeeded by Billy Hughes
Preceded by Sven-Arne Stahre	President of the International Federation of Workers' Educational Associations; 1968–1972	Succeeded by Josef Eksl
