= Adult Suffrage Society =

British women's suffrage organisation

The Adult Suffrage Society was one of several organisations formed in the United Kingdom during the Victorian and Edwardian eras, with the objective of campaigning for the extension of voting rights to women. Unlike bodies such as the Pankhursts' Women's Social and Political Union, the Adult Suffrage Society did not find acceptable the extension of the franchise to women on the same restricted terms that it was then given to men—that is, on the basis of a property qualification that excluded the majority of the working class. It wanted full adult suffrage, the unrestricted right to vote, for all adults aged 21 or over. The society's members were often referred to as "adultists".

In 1906 Margaret Bondfield became chair of the society, which supported the Franchise and Removal of Women'a Disabilities bill, introduced to parliament by Sir Charles Dilke on 2 March 1906. The bill, which proposed full adult suffrage, and the right of women to become MPs, was strongly opposed by the WSPU, as a distraction from its feminist agenda. The bill was "talked out" in the House of Commons. In 1907, in the course of a public debate with Teresa Billington-Greig of the Women's Freedom League (a breakaway group from the WSPU), Bondfield argued that the only way forward was a bill that enfranchised all men and all women, without qualification". She wished good luck to those fighting for a "same terms as men" suffrage bill, but "don't let them come and tell me that they are working for my class".

The Adult Suffrage Society was relaunched in 1909 as the People's Suffrage Federation (PSF), under the leadership of Margaret Llewelyn Davies.
