= Horan =

Origin
- Meaning: "warlike"
- Region of origin: Ireland

Other names
- Variant form: Ughrón

Horan is a surname that originated in County Galway, Ireland, and from there spread into County Mayo. According to historian C. Thomas Cairney, the O'Horans were one of the chiefly families of the Uí Mháine who in turn were a tribe of the Dumnonii or Laigin who were the third wave of Celts to settle in Ireland during the first century BC.

Notable people with the name Horan include:

- Alice Horan (1895–1971), British trade unionist
- Adelind Horan (born 1988), American actress
- Ann Marie Horan, actress on TG4 drama, Ros na Rún
- Charles Horan (1837–1900), Catholic priest in Australia
- Claude Horan (1917–2014), American sculptor
- Daniel Horan (born 1983), American Catholic priest, theologian, and author
- Gerard Horan (born 1962), English actor
- Hume Horan (1934–2004), American diplomat
- James Horan (1911–1986), Irish monsignor
- James Horan (actor) (born 1954), American character actor
- John Horan (politician) (1908–1971), Canadian politician
- John Horan (rugby league), rugby league footballer who played in the 1930s and 1940s
- Johnny Horan (1932–1980), American basketball player
- Kate Horan (born 1975), New Zealand paralympics runner
- Lindsey Horan (born 1994), United States (soccer) football player
- Marcus Horan (born 1977), Irish rugby union player
- Mike Horan (politician), Australian politician
- Mike Horan (American football) (born 1959), American football punter
- Monica Horan (born 1963), American actress
- Neil Horan (born 1947), defrocked Irish Roman Catholic clergyman
- Niall Horan (born 1993), Irish singer and member of the band One Direction
- Patrick Horan (c. 1800s), Irish baseball player
- Peter Horan (1926–2010), Irish flute & fiddle player
- Tim Horan (born 1970), Australian rugby union player
- Tom Horan (1854–1916), Australian cricketer & journalist
- Walt Horan (1898–1966), American politician

== See also ==
- Roger Ó hUghróin (died 1616), Chief of the Name
- Irish clans
