= Newlands Girls' School =

Coordinates: 51.5222°N 0.7587°W

Newland Girls' School

Location
- Farm Road; Maidenhead, Berkshire, SL6 5JB; England

Information
- Type: Academy
- Motto: Vincit veritas (Truth conquers)
- Established: 1905
- Founder: Mary Burn
- Local authority: Royal Borough of Windsor and Maidenhead
- Department for Education URN: 142357 Tables
- Ofsted: Reports
- Head teacher: Jo Capon
- Age: 11 to 18
- Enrolment: 1,119
- Houses: Austen, Bronte, Curie, Darling, Earhart, Frank (named after famous and notable women in history)
- Colours: Blue, grey
- Website: https://www.newlandsgirlsschool.co.uk/

Newlands Girls' School is a girls' secondary school and sixth form located in Maidenhead, Berkshire, England.

== History ==
It was founded as Maidenhead High School in 1905 by its first Headmistress, Mary Burn, moved to The Castle Hill Centre (then called The Elms) in 1907 and in 1959 moved to Farm Road, where it still stands today.

The school was renamed Newlands School in 1973 when it converted to comprehensive schooling. In September 1999 the school became a community school and was renamed to Newlands Girls' School. In 2002 the school achieved the status of a Technology College and the Sportsmark Award. In 2004 it was then awarded the Artsmark Award. The school celebrated its centenary in 2005 after being established for 100 years.

In October 2015 Newlands Girls' School converted to academy status.

== Alumni ==
The trade unionist and feminist Dorothy Elliott attended the County Girls' school, Maidenhead before she took modern languages at the University of Reading graduating in 1916. Elliott went on to take a leading role in establishing better wages for women.

Social media creator Jade Bowler, known by her online pseudonym Unjaded Jade, attended the school.
