= Dorothy Elliott =

- Born: Dorothy Mary Elliott; 19 May 1896; Maidenhead, England
- Died: 25 November 1980 (aged 84); Pontrilas, England
- Occupation: trade unionist
- Spouse: John Owen Jones

Dorothy Mary Elliott (married name Dorothy Mary Jones) (19 May 1896 – 25 November 1980) was a leading British feminist and trade unionist. She was Chairman (sic) of the National Institute of Houseworkers until 1959.

== Life ==
Elliott was born in 1896 in Maidenhead. Her parents were Alice Mary (born Taylor) and William James Elliott and they were both teachers. She was the oldest of their three children. She attended the County Girls’ school in Maidenhead before she won a scholarship which enabled her to take modern languages at the University of Reading graduating with a third class degree in 1916. Edith Morley gave her career advice - she believed that women needed to compete in a wider range of professions and she encouraged her to take work in Kynoch's munitions factory at Witton, Birmingham. She was paid less, because she was a woman, but the wages were better than she was used to. She had to work two ten hour shifts every week. One week would be daytime shifts and the following week would be shifts at night with an increased hourly rate.

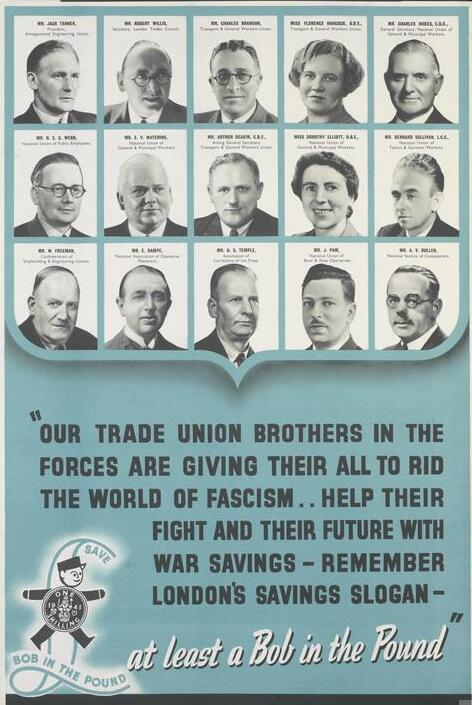
"At least a bob in the pound" - a campaign to encourage saving in 1943

Elliott enrolled on a course at the London School of Economics where she was taught by the influential historian R.H.Tawney. She gained experience on the social science course working with Mary Macarthur's National Federation of Women Workers (NFWW).

The NFWW employed her to recruit new members at the Woolwich Arsenal. She was paid poor wages for 14 hour days, seven days a week. At the end of the war the arsenal laid off 26,000 employees with just a week's notice. The NFWW successfully argued that they should be paid money for three months. By 1921 the NFWW had merged into the General and Municipal Workers Union and she was employed in Lancashire until she moved to London. She had married John Owen Jones in 1923 who had been a teacher but he was then a student at the Royal College of Music becoming a Welsh folk baritone singer known as "Owen Bryngwyn".

In 1931 she chaired the Standing Joint Committee of Industrial Women's Organisations and she also was the lead for the National Labour Women’s Conference. She advocated minimum wages for a million workers who were in domestic service and catering. The policy was adopted by the Labour Conference that year.

From 1938 and during the war she was the GMWU's Chief Women's Officer. Her husband returned to being a science teacher in 1939. She was involved in the National Government serving on committees for Ernest Bevin. Whilst at the GMWU she featured on a poster of leading "trade union brothers" who were encouraging workers to save a shilling out of pound earned. At the end of the war she became the Chairman (sic) of the National Institute of Home Workers, a post she held until 1959.

Elliott had no children and her husband died in 1972 and she died in Pontrilas in 1980. She left an autobiography that she had written in 1969 titled "Women in Search of Justice". Elliott's papers are held at the TUC library.
