= Mary Quaile =

Irish trade unionist

Mary T. Quaile (8 August 1886 – 16 December 1958) was an Irish trade unionist.

Born in Dublin, Quaile grew up in Manchester, and left school at the age of twelve. Initially a domestic servant, she soon moved to work in a cafe. While there, Margaret Bondfield visited the city to organise workers. Inspired, Quaile began persuading catering workers in the city to join a union. As a result, in 1911, she was appointed as Assistant Organiser of the Manchester Women's Trade Union Council (WTUC), then later as its Organising Secretary.

In 1919, the WTUC became part of Manchester Trades Council, and Quaile became the National Woman Officer of the Dock, Wharf, Riverside and General Labourers' Union, which later became part of the Transport and General Workers' Union. She was also active at the Trades Union Congress (TUC), and served on the General Council of the TUC from 1923 to 1926. From 1923, Quaile was secretary of the Manchester Trades Council's Women's Section, and soon was also the council's treasurer.

In 1925, Quaile led a women's TUC delegation to the Soviet Union. She was also appointed to the Women's Advisory Committee of the International Federation of Trade Unions. Due to poor health, she resigned from all her national posts in 1933, but became a magistrate in 1934, and retained her trades council roles into the 1950s.

Trade union offices
Preceded by New position	National Women's Officer of the Transport and General Workers' Union; 1922 – 1929	Succeeded by Julia Varley
Preceded by Margaret Bondfield and Julia Varley	Women Workers member of the General Council of the Trades Union Congress; 1923 – 1926; With: Julia Varley (1923 – 1925); Margaret Bondfield (1925 – 1926)	Succeeded by Margaret Bondfield and Julia Varley
