= Anne Godwin =

British trade unionist

Dame Beatrice Annie Godwin DBE (6 July 1897 – 11 January 1992), known as Anne Godwin, was a British trade unionist.

== Early life ==
Born in July 1897 in Farncombe, Surrey, Godwin's father was a draper. She attended school in Godalming until age 15, in 1912, when she left to start working as a counting house clerk in London's West End. In 1916, she joined the Army Pay Office as a civilian clerk, earning 16 shillings a week. Other women working at the office organised to unsuccessfully request a higher salary from the Army Paymaster. She joined the Association of Women Clerks and Secretaries (AWCS) after moving to an engineer's office in 1920.

By 1928, she worked as a trade union organiser and handled responsibilities related to negotiations and general administration.

== Later life ==
In 1940, a majority of AWCS members voted in favour of amalgamation. The two unions joined and became known as the Clerical and Administrative Workers Union. Anne Godwin was Assistant General Secretary, and edited the union's journal, entitled The Clerk. From 1961 to 1962, she served as one of the first women to become President of the Trades Union Congress (TUC), Britain's main organisation of trades unions, following Margaret Bondfield, Anne Loughlin and Florence Hancock.

Appointed a Dame Commander of the Order of the British Empire in 1962, Dame Anne Godwin was the guest speaker at the 1980 Conference when the union celebrated its 90th anniversary.

Trade union offices
Preceded by Dorothy Evans	General Secretary of the Association of Women Clerks and Secretaries; 1931 – 1941	Succeeded by Position abolished
Preceded by George Walker Thomson	President of the National Federation of Professional Workers; 1948 – 1956	Succeeded by Jim Bradley
Preceded by Florence Hancock and Anne Loughlin	Women Workers member of the General Council of the Trades Union Congress; 1949 – 1963; With: Florence Hancock (1949 – 1958); Ellen McCullough (1958 – 1963)	Succeeded by Winifred Baddeley and Marie Patterson
Preceded by Fred Woods	General Secretary of the National Union of Clerks and Administrative Workers; 1956–1963	Succeeded by Henry Chapman
Preceded by Ted Hill	President of the Trades Union Congress; 1962	Succeeded by Frederick Hayday
Preceded by Claude Bartlett and Bill Webber	Trades Union Congress representative to the AFL-CIO; 1963; With: Harry Douglass	Succeeded by William Carron and George Lowthian
