= Marian Veitch =

British trade unionist and politician

- Born: 8 July 1913; Sheffield, England
- Died: 24 July 1973 (aged 60)
- Education: Huntsman's Gardens School, Ruskin College
- Occupations: trade unionist, politician
- Known for: serving on union posts
- Notable work: National Union of General and Municipal Workers, Confederation of Shipbuilding and Engineering Unions, International Metalworkers' Federation
- Spouse: Donald Barnie (m. 1965)

Marian Veitch (8 July 1913 – 24 July 1973) was a British trade unionist and politician.

Born in Sheffield, Veitch attended Huntsman's Gardens School before working as an insurance clerk. She also became active in the Labour Party and, later, studied at Ruskin College.

In 1945, Veitch was elected to Sheffield City Council, serving while continuing to work as a clerk. During this period, she took particular interest in the education of disabled children. At the 1951 United Kingdom general election, she stood in Leeds North West, taking second place with 37.5% of the vote.

She resigned from both the council and her work as a clerk in 1956, to take up the full-time post of Yorkshire District Organiser with the National Union of General and Municipal Workers. In 1960, she was promoted to become the union's national women's officer.

Veitch joined the executive of the Confederation of Shipbuilding and Engineering Unions in 1962, the only woman to serve on it in this period. She was also active in the International Metalworkers' Federation and served on the Food Standards Committee from 1965 to 1968.

In 1965, Veitch married Donald Barnie, a lecturer at Hendon Polytechnic. She retired from her union posts in 1970.

Trade union offices
| Preceded by Alice Horan | National Women's Officer of the National Union of General and Municipal Workers; 1960–1970 | Succeeded by Pat Turner |
