= Audrey Prime =

British trade unionist

Audrey Mary Prime (1915 – 2 May 2001) was a British trade unionist.

== Career ==
Prime grew up in Sutton-in-Ashfield and attended the local grammar school. She began working in local government as a shorthand typist at the town hall in Kirkby-in-Ashfield in 1936, immediately after leaving school, and joined the National Association of Local Government Officers (NALGO). She was soon elected to a local union committee, then in 1944 began working full-time for the union in London. She was appointed as assistant national organiser of the union's local government section in 1957, then in 1962 as its national organiser for health staffs. From then until 1972, she also chaired the staff side of the Whitley Council for Professional and Technical staff, and for Administrative and Clerical Staffs.

Prime also became active at the Trades Union Congress (TUC), and in 1968 was elected to the General Council of the TUC, one of only two women to serve on it in this period. She was the founding chair of the TUC's Health Services Committee, and also served on its Economic Committee, International Committee, Social Insurance and Industrial Welfare Committee, Employment Policy and Organisation Committee, Equal Rights Committee and Women's Advisory Committee. In addition, she was a member of the Consultative Committee on Women Workers of the International Confederation of Free Trade Unions.

In 1977, Prime retired from her trade union posts, but she continued to serve on the Royal Commission on the National Health Service, and also chaired a committee which set pay scales for TUC staff.

Prime was made an Officer of the Order of the British Empire in the 1975 New Year Honours.

Trade union offices
Preceded by Ben Smith	National Organiser (Health Staffs) at the National and Local Government Officers Association; 1962–1977	Succeeded by Ada Maddocks
Preceded by Winifred Baddeley and Marie Patterson	Women Workers member of the General Council of the Trades Union Congress; 1968–1977; With: Marie Patterson	Succeeded by Ada Maddocks and Marie Patterson
