= Winifred Baddeley =

British trade unionist

Winifred Lucy Baddeley (2 December 1904 – 20 July 1972) was a British trade unionist.

Born in Sale, then in Cheshire, Baddeley worked for many years as an electrical coil winder at the Associated Electrical Industries works in Old Trafford. She joined the Amalgamated Engineering Union (AEU) and gradually rose through the ranks, becoming a shop steward in 1941, then branch chair, chair of the women's works committee, and district representative.

Baddeley was regarded as being on the right wing of the trade union movement, although she campaigned strongly for equal pay for women, and argued that women's marginality in trade unions was partly due to the attitudes of many male trade unionists.

In 1963, Baddeley attended the Trades Union Congress (TUC) for this first time, and was immediately elected to the General Council of the TUC; she was the first women who was not a full-time official to serve on the council. During this period, she chaired the TUC's Women's Advisory Committee. She retired in 1968.

In her spare time, Baddeley served as a magistrate, and on her Local Employment Committee. She married in 1963 and, unusually for the time, retained her maiden name.

Trade union offices
| Preceded by Anne Godwin and Ellen McCullough | Women Workers member of the General Council of the Trades Union Congress; 1963 – 1968; With: Marie Patterson | Succeeded by Marie Patterson and Audrey Prime |
