= Alec Smith (trade unionist) =

British trade unionist (1930–2021)

Alexander Smith (6 February 1930 – July 2021) was a British trade unionist.

Smith studied with the Clothing Institute in 1958, before becoming prominent in the National Union of Tailors and Garment Workers (NUTGW). In 1974, he was elected Assistant Secretary of the union, then in 1979, he was elected as General Secretary.

In 1991, Smith led the union into a merger with the GMB Union. He then became National Officer of the GMB, and served a term as President of the Trades Union Congress. He died in 2021.

Trade union offices
Preceded by Jack Macgougan	General Secretary of the National Union of Tailors and Garment Workers; 1979–1991	Succeeded by Position abolished
Preceded by Jack Macgougan	Clothing Group representative on the General Council of the TUC; 1979–1982	Succeeded by Council reorganised
Preceded by Fred Jarvis	Trades Union Congress representative to the AFL–CIO; 1989	Succeeded by Ada Maddocks
Preceded by Ada Maddocks	President of the Trades Union Congress; 1991	Succeeded by Rodney Bickerstaffe
