= Julia Varley =

English trade unionist and suffragette (1871-1952)

Julia Varley OBE
- Julia Varley in later life
- Born: 16 March 1871; Bradford, Yorkshire, England
- Died: 24 November 1952 (aged 81); Yorkshire, England
- Resting place: Undercliffe Cemetery, Bradford, Yorkshire
- Monuments: Blue plaque in Birmingham
- Occupation: Trade unionist
- Parents: Richard Varley (father); Martha Ann Alderson (mother)

Julia Varley, OBE (16 March 1871, Bradford, Yorkshire – 24 November 1952, Yorkshire) was an English trade unionist and suffragette.

== Early life ==
Born at 4, Monk Street in Horton in Bradford, she was one of seven surviving children out of nine born to Martha Ann née Alderson (1849-1896) and Richard Varley (1847-1913), an "Engine Tenter" according to the 1911 Census, meaning he oversaw the operation of the engine driving the machinery at a local woollen mill. The family lived in Horton Bradford. Her maternal grandfather, Joseph B. Alderson (1796-1886), was among those protesting during the Peterloo Massacre of 1819 and was a Chartist during the 1830s, and it was perhaps from him that she inherited her social conscience and desire to campaign for the rights of ordinary working people.

In 1883 at the age of 12 she worked as a 'half-timer', attending school but also working as a sweeper. A 'full-timer' at the age of 14, she joined the General Union of Textile Workers and quickly became a full-time organiser and branch secretary. In 1886 aged just 15, she became the secretary of the Bradford Weavers' and Textile Workers' Union.

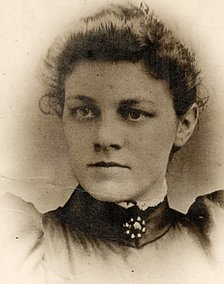
Julia Varley

In the 1891 Census Varley is listed as a "Worsted Weaver", and during this period she showed her early commitment to the rights of working people when she supported textile workers at Manningham Mills when they went on strike over low pay and poor working conditions. She talked to workers about the importance of joining a union. On the death of her mother in 1896 Varley became responsible for caring for her younger siblings until 1902, at the same time still working long hours at the mill while also maintaining her trade union efforts.

== Suffragette ==
Varley was the first woman to join the Bradford Trades Council in 1900, and went on to serve on the Council for seven years. Aged 24 she chose to live for six weeks as a tramp, walking or ‘tramping’ from Leeds to Liverpool to see what it was like to live on Poor Law handouts. She served on the Board of the Poor Law Guardians of Bradford between 1904 and 1907.

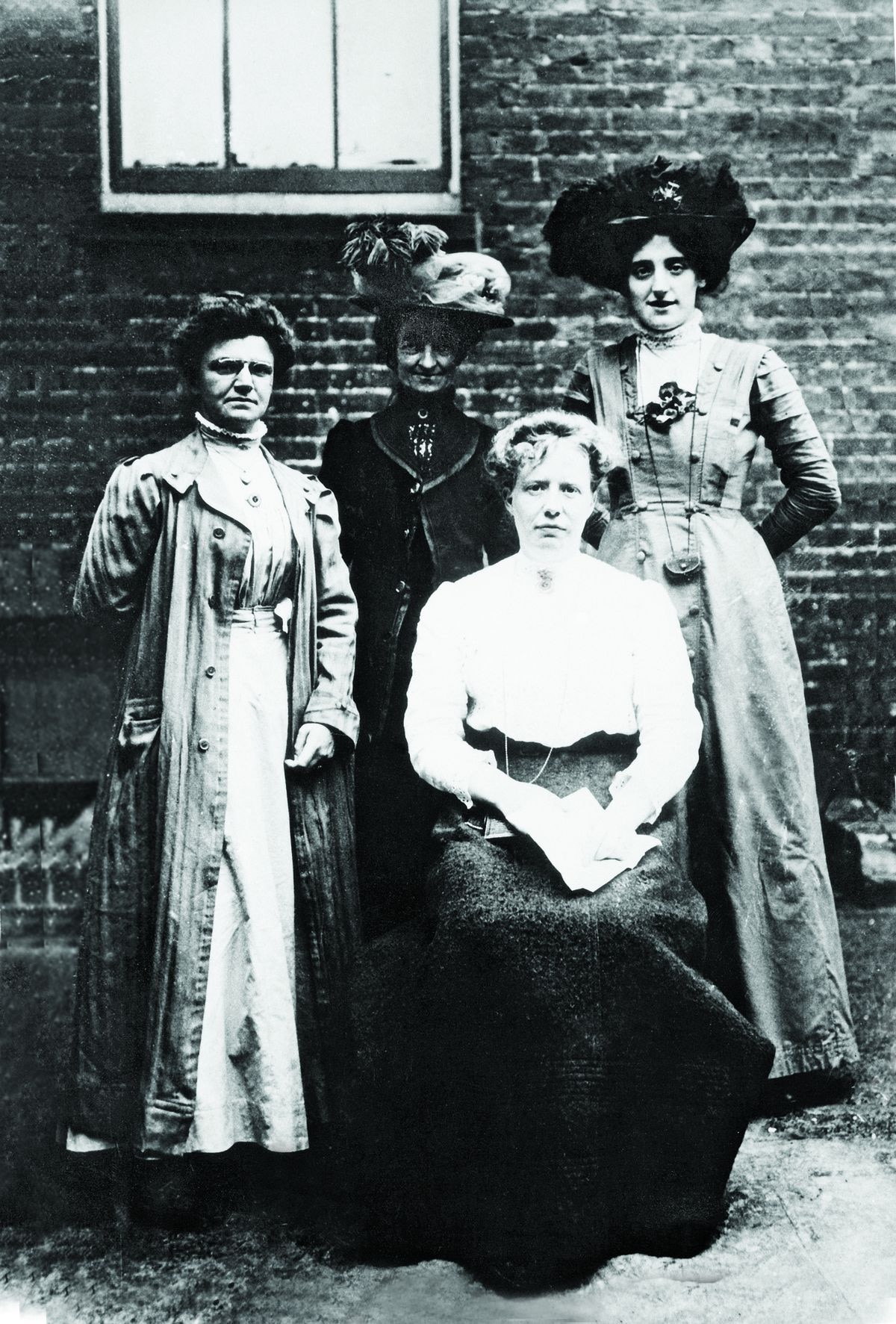
Varley (left) with suffragette and trade unionist Mary Macarthur (seated) in 1908

Varley joined the Women's Social and Political Union (WSPU), with whom in February 1907 she was involved in a raid on the floor of the House of Commons. She refused to pay a fine for disturbance and obstruction and was sentenced to 14 days in Holloway Prison. Varley served a second sentence for a similar action and was released on April 20, 1907. For these actions she was awarded the Holloway brooch by the WSPU. In 1909 Varley moved to Birmingham and established a branch of the National Federation of Women Workers at the Cadbury factory at Bournville. She was also involved in the Cradley Heath women chainmakers' strike of 1910, led by Mary Macarthur, and the Black Country strike of 1913, and later sat on the General Council of the Trades Union Congress.

== Trade unionist ==
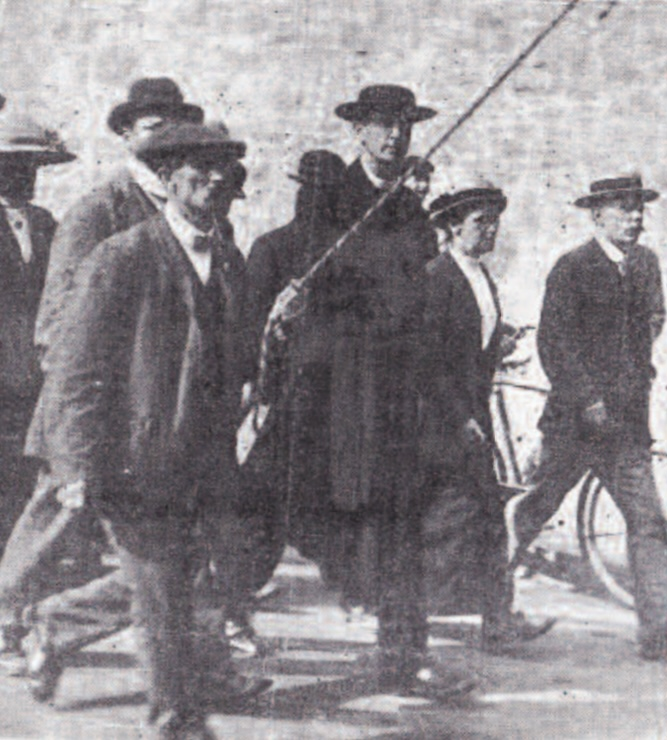
Varley (centre) leading a March in support of striking Cornish Clay workers

From 1912 to 1929 Varley was an organiser for the Workers' Union. In 1913 she supported the Workers' Union when 5,000 Cornish Clay workers went on strike. Until 1915 Varley was the only female organiser in the Workers' Union, actively working for the Union as an organiser throughout World War I, even though she endured a serious operation on her throat in 1917. Varley disagreed with many of the male members of the Birmingham Trades Council when the government introduced conscription, joining the breakaway Birmingham Trade Union Industrial Council. In 1918 Varley joined five other women who were sent to France to investigate rumours that WAACs serving there during WWI had behaved in an immoral way. Varley and the other women found the rumours to be baseless, finding instead that the women had actually served with distinction.

In 1920 in Birmingham Varley founded a Domestic Servants' Union to take on the plight of the 1.25 million female domestic servants. Varley set up a social club for these women in Birmingham which the Daily Chronicle referred to as a "servants’ paradise". At the same time a Servants' Charter of appropriate working conditions for the women was issued covering working hours, time off, a minimum wage, their own bedroom, that the employer was responsible for paying for their uniform and that they should be addressed by their proper names. Varley was a member of a 1923 Ministry of Labour enquiry into the problem of the 'servant shortage'. This, she stated, was largely down to parents wanting a better life for their daughters, rather than have them endure the drudgery of domestic service. Varley also worked with the Society for the Overseas Settlement of British Women, and in 1925 travelled to Canada to meet women who had settled there. At this time she was also involved in the work of the Industrial Welfare Society, which was concerned with the struggle for employer-provided lunchrooms and restrooms.

Varley was Women Workers member of the General Council of the Trades Union Congress (1921–1935), and Chief Women's Officer of the Transport and General Workers' Union (1929–1936).

== Later years ==
She was appointed OBE in 1931 for Public Service. In 1928 and 1937 Varley underwent surgery on her eyes and eventually went blind. In September 1935 she was a member of a large international delegation to the League of Nations in Geneva which addressed the claim for equality for women around the world. She was the principal speaker of the delegation in her role on the Women's Committee of the Trades Union Congress (TUC) and the International Committee of Trade Union Women. She retired in 1938 but continued to live in Birmingham, but because of her failing health and blindness she went to live with her widowed sister Jessie Wooller in Bradford in Yorkshire. Julia Varley died in November 1952 aged 81 at 32 Hampden Street in Bradford and was buried in Undercliffe Cemetery. She never married and left an estate valued at £1419 14s 3d to her sister Jessie.

In May 2013, she was commemorated by the erection of a blue plaque at her former home at 42 Hay Green Lane, Bournville, by the Birmingham Civic Society. The archive of her papers is held at Hull University Archives.

Trade union offices
Preceded by Alfred Smalley and W. E. Harvey	Auditor of the Trades Union Congress; 1910; With: John Cairns	Succeeded by W. E. Harvey and James E. Tattersall
Preceded by New position	Women Workers member of the General Council of the Trades Union Congress; 1921 – 1925; With: Margaret Bondfield (1921 – 1923); Mary Quaile (1923 – 1925)	Succeeded by Margaret Bondfield and Mary Quaile
Preceded by Margaret Bondfield and Mary Quaile	Women Workers member of the General Council of the Trades Union Congress; 1926 – 1935; With: Margaret Bondfield (1926 – 1929); Anne Loughlin (1929 – 1935)	Succeeded by Florence Hancock and Anne Loughlin
Preceded by Mary Quaile	Chief Women's Officer of the Transport and General Workers' Union; 1929 – 1936	Succeeded by Florence Hancock
