= Roger Ó hUghróin =

Roger Ó hUghróin (died 1616) was Chief of the Name.

Ó hUghróin was a native of Síol Anmchadha in what is now the diocese of Clonfert, County Galway. He appears to be the only attested Chief of his Name from Gaelic times.

In 1838, John O'Donovan recorded the following inscription on his tombstone, located on the floor of Clonfert Cathedral:

IHS. - His Jacet Dns Rogerus Horan precipuus sue nati9onatis, hunc tumullum isbbi ac posteris suis fecit feiri. Anno Domini 1616.

Anglicised as Horan, descendants of the clan are still found in south-east Galway.

== See also ==
- Horan
- Charles Horan O.F.M., 1837-1900
