= Alice Horan =

British trade unionist

Alice Horan (died 1971) was a British trade unionist.

Born in London, Horan was the oldest child of nine. She began working at the age of fourteen in a stationery factory, then became a dressmaker. During World War I, she worked in a factory making equipment for the armed forces, and while there she joined the National Federation of Women Workers.

Horan soon became a shop steward and got to know Mary Macarthur. She won a scholarship to Ruskin College, where she obtained a diploma in political science. In 1926, she found a full-time post as the Lancashire Women's District Officer for the National Union of General and Municipal Workers (NUGMW). She proved successful at recruiting to the union, and in 1946 was promoted to become the union's National Women's Officer.

Horan was also active in the Labour Party, serving on its National Executive Committee from 1951 until 1958.

Trade union offices
Preceded by Dorothy Elliott	National Women's Officer of the National Union of General and Municipal Workers; 1946 – 1960	Succeeded by Marian Veitch
