= Margaret Bondfield =

British feminist and trade unionist (1873–1953)

The Right Honourable Margaret Bondfield CH JP
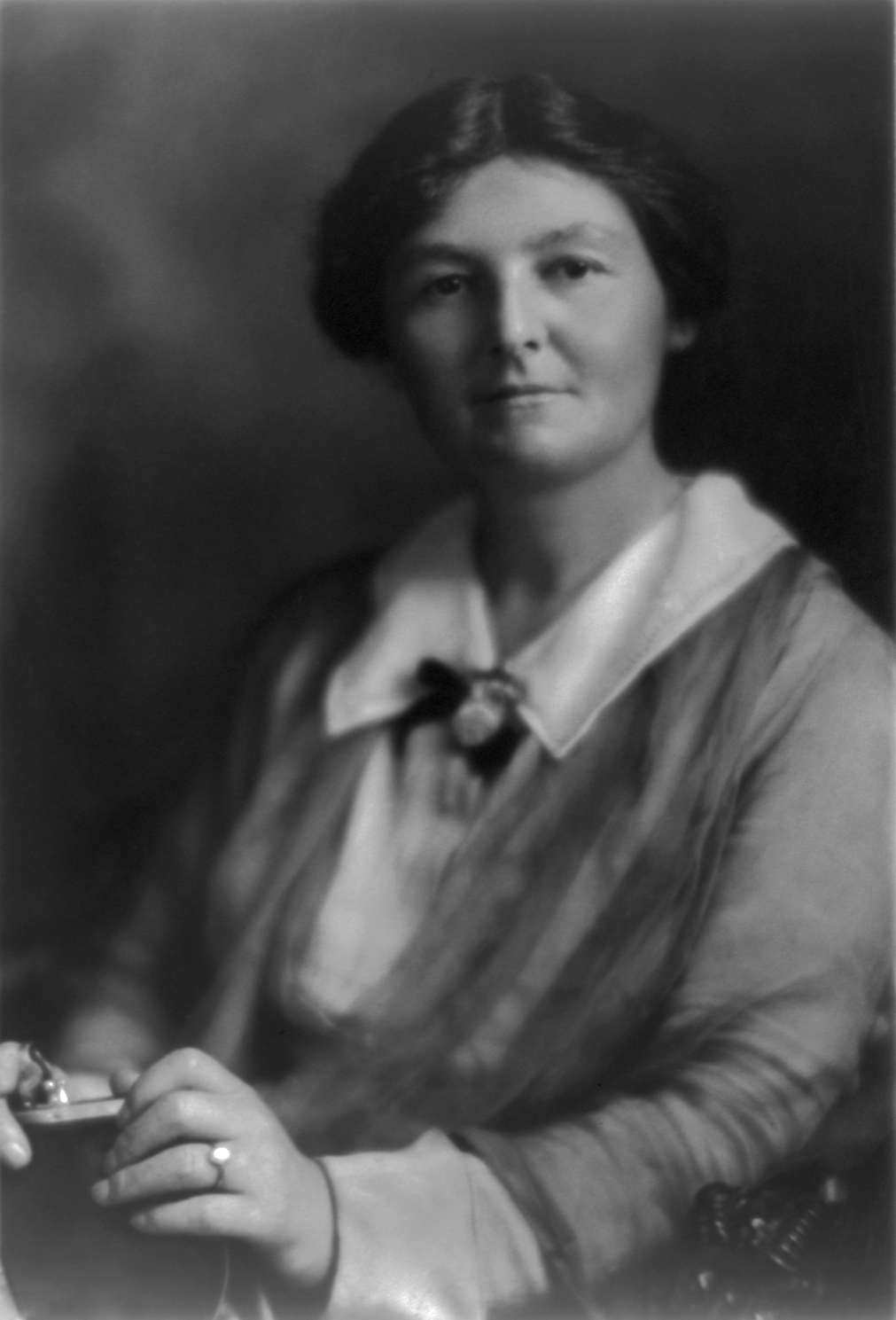
- Bondfield in 1919

Minister of Labour
- In office 8 June 1929 – 24 August 1931
- Prime Minister: Ramsay MacDonald
- Preceded by: Sir Arthur Steel-Maitland
- Succeeded by: Sir Henry Betterton

Member of Parliament for Wallsend
- In office 21 July 1926 – 7 October 1931
- Preceded by: Sir Patrick Hastings
- Succeeded by: Irene Ward

Member of Parliament for Northampton
- In office 6 December 1923 – 9 October 1924
- Preceded by: Charles McCurdy
- Succeeded by: Arthur Holland

Personal details
- Born: Margaret Grace Bondfield; 17 March 1873 Chard, Somerset, England
- Died: 16 June 1953 (aged 80) Sanderstead, Surrey, England
- Party: Labour

Margaret Grace Bondfield (17 March 1873 – 16 June 1953) was a British Labour Party politician, trade unionist and women's rights activist. She became the first female cabinet minister, and the first woman to be a privy counsellor in the UK, when she was appointed Minister of Labour in the Labour government of 1929–31. She had earlier become the first woman to chair the General Council of the Trades Union Congress (TUC).

Bondfield was born in humble circumstances and received limited formal education. After serving an apprenticeship to an embroideress she worked as a shop assistant in Brighton and London. She was shocked by the working conditions of shop staff, particularly within the "living-in" system, and became an active member of the shopworkers' union. She began to move in socialist circles, and in 1898 was appointed assistant secretary of the National Amalgamated Union of Shop Assistants, Warehousemen and Clerks (NAUSAWC). She was later prominent in several women's socialist movements: she helped to found the Women's Labour League (WLL) in 1906, and was chair of the Adult Suffrage Society. Her standpoint on women's suffrage—she favoured extending the vote to all adults regardless of gender or property, rather than the limited "on the same terms as men" agenda pursued by the militant suffragists—divided her from the militant leadership.

After leaving her union post in 1908 Bondfield worked as organising secretary for the WLL and later as women's officer for the National Union of General and Municipal Workers (NUGMW). She was elected to the TUC Council in 1918, and became its chairman in 1923, the year she was first elected to parliament. In the short-lived minority Labour government of 1924 she served as parliamentary secretary in the Ministry of Labour. Her term of cabinet office in 1929–31 was marked by the economic crises that beset the second Labour government. Her willingness to contemplate cuts in unemployment benefits alienated her from much of the Labour movement, although she did not follow Ramsay MacDonald into the National Government that assumed office when the Labour government fell in August 1931. Bondfield remained active in NUGMW affairs until 1938, and during the Second World War carried out investigations for the Women's Group on Public Welfare.

== Childhood and family ==
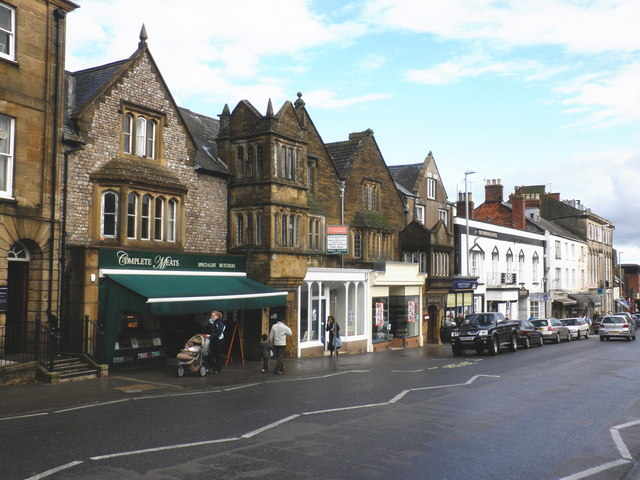
A modern (2009) photograph of the main street in Chard, Somerset, Bondfield's home town

Margaret Bondfield, known in private life as "Maggie", was born on 17 March 1873 in Chard, Somerset. She was the tenth of eleven children, and third of four daughters born to William Bondfield and his wife Ann (née Taylor), the daughter of a Congregational minister. William Bondfield worked as a lacemaker, and had a history of political activism. As a young man he had been secretary of the Chard Political Union, a centre of local radicalism that the authorities had on occasion suppressed by military force. (Note: A Chard Political Union tract, "Results of the Funding System", was published in the Chartist Circular of 23 November 1839. It attacked the mismanagement and corruption of government that had swelled the National Debt to £850 million that, if measured in gold sovereigns, "would load as many waggons as would extend for eighty miles".) He had also been active in the Anti-Corn Law League of the 1840s. Entirely self-educated, he was fascinated by science and engineering, and was the co-designer of a flying machine, a prototype of the modern aircraft, that was exhibited at the Great Exhibition of 1851.

While Margaret was still an infant, William lost his job and was unable to find regular work. The family suffered hardship, with the threat of the workhouse a constant fear. Nevertheless, William and Ann did their best to ensure that their children were educated and prepared for life. Margaret was a clever child, whose skills at reciting poetry or playing piano pieces were often displayed at town events and Sunday School outings. Until the age of 13 she attended the local elementary school; she then worked for a year as a pupil-teacher (she was paid three shillings a week) in the school's boys' department. Local employment opportunities being scarce, she left Chard in 1887, at the age of 14, to begin an apprenticeship at a draper's shop in Hove, near Brighton.

== Early career ==
=== Shop worker ===
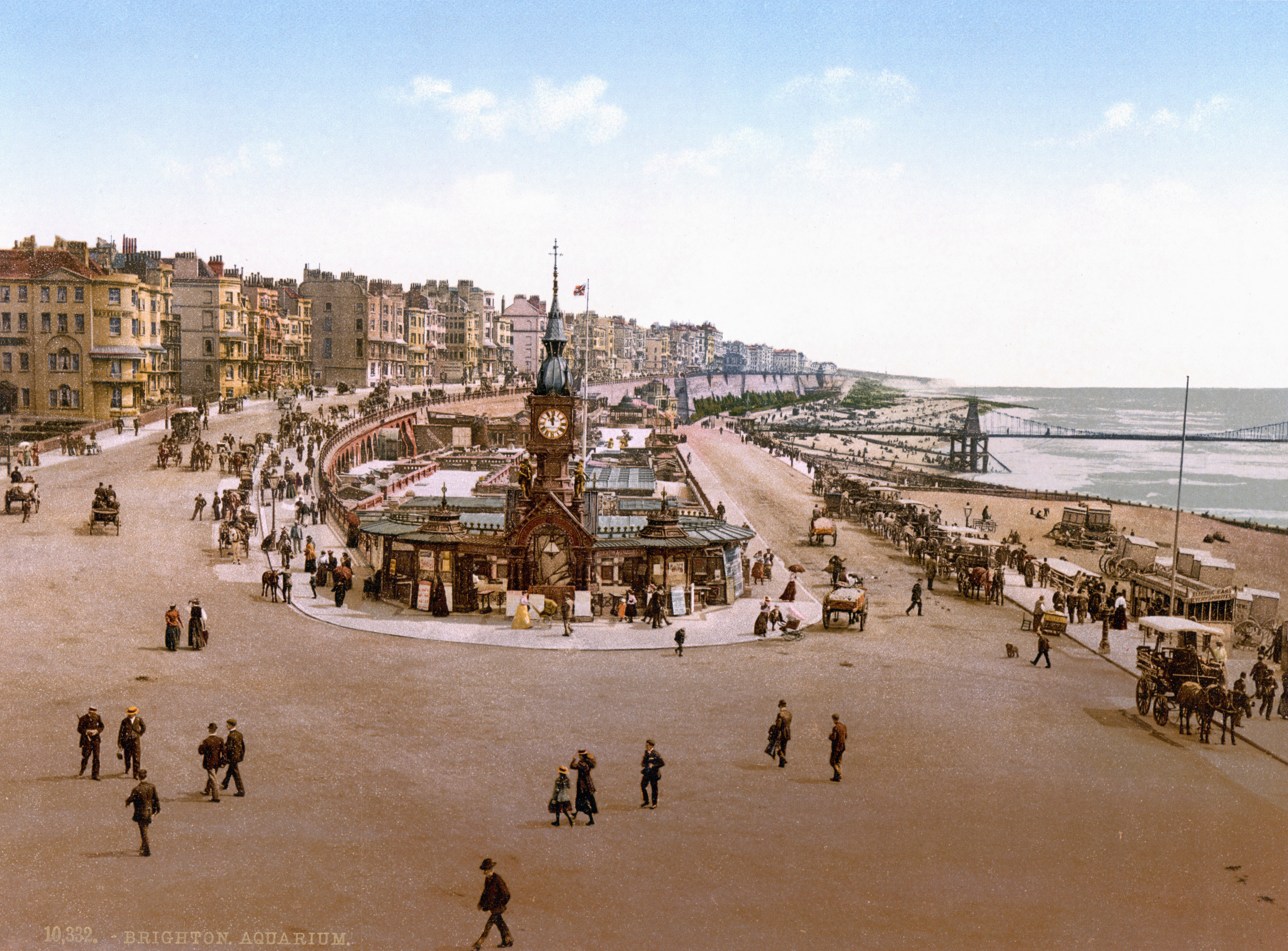
Brighton in the 1890s

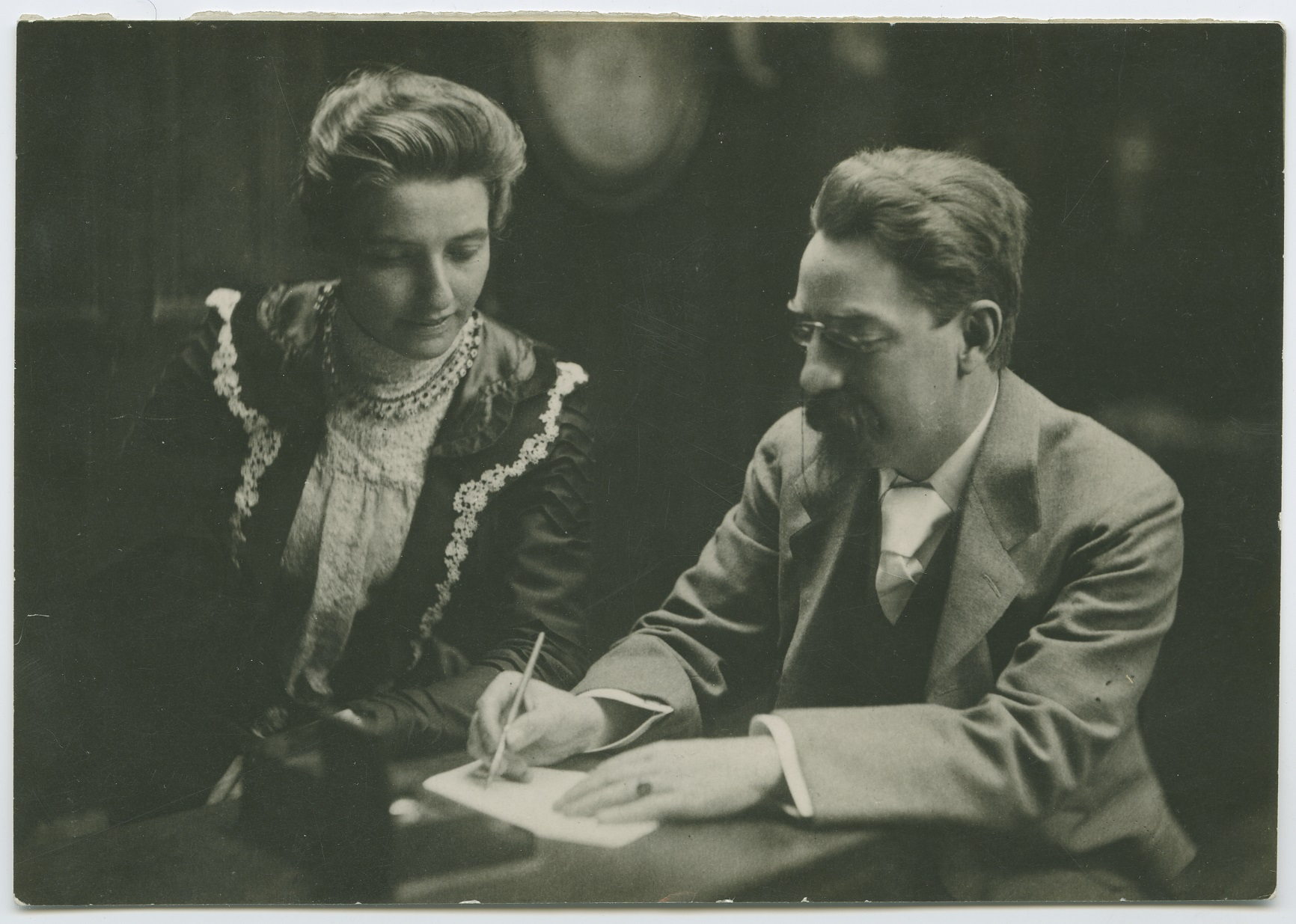
Beatrice and Sidney Webb, c. 1895; they were among Bondfield's early socialist acquaintances

Bondfield joined a drapery and embroidery business in Church Road, Hove, where the young apprentices were treated as family members. Relations between customers and assistants were cordial, and Bondfield's later recollections of this period were uniformly happy. Her apprenticeship complete, she worked as a living-in assistant in a succession of Brighton drapery stores, where she quickly encountered the realities of shop staff life: unsympathetic employers, very long hours, appalling living conditions and no privacy. Bondfield reported on her experiences of living-in: "Overcrowded, insanitary conditions, poor and insufficient food were the main characteristics of this system, with an undertone of danger ... In some houses both natural and unnatural vices found a breeding ground".

She found some relief from this environment when she was befriended by a wealthy customer, Louisa Martindale, and her daughter Hilda. The Martindales, socially conscious liberals and advocates for women's rights, found Bondfield a willing learner, and lent her books that began her lifelong interest in labour and social questions. Bondfield described Mrs Martindale as "a most vivid influence on my life ... she put me in the way of knowledge that has been of help to many score of my shop mates".

Bondfield's brother Frank had established himself in London some years earlier as a printer and trades unionist, and in 1894, having saved £5, she decided to join him. She found London shopworking conditions no better than in Brighton, but through Frank her social and political circles widened. She became an active member of the National Amalgamated Union of Shop Assistants, Warehousemen, and Clerks (NUSAWC), sometimes missing church on Sundays to attend union meetings. Her political and literary education was centred on the Ideal Club, where she met Bernard Shaw, and Sidney and Beatrice Webb. Under the influence of these socialist luminaries, she joined the Fabian Society and later the Independent Labour Party (ILP).

As a shopworker, Bondfield was expected to work between 80 and 100 hours a week for 51 weeks in the year, and might be sent out late at night to check that rival shops had closed before her employer would do so. (Note: In 1873 the Liberal MP Sir John Lubbock had introduced a parliamentary bill to limit shopworkers' hours to ten and a half per day. The House of Commons rejected the bill, on the grounds that unlike factory work, shopwork "could hardly be considered fatiguing, much less unwholesome".) She began to record her experiences, in a series of articles and stories that she wrote under the pseudonym "Grace Dare", for the shopworkers' monthly magazine The Shop Assistant. She wrote surreptitiously, at night: "I would light my half-penny dip [candle], hiding its glare by means of a towel and set to work on my monthly article".

In 1896, she was recruited by the Women's Industrial Council (WIC) as an undercover agent, working in various shops while secretly recording every aspect of shop life. Her accounts of squalor and exploitation were published in articles under the "Grace Dare" name, in both The Shop Assistant and the Daily Chronicle newspaper, and provided the basis for a WIC report on shopworkers' conditions published in 1898.

=== Union official ===
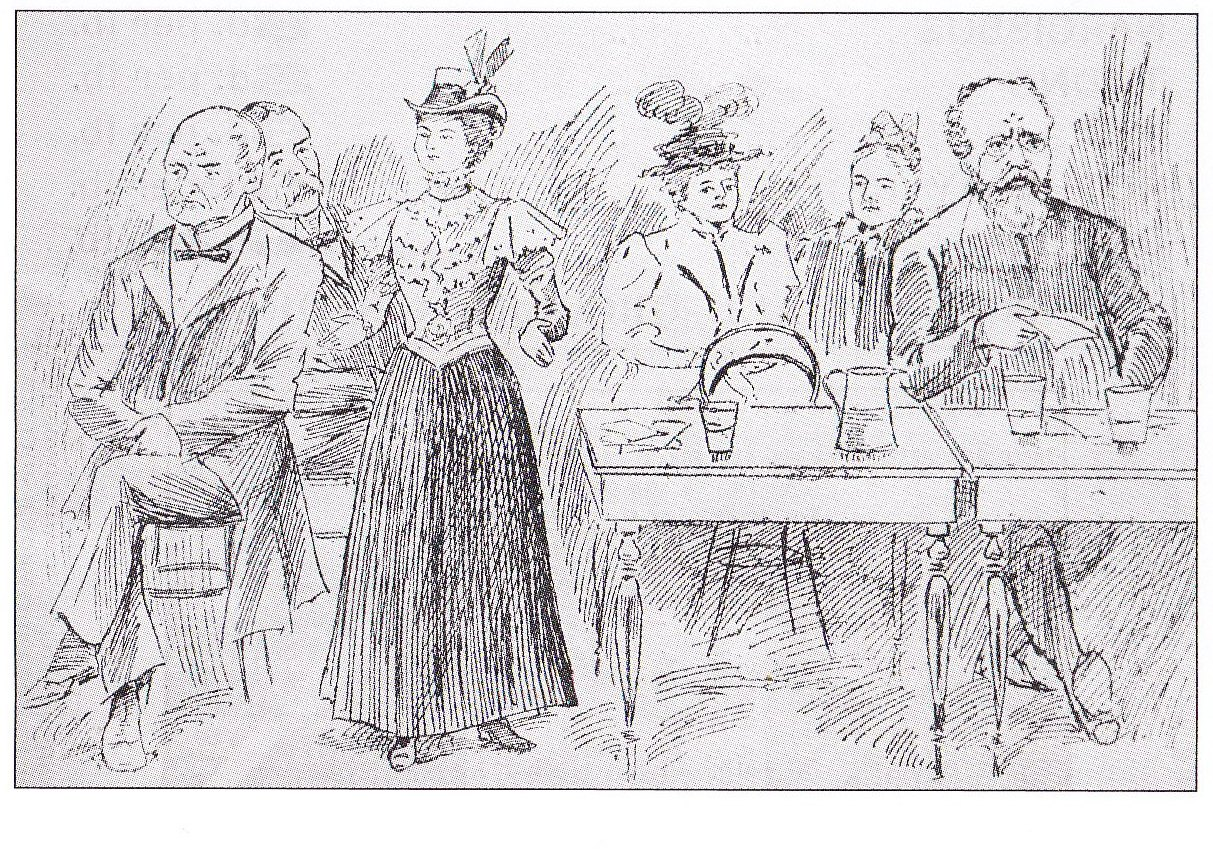
Cartoon showing Bondfield addressing a NAUSAWC recruitment meeting, July 1898

In 1898, Bondfield accepted the job of assistant secretary of NUSAWC, which that year became "NAUSAWC" after amalgamating with the United Shop Assistants' Union. From this time onward she subordinated her life to her union work and to the wider cause of socialism. She "had no vocation for wifehood or motherhood, but an urge to serve the Union ... I had 'the dear love of comrades' ". (Note: The quotation is from No. 24 of the Calamus poems, which form part of Walt Whitman's Leaves of Grass.) At the time the union's membership, at under 3,000, represented only a small fraction of shopworkers, and Bondfield gave priority to increasing this proportion. (Note: Cox and Hobley, in their history of "life behind the counter", give the union's membership at the time as 2,000; Frank Magill, in his Dictionary of World Biography, states a figure of 2,897.)

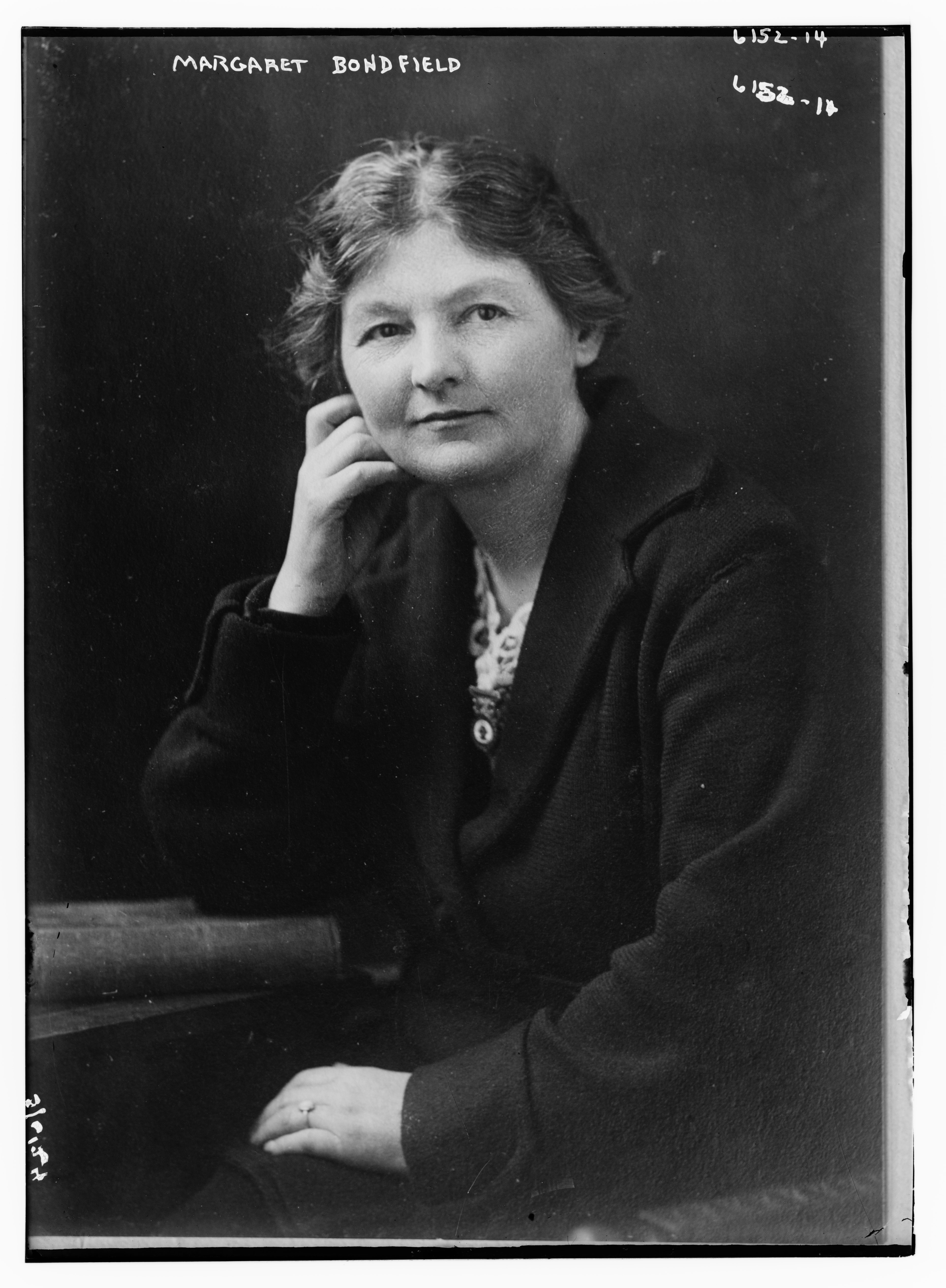
Bondfield in 1900

For months she travelled the country, distributing literature and arranging meetings when she could, with mixed outcomes in the face of apathy from shop staff, and outright opposition from shopowners. In Reading and Bristol she reported no success, although in Gloucester, she thought, "it should not be difficult to organise every shop worker". In 1899 Bondfield was the first woman delegate to the Trades Union Annual Congress, that year held in Plymouth, where she participated in the vote that led to the formation in 1900 of the Labour Representation Committee (LRC), forerunner of the Labour Party. NAUSAWC, its membership by then around 7,000, was one of the first unions to affiliate to the committee.

In 1902 Bondfield met Mary Macarthur, some eight years her junior, who chaired the Ayr branch of NAUSAWC. Macarthur, the daughter of a wealthy Scottish draper, had held staunchly Conservative views until a works meeting in 1901 to discuss the formation of a NAUSAWC branch transformed her into an ardent trades unionist.

In 1903, Macarthur moved to London where, with Bondfield's recommendation, she became secretary of the Women's Trade Union League. The two became close comrades-in-arms during the next two decades, in a range of causes affecting women. The historian Lise Sanders suggests that Bondfield's more intimate friendships tended to be with women rather than men; Bondfield's biographer Mary Hamilton described Macarthur as the romance of Bondfield's life.

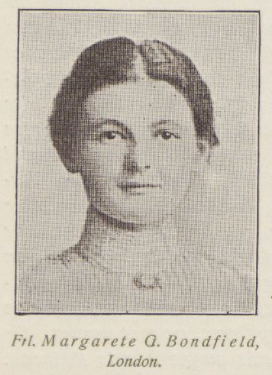
Bondfield in 1904

The Shop Hours Act 1904 made some provision for limiting shop opening hours. (Note: The Shop Hours Act 1904 gave local councils the power to fix trading hours, provided they could get the agreement of at least two-thirds of shopowners. Not until the Shops Act 1911 did it become a statutory requirement that shopworkers had a half-day's holiday each week.) In 1907, the first steps were taken to end the Victorian "living-in" practice, which at the time still affected two-thirds of Britain's 750,000 shopworkers. Initially, living-out privileges were only given to male employees; Bondfield campaigned for equivalent rights for women shop workers, arguing that if they were to become "useful, healthy ... wives and mothers", they needed to live "rational lives". As part of her campaign, Bondfield advised the playwright Cicely Hamilton, whose shop-based drama Diana of Dobsons appeared that year. Bondfield described the opening scene, set in a dreary, comfortless women's dormitory over a shop, as very like the real thing.

From 1904 onwards, Bondfield was increasingly occupied with the issue of women's suffrage. In that year she travelled with Dora Montefiore of the Women's Social and Political Union (WSPU) to the International Congress of Women in Berlin, but she was not in sympathy with the main WSPU policy, which was to secure the vote for women on the same highly restricted basis that it was then given to men. This involved a property qualification, and thus largely excluded the working class. Bondfield saw no benefit in this policy to the women that she represented, and aligned herself with the Adult Suffrage Society (ASS), which campaigned for universal adult suffrage, men and women alike, regardless of property. In 1906, she became chairman of the society and supported the Franchise and Removal of Women's Disabilities bill, introduced to parliament by Sir Charles Dilke. This proposed full adult suffrage, and the right of women to become MPs. The bill was "talked out" in the House of Commons.

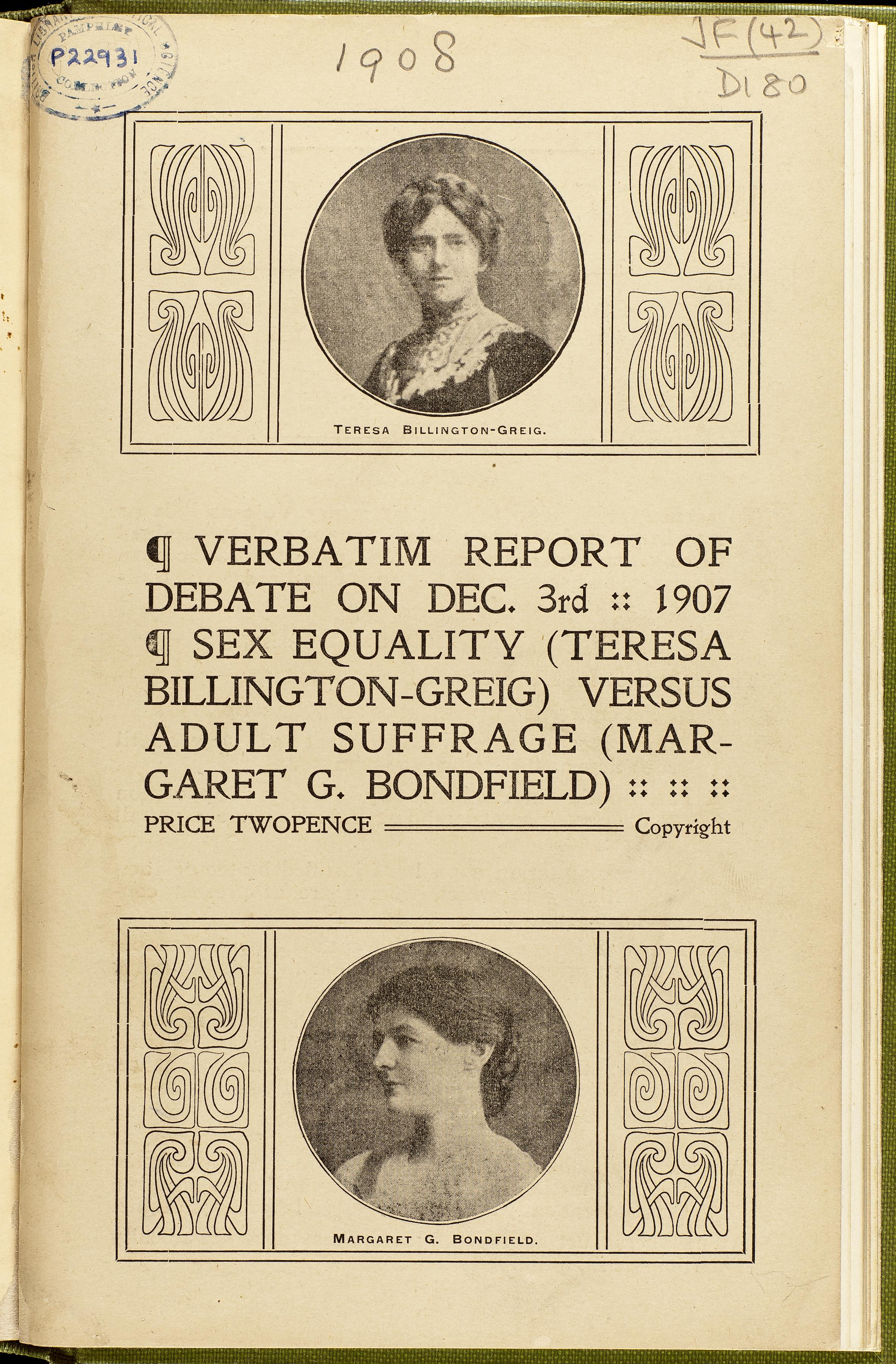
Report from the debate on suffrage and equality between Bondfield and Teresa Billington-Greig

In 1907, in the course of a public debate with Teresa Billington-Greig of the Women's Freedom League (WFL, a breakaway group from the WSPU), Bondfield argued that the only way forward was a bill that enfranchised all men and all women, without qualification. She wished good luck to those fighting for a "same terms as men" suffrage bill, but "don't let them come and tell me that they are working for my class". (Note: The Adult Suffrage Society was relaunched in 1909 as the People's Suffrage Federation (PSF), under the leadership of Margaret Llewellyn Davies.) The strains of her duties and constant campaigning began to undermine her health, and in 1908 she resigned her union post after ten years' service, during which NAUSAWC membership had risen to over 20,000. Her departure, she said, was "alike a grief and a deliverance". After the passing of the Representation of the People's Act 1918, giving some women the vote, Bondfield's answer to "Are Women MPs necessary?" was

We shall never reach a satisfactory State until we have the recognition of the citizen irrespective of sex.

== Women's Labour League ==
In view of the Reform Bill promised by the Government, this Conference demands that the inclusion of women [in the extended suffrage] shall ... become a vital part of the Government measure, and further declares that any attempt to exclude women will be met by the uncompromising opposition of organized Labour to the whole Bill.

— (WLL resolution to the Labour Party Conference, 1909. At the conference, Bondfield agreed to the deletion of the last four words.)

After leaving NAUSAWC, Bondfield transferred the main focus of her energies to the Women's Labour League (WLL), which she had helped to found in 1906. The League's principal aims were "to work for independent labour representation in connection with the Labour Party, and to obtain direct labour representation of women in Parliament and on all local bodies." The president of the League was Margaret MacDonald, wife of the future Labour Party leader Ramsay MacDonald; Bondfield had known the MacDonalds since the 1890s, through their joint work for the WIC.

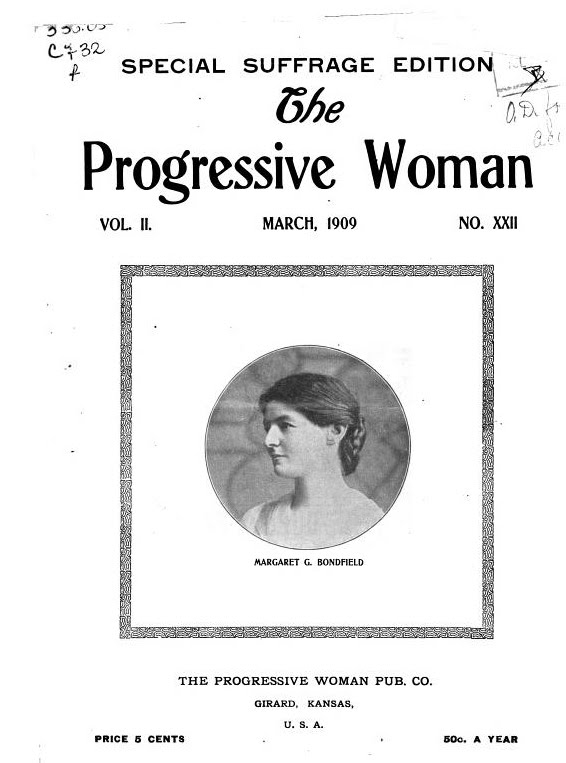
The Progressive Woman magazine cover from March 1909, featuring Bondfield

With a government suffrage reform bill pending in parliament, the WLL introduced a motion to the 1909 Labour Party conference committing the party to oppose any suffrage extension bill that did not specifically include women. However, while the party was largely sympathetic to the principle of women's suffrage, it was unwilling to risk losing the limited reforms to male suffrage promised by the government's bill. When Bondfield tabled the WLL motion at the Labour conference, she was persuaded by Arthur Henderson to water it down. Many suffragists reacted angrily; the WSPU accused the WLL, and Bondfield in particular, of treachery. Fran Abrams, in a biographical essay, wrote that although Bondfield "was prepared to argue loud and long for adult suffrage ... she was not prepared to damage her relationship with the Labour Party for it".

Since the passing of the Qualification of Women Act in 1907, women had been eligible to vote in and stand as candidates in municipal elections. Several WLL members contested the London County Council elections in 1910; Bondfield stood in Woolwich, unsuccessfully (she contested the same seat in 1913, with a similar result). The League was active in all types of elections, supporting and canvassing for candidates of either sex who spoke out for women's rights. Through these activities Bondfield experienced the lives of the poorest of families, writing: "Oh! the lonely lives of these women, hidden away at the back of a network of small, mean streets!"

Alongside her WLL duties, Bondfield maintained a range of other involvements. She spent part of 1910 in the United States, lecturing on suffrage issues with Maud Ward of the People's Suffrage Federation (PSF), and studying labour problems. At home, she worked with the Women's Co-operative Guild (WCG) on maternity and child welfare, and was co-opted to the Parliamentary Standing Committee that piloted the introduction of state maternity benefits and other assistance to mothers. Her investigation on behalf of the WIC into the working conditions in the textile industries led her to join most of the Labour leadership in a "War against Poverty" campaign. In 1910, Bondfield accepted the chairmanship of the British section of the Women's International Council of Socialist and Labour Organisations.

Between 1908 and 1910 the WLL and the WIC co-operated in a nationwide investigation of married women's working conditions. Bondfield carried out the fieldwork in Yorkshire. The relationship between the two bodies was sometimes fractious, and when the report was due to be published, there were disagreements over how it should be handled. As a result of these and other clashes, Bondfield, MacDonald and the other League women resigned from the council. In 1911 Bondfield assumed the role of the WLL's Organising Secretary, and spent much of the year travelling: she formed a WLL branch in Ogmore Vale, Glamorgan, reformed the Manchester branch, and found time to advise laundrywomen engaged in a dispute in South Wales.

The sudden death of Mary MacDonald in September 1911 added considerably to Bondfield's workload; the strain, together with internal animosities within the WLL, led her to resign her position in January 1912. The League made strenuous efforts to retain her, and only in September did its committee reluctantly accept her departure. An attempt to re-engage her in 1913 was unsuccessful, and Marion Phillips was appointed to succeed her. (Note: The WLL continued until 1918, when it evolved into the Women's Section of the Labour Party.)

== Campaigns and war ==
From 1912 Bondfield was a member of the WCG's Citizenship Subcommittee, where she worked with Margaret Llewelyn Davies investigating minimum wage rates, infant mortality and child welfare. She also assisted the Guild's education and training programme, lecturing on "Local Government in Relation to Maternity". Freedom from her WLL responsibilities gave her more time for political work, and in 1913 she joined the ILP's National Administration Council.

Bondfield spoke at the ILP's mass anti-war rally in Trafalgar Square on 2 August 1914, organised by George Lansbury; other speakers included Keir Hardie, Henderson, and the dockers' leader Ben Tillett. On the outbreak of war a few days later, Bondfield joined the Union of Democratic Control that, while not pacifist, opposed the use of war as an instrument of national policy. She was a member of the Women's Peace Council. In March 1915 she attended a conference in Bern, Switzerland, organised by the Women's International of Socialist and Labour Organizations, which called for a negotiated peace. Later in the war the government, concerned by Bondfield's association with peace organisations, prevented her from travelling to similar gatherings in Sweden and the United States.

Bondfield had helped Mary Macarthur to found the National Federation of Women Workers (NFWW) in 1906. This organisation was dedicated to the unionisation of women, and by 1914 had more than 20,000 members. In 1915 Bondfield became NFWW's organising secretary. Together with Macarthur, Phillips and Susan Lawrence, she established the Central Committee for Women's Employment, which organised relief work for the female unemployed. Bondfield's investigations into workers' pay revealed considerable differences between the rates paid to men and to women, even for identical work. (Note: In 1916 women in government offices were paid between 18 and 21 shillings a week as against their male counterparts' 35 shillings; women post office workers received 25s, men 35s for the same work; women in factories worked alongside men and received less than half the male hourly rate.) Through the NFWW she campaigned for a £1 a week starting minimum wage for women, whatever the nature of the work, and for equal pay with men for equal work.

Suffragist militancy having largely lapsed after the outbreak of the First World War, in October 1916 a Speaker's Conference (Note: The Speaker's Conference is an inter-party parliamentary mechanism that deals with electoral law and electoral reform. The 1916 conference was the first use of the mechanism.) was convened to consider the issue of women's franchise and make proposals for postwar legislation. While Bondfield, Lansbury and other prewar campaigners pressed for universal adult suffrage, the conference recommended only a limited extension of the franchise. The subsequent Representation of the People Act, 1918, gave the vote to women over 30 who were property owners or the wives of property owners, or were university graduates. Bondfield described the Act, which excluded almost all working-class women, as "mean and inadequate ... creating fresh anomalies".

== National prominence ==
The end of the war in November 1918 saw Bondfield's election to the General Council of the TUC, the first woman to be thus elevated. In the following months she travelled as a TUC delegate to international conferences, in Bern and later in Washington DC, where she expressed the view that the peace terms being imposed on Germany were unjust. In April 1920, she was a member of a joint TUC-Labour Party mission to the Soviet Union. (Note: The members of the mission were: from the Labour Party, Ben Turner, Ethel Snowden, Tom Shaw and Robert Williams; from the TUC, Margaret Bondfield, A. A. Purcell and H Skinner; from the ILP Clifford Allen and R. C. Wallhead. The joint secretaries to the mission were Leslie Haden-Guest and Charles Roden Buxton. Bertrand Russell accompanied the party in a private capacity.) A few months earlier, Lansbury had visited the incipient Soviet state and had been most impressed after meeting Lenin, whom he judged to be "symbolic of a new spirit", "the father of his people" and "their champion in the cause of social and economic freedom". Bondfield, who also met Lenin, was more cautious. She told an NFWW conference on her return that if she were a Russian citizen she would support the Bolshevist government as currently "the only possible form of administration". Later, she came to see communism as anti-democratic and dictatorial, and voted against the application of the British Communist Party for affiliation to the Labour Party.

Among various public activities, Bondfield joined the governing body of Ruskin College, the Oxford-based institution founded in 1899 to provide higher education opportunities to working-class men. She also became a Justice of the Peace. She first sought election to parliament in 1920, as the Labour candidate in a by-election in Northampton. She increased the Labour vote significantly, but lost by 3,371 votes, to the Coalition Liberal candidate, Charles McCurdy.

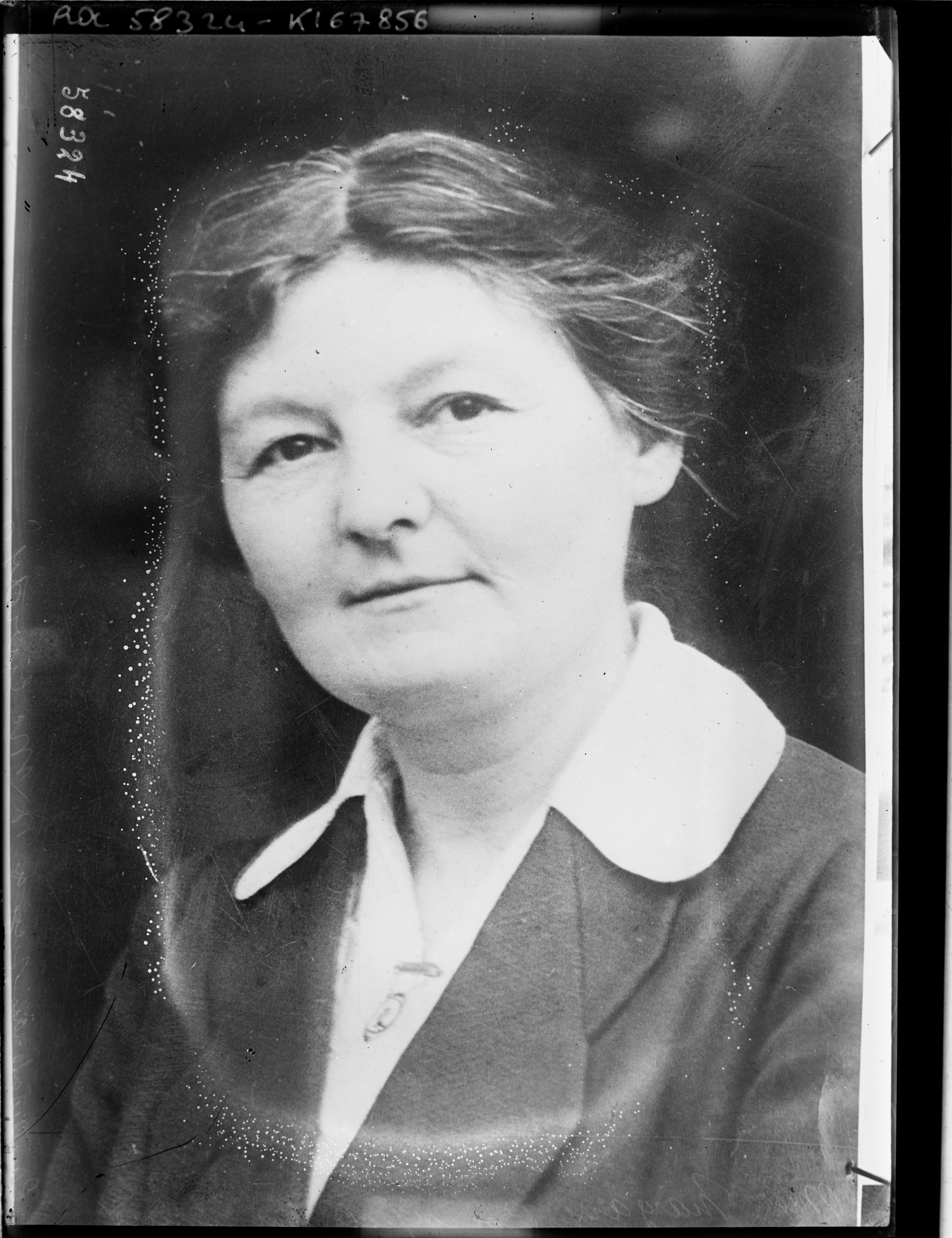
Bondfield in 1920

At the general election of 1922 Bondfield was again adopted by Labour at Northampton and, as she had at Woolwich in 1913, turned to Shaw for help in the campaign. He was contemptuous of the Labour leadership for not arranging a more promising seat; nevertheless, he came and spoke for her, but her margin of defeat widened to 5,476. (Note: After Bondfield's death in 1953, an anonymous Manchester Guardian correspondent conjectured that she was the inspiration behind Shaw's portrayal of the "Powermistress General" in his play The Apple Cart.)

Following two years of negotiation, in 1920 the NFWW voted to merge with the National Union of General Workers and become that union's Women's Section. Bondfield, who supported the merger, believed that provided women could maintain their separate group identity, it was better for men and women to work together. The secretary of the new section was to have been Mary Macarthur, but she died of cancer on 1 January 1921, the date that the merger came into effect. Bondfield was appointed in her place, and remained in the post (with leave of absence while holding ministerial office) until 1938. To honour her friend, Bondfield helped to organise the Mary Macarthur Memorial Fund. She added other responsibilities to her heavy schedule: chairing the Standing Joint Committee of Industrial Women's Organisations (SJCIWO), membership of the Labour Party's Emergency Committee on Unemployment, and chairman of the 1922 Conference of Unemployed Women. In September 1923, she became the first woman to assume the chair of the TUC's General Council.

Hoping to win a mandate for tariffs on imported goods, the Conservative Prime Minister Stanley Baldwin called a general election in December 1923. Bondfield was elected in Northampton with a majority of 4,306 over her Conservative opponent. She was one of the first three women—Susan Lawrence and Dorothy Jewson were the others—to be elected as Labour MPs. In an outburst of local celebration her supporters, whom she described as "nearly crazy with joy", paraded her around the town in a charabanc. The Labour Party had won 191 seats to the Conservatives' 258 and the Liberals' 158; with no party in possession of a parliamentary majority, the make-up of the next government was in doubt for several weeks.

== Parliament and office ==
=== First Labour Government ===
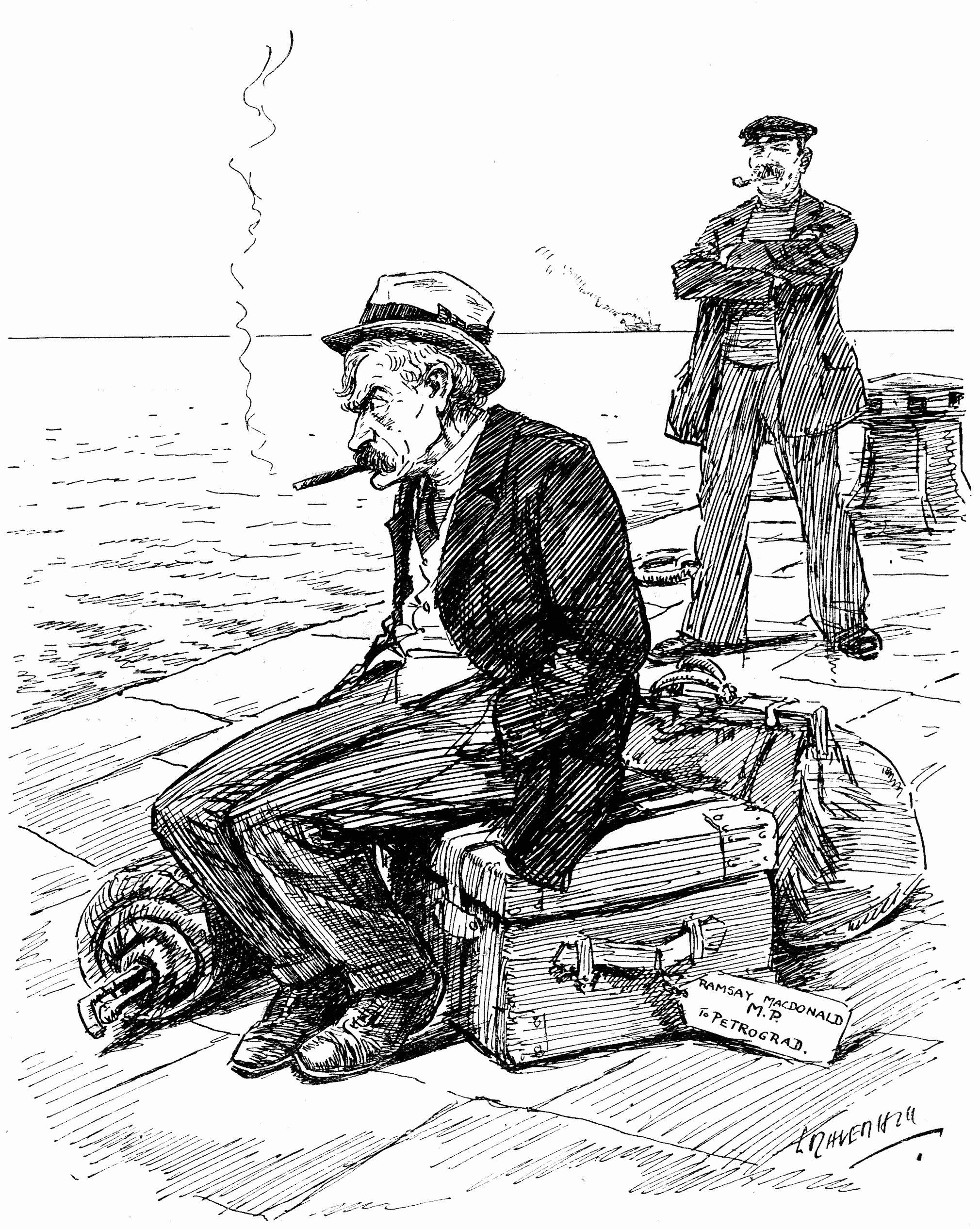
The Labour leader Ramsay MacDonald, depicted in a hostile Punch cartoon. The luggage label, marked "Petrograd", links him to Russia and communism

The Liberal Party's decision not to enter a coalition with the Conservatives, and Baldwin's unwillingness to govern without a majority, led to Ramsay MacDonald's first minority Labour government which took office in January 1924. According to Lansbury's biographer, Bondfield turned down the offer of a cabinet post; instead, she became parliamentary secretary to the Minister of Labour, Tom Shaw. This appointment meant that she had to give up the TUC Council chair; her decision to do so, immediately after becoming the first woman to achieve this honour, generated some criticism from other trade unionists.

Bondfield later described her first months in government as "a strange adventure". The difficulties of the economic situation would have created problems for the most experienced of governments, and the fledgling Labour administration was quickly in difficulties.

Bondfield spent much of her time abroad; in the autumn she travelled to Canada as the head of a delegation examining the problems of British immigrants, especially as related to the welfare of young children. When she returned to Britain in early October she found the government in its final throes. On 8 October, MacDonald resigned after losing a confidence vote in the House of Commons. Labour's chances of victory in the ensuing general election were fatally compromised by the controversy surrounding the so-called Zinoviev letter, a missive purportedly sent by Grigory Zinoviev, president of the Communist International, which called on Britain's socialists to prepare for violent revolution. The letter, published four days before polling day, generated a "Red Scare" that led to a significant swing of voters to the right, and ensured a massive Conservative victory. (Note: The Conservative victory resulted from the collapse of the Liberal vote; Labour obtained a million more votes than in 1923, and its share of the poll likewise increased.) Bondfield lost her seat in Northampton by 971 votes.

=== Opposition ===
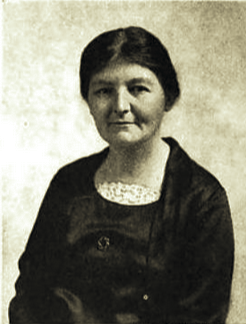
Image of Bondfield from American journal The Woman Citizen, February 1927

After her defeat, Bondfield resumed her work for NUGMW and was re-elected to the TUC Council. In 1926 she supported the TUC's decision to hold a General Strike, and also the decision to call it off after nine days. Following the resignation of Sir Patrick Hastings in June 1926, Bondfield was adopted as the Labour candidate at Wallsend, and won the subsequent by-election with a majority of over 9,000. Meanwhile, she had accepted appointment to the Blanesburgh Committee, which the Conservative government had set up to consider reforms to the system of unemployment benefit. Her private view, that entitlement to benefits should be related to contributions, was not widely shared in the Labour Party or the TUC. When the committee made recommendations along these lines she signed the report, which became the basis of the Unemployment Insurance Act 1927. Bondfield's association with this legislation permanently shadowed her relationship with the Labour movement.

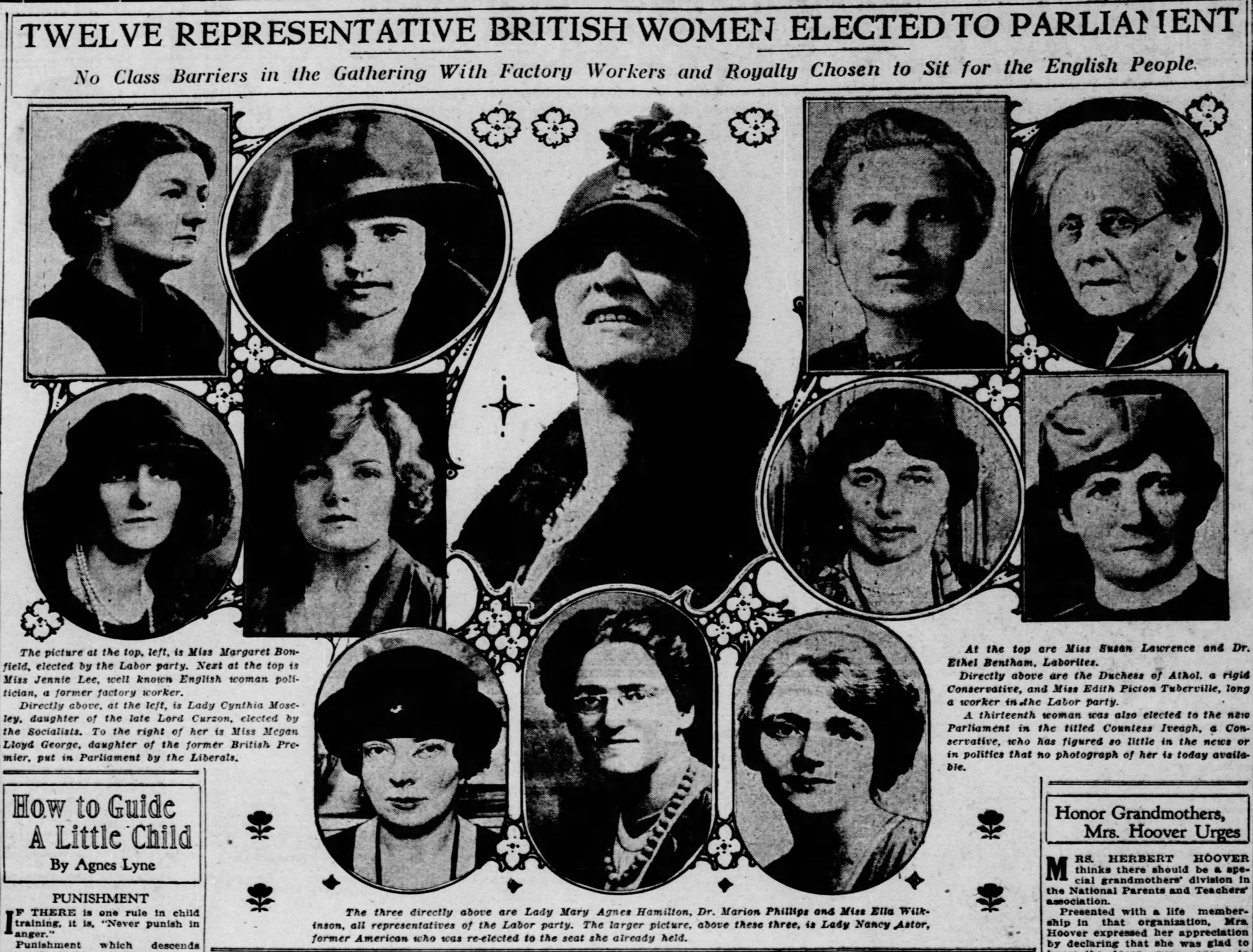
Twelve Representative British Women Elected To Parliament, 1929

On 29 March 1928, when a bill came before parliament giving the vote in parliamentary elections to all men and women over 21, she termed the measure "a tremendous social advance", and added: "At last [women] are established on that equitable footing because we are human beings and part of society as a whole ... once and for all, we shall destroy the artificial barrier in the way of any women who want to get education in politics and who want to come forward and take their full share in the political life of their day". The bill passed into law as the Representation of the People (Equal Franchise) Act 1928, adding 4 million voters, most of them women, to the register. In the 1929 general election, held on 30 May, Bondfield easily held her Wallsend seat despite the intervention of a candidate representing unemployed workers. The overall election result left Labour as the largest party with 287 seats, but without an overall majority, and MacDonald formed his second minority administration.

=== Minister of Labour ===
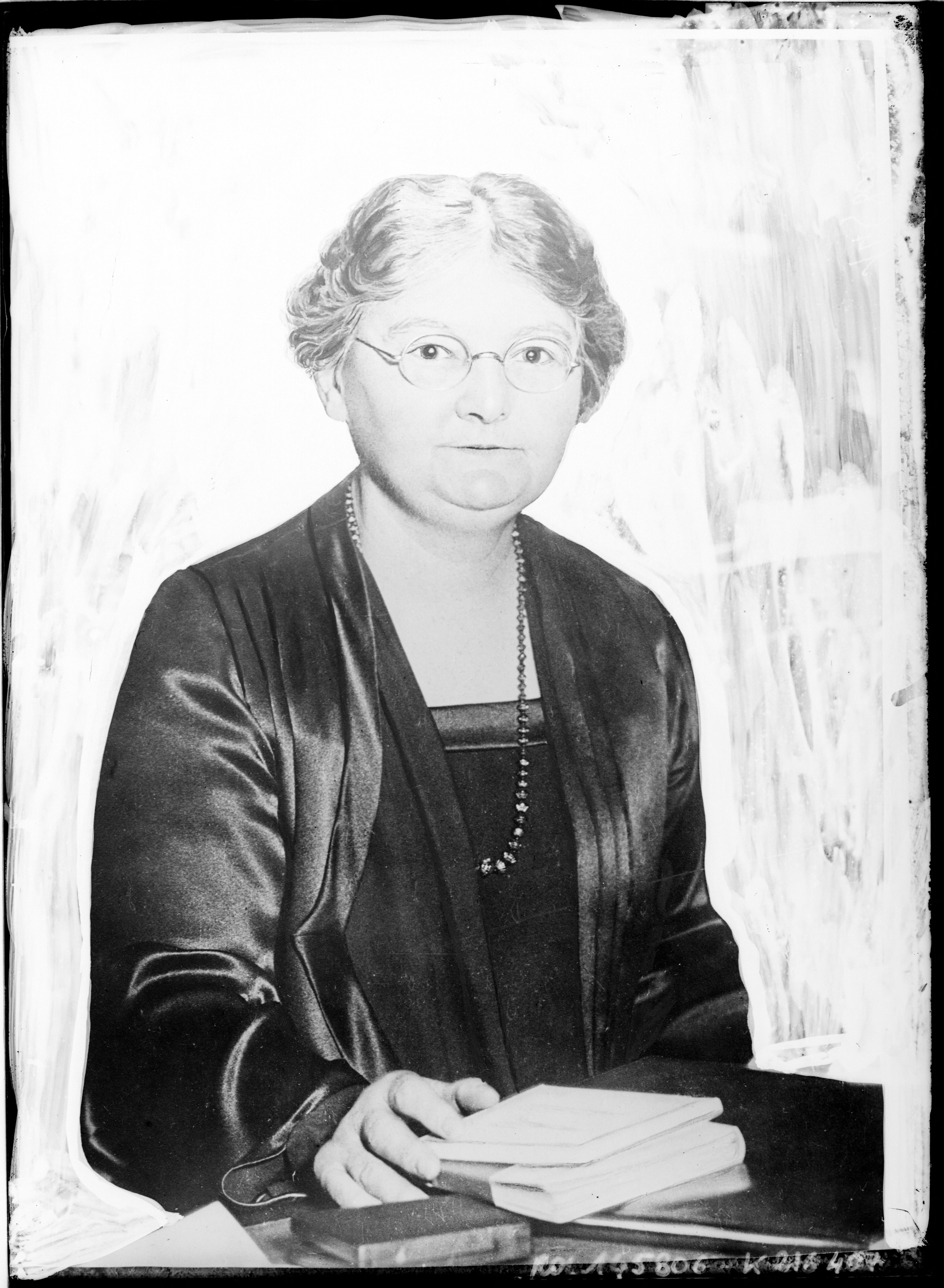
Bondfield in May 1930

When Bondfield accepted the post of Minister of Labour in the new government, she became Britain's first woman cabinet minister, and Britain's first woman privy counsellor. She considered the appointment "part of the great revolution in the position of women". Her period in office was dominated by the issue of rising unemployment and the consequent increasing costs of benefit, which created a division between the government, anxious to demonstrate its financial responsibility, and the wider Labour movement whose priority was to protect the unemployed. According to the historian Robert Skidelsky: "Ministers worried about the finances of the [unemployment] fund; backbenchers worried about the finances of the unemployed". Under increasing pressure from the TUC, Bondfield introduced the Unemployment Insurance Bill of 1929. The bill reversed the "Blanesburgh" restrictions on unemployment benefit introduced by the previous government, but with visible reluctance. Her handling of this issue is described by Marquand as "maladroit", and by Skidelsky as showing "monumental tactlessness".

As the cost of unemployment benefits mounted, Bondfield's attempts to control the fund's deficit provoked further hostility from the TUC and political attacks from the opposition parties. In February 1931 she proposed a scheme to cut benefit and restrict entitlement, but this was rejected by the cabinet as too harsh. Instead, seeking a cross-party solution, the government accepted a Liberal proposal for an independent committee, eventually set up under Sir George May, to report on how public expenditure might be reduced. With the collapse in May 1931 of Austria's leading private bank, Kreditanstalt, and the subsequent failure of several other European banks, the sense of crisis deepened. On 30 July, the May committee recommended cuts in expenditure of £97 million, the majority (£67 million) to be found from reductions in unemployment costs. In the ensuing weeks, ministers struggled vainly to meet these demands. Bondfield was prepared to cut general unemployment benefit, provided the most needy recipients—those on so-called "transitional benefit"—were protected. No formula could be found; by 23 August the cabinet was hopelessly split, and resigned the next day. To the outrage of the TUC and most of the Labour Party, MacDonald formed an emergency National Government with the Conservative and Liberal parties, while the bulk of the Labour Party went into opposition.

Bondfield did not join the small number of Labour MPs who chose to follow MacDonald, although she expressed her "deep sympathy and admiration" for his actions. In the general election that followed on 27 October 1931, the Labour Party lost more than three-quarters of its Commons seats and was reduced to 52 members. Bondfield was defeated in Wallsend by 7,606 votes; Abrams observes that given the attacks on her from both right and left, "it would have been a miracle had she been re-elected". Of the former Labour cabinet members who opposed the National Government, only Lansbury kept his seat.

== Later career ==
After her defeat, Bondfield returned to her NUGMW post. The TUC, suspicious of her perceived closeness to MacDonald, was cool towards her and she was not re-elected to the General Council. She remained Labour's candidate at Wallsend; in the general election of 1935 she was again defeated. She never returned to parliament; she was adopted as the prospective Labour candidate for Reading, but when it became obvious that the election due for 1940 would be delayed indefinitely by war, she resigned her candidacy.

In 1938, after retiring from her NUGMW post, Bondfield founded the Women's Group on Public Welfare. She studied labour conditions in the United States and Mexico during 1938, and toured the US and Canada after the outbreak of war in 1939, as a lecturer for the British Information Services. Her attitude towards the war was different from her semi-pacifist stance of 1914; she actively supported the government and, in 1941, published a booklet, Why Labour Fights. Her main wartime activity was leading an investigation by the Hygiene Committee of the Women's Group on Public Welfare, into the problems that arose from the large-scale evacuation into the countryside of city children. The group's findings were published in 1943, as Our Towns: a Close-up; the report gave many people their first understanding of the extent of inner-city poverty.

Suggested solutions included nursery education, a minimum wage, child allowances and a national health service. The report was reprinted several times, and was instrumental in developing support for the social reforms introduced by the Labour government that took office in 1945. Among Bondfield's other wartime activities, in 1944 she helped to launch a national drive for the appointment of more women police officers.

== Last years, retirement and death ==
Although not a candidate herself, Bondfield campaigned for Labour in the general election of July 1945—a reporter found her instructing a meeting in Bury St Edmunds on the benefits of nationalisation. She was active in her local Labour Party, and continued to chair the Women's Group of Public Welfare until 1948. (Note: After the war the Group changed its name to "Women's Forum", and continued until 1980 when it closed through lack of funding.) Her main task in these years was her autobiography, published in 1948 under the title A Life's Work. The purpose of the book, she wrote, was not to celebrate her own achievements, instead she hoped that her experiences "may be of some service to the younger generation". The book had an indifferent reception; in The Observer, Harold Nicolson described it as "ill composed and badly proportioned", with too much space devoted to inconsequential meetings while truly important events were hurried over. Nevertheless, he thought the book provided "a fine example of resolute and in the end triumphant energy". The Manchester Guardian's reviewer also criticised the work's confused structure and unselective detail, but found it "a useful, direct and honest" account of Labour's early years.

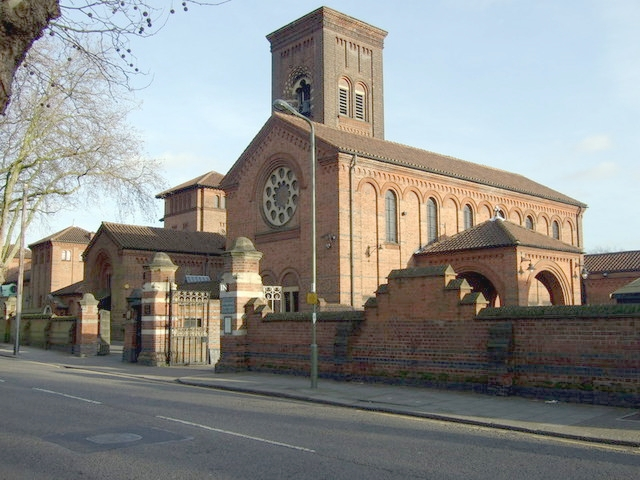
Golders Green Crematorium

Apart from her autobiography, Bondfield contributed to a collection of essays entitled What Life Has Taught Me, in which 25 public figures pondered on the lessons of life. Bondfield wrote that her religious convictions gave her "strength to meet defeat with a smile, to face success with a sense of responsibility; to be willing to do one's best without hope of reward [and] to bear misrepresentation without giving way to futile bitterness".

In March 1948, Bondfield opened the Mary Macarthur Home at Poulton-le-Fylde, near Blackpool in Lancashire, which provided subsidised holidays for low-paid women workers. In 1949, she made a six-month speaking tour of the United States, her final visit to the country; she left convinced that America would soon adopt a national health service.

Bondfield, who never married, maintained her good health and interest in life until her final illness in 1953. She moved to a nursing home in Sanderstead, Surrey, where she died, aged 80, on 16 June 1953. At her cremation in Golders Green Crematorium the congregation sang the popular hymn "To Be a Pilgrim". The Labour Party was fully represented; Clement Attlee, then-Leader of the Labour Party and former UK Prime Minister, gave the address.

== Appraisal and legacy ==
In his biographical sketch for the Oxford Dictionary of National Biography, Philip Williamson depicts Bondfield as "physically short and stout ... with sparkling eyes, a firm, brisk manner, and effective, sometimes inspired, public speaking". She had the self-confidence to exist and thrive in a male-dominated world, deriving inspiration from a childhood that, though materially impoverished, her obituarist has described as "of great spiritual and mental wealth". She inherited a strong nonconformist faith, which became a key element throughout her later career, and retained her links with the Congregational Church throughout her life. After her death The Times praised her "unusually wide human sympathies ... her generous nature and real sense of humour". Skidelsky, however, describes her unsympathetically as "a humourless and somewhat priggish person, with long black skirts and a voice that emitted a harsh cascade of sound". A more recent and sympathetic account of her life by Tony Judge sets her career more in the context of her championing of women's political and workplace rights, and her role in the 1931 crisis more as a hapless victim of MacDonald's machinations.

Bondfield's career was punctuated by "firsts", in union, parliament and government spheres. Her own view of these achievements was modest: "Some woman was bound to be first. That I should be was the accident of dates and events". Her appointment as Minister of Labour propelled her into what was, in 1929, the hardest job in the cabinet, and in common with other ministers, her lack of experience in government left her heavily dependent on her official advisers. By temperament a realist, she based her actions in government on economic facts rather on party or sectional interests; thus she became "caught between the opposition claims that she was soft on the unemployed, and her own backbenchers' jibe that she had abandoned the workers". Her stance, and her seemingly equivocal attitude towards MacDonald's apostasy, reduced her standing in her own party for decades, so that when Barbara Castle was appointed as Minister of Labour by Harold Wilson in 1968, she insisted that the ministry's name be changed to "Department of Employment", for fear of association with Bondfield's term in office. Castle refused to contribute a preface to a Fabian Society booklet celebrating Bondfield's life, because she considered her predecessor's actions close to political betrayal. In 2001, a speech by Tony Blair celebrating the Labour Party's 100 years in parliament paid tributes to many heroes of the movement's early years; Bondfield's name was not mentioned.

Bondfield was awarded an honorary Doctor of Laws degree by the University of Bristol, and in 1930 received the freedom of the borough from her home town of Chard, where in 2011 a plaque in her honour was fixed to the Guildhall wall. In 1948 she was appointed a Member of the Order of the Companions of Honour (CH). Many years after her death, streets and apartment buildings were named after her in the London boroughs of Tower Hamlets, Barking; and Islington (where a small block of flats was built to replace the house lived in by Dr H. H. Crippen, which was destroyed by a German bomb in 1940). She was further commemorated in her old constituency of Northampton when a hall of residence at Nene College was named Margaret Bondfield Hall.

To mark Bondfield's centenary in 1973, Linda Christmas in The Guardian reviewed the progress of women in parliament since the 1930s. By 1973, Christmas reported, only 93 women had sat in parliament; their contributions had overall "not been stunning". Their best numerical representation at that point had been in the 1966 general election, when 29 women (out of 630 MPs) had been elected. The 1979 election saw this number fall to 19, but also saw Margaret Thatcher become Britain's first woman prime minister. (Note: After 1979 the numbers of elected women rose at successive general elections, reaching 120 in 1997 and 208 in 2017.) Cox and Hobley draw attention to Thatcher's early life as a shopkeeper's daughter, and contrast her account of those days with Bondfield's experiences half a century earlier. Thatcher believed that the concept of service to the customer was absolute; thus, Cox and Hobley assert, she would have had little sympathy for Bondfield's campaigns to better shopworkers' conditions. Despite the changes that have taken place in the retail industry since Bondfield's day, Cox and Hobley believe that, were she alive, "she'd still be champing at the bit, trying to coax shop assistants to join a union, and fiercely championing shopworkers' rights to better pay and conditions".

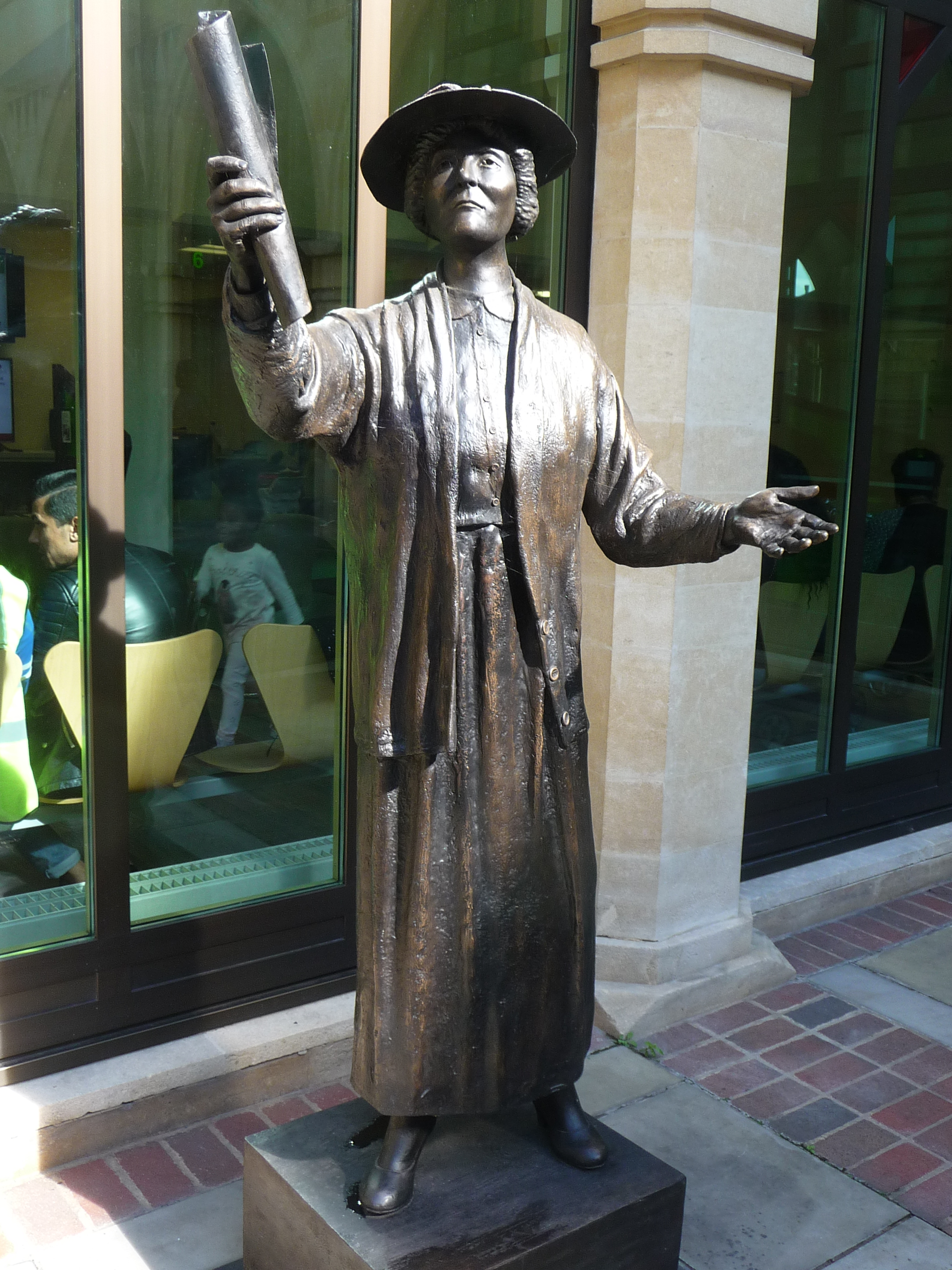
Statue of Bondfield in Northampton

In 2014 a campaign began for a plaque on the shop in Church Street, Hove, where in 1886–87 Bondfield had served her apprenticeship. A sculpture of Bondfield has been unveiled in Northampton.

== Writings ==
Bondfield was a prolific writer of magazine and newspaper articles. Her main publications are listed below:

=== Books ===
- A Life's Work (autobiography). London: Hutchinsons, 1948. OCLC 577150779.
- What Life Has Taught Me (contributor with 27 others). London: Odhams Press, 1948. OCLC 222888739.

=== Booklets and pamphlets ===
- Socialism for Shop Assistants (in "Pass On Pamphlets" series). London, Clarion Press, 1909. OCLC 40624464.
- Shop Workers and the Vote (co-author with Kathryn Oliver). London: People's Suffrage Federation, 1911. OCLC 26958055
- The National Care of Maternity. London: Women's Co-operative Guild, 1914. OCLC 81111433.
- Labour and the League of Nations (co-author with J. Ramsay MacDonald and Arthur Pugh). Bondfield's chapter: "Great Britain's Responsibility". London: League of Nations Union, 1926. OCLC 561089187
- The Meaning of Trade. London: E. Benn Ltd, 1928. OCLC 56418171.
- Why Labour Fights. London, 1941. OCLC 44515437.
- Our Towns: A Close-up (with the Hygiene Committee of the Women's Group on Public Welfare). Oxford University Press, 1943. OCLC 750462348.

== Notes and references ==
=== Sources ===
- Abrams, Fran (2003). Freedom's Cause: Lives of the Suffragettes. London: Profile Books. ISBN 1-86197-425-6.
- Biagini, Eugenio F.; Reid, Alastair J., eds. (1991). Currents of Radicalism: Popular Radicalism, Organised Labour and Party. Cambridge: Cambridge University Press. ISBN 0-521-39455-4.
- Blythe, Ronald (1964). The Age of Illusion. Harmondsworth: Penguin Books. OCLC 493484388.
- Bondfield, Margaret (1948). A Life's Work. London: Hutchinson. OCLC 5712024.
- Boucher, Ellen (2014). Empire's Children: Child Emigration, Welfare, and the Decline of the British World, 1869–1967. Cambridge: Cambridge University Press. ISBN 978-1-107-04138-7.
- Collette, Christine (1989). For Labour and for Women: The Women's Labour League 1906–18. Manchester: Manchester University Press. ISBN 0-7190-2591-5.
- Cox, Pamela; Hobley, Annabel (2014). Shopgirls: The True Story of Life Behind the Counter. London: Hutchinson. ISBN 978-0-09-195446-8.
- Hamilton, Mary Agnes (1924). Margaret Bondfield. London: L. Parsons. OCLC 300744813.
- Holton, Sandra Stanley (1986). Feminism and Democracy: Women's Suffrage and Reform Politics in Britain, 1900–1918. Cambridge: Cambridge University Press. ISBN 0-521-32855-1.
- Hunt, Cathy (2014). The National Federation of Women Workers, 1906–1921. London: Palgrave Macmillan. ISBN 978-1-137-03353-6.
- Judge, Tony (2018) Margaret Bondfield: First Woman in the Cabinet London: Alpha House ISBN 978-1983500985
- Law, Cheryl (2000). Women: A Modern Political Dictionary. London: IB. Tauris. ISBN 1-86064-502-X.
- Magill, Frank N., ed. (1999). Dictionary of World Biography, Vol. VII: The 20th Century (A–G). Abingdon: Routledge. ISBN 0-89356-321-8.
- Marquand, David (1977). Ramsay MacDonald. London: Jonathan Cape. ISBN 0-224-01295-9.
- Martindale, Hilda (1944). From One Generation to Another, 1839–1944. London: George Allen & Unwin. OCLC 1296502.
- Pelling, Henry (1966). Origins of the Labour Party. Oxford: Oxford University Press. ISBN 0-19-881110-1.
- Sanders, Lise (2006). Consuming Fantasies: Labor, Leisure and the London Shopgirl. Columbus, Ohio: The Ohio State University Press. ISBN 0-8142-1017-1.
- Scott, Gillian (1998). Feminism and the Politics of Working Women. London: UCL Press. ISBN 1-85728-798-3.
- Skidelsky, Robert (1970). Politicians and the Slump: The Labour Government of 1929–31. Harmondsworth: Penguin Books. ISBN 978-0-14-021172-6.
- Wilson, A.N. (2006). After the Victorians. London: Arrow Books. ISBN 978-0-09-945187-7.
- Worley, Matthew, ed. (2009). The Foundations of the British Labour Party. Farnham, Surrey: Ashgate Publishing. ISBN 978-0-7546-6731-5.

Parliament of the United Kingdom
Preceded by Charles McCurdy	Member of Parliament for Northampton; 1923–1924	Succeeded by Arthur Holland
Preceded by Sir Patrick Hastings	Member of Parliament for Wallsend; 1926–1931	Succeeded by Irene Ward
Party political offices
Preceded by Mary Middleton	Secretary of the Women's Labour League; 1911–1912	Succeeded by Marion Phillips
Trade union offices
Preceded by Arthur Hayday and John Hill	Trades Union Congress representative to the American Federation of Labour; 1918–1919; With: Frederick Hall (1918); Samuel Finney (1919)	Succeeded by Jack Jones and J. W. Ogden
Preceded by New position	Women Workers member of the General Council of the Trades Union Congress; 1921–1923; With: Julia Varley	Succeeded by Mary Quaile and Julia Varley
Preceded by New position	Chief Woman Officer of the National Union of General and Municipal Workers; 1924–1938	Succeeded by Dorothy Elliott
Preceded by Mary Quaile and Julia Varley	Women Workers member of the General Council of the Trades Union Congress; 1925–1929; With: Mary Quaile (1925–1926); Julia Varley (1926–1929)	Succeeded by Anne Loughlin and Julia Varley
Political offices
Preceded by Sir Arthur Steel-Maitland	Minister of Labour; 1929–1931	Succeeded by Sir Henry Betterton
