= People's Suffrage Federation =

The People's Suffrage Federation (The PSF) was a British Adult Suffrage organisation. Led by the former Co-operative Women's Guild general secretary Margaret Llewelyn Davies, it was created in 1909 by a merger of the Co-operative Women's Guild and the Women's Labour League. The group believed that the Women's Suffrage movement was being damaged by class divisions, such as those that split the Women's Social and Political Union and the Women's Freedom League. They also thought that universal suffrage would be more popular with the liberal Government, as it was likely that voting rights only for privileged women would likely increase the conservative vote.
