= Muriel Turner, Baroness Turner of Camden =

British Labour politician and trade union leader

The Right Honourable The Baroness Turner of Camden
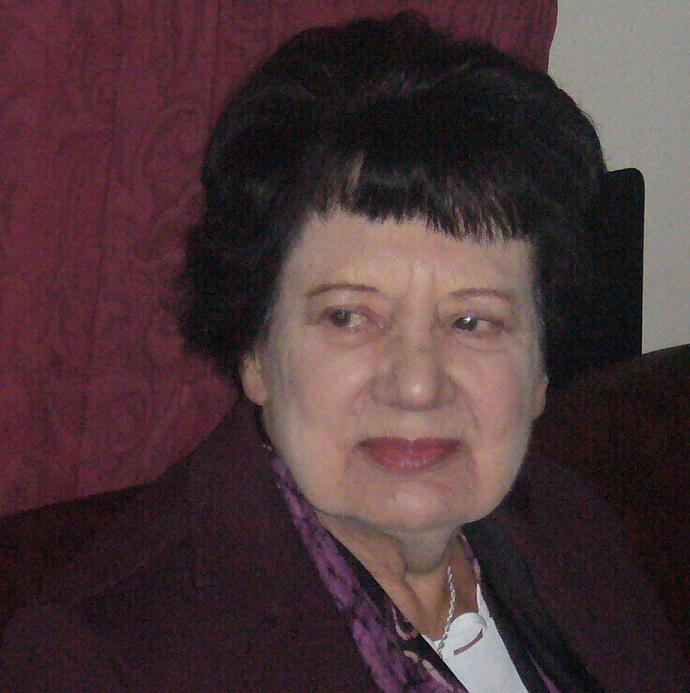

Member of the House of Lords
- Lord Temporal
- Life peerage 29 May 1985 – 13 June 2017

Personal details
- Born: Muriel Winifred Price; 18 September 1922 London, England
- Died: 26 February 2018 (aged 95) London, England
- Party: Labour
- Spouse: Reginald Turner (m. 1955; died 1995)

Muriel Winifred Turner, Baroness Turner of Camden (née Price; 18 September 1922 – 26 February 2018) was a British Labour politician and trade union leader.

== Background ==
Muriel Winifred Price was born in Balham, London, on 18 September 1922, the daughter of George and Winifred (née Bishop) Price. She spent her early years in Bromley, Kent. After an early marriage to George Springall, in 1947, subsequently ended in divorce, she married Reginald Thomas Frederick Turner, MC, DFC, in 1955. They did not have any children together but the marriage brought two step children. He predeceased her, dying in 1995.

== Career ==
Between 1970 and 1987 Turner was Assistant General Secretary of ASTMS (later Manufacturing, Science and Finance, Amicus and now Unite the Union). From 1981 to 1987 she was a member of the TUC General Council.

She was created a Life Peer on 29 May 1985 taking the title Baroness Turner of Camden, of Camden in Greater London. She had a particular interest in social welfare and pensions issues, and from 1987 until October 1996 was Front Bench Spokesperson on Employment for the Labour Opposition. She was Deputy Speaker of the House of Lords between 2002 and 2008.

She was a member of the Equal Opportunities Commission 1982–88; the Occupational Pensions Board 1977–93; Council Member, Occupational Pensions Advisory Service, 1989–2007; and chair, Personal Investment Authority Ombudsman Council 1994–97. She was a ranking member of British Parliamentary Committee for Iran Freedom.

Her membership in the House ended on 13 June 2017.

== Personal life ==
Turner was vice-president of Humanists UK and an Honorary Associate of the National Secular Society. On 15 September 2010, Turner, along with 54 other public figures, signed an open letter published in The Guardian, stating their opposition to Pope Benedict XVI's state visit to the UK.

Turner died in Croydon, London, on 26 February 2018, at the age of 95 (though many sources, using her publicly reported birth year of 1927, gave her age as 90).
