= Florence Hancock =

British trade unionist

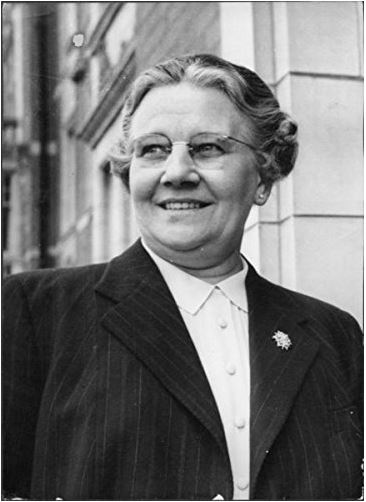
Florence Hancock

Dame Florence May Hancock DBE (25 February 1893 – 14 April 1974) was a British trade unionist.

Hancock was born in Chippenham to Jacob Hancock (1845–1913), a cloth weaver, and his second wife Mary (nee Harding, subsequently Pepler, c1859–1910), also a cloth weaver. Although widely reported to have thirteen siblings, Florence was one of at least 20 children - both parents had previously been widowed, with children from those relationships. She was the second child of Jacob and Mary, the others being Walter Hancock (1890–1914), Wilfrid Hancock (1895–96), Wilfred George Hancock (1896–1962), Lily Mabel Hancock (1898–1979), Ernest Edwin Hancock (1899–1953), and William John Hancock (born and died 1902).

In addition, members of Jacob's earlier family - William (1866–99), Joseph (1868–1943/9), Albert (1870–1952), Charles (1873–c1940), Martha (1875–78) and Mary (1876–1944) - also lived with the family, as did some of Mary's older children from her marriage to Frederick Pepler - Thomas (b&d 1878), Rosa Augusta (1879–80), Rose (1881–?), Laura (1882–1973), Frederick (1884–1915), Florence (1885–86) and Herbert James Vincent (1887–1952). Two of her brothers - Walter and Frederick - were killed on active service in the early years of the First World War.

It is reported that her interest in unions and workers rights was sparked by her father, who took her to see an address by David Lloyd George, future prime minister of the UK, when she was around the age of ten.

Her official biographies report that Hancock cared for her younger siblings in her youth, as she was orphaned before turning eighteen. However, while her mother died when she was seventeen, and as the oldest girl the role of keeping the house fell to her and her half-sister Laura (who lived with the family at the time), she did not lose her father until the age of twenty.

She started work in Chippenham's Waverley cafe, in the market place, at the age of twelve, then, two years later, took a job for Nestlé in a factory making condensed milk. Her half-brother Joseph also worked in the same factory. In 1913, she was a founding member of a branch of the Workers' Union at the factory, and when the sacking of two other founders led to a strike, she took a prominent role.

Hancock joined the Independent Labour Party in 1915, and was also very active in the Labour Party, supporting Charles Duncan's campaigns in Clay Cross. In the 1920s she was chair and secretary for the Gloucester Independent Labour Party. She became a full-time district organiser for the Workers' Union in 1917, and continued as an organiser as the Workers' Union became the Transport and General Workers Union (TGWU).

She also became involved in the campaign for the Trades Union Congress (TUC) to create a women's section. When it did so, she moved to Bristol and served on the committee, and then from 1935 on the General Council of the TUC. The TUC appointed her as their delegate to the International Labour Organization, and she served as the Chief Women's Officer of the TGWU from 1942, moving to London to do so. In 1947/8, she served as President of the TUC, and she served on several government committees.

== Awards ==
In 1942, Hancock was awarded the OBE, followed in 1947 by the CBE, and in 1951 a KBE. In later life, she served as a Governor of the BBC, a director of the Daily Herald and Remploy, and as governor of Hillcroft College.

== Marriage ==
Hancock married John Donovan in 1964, a colleague from the TGWU. Although the couple lived in Bristol, where Hancock had spent much of her single life, she died in Chippenham in 1974, while visiting one of her sisters.

Trade union offices
Preceded by Anne Loughlin and Julia Varley	Women Workers member of the General Council of the Trades Union Congress; 1935 – 1958; With: Anne Loughlin (1935 – 1949); Anne Godwin (1949 – 1958)	Succeeded by Anne Godwin and Ellen McCullough
Preceded by Julia Varley	Chief Women's Officer of the Transport and General Workers' Union; 1942 – 1958	Succeeded by Ellen McCullough
Preceded by George Walker Thomson	President of the Trades Union Congress; 1947/8	Succeeded by Will Lawther
Preceded by Lincoln Evans and Tom Williamson	Trades Union Congress representative to the American Federation of Labour; 1950; With: Will Lawther	Succeeded by Jim Kelly and Tom Yates
