= Pat Turner (trade unionist) =

British trade unionist (1927–2000)

Patricia Turner OBE (14 May 1927 – 22 July 2000) was a British trade unionist.

Turner studied at the London School of Economics before becoming a lecturer in industrial sociology. In 1969, she became a consultant for the Manpower and Productivity Service, then she was appointed as the Senior Industrial Relations officer of the Commission on Industrial Relations. In 1971, she became the National Woman Officer of the General and Municipal Workers' Union (GMWU), also joining the executive council of the Confederation of Shipbuilding and Engineering Unions (CSEU), and the Engineering Industry Training Board.

From 1973, Turner served on the executive of the Women's National Commission, and in 1976 she joined the Central Arbitration Committee. Around this time, she became National Industrial Officer of the GMWU, and in 1981, she was elected to the General Council of the Trades Union Congress. That year, she was also appointed an Officer of the Order of the British Empire in the 1981 Birthday Honours. In 1982/83, she was President of the CSEU, from 1985 she served on the Equal Opportunities Commission and from 1987 on the Employment Appeal Tribunal.

Turner retired from her trade union posts in 1989, but remained in several of her other posts, standing down from the last one in 1998.

Trade union offices
Preceded by Marian Veitch	National Women's Officer of the General and Municipal Workers' Union; 1971–1989	Succeeded by ?
Preceded by Gerry Eastwood	President of the Confederation of Shipbuilding and Engineering Unions; 1982–1983	Succeeded by Granville Hawley
Preceded by John Edmonds	National Industrial Officer of the General, Municipal, Boilermakers and Allied Trades Union; 1986–1989	Succeeded by ?
