= Anne Loughlin =

British activist (1894–1979)

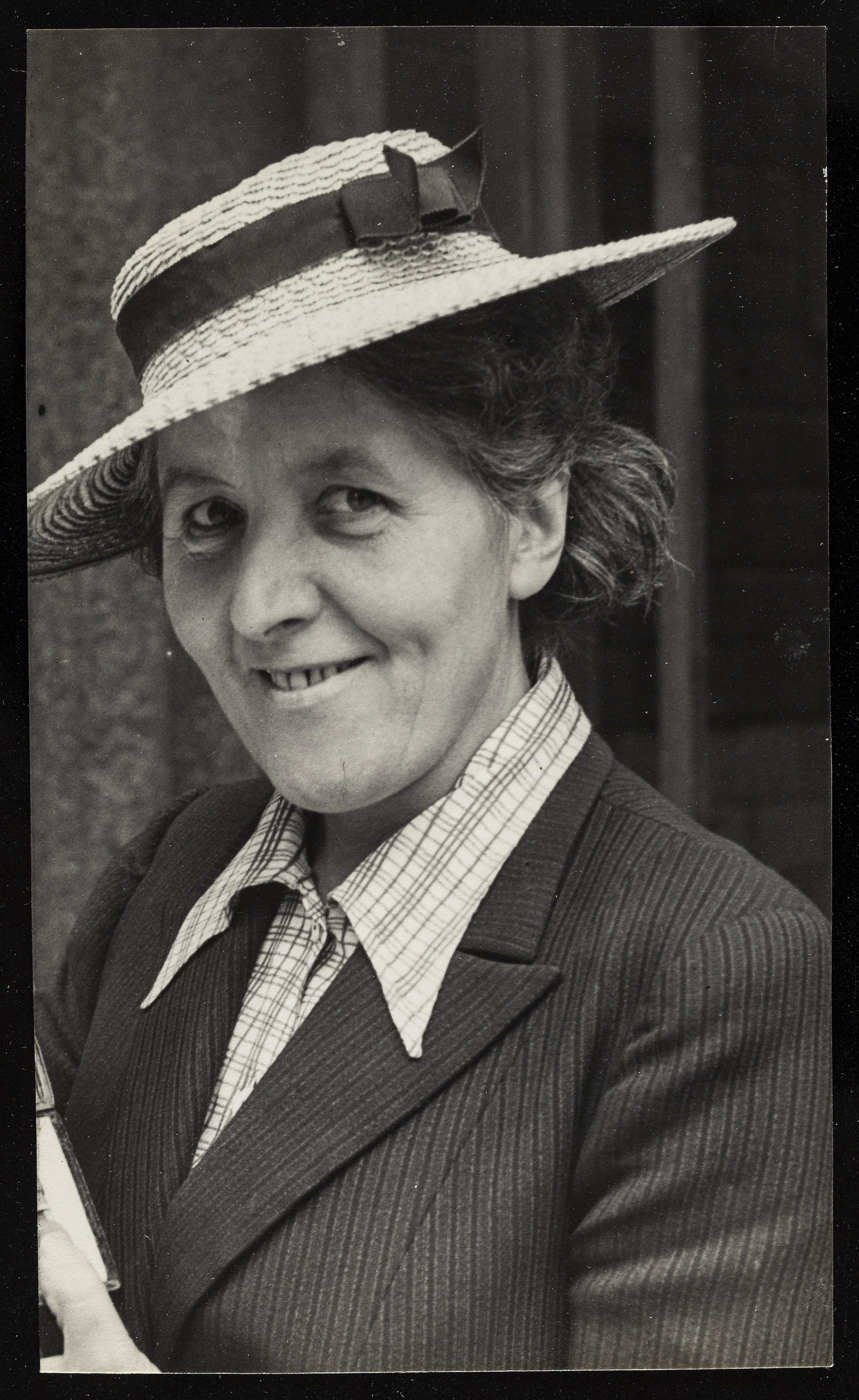
- Born: 28 June 1894
- Died: 14 July 1979 (aged 85)
- Occupation: Trade unionist

Dame Anne Loughlin, DBE (28 June 1894 – 14 July 1979) was a British labour activist and organiser.

== Early life ==
Loughlin was born in Leeds, England. Her father, Thomas, was a boot and shoe operative of Irish descent and her mother was Eliza Jane (born Daly). When Anne was twelve her mother died, and she had to care for her four sisters (two of whom were to go on to marry trade union officials). When she was 16 her father died, and Anne became the family breadwinner, starting work in a Leeds clothing factory for 3 pence an hour.

== National Union of Tailor and Garment Workers ==
In 1915, aged 21, Loughlin became a full-time organiser for the National Union of Tailor and Garment Workers (NUTGW) – the union to which she was to devote her whole career. The following year, she took charge of a strike of 6,000 clothing workers in Hebden Bridge. She showed a talent for journalism and helped to popularize the union paper, The Garment Worker, among young women. She penned a series of articles in the late 1920s entitled The Woman Worker at Home, in which she instructed 'bachelor girls' on diet (tips on various ways to cook eggs), exercise and make-up. However, clothing workers, especially in London, were confronted with increased use of lower-paid workers; earnings remained low, and there was a growing discontent among the workforce in general.

The NUTGW was based in Leeds, and most full-time officials came from the Leeds region; the London membership felt divorced from the centre of union power. There were also religious differences that heightened the tensions. The London membership was mainly Jewish and Protestant, while the Catholic minority in Leeds provided most of the leading officials: the National Secretary (Andrew Conley) was a Catholic, as was the London District Secretary (Bernard Sullivan), and there was Anne herself.

The London organiser of the NUTGW was Sam Elsbury, founder member of the Communist Party and as combative a personality as Andrew Conley. The United Clothing Workers at first recruited rapidly in London, with quite substantial minorities in Leeds and Glasgow. However it ran into serious difficulties over strike action within two months of its formation. Apart from bitter hostility from Conley, backed by the TUC, there were growing problems with strategy and tactics within the Communist Party, which led ultimately to Elsbury's expulsion. By 1933 the United Clothing Workers was a small group in the East End of London with about two hundred members, and it was finally disbanded in 1935.

Anne Loughlin moved into the top leadership of the union during the 1930s. She developed skills that would be put to great use during the Second World War. In December 1939 she was appointed to the advisory panel for the production of army clothing. She also served on the Ministry of Labour and National Service subcommittee on the wholesale clothing trade. During the war, the union faced acute labour shortages (with the loss of over a third of its workers to the forces and urgent war work), concentration of the industry, and the rationing of materials.

In 1948, Anne took over from her mentor and close friend Andrew Conley as union general secretary. Her election, however, was by no means a foregone conclusion, since there were several strong candidates, with Communist Mick Mindel being popular (in the atmosphere of 1947) and the anti-Communist cause being represented by the long-serving (since 1905), devoutly Roman Catholic Bernard Sullivan. Historians of the union described Conley's ability as 'a mixture of Irish blarney, charm and sheer inspiration' in persuading young women in the NUTGW that not only were they up to the job of union organiser, but that they could do it better than most men. This was motivated by his fear of what factionalism could do to a union which had won its unity only with great effort (after a complicated amalgamation and the earlier attempt at a breakaway by the communist-led National Minority Movement).

== Trade Union Congress ==
In 1942 Loughlin was elected as chairman of the General Council of the TUC (upon which she had served since 1929). She was only the second woman, after Margaret Bondfield, to hold this post and the first to preside at the annual conference (Bondfield missed out on this, having been called on to serve in the Ministry of Labour early in her year as chairman).

== Clothing Industry Development Council ==
There had been calls for the establishment of a central organization for the clothing industry in the deliberations of the Heavy Clothing Working Party (upon which Loughlin had served, along with other union representatives and employers) that was published in 1947. What was proposed was a central body that would, among other things, carry out scientific research, promote training and improve marketing and design. Loughlin keenly expressed a need for a central body in the industry. Plans for the Clothing Industry Development Council (CIDC) were announced by the President of the Board of Trade, Harold Wilson, in March 1948.

Employers, to Loughlin's distress, were unhappy about the proposals – in particular, the compulsory levy and the almost equal representation offered to unions as to employers' organisations. However the protest by the employers was not enough to stop parliamentary approval of the establishment of the CIDC in November 1949.

In late 1952, shortly after Anne had announced her retirement from the post of general secretary due to ill-health, the CIDC was soon after dissolved and replaced by an equally short-lived, and less effective, voluntary body.

== Honours, views and personality ==
In 1943 Anne Loughlin was made a DBE, an honour she accepted in the belief that it would open doors for the union. She went on to serve on the Royal Commission on Equal Pay (1944–1946) and was one of its honourable dissenting voices. She felt strongly that there was no justification for paying women less than men for the same job and argued that the introduction of equal pay would not have the destabilising effects prophesied in the main report by the commission.

Those who knew her commented on her ability to express complex arguments lucidly and in terms that everyone could understand. Employers respected this barely 5-foot-tall (1.5 m) woman, and she could gain concessions that others could not. She was not afraid to speak out about the injustices she found – whether these were in small clothing workshops or in large public companies employing thousands of clothing workers. She was equally quick to laud those firms which introduced welfare facilities. Whether it was laying the foundation stone for a new factory, speaking at a professional association dinner or prize giving at a technical college (she believed passionately in the need for a well-skilled work-force), she would rise to the occasion. However, she was also known to have a rough tongue when dealing with some of her colleagues.

== Retirement and death ==
Dame Anne Loughlin's retirement was a long one. On retirement she made a clean break with the union, and there appear to be no records of what she did during her remaining years. In 1975 the NUTGW marked International Women's Year with a plaque in the executive boardroom (renamed the Anne Loughlin Room) marking her achievements. It was unveiled by the TUC general secretary, Len Murray. Dame Anne herself was too ill to attend but was represented by one of her sisters, Mrs. Agnes McLaughlin. Four years later, on 14 July 1979, she died intestate, leaving £33,419 net (£34,159 gross).

Trade union offices
Preceded by Frank Wolstencroft	President of the Trades Union Congress; 1943	Succeeded by Ebby Edwards
Preceded by Andrew Conley	General Secretary of the National Union of Tailors and Garment Workers; 1948–1953	Succeeded by John E. Newton
Preceded by Margaret Bondfield and Julia Varley	Women Workers member of the General Council of the Trades Union Congress; 1929 – 1949; With: Julia Varley (1929 – 1935); Florence Hancock (1935 – 1949)	Succeeded by Anne Godwin and Florence Hancock
Preceded by Andrew Conley	Clothing Group member of the General Council of the TUC; 1949 – 1953	Succeeded by John E. Newton
