= Protestant Irish nationalists =

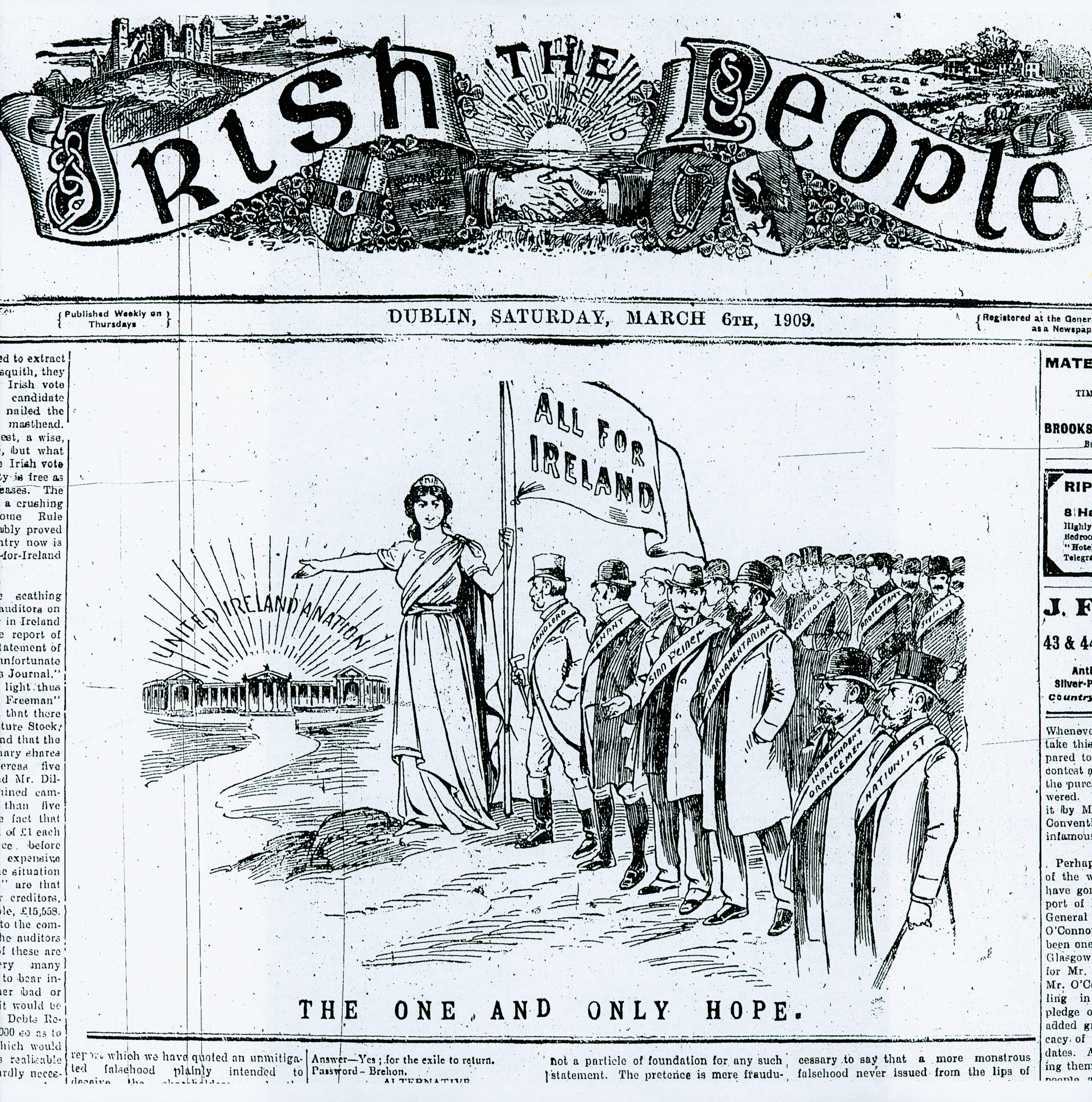
The Irish People March 1909: "All for Ireland – The One, and Only Hope!" William O'Brien's All for Ireland League.

Protestant Irish nationalists are people of Protestant persuasion or background in Ireland who with their Catholic-majority countrymen and women campaigned for Ireland's independence and the dissolution of its union with Great Britain. Through the nineteenth century, they attained positions of leadership in a succession nationalist movements, but they did so without the support of the broader Protestant community. Content with representation in the United Kingdom parliament, Protestant opinion remained overwhelmingly unionist.

In the former, separate but subordinate, Kingdom of Ireland, in which Catholics were excluded from public office, Irish Protestants readily identified as patriots. The focus of their patriotism was the parliament in Dublin. Its high-point was the armed Volunteer movement which in 1782 secured from the British Crown recognition of the parliament's exclusive right to legislate for Ireland. The movement subsequently split on the question of Catholic emancipation. In 1798, the more radical faction, concentrated in the Presbyterian north-east, broke into open rebellion in an effort, as "United Irishmen", to abolish confessional privilege and establish a representative republic.

Reconciled after 1800 to the union, Protestants were broadly hostile to political and cultural movements that, in arguing a new case for Irish nationality and statehood, celebrated Ireland's fealty to the Catholic Church and its Gaelic heritage, and depreciated the ties by which Protestants in particular felt bound to Britain and to its empire. The nationalist tradition nonetheless honours the contribution of individual Protestants, among them: Thomas Davis and John Mitchel as dissenters from the compromising leadership of "the Emancipator" Daniel O'Connell; Isaac Butt and Charles Stewart Parnell as leaders of the Home Rule movement; Douglas Hyde and Alice Milligan as promoters of a linguistically and culturally "Irish Ireland"; and, in the early twentieth century, Roger Casement, and Constance Markievicz as "physical-force" republicans.

Following the partition settlement of 1921, in the six Ulster counties retained as Northern Ireland within the United Kingdom, Protestants in labour and socialist circles continued to be drawn to James Connolly's vision of an all-Ireland workers' republic. From the late 1960s, a stricter sectarian division was imposed by the onset of "the Troubles". It is reflected in the exclusively Catholic background of the present leadership in Sinn Féin, and of the SDLP, as it is in the exclusively Protestant background of unionist party leadership.

== Pre-Union background ==
=== Anglo-Irish patriots ===
When in 1782 the Patriot leader Henry Grattan declared that Ireland had become, with the achievement of its legislative independence, "a nation", he reportedly invoked the names of William Molyneux and Jonathan Swift. Molyneux's The Case of Ireland stated (1696) and Swift's Drapier's Letters (1724–25) have been cited as the first stirrings of a modern Irish nationalism. Yet their rejection of English claims that Ireland was a colony, and insistence that the island was, in the words of Molyneux, "a Compleat Kingdom within itself", was entirely circumscribed by their commitment to Ireland's Anglican establishment. Maintained through a system of sacramental tests, "pocket boroughs" and government patronage, this produced a parliament dominated by a landed interest that, fearful for its privileges, deferred to the English-appointed Dublin Castle administration.

Grattan's Volunteers, whose parading in arms had helped win concessions from London, pressed for further reforms that might have opened the Irish parliament to Presbyterians and other Protestant "Dissenters", but there was no resolution in favour of Catholic emancipation.

=== United Irishmen ===
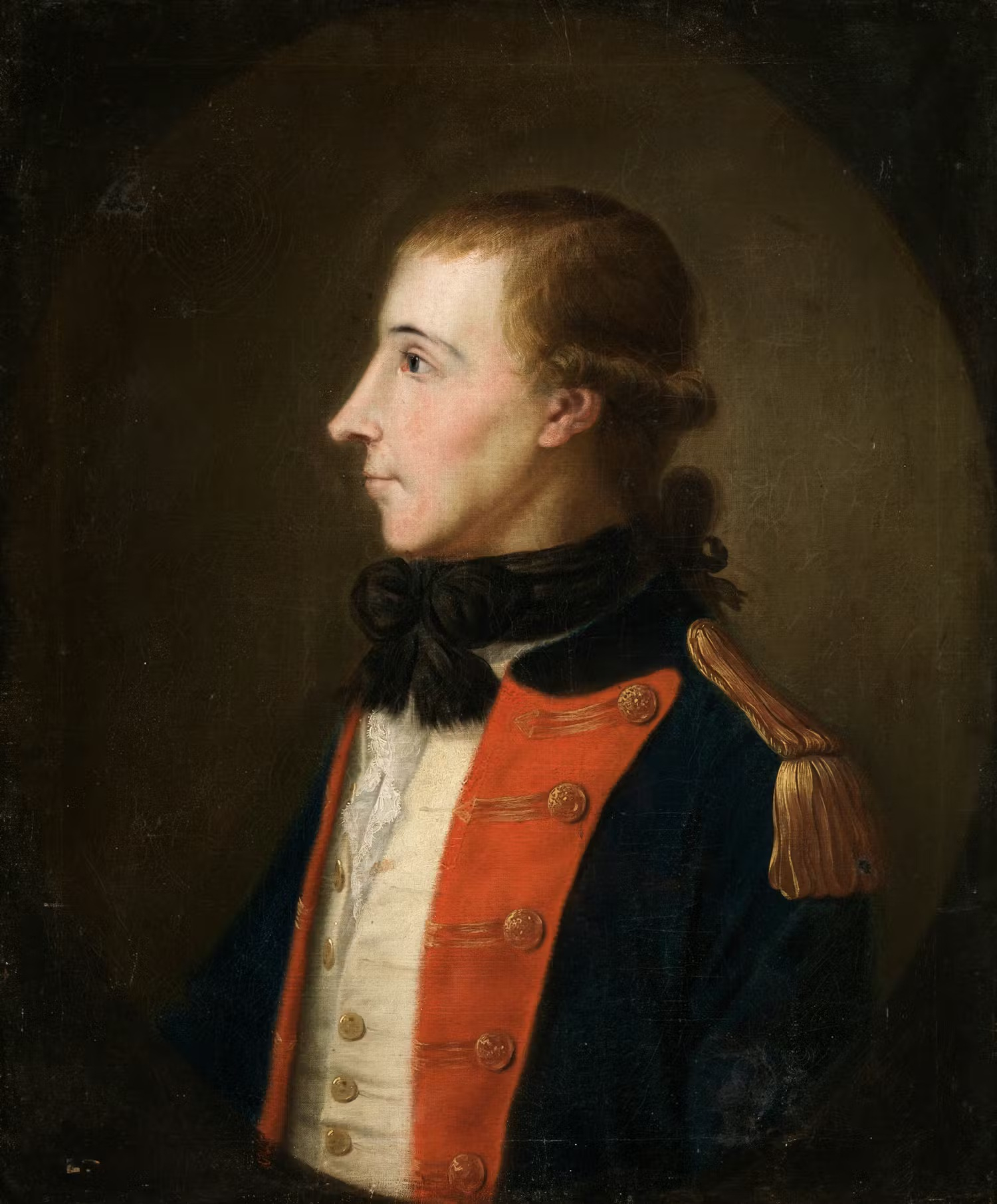
Wolfe Tone (1763–1798)

Disaffection concentrated in Belfast where already, in 1784, Volunteer companies had been admitting Catholics to their ranks in the conviction that "a general Union of all the inhabitants of Ireland is necessary to the freedom and prosperity of this kingdom".^{[12]} Re-animated by news of the revolutionary events in France, in October 1791 a group of Volunteer veterans among the town's Presbyterian merchants responded to an invitation from the physician William Drennan to enter into "a plot for the people". Calling themselves, at the suggestion of a Dublin attorney, Theobald Wolfe Tone, the Society of United Irishmen, and adopting his draft resolution, they proposed a union of Catholic, Protestant and Dissenters to upend the Ascendancy and to hold the government accountable to a representative parliament.

In 1913, at what he described as "the holiest place in Ireland", the grave of Wolfe Tone in Bodenstown, Patrick Pearse declared Tone "the greatest of Irish Nationalists", and he placed the movement he helped found, and the insurrection it precipitated in 1798, in a line succession from the Irish Rebellion of 1641 and the resistance to the Williamite invasion of 1689.

Contemporary historians have taken issue with this "teleological" narrative. They suggest that, for Tone and his fellow Protestants, the precedents were not Irish, but American and French, and that their unity of creeds was in practice fraught. In Dublin where, reflecting the capital's larger, more denominationally mixed middle class, the Society encompassed from the outset Protestant, Catholic and Dissenter, Drennan promoted a secret "inner Society". The Catholics, he feared might "save themselves" by accepting emancipation leaving it to the Protestants to "save the nation". As it was, when the society began to arm, both Drennan and the leading Catholics dropped out of its inner counsels, so that, in the spring of 1798, it was an entirely Protestant directory that signalled for the country to rise.

In Ulster, the Society was strongest in the comfortably Protestant-majority districts in the east (Belfast, and immediate hinterlands) but conceded ground to the new-formed Orange Order in the west where folk memories of the massacres of 1641 sharpened the sectarian competition for tenancies and employment. In June 1798, Catholics "turned out" with their Protestant neighbours in Antrim and Down, although there were stories of sectarian taunts driving them from Henry Joy McCracken's ill-fated march upon Antrim Town, and, although the accounts are disputed, of withdrawing from the rebel camp of Henry Munro on the eve its rout in the battle of Ballynahinch.

== From Emmet to the Fenians ==
=== Emmet and the Union ===
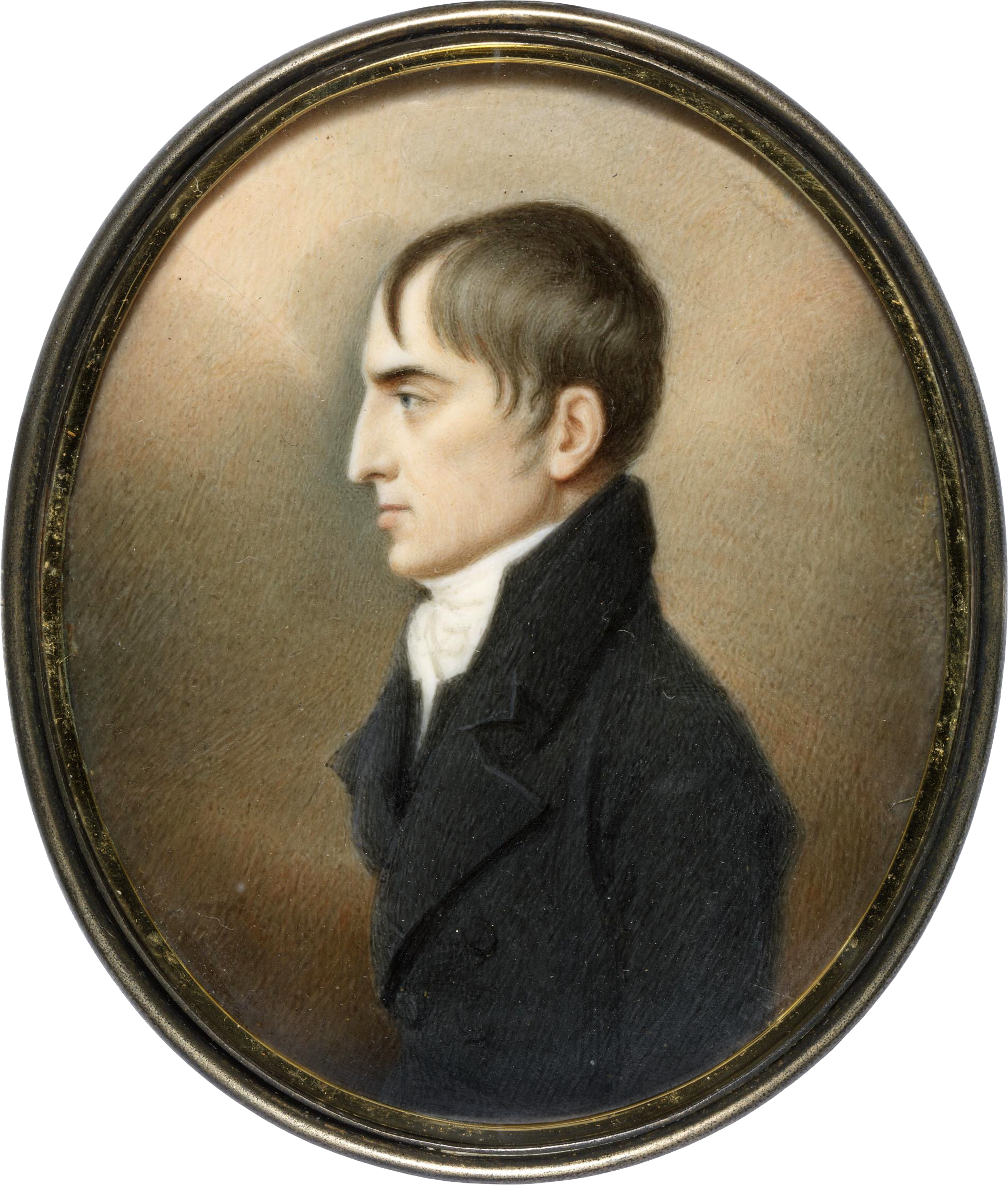
Robert Emmet (1778–1803) by John Comerford

Protesting the "accursed union" with Britain that in 1801 had stripped Ireland of its last "vestige of self government", its parliament, in July 1803 Robert Emmet pressed forward with an ill-starred attempt to rekindle the United Irish rebellion with a rising in Dublin. This was despite conceding that "no leading Catholic is committed" ("we are all Protestants"), and the failure of the veteran United Irish organisers James Hope and of Thomas Russell to secure pledges in what had been the Presbyterian heartlands of the movement in the north.

In the decades that followed the admission of Catholics to Parliament in 1829 and the first of a succession of reform acts in 1832, and against the background of renewed Presbyterian emigration (removing the unreconciled and disaffected), Protestants settled on a conciliatory consensus: had their forefathers been offered a union under the constitution as it later developed, with "equal laws for the whole Irish people", there would have been "no rebellion". In the meantime, the thirty years of popular agitation that been required for the union to deliver on its original promise of emancipation had mobilised every class of Catholic in the south, an achievement in which Protestants perceived in increasingly threatening terms.

=== Repealers ===
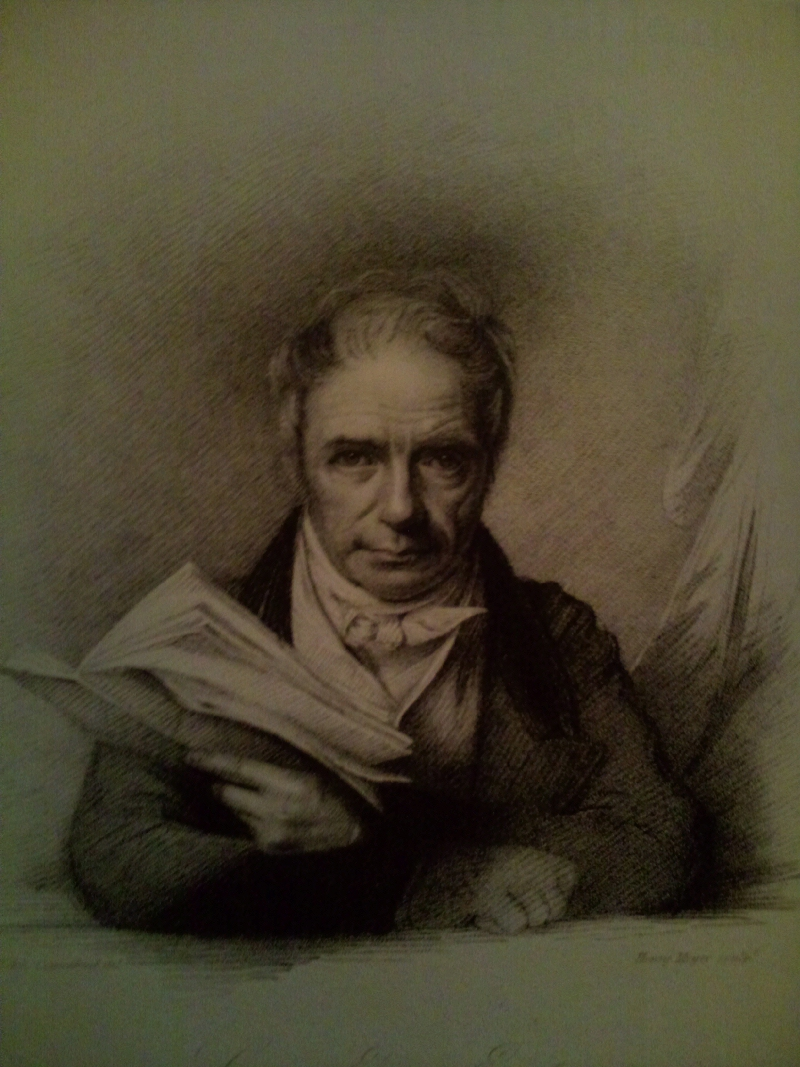
George Ensor (1769–1843) by John Comerford

Few Protestants were prepared to join Daniel O'Connell when he repurposed his penny-a-month Catholic Association to campaign for a repeal the Act of Union and the restoration of an Irish parliament. Among those who did was the prolific pamphleteer George Ensor. Ensor had been among the first Armagh members of the Catholic Association, a notable position in a county renowned as a stronghold of the Orange Order. On the recommendation of Jeremy Bentham, in 1828 O'Connell had considered taking on Ensor as his running mate in the 1828 by-election for the two-member County Clare constituency. O'Connell's election forced the issue, persuading the government to amend the sacramental oaths that had barred Catholics from higher office and from Parliament. But Ensor was critical of O'Connell's willingness to accept "disenfranchisement project" attached to the developing Catholic relief bill.

The Parliamentary Elections (Ireland) Act 1829, which received its royal assent on the same day as the Roman Catholic Relief Act, raised the freehold qualification for the county vote in Ireland fivefold to English ten-pound level. Ensor cautioned that "casting two or three million" forty-shilling freeholders, both Catholic and Protestant, "into the abyss" so that a few Catholic gentlemen might be returned to Parliament would prove "disastrous" for the country.

In Dublin, O'Connell had a more reliable ally in John Gray, the Protestant proprietor of the Freeman's Journal. Following his assistance in promoting a series of "monster" Repeal meetings, in 1844 Gray was sentenced with O'Connell to nine months imprisonment on a charge of sedition (remitted on appeal). Later, in an alliance with the Catholic Archbishop of Dublin, Paul Cullen, Gray's newspaper supported the National Association of Ireland which called for the disestablishment of the Church of Ireland, land reform, and greater educational provision. Gray ended his career in 1875 as a Home Rule League MP for Kilkenny.

=== Young Irelanders ===
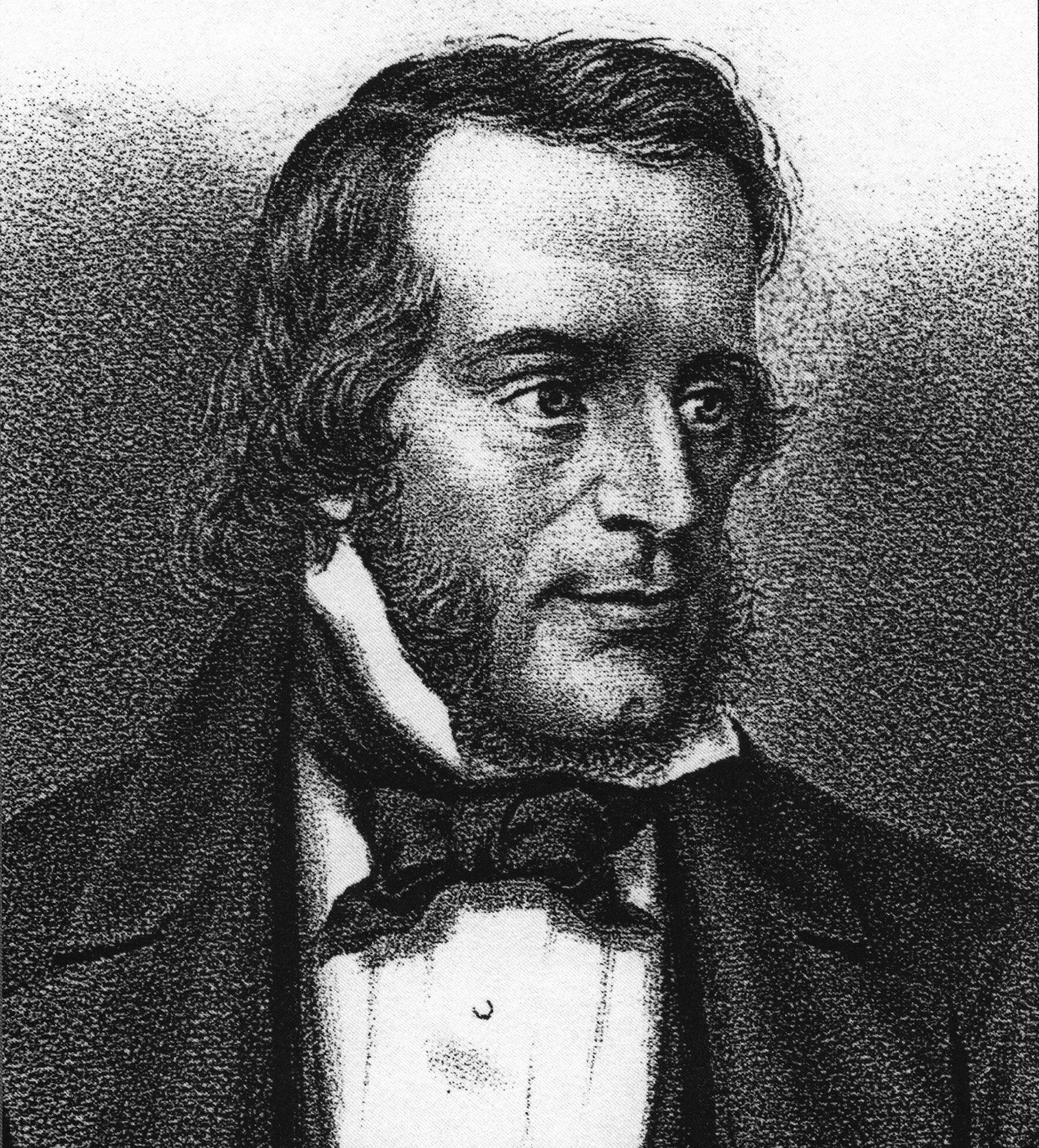
Thomas Davis (1814–1845)

Indicted alongside O'Connell and Gray in 1844 was Charles Gavan Duffy, proprietor in Dublin of The Nation. When he had first followed O'Connell, Duffy, an Ulster Catholic, conceded that he had "burned with the desire to set up again the Celtic race and the Catholic church". But, under the influence his co-editor, Thomas Davis, a Protestant from Mallow, County Cork, he dedicated the new weekly to an idea of "nationality" that would embrace as easily "the stranger who is within our gates" as "the Irishman of a hundred generations."

In pursuit of this vision, and seeking an "alternative national hero" to O'Connell, Davis contributed to an hagiography of the United Irishmen, centred on the figure of Wolfe Tone. In 1843, he published his elegiac poem Tone's Grave, and with the blessing Tone's widow Mathilda (in American exile), organised the first Bodenstown Tone memorial.

Davis promoted the vision of an Ireland in which Catholics and Protestants would find sufficient unity in their "recollections, ancestral, personal, national", to resist England's "unnatural", "cosmopolite" influence. Rejecting the utilitarian case O'Connell made for English, in the pages of The Nation he promoted the study and use of Irish, a language "inseparably mingled", in his view, with the history and "soul" of the Irish people.

In 1845, shortly before his unexpected death, Davis clashed with O'Connell over the Emancipator's denunciation of the non-denominational Queens Colleges. When Davis pleaded that "reasons for separate education are reasons for [a] separate life", O'Connell suggested that Davis and his colleagues were becoming "Young Irelanders"—a reference to Giuseppe Mazzini's Young Italy who in 1849 had briefly imposed a republic upon the Pope in Rome.

Davis's place at The Nation was taken by a man whom Pearse would later venerate as a "fierce" and "sublime" apostle of Irish republicanism, John Mitchel, a Protestant solicitor originally from Dungiven in County Londonderry. With onset in 1846 of the Great Famine, Mitchel accused the government, led by O'Connell's friend, Lord John Russell, of devising a "relief" policy to slaughter a portion of the people and pauperise of the rest. In January 1847, the Young Irelanders withdrew from O'Connell's Repeal Asscoation and formed the Irish Confederation.

Mitchel had already antagonised his colleagues by carrying Davis's rejection of "modern Anglicanism" to the point of protesting British intervention against the Atlantic slave trade, and he now broke with them in turn. The famine crisis, he argued, required "a more vigorous policy against the English Government" than they were willing to pursue. After sixteen issues his new paper, United Irishman, was suppressed and, convicted in April 1848 of a Treason Felony, Mitchel was sentenced to be "transported beyond the seas for the term of fourteen years."

In July 1848, William Smith O'Brien, a Protestant landowner through whom Duffy, had hoped to broadened the Confederation appeal, raised the standard of revolt in Kilkenny. This was a tricolour he had brought back from Paris of the Second Republic, its colours (green for Catholics, orange for Protestants, and white for harmony between the two) intended to symbolise the United Irish republican ideal. But with little Confederate organisation in the countryside, O'Brien found himself in command of only a few hundred largely unarmed men who scattered after their first skirmish with the constabulary. Sentenced to penal transportation, O'Brien joined Mitchel in Van Diemen's Land.

=== Fenians ===
A commitment to "physical force" was sustained by the Irish Republican Brotherhood (IRB), formed in 1858 in Dublin, and in American exile by its sister organisation the Fenian Brotherhood (later Clan na Gael). In 1867, the Fenians, mobilising Irish veterans of the American Civil War, raided across the northern border of the United States with a view to holding Canada hostage to the grant of Irish Independence, attempted an armed rising at home.

Two years before, David Bell, a member of the IRB executive council, had evaded a police dragnet in Dublin, fleeing first to Paris, then to the United States. As a Secessionist Presbyterian minister in Ballybay, in County Monaghan, Bell had shared platforms with Catholic priests to promote the all-Ireland Tenant Right League with its call for fixity of tenure at fair rent. Despite the strength of the movement among Protestant tenant farmers, Bell had been unable to deliver for what Gavan Duffy had hailed as the "League of North and South". In the elections of 1852, Presbyterians in County Monaghan would not vote for John Gray (of the Freeman's Journal) standing as the Tenant Right candidate.

In American exile, Bell encountered, and denounced, John Mitchel (escaped from his penal colony in Australia) who had been an uncompromising pro-slavery partisan of the Southern secessionist cause. Under the masthead, "A Journal of Liberty, Literature, and Social Progress", Bell published the Irish Republic, in which he sought to tie physical-force Irish republicanism of the Fenians with the Radical Republican agenda in the United States of black enfranchisement and Reconstruction.

== Home Rule era ==
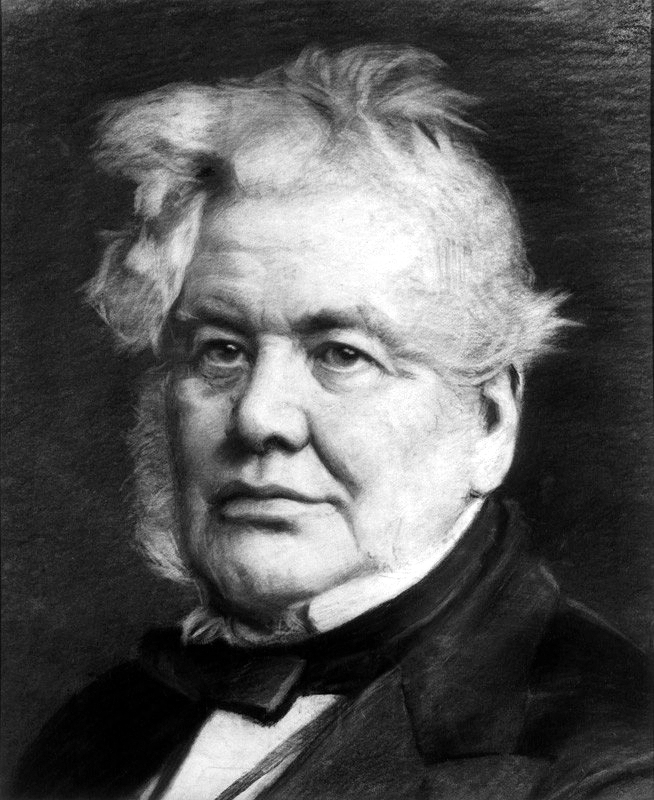
Isaac Butt (1813–1879) by John Butler Yeats

=== Home Rulers ===
In response to the "arrests, trials, speeches from the dock, imprisonments, sufferings, and occasional daring rescues" that followed the "Fenian rising" in Ireland, an amnesty movement formed in which moderate political figures were willing to intercede. These included, as president of the Amnesty Association, Isaac Butt, the Liberal MP for Youghal who in 1848 had represented Duffy and other Young Irelanders. In 1873, Butt proposed with the formation of the Home Rule League, that . rather than repeal, Ireland would accept a parliament within the United Kingdom with powers to control its domestic affairs devolved from Westminster.

It was in protest against what he insisted would continue to be "foreign rule" that, in 1875, Mitchel returned to Ireland, dying at his home in Newry days after repeating O'Donovan Rossa's achievement six years before of being returned as the MP for County Tipperary on an abstentionist ticket.

Butt, the son of a Church of Ireland rector in County Donegal, had first entered Parliament for Youghal in 1852 as a Conservative. But already, as a political economist, and in response to the catastrophe of the Famine, he had concluded that for Ireland the British union and its common market posed an existential threat. The prospect (outside of Ulster which, alone, seemed to attract Scottish and English capital) was of continued pressure, and poverty, on the land. At the same time, with the tenant righters, he agreed that there was an immediate question of land tenure, one that involved "the very life of the nation, the right of the Celtic race to live in their own land" and which approached "the very foundation of society and proprietary rights".

In its early stages, Butt's Home-Rule association had included an "incongruous alliance" of Protestants who as conservatives still wished for "a union of Irishmen rather than a union of parliaments", and upper-middle class Catholic Whigs and their clergy. Following success of the Home Rule League in the 1874 general election (fifty-nine members returned to Westminster in a first-time use of the secret ballot), Butt contended with a more radical coalition of former Fenians and other advanced nationalists and militant tenant farmers. The champions for these, more impatient, elements were Joseph Biggar and Charles Stewart Parnell.

=== Parnellites and anti-Parnellites ===
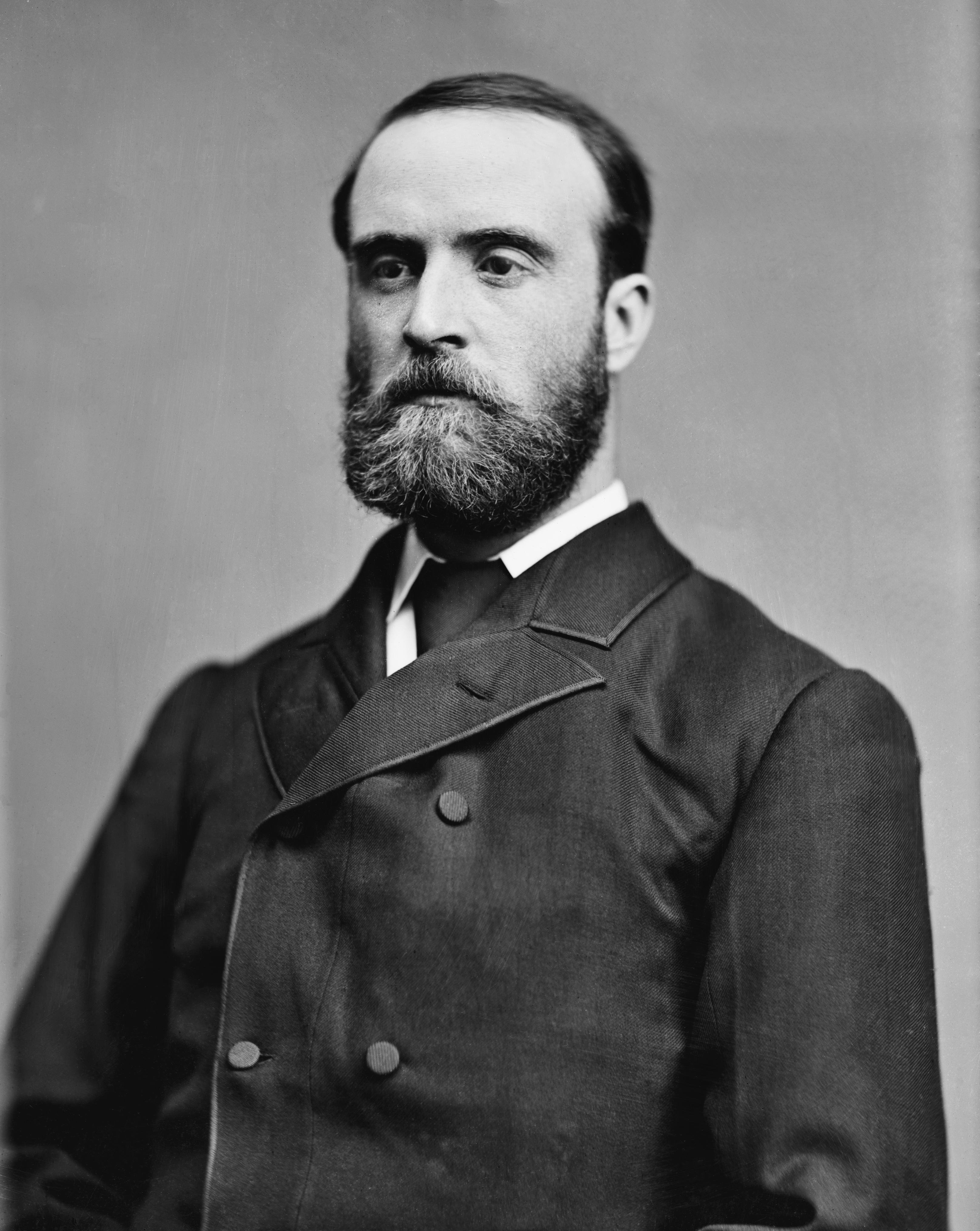
Charles Stewart Parnell (1846–1891)

After his election in 1874 from County Cavan, Joseph Biggar, a wealthy Belfast provision merchant, converted to Catholicism. He also joined the Irish Republican Brotherhood and accepted a seat on its Supreme Council, but only, he was to insist, with a view to winning Fenian support for Home Rule League's parliamentary strategy. Abandoning the restraint traditionally exercised in the House of Commons by oppositions who might themselves attain office, Biggar led the Irish MPs in obstructing the business of government on the floor of the Commons in order to force the consideration of their demands. He was supported, against the disapproval of Butt, by Parnell, and when Butt died in 1879 Parnell replaced him as the leader the Irish Parliamentary Party (IPP).

Parnell had been born into a landed, Ascendancy, family in County Wicklow, that had celebrated its past connection to the Volunteer movement and opposition to the Act of Union. Parnell's refusal to see Ireland treated as a "geographical fragment" of England is also been attributed to the influence of his American mother. He had been elected to Parliament in a County Meath by-electioni in 1875 with the endorsement of the IRB's Patrick Egan, and his first reported intervention in the Commons was in defence of the Manchester Martyrs, the three IRB men hanged in 1867 for the death of a police sergeant. He consolidated his bid for leadership by securing from leading IRB and Clan na Gael figures endorsement for a "New Departure". This was a constitutional path to Irish self-government conditioned on energetic resistance to coercion acts and vigorous agitation on the land question.

Parnell was simultaneously elected president of Michael Davitt's newly founded Irish National Land League. Strengthening his grip on both Party and League, he weathered the outrage over the escalating violence of the Land War and the Phoenix Park murders, and able to hold Gladstone's Liberal government to promises of land reform (1881, 1882) and, at the cost of splitting the government majority, of a Home Rule bill (1886).

Parnell's position was abruptly undermined when, in 1890, he was when named in a divorce case, revealing his affair with Kitty O'Shea. In advancing candidates for Westminster, Parnell had favoured northern Protestants: putting Isaac Nelson into his own former seat County Mayo, after the Presbyterian minister, who had refused to support the endowment of a Catholic university, was rejected in County Leitrim; and John Pinkerton into Galway Borough, after the founder-member of the Protestant Home Rule Association failed to top the poll in his North Antrim constituency. Yet in the split within the Irish party over Parnell, which was to persist long after his death in October 1891, Pinkerton stood with the majority Anti-Parnellites, as did other senior Protestant MPs. Priests reportedly "swarmed the polling stations and kept the voters constantly in view" to ensure the defeat of Parnellites, but the condemnation of Parnell by the Catholic bishops had not been greater than that of Protestant churchmen.

=== Cultural nationalist ===
Alice Milligan (l) (1865–1953) with Ethna Carbery

In June 1891, defying a "Tory and Protestant" upbringing, Alice Milligan claims to have turned "Parnellite" after seeing the leader "beaten and ashamed" at a public meeting in Dublin.

Already a student of the Irish language, which as a child she had heard spoken by farm hands in her native Tyrone, in 1893 Milligan joined Conradh na Gaeilge, the Gaelic League, which in 1904 hired her as a travelling lecturer. In seeking to recruit among Protestants in Ulster, she collaborated with League president Douglas Hyde and the Galway MP Stephen Gwynn, both sons of Church of Ireland clergymen, and with Francis Joseph Bigger, a wealthy Presbyterian solicitor, whose house on the northern shore of Belfast Lough, Ard Righ, offered a salon for the northern poets and writers of the Irish Literary Revival.

In founding the League, Hyde (the future first President of Ireland) declared that "in Anglicising ourselves wholesale we have thrown away with a light heart the best claim we have to nationality". While this commitment to an "Irish Ireland" was in the spirit of Thomas Davis, Hyde initially tried to avoid association with political nationalism and to cultivate unionist participation. The Irish language, he declared, "is neither Protestant nor Catholic, it is neither a Unionist nor a Separatist."

In 1895, the League's first branch in Ulster was formed in Belfast under the patronage of Orange Order Grand Master, Richard Rutledge Kane. But from the beginning Milligan understood the conflict between the Hyde's non-political rhetoric and the nationalism implicit in the League's revivalist project.

In 1896, with Ethna Carbery, the daughter of local IRB man, Milligan began publication in Belfast The Shan Van Vocht (The "Poor Old Woman" in Irish, the metaphor for Ireland in a popular 1798-era ballad), a monthly that followed broadly the formula pioneered by Davis in The Nation. Together with the Irish language, a unity-above-creed-and-class nationalism was presented to an English-language readership in a mixture of poetry, serialised fiction, Irish history, political analysis and announcements. Although much of the writing was her own, Milligan offered a broad political platform, printing in the first edition James Connolly's Socialist Republican manifesto, "Socialism and Nationalism".

Milligan's attempt in the journal to unify nationalists across region, class, sex and religion proved untenable: no faction or party was prepared to provide enough financial support to sustain it. In 1899, the IRB persuaded Milligan and Johnston to pass their subscription list on to Arthur Griffith and his new Dublin weekly, the United Irishman, organ of the original Cumann na nGaedheal, the forerunner of Sinn Féin.

Other Protestant figures within the Irish literary revival ran afoul of nationalist opinion. Together with Augusta Gregory, W. B. Yeats, a poet and dramatist "determined to write himself and his people into the Irish nationalist story", found himself accused by Griffith of promoting, at Abbey Theatre in Dublin, work that outraged Irish moral and national sensitivities. Between 1904 and 1907, they staged three plays by John Millington Synge, a writer who had declared his wish to "work on my own for the cause of Ireland", all which met with nationalist and clerical disapproval. The last of these,The Playboy of the Western World, triggered a riot. Years later, the Abbey's staging in 1926 of The Plough and the Stars by Seán O'Casey, another Protestant writer who had broken with nationalist mainstream, provoked similar protests.

=== Dissident nationalists and conciliators ===
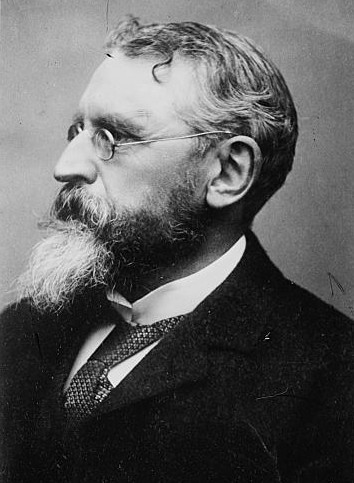
William O'Brien (1852–1928)

The son of a modest Protestant family in the birthplace of Thomas Davis, Mallow, County Cork, William O'Brien's advocacy of Irish Independence followed in the tradition of his predecessor: he acknowledged the existence of many strands of Irishness. Citing "the gloom of inevitable failure" he abandoned his early involvement with the Fenian brotherhood, opting instead to work with Parnell in the Irish National Land League. As the author, in 1882, of the Land War No Rent Manifesto, and member of League's "the de facto military council", O'Brien faced repeated imprisonment. After the 1887 ''Bloody Sunday" riots in London, he briefly went into exile in America.

Following the defeat of the second Home Rule Bill in 1893, and disillusioned by the Parnell split, O'Brien retired from Parliament in 1895 and, with Michael Davitt, established a new grass-roots organisation the United Irish League (UIL). By 1900, it was the largest nationalist organisation in the country, with 1150 branches and 84,355 members. The discredited IPP factions responded with a quick defensive reunion under John Redmond (a Parnellite who quickly redeemed the favour of the Catholic Church).

Tensions mounted as O'Brien pursued the goal of transferring land to tenant farmers by working with those in the Irish executive who, after the Gladstonian commitment to a Dublin Parliament had run its course, called for "constructive unionism". He led the tenant representation to the December 1902 Land Conference, an initiative of moderate landlords led by Lord Dunraven. Tenants' demands were conceded, and following a policy of "conference plus business", O'Brien helped secure passage of the Land Purchase (Ireland) Act 1903 which set the terms of retirement for the Anglo-Irish gentry.

O'Brien was criticised by party leaders for putting resolution of the land question before Home Rule. The transfer of ownership was on terms that did not make tenants feel sufficiently beholden to the IPP. In 1904, Redmond subverted O'Brien's influence within the UIL by securing the appointment of Belfast west MP, Joseph Devlin, Grandmaster of the Ancient Order of Hibernians, as its new secretary. With their ethnic, exclusively Catholic, nationalism, O'Brien regarded the AOH as "the most damnable fact in the history of this country" – the nationalist equivalent to the Orange Order. Compromised by the AOH, he saw the IPP set upon a path which would frustrate any All-Ireland Home Rule settlement.

In 1909 O'Brien inaugurated the All-for-Ireland League (AFIL). Under the banner of the "Three Cs" – Conference, Conciliation and Consent – he hoped to obtain an All-Ireland parliament without coercing Protestant Ulster. The League was supported by many Munster Protestants, including landowners and business figures, and was joined from Ulster by Lord Rossmore, once Grandmaster of the Orange Institution, and James Sharman Crawford, a tenant-right Liberal. Despite bitter opposition from the IPP and local bishops, in the 1910 general election, the Cork electorate returned eight "O'Brienite" MPs.

When, after 1912, the IPP again held the balance of power at Westminster, and the Liberal government's passage of a Home Rule bill was assured, O'Brien offered a series of amendments as alternatives to IPP's "Ulster must follow" policy. His MPs abstained on the final passage of the Government of Ireland Act 1914, denouncing it as "plan for the dismemberment of Ireland".

In the aftermath of the 1916 Easter Rising, and the anti-conscription crisis in April 1918, O'Brien was persuaded that there was no future for his conciliatory stratagems. In the December 1918 general elections, the AFIL stood down in favour of Sinn Féin, whose candidates were returned unopposed.

=== Opponents of "Carsonism" ===
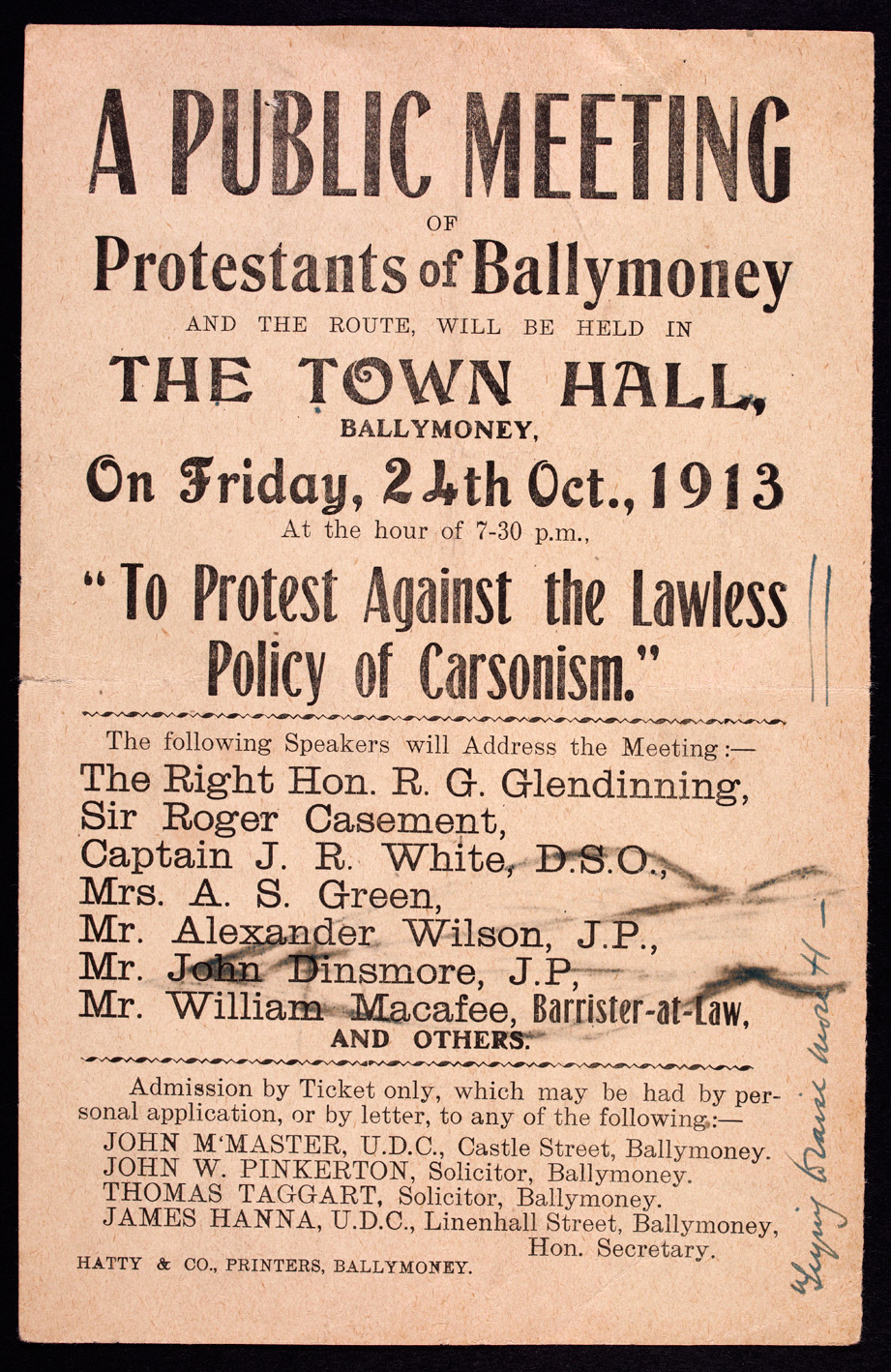
Protestants protest "the Lawless Policy of Carsonism", 1913

At Ard Righ, Milligan met Roger Casement, then a fellow Gaelic Leaguer (with family roots in Belfast and Ballycastle), and together they travelled Antrim. They were in Larne in April 1914 after Edward Carson's Ulster Volunteers had run German guns through the port, a feat Casement told her nationalists would need to match.

Returning from British consular service in Africa and in South America, where he had borne witness to the savagery of European colonialism, Casement was determined that Ireland should, as far practicable, distance herself from imperial Britain. The immediate task was to prevent Carson's mobilisation of Protestant Ulster from derailing the final passage of the third home rule bill. In October 1913, Casement, in his first ever public speech, addressed a meeting at which the "Protestants of Ballymoney and the Route" were invited to protest "the lawless policy of Carsonism".

The event was sponsored by James Armour, a Presbyterian minister who led tenant agitation in north Antrim. A sympathetic audience in Ballymoney may also have been anticipated on the strength, locally, of the Independent Orange Order. The order's first Grand Master, Robert Lindsay Crawford had promoted Independent lodges as "strongly Protestant, strongly democratic" and "strongly Irish". In the order's 1904 Magheramorne Manifesto, he had invited Irish Protestants to "reconsider their position as Irish citizens and their attitude towards their Roman Catholic countrymen".

With Casement on the town-hall platform was Alice Stopford Green and Captain Jack White. Stopford Green, who had supported Casement in the Congo Reform Movement, was the daughter of the Anglican Archdeacon of Meath. A popular historian, she was best known for The Making of Ireland and Its Undoing, 1200–1600 (1908), a chronicle of England's systematic pillaging and disruption of an Ireland that was self-confident, internationally connected, and Gaelic-speaking. White, active in Pinkerton's Irish Protestant Home Rule Association, proposed a Home Rule pledge to match the Carson's Ulster Covenant: "We intend to abide by the just laws of the lawful parliament of Ireland until such time as it may prove itself hostile to democracy, in sure confidence that God will stand by those who stand by the people irrespective of class or Creed." Circulated at some peril across County Antrim, the alternative covenant collected some 12,000 signatures.

Casement attempted, but failed, to build upon the Ballymoney meeting with further engagements. The Times of London concluded that the meeting had represented but a "small pocket of dissident Protestants, the last survivors of the Old Liberals.” Within a year, White was in Dublin drilling James Connolly's Irish Citizen Army, and Stopford Green had extended Casement a loan to help run German guns into Howth for the Irish Volunteers.

== Independence era ==
=== Revolutionary republicans ===
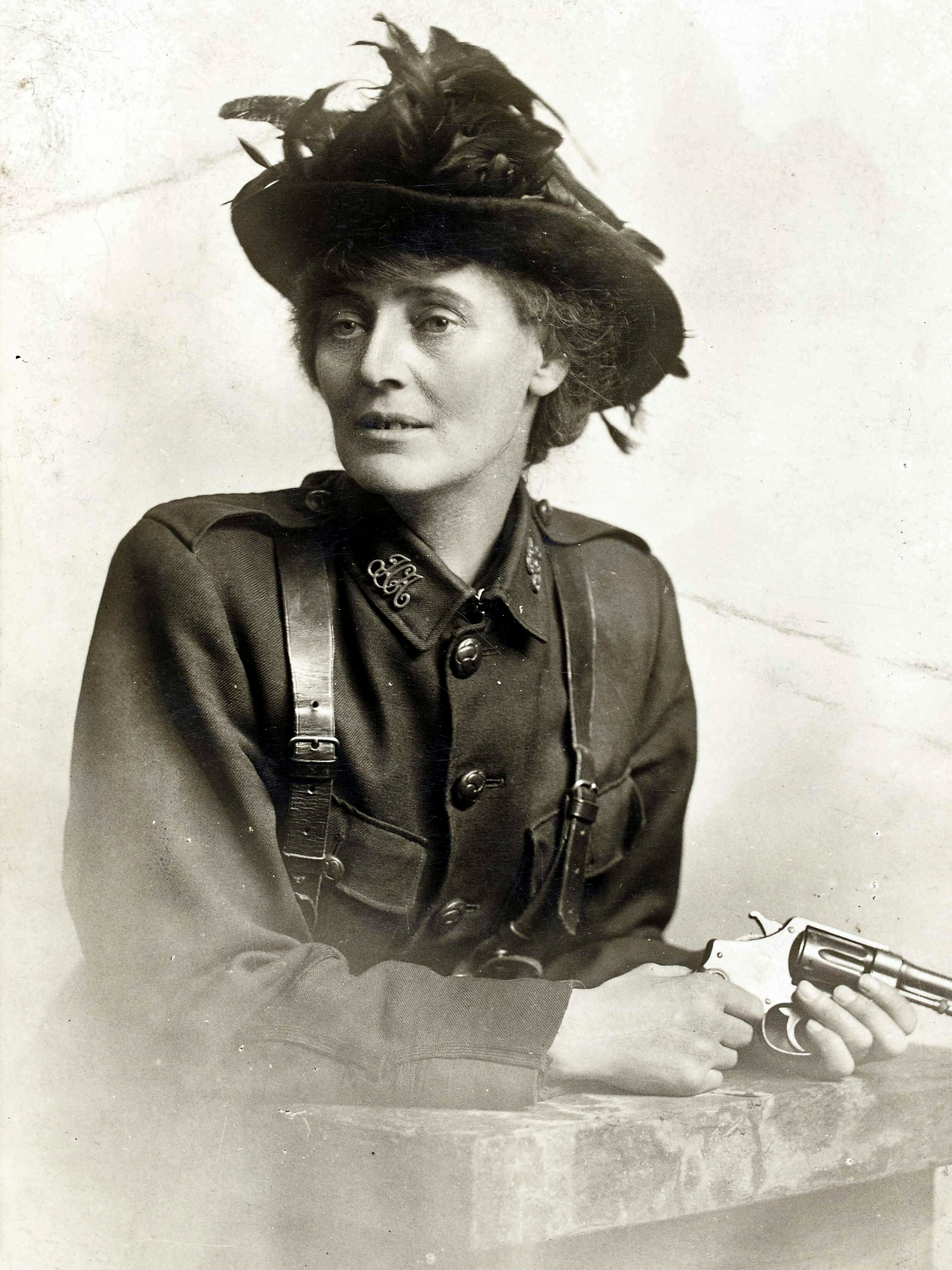
Constance Markiewicz (1868–1927) in the uniform she designed for the Irish Citizen Army.

While formed to protect picket lines and union rallies during Dublin lock-out of 1913, both Connolly and White regarded the Irish Citizen Army (ICA) as part of a broader response to the arming of unionism in the north. As desertions mounted with the defeat of the Irish Transport and General Workers Union, White moved on to the more credible counterweight to the Ulster Volunteers, the Irish Volunteers. He was given command of brigades in Derry City and the northwest, but found his authority weakened by the suspicion in the ranks that, as a Protestant, he would never lead them into a fight against Orangemen. After the outbreak of the Great War in August 1914, he tried to persuade the British authorities to pay and equip the Volunteers as a home guard under their own command. Of his attempt to invoke the Volunteers precedent of 1782, his comrades were no less suspicious than the government: "I was taken to be recruiting for Britain, whereas I was trying to use Britain to put Ireland into a position to enforce her own claims". White was dismissed from his Volunteer commands.

Connolly found a new source of ICA recruits, the nationalist youth of Fianna Éireann. The Fianna were a link to the IRB and to the Irish Volunteers—unacceptable to Seán O'Casey who, resigned from the ICA Council rather than cooperate with those he saw as having failed in the lock-out to stand by men trying to exercise "the first principles of Trade Unionism". Casey, who had been an active member of the Church of Ireland until his mid-twenties, continued as an independent republican and socialist, and was first Irish playwright of note to write about the Dublin working classes.

Fianna Éireann had been formed in 1909 by the Bulmer Hobson in Belfast and by Constance Markievicz in Dublin, and later engaged both Pearse and Casement. Hobson was the son in Belfast of a Protestant home-ruler. At age 13 he had had his own subscription to The Shan Van Vocht, and through his English suffragist mother was introduced to Milligan and the Ard Righ set. In 1904, he was inducted into the IRB, and with Ernest Blythe, who at the time had the distinction of being simultaneously a member of the Gaelic League, the IRB and the Orange Order, he helped set up the Protestant-outreach Dungannon Clubs. Named after the Dungannon Convention of 1782, they invoked the memory not only of the old Volunteers but also of the United Irishmen, declaring that: “The Ireland we seek to build is not an Ireland for the Catholic or the Protestant, but an Ireland for every Irishman Irrespective of his creed or class." Among those they persuaded that "the real Irishman is neither essentially a Celt nor essentially a Catholic" was the Belfast-born writer, literary essayist and socialist Robert Wilson Lynd.

In 1911, Hobson was elevated to the IRB's Supreme Council. In July 1914, as secretary to Irish Volunteers, he organised the distribution of the German arms landed at Howth, from the Asgard, a yacht owned amd crewed by the English-born Volunteer Erskine Childers and his American-Irish wife Molly Childers. A week later, a further consignment was landed from the Chotah, at Kilcoole county Wicklow, a boat owned by a prominent nationalist defector from the Anglo-Irish establishment, Sir Thomas Myles.

For IRB, the Irish Volunteers and the ICA, like the Gaelic League (a regular source of recruits from as early as 1903), the Dungannon Clubs and the Fianna Éireann, were "open fronts" in a republican network that the Supreme Council believed they could spring into action when they judged the moment opportune. But in planning the 1916 Easter Rising, Pearse, whom Hobson had sworn into the IRB in December 1913, was engaged in an internal IRB conspiracy (with Connolly included only at the last possible moment). When he learned of Pearse's mobilisation orders, Hobson alerted the Volunteers' chief-of-staff Eoin MacNeill, but was kidnapped to stop him from spreading news of the countermanding order that followed. During the Rising, Hobson went into hiding, re-emerging after the June amnesty, largely to scorn.

Having concluded from his negotiations for further arms, that the Germans were toying with him, Casement had hoped to convince MacNeill (who he believed was still in control of the Volunteers) to call any plans for a rising off. But on his return by U-boat from German he was captured and, after a highly publicised trial for treaso, went to the gallows at Pentonville Prison, 3 August 1916, three months after the summary court-martials of the rebel "ringleaders" in Dublin.

Two of the leaders, who had had positions of command during the Rising, escaped execution: Éamon de Valera, it was widely thought because of his American birth; and Constance Markievicz. Markievicz had been in the middle of the fighting all around St. Stephen's Green, wounding a British army sniper. She was sentenced to death, but the court recommended mercy "solely and only on account of her sex".

Markievicz, née Gore-Booth, the daughter of an Anglo-Irish family with an estate in County Sligo, had associated in Dublin with the leading figures in the literary revival, the Gaelic League and, in time, the IRB. In 1908, she joined Sinn Féin and Inghinidhe na hÉireann ("Daughters of Ireland"), a revolutionary women's movement founded by Maud Gonne, like herself the daughter of Anglo-Irish gentry. After helping found Fianna Éireann in 1909, in which teenage boys were instructed in the paramilitary style of Robert Baden-Powell's Scouts, she had had to rely on the support of Bulmer Hobson to avoid being excluded on the grounds that women did not belong in a physical force movement.

In 1913, while working with the Inghinidhe na hÉireann to assist the locked-out workers and their children, Markievicz joined James Connolly's Irish Citizen Army which, in contrast to the Irish Volunteers, gave women "rank and duty just as if they were men". Her biographer, Seán Ó Faoláin, suggests that, devoted as she was to Connolly, Markievicz "did not understand, and did not try to understand" his socialism. After being released, with de Valera, under the general amnesty she stood for Sinn Féin in the 1918 general election. Returned from Dublin St Patrick's, she was one of the 73 Sinn Féin MPs who constituted themselves as the revolutionary Dáil Éireann with de Valera as President.

=== Pro- and anti-Treatyists ===
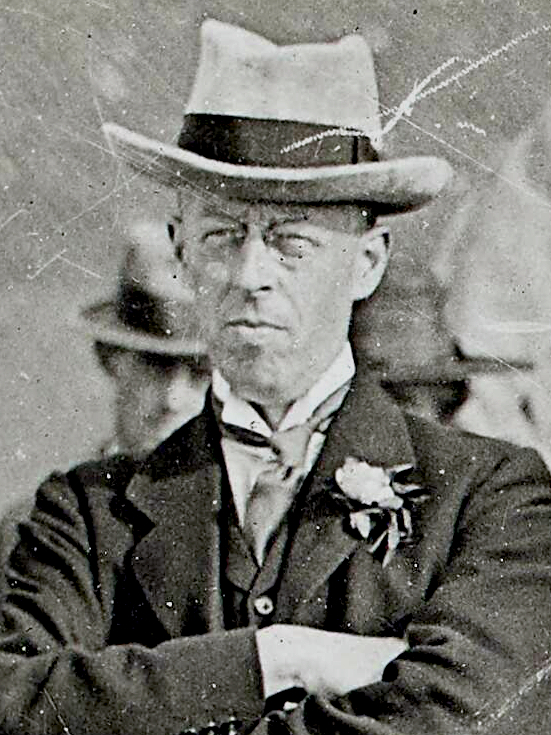
Robert Childers Barton (1881–1975)

Also court-martialed in 1916, having fought under Éamonn Ceannt at the South Dublin Union, was George Irvine from Enniskillen. Until his death a devout Anglican, with Ernest Blythe and Sean O’Casey he had formed what became the Irish [language] Guild of the Church of Ireland, and, as an IRB man, led the guild's republican takeover. After being amnestied, Irvine was selected in 1918 as the Sinn Féin candidate for North Fermanagh but his nomination was successfully blocked by local AOH. He was imprisoned for his opposition to the Anglo-Irish Treaty, and was later to protest the Catholic ethos of the dominion-status, twenty-six county, Irish Free State it created. In a letter to the press in 1940, Irvine insisted that, given the loyalty of generations of Catholic leaders to the Crown, the struggle of Irish independence "owes a lot to protestants, and the spirit of protestantism".

Combined with the conscription crisis that followed, the Rising and the execution of its leaders had a profound effect upon initially hostile public opinion. Among those personally affected were Erskine Childer's cousins, Robert Childers Barton and David Lubbock Robinson. As a British officer on duty in Dublin, Barton had contact with many of the imprisoned leaders. He resigned his commission, joined the IRB, and in the 1918 general election was returned as the Sinn Féin member for Wicklow West. After imprisonment during the War of Independence, he was a signatory in London to the Treaty.

Robinson, a veteran of the trenches, opposed the Treaty and fought on the Republican side in the Civil War. He was present in Annamoe, County Wicklow when Childers was arrested by Free State Troops and taken to Dublin which would result in his court-martial and execution. As publicity director for the Dáil, Childers had helped bring the British to the negotiating table in 1921 by advertising the growing strength of pro-nationalist opinion in the United States, but, with de Valera, he had rejected the final compromise. Robinson was himself arrested in 1922 and spent forty days on hunger strike during his eighteen months' internment in Mountjoy Prison.

The Treaty was also opposed by Dr. Kathleen Lynn, daughter of a Church of Ireland clergyman in County Mayo. Deeply affected by the poverty and disease she had witnessed as a child, she trained as a doctor and, working alongside James Connolly during the Dublin lock-out, became the chief medical officer of the Irish Citizen Army. In 1916, following the loss of their officer in charge, Sean Connolly, with Helena Maloney she had assumed command of the insurgents at Dublin's City Hall. In 1923, Lynn was elected an abstentionist TD for North Dublin, but the failure of republicans to embrace social reform drove her from politics. She devoted herself to St. Ultans, the children's hospital she had established in 1919.

Despite his signature on the Treaty, de Valera's Fianna Fáil, victors in the 1932 Irish general election, elevated Barton to the Senate. There he was joined by Ernest Blythe for the new-formed Fine Gael, a party in which Blythe had sought, unsuccessfully, to effect an alliance between his colleagues in the previous Cumann na nGaedheal government and pro-Treaty war veterans organised in the fascist-style Blueshirt ranks of Eoin O'Duffy. Among other Protestant Sinn Féiners who had supported the Treaty were authors of the 1922 Free State constitution, first deputy chair of the Senate James G. Douglas and Howth gunrunner Darrell Figgis.

=== North American envoys ===
After his pursuit of reconciliation with nationalist Ireland forced him out of the Independent Orange Order in 1908, Robert Lindsay Crawford emigrated to North America where, in 1918, he was among the Protestant Friends of Irish Freedom in New York. Introduced as "a stout-hearted son of Ulster", in April 1920 he appeared on a Clan-na-Gael platform in the city with de Valera, and he subsequently toured Canada as the president of the Self Determination for Ireland League. Encountering sometimes violent Orange Order opposition, he insisted that the fight for Irish self-determination was neither "racial nor religious in its origin" and he avoided declaring publicly for the republic. From 1922, Crawford served the Irish Free State as New York consul.

In 1920, de Valera was also joined on platforms in New York, and on an Irish bond drive through the American south, by James Alexander Hamilton Irwin, the Presbyterian minister for Killead, Country Antrim. Irwin had endorsed the liberal home-rule resolutions of Rev. Armour's Ballymoney meeting, but in the wake the 1916 Rising embraced the republican cause. He assured American audiences that "if Britain would withdraw her present army of occupation not one hair upon the head of a man, woman or child would be injured in any part of Ireland,”

On his return to Northern Ireland, Irwin was detained two weeks on a weapons charge (reportedly, possession of a 1798 blunderbuss). From 1935, he ministered in Lucan, County Dublin, and from 1945 until his death in 1954 served on Fianna Fáil's National Executive. He declined an offer from the party to stand for the Presidency of Ireland.

== Post-partition ==
=== Belfast Connellyites ===
In addition to Markievicz, Sinn Féin nominated one other woman in the 1918 election. With no prospect of topping the poll, Winifred Carney, supported by Alice Milligan, stood in Belfast Victoria. Carney, the Catholic daughter of a mixed marriage, had been Connolly's personal, as well as union-branch, secretary, in Belfast, and had been his adjutant throughout the Easter week fighting in Dublin. In 1924, she joined the militant Court branch of the Northern Ireland Labour Party (NILP). The party acknowledged the reality of partition and of a Belfast parliament but without any profession of loyalty. It was an equivocation on the national question—a "pragmatic silence"— that allowed for an uneasy co-operation between Connellyites and those who, despite its refusal to organise in Northern Ireland, continued to look to the Labour Party in Britain.

Belfast Socialists walking behind "Break the Connection with Capitalism" banner, Tone Memorial, Bodenstown, 1934.

In the NILP, Carney met, and eventually married, George McBride. A working-class Protestant from the Shankill Road, McBride was Ulster Volunteer and war veteran, who had emerged from the experience of the western trenches as an internationalist and atheist. Carney was never able to persuade him that the deaths of Easter week "had been worth it", but he shared her respect for Connolly's socialism. The couple were part of the organising committee for the Outdoor Relief protests that brought thousands of Protestant and Catholic working people out onto the streets in 1932. The following year, they joined the NILP affiliate, the Socialist Party of Northern Ireland, a mainly Protestant organisation, with around 150 members in the Shankill Road and Ballymacarrett districts of Belfast.

In 1934, with other party members, and with Jack White, Carney and McBride joined a contingent of 200 Belfast Protestants, organised in James Connolly Republican Clubs, at the annual Wolfe Tone commemoration at Bodenstown. The clubs were an initiative of the popular front Republican Congress, promoted by, among others, the Anti-Treaty veteran George Gilmore, a Dublin Protestant, and within the NILP by Victor Halley and William McMullen. On the approach to Tone's graveside, the visitors were forcibly blocked by members of Tipperary IRA who objected to the "red", "Break The Connection with Capitalism", banner. The banner, which had been that carried by founder members of the Ballymacarrett club, Jim Straney and William Tumilson (a Protestant who had joined the Short Strand IRA), was unfurled later that day at the graveside of James Connolly at Arbour Hill in Dublin. According to The Irish Times, the 36 members of the Shankill Road James Connolly Republican Club attending described themselves as "the vanguard of Protestant workers entering into active participation in the fight for an Irish Workers' Republic".

The "experiment of Protestant working men taking art in a pilgrimage to Tone's grave was not repeated". The following year, Twelfth celebrations triggered deadly riots and workplace expulsions in Belfast that targeted not only Catholics but also "rotten Prods" – Protestants whose labour/left politics disregarded sectarian distinctions. It was a sectarian logic that extended itself to the interpretation of darkening events in Europe. Contesting the Dock constituency in 1938, NILP leader Harry Midgley, who had sided with Connolly in his debates with unionist labour before the war, and on the eve of partition had continued to press for all-Ireland home rule, found his support for the anti-clerical Spanish Republic regarded as another instance of "No Popery!" Catholic crowds disrupted his rallies with chants of "Remember Spain" and "We want Franco." Unable to accept Irish neutrality in the face of "Nazi-Fascist totalitarianism", he formed the Commonwealth Labour Party, which proved to a path to his entry into the wartime Unionist government.

In 1944, with other Protestant trade unionists in west Belfast, Halley had joined Nationalist Party dissidents around Harry Diamond, and ex IRA volunteers, in re-founding a Socialist Republican Party. In 1945, Jack White (declaring opposition to the ”Orange Order, the Unionist Party and the Special Powers Act") died before testing his candidacy for the party in Mid Antrim. After losing to the NILP in a 1946 Belfast Central, with Diamond, Halley sought to persuade the Irish Labour Party to organise north of the border. Jack Beattie remained with the NILP. Targeted for accepting support from the Anti-Partition League, in the 1949 Northern Ireland general election, he campaigned in Protestant east Belfast wearing a steel helmet.

=== Anti-partitionists ===
The Limerick born lead writer for the Freeman's Journal, James Winder Good, reluctantly accepted the 26-county settlement. Like others, he believed that "hard" economic facts would "open the eyes" of northern unionists to "the drawbacks of Partition". Criticising Irish economic policy from a Keynesian perspective, Bulmer Hobson spent his last years arguing that the hard facts did not favour unity. Denis Ireland, the Belfast son of a Protestant mill owner, drew broadly the same conclusion. De Valera, he wrote, had failed "to see [independence] through". In his otherwise assertive 1937 constitution, the Fianna Fáil leader had made no provision or commitment to exercise "the power to control National Credit and Currency." The Irish pound, and consequently the monetary policy effective within the state, continued to be regulated to Ireland's detriment by the Bank of England ("the witch-doctors of Threadneedle Street") and the City of London.

Denis Ireland was clear that his advocacy of greater "economic democracy" did not define him as a socialist (like Maud Gonne, he was a disciple, rather, of the social credit philosophy of C. H. Douglas) and that it did not bring him into line with the post-war Labour-majority in Westminster. He was an active member of the Anti-Partition League, which in 1941 he had sought to assist with the creation in Belfast of the Ulster Union Club. Intended (like the Dungannon Clubs) to "recapture for Ulster Protestants their true tradition as Irishmen," it advertised a range of activities including discussions and lectures on current affairs, economics, history and the Irish language, and it published number of pamphlets.

The Ulster Union Club was discovered to be a source of recruits to the Irish Republican Army. Meetings were being attended by John Graham, a Church of Ireland devout who at the time of his arrest in 1942 (following a gun battle with the RUC) was leading a "Protestant squad", an intelligence unit, that was preparing the armed organisation for a new "northern campaign." Along with George Gilmore and George Plant (executed by the Irish government in 1942 for the murder of a suspected informer), Graham had been amongst a handful of Protestants who had come to the IRA through a split in the Republican Congress. In 1944, under Northern Ireland Special Powers Act, the club was suppressed. Its premises, and the homes of Ireland and other prominent members (among them Presbyterian clergymen, teachers and university lecturers) were raided by RUC Special Branch.

In 1948, with Victor Halley, Ireland organised a 150th-year commemoration in Belfast of the 1798 Rebellion. Barred from the city centre, the commemoration crowd of 30,000 gathered in nationalist west Belfast where they heard Halley declare: "The people who destroyed Tone in Ireland were those who feared the Protestant tradition of association with America, French Republicanism, Freedom and Democracy".

In 1948 Denis Ireland entered the Seanad Éireann, the Irish Senate, for Clann na Poblachta. As a senator, Ireland was the first member of the Oireachtas, the Irish Parliament, to be resident in Northern Ireland. From his home in south Belfast, he lived to witness the onset of the Northern Ireland Troubles. Listening in 1972 to intermittent rifle-fire from the Falls Road in republican west Belfast, he wrote: "The shots did not begin in Belfast; they reached Belfast from the background of Irish history, all the way back to the battle of Kinsale".

== During, and after, the Troubles ==
=== Constitutional nationalists ===
Arising out of the bi-centenary celebrations of Wolfe Tone's birth in 1963, left-leaning elements of the IRA formed the Wolfe Tone Societies. A key figure, with a Presbyterian background in Tyrone, was Roy Johnston. A Marxist, he argued for a national liberation strategy to unite the Catholic and Protestant working class, using democratic means, in the first instance, to challenge the Unionist regime in Northern Ireland.

In August 1966, a Wolfe Tone Society conference in Maghera, County Londonderry, proposed a civil rights campaign. The IRA's Chief of Staff Cathal Goulding was present and pledged support. A further meeting in Belfast in January 1967 saw the formation of the Northern Ireland Civil Rights Association. Its executive council included to trade unionists, communists, liberals, socialists, and republicans, and a Young Unionist Robin Cole. It was chaired by Betty Sinclair, a Communist Party veteran of the 1932 Outdoor Relief protests. As paramilitary, and state security-force, violence escalated, Sinclair and other non-republicans withdrew, conceding direction to Goulding's Official IRA-aligned faction until, in the wake of Bloody Sunday, the association ceased its work.

Leading NICRA's participation in the anti-internment march in Derry on 30 January 1972, that the Parachute Regiment, killing fourteen unarmed civilians, turned into Bloody Sunday, was Ivan Cooper. Cooper, born into a working-class Anglican family in Claudy, County Londonderry, had urged Catholics and Protestants in the summer of 1968 to fight together for their rights "as the blacks in America were fighting". In the 1969 general election, he was elected as an independent member of the Parliament of Northern Ireland for Mid Londonderry, defeating the sitting Nationalist Party MP.

In August 1970, with John Hume, who as an independent had defeated the Nationalist leader Eddie McAteer in Foyle, and four other Stormont MPs—Gerry Fitt, (Republican Labour), Austin Currie (Nationalist), Paddy Devlin (Northern Ireland Labour), and Paddy O’Hanlon (Independent) —Cooper co-founded the Social Democratic and Labour Party (SDLP). While committed to "eventual" Irish unification, this would be on the basis of "the consent of the majority of the people in the North and in the South". As a Protestant, Cooper was presented by Hume as evidence of the party's non-sectarian bona fides, proof that "the important issue" for the party was "human rights not religion".

After an election in June 1973 of a new Northern Ireland Assembly, in which the SDLP emerged as the sole representatives of the nationalist community, Cooper and his colleagues agreed to enter into a "power-sharing" government with Unionists. With former Prime Minister, Brian Faulkner, as chief executive, Gerry Fitt as his deputy, and Cooper as minister for community relations, the coalition took office on 1 January 1974. By the end of May it had collapsed and the Assembly was dissolved in face of a paramilitary-supported loyalist general strike.

By the end of the 1970s, Devlin and Fitt had resigned from the SDLP, both arguing that in the executive the party had sacrificed the trust necessary to imbed power-sharing in the reckless pursuit of a cross-border Council of Ireland. According to Fitt, it had gone "too green", and become simply a "Catholic nationalist party". Cooper remained, until 1983 boundary changes for the new Foyle constituency persuaded him to step aside in favour of Hume.

There was no other Protestant to take Cooper's place in the leading ranks of the party. John Turnley, scion of a wealthy Protestant family and a former British Army officer, had joined in SDLP in 1972. In 1975 he was elected for the party to the Northern Ireland Constitutional Convention, and in 1977 to Larne council. But disillusioned with the party, in late 1977 he co-founded the Irish Independence Party with Frank McManus and Fergus McAteer, and became a leading member of the National H-Blocks Committee supporting the IRA blanket protest. He was assassinated by the loyalist Ulster Defence Association in 1980.

=== Republicans ===
Jim Kerr, born into a middle-class Protestant family in Enniscorthy, County Wexford, joined the IRA in the late 1930s and was interned at the Curragh Camp during World War II. After Nazi Germany invaded the Soviet Union in June 1941, like other left-wing IRA members he signed himself out to join the Royal Air Force (RAF). Kerr was active in the IRA Border Campaign of the late 1950s and became a close ally of young IRA member Seamus Costello. In 1974, Kerr, then a member of the Ard Comhairle of Official Sinn Féin, left with others to form the Irish Republican Socialist Party (IRSP) and the Irish National Liberation Army (INLA). In 1975, Kerr, was arrested on explosives charges and went on the run in continental Europe. There he built ties with left-wing militant groups and allegedly helped procure weapons from the Palestinian Liberation Organisation.

Ronnie Bunting, son of Ronald Bunting, a close associate of Ian Paisley, became a member of the Official IRA in the early 1970s and was also a founder-member of the INLA. Like Turnley, he was assassinated by the UDA in 1980. Ronald Spence, whose father Edward Spence had joined the Communist Party and married a Catholic, in the mid-1970s served a sentence on the INLA wing of the Maze prison while his uncle, Gusty Spence, was OC on the Ulster Volunteer Force wing.

Noel Jenkinson, a Protestant from a County Meath, emigrated to London in the 1950s and became involved in communist and Maoist politics. In 1969 he joined the Official IRA in London and in 1972 he was sentenced to thirty years in prison for the bombing of the headquarters of the 16th Parachute Brigade in retaliation for Bloody Sunday. In 1974, David Russell, a Presbyterian from Ramelton in Donegal, was accidentally killed in Derry by the premature explosion of a bomb he was placing for the Provisional IRA. Tom Berry, an Official IRA volunteer from Protestant east Belfast was killed by the Provisionals during the intra-republican feud in 1975. Harry Murray, who was shunned by his Tiger's Bay community after marrying a Catholic, volunteered with the Provisionals, assassinated a policeman in 1978 and was later involved hunger strikes and prison breaks.

The experience in 1969 of the Belfast to Derry People's Democracy march ambushed at Burntollet Bridge, and later, in 1971, of being arrested and interned, drew John McGuffin, a professed anarchist (and son of a Labour Unionist Stormont MP) into republican circles. Although he denounced the Provisional IRA for the deaths and injuries on Bloody Friday (1972), under the pseudonym "the Brigadier", from 1974 to 1981 he contributed a regular column to An Phoblacht in which he satirised the British army and their understanding of the communities they patrolled.

=== Since the 1998 Belfast Agreement ===
Accompanied by paramilitary ceasefires and a withdrawal of British troops to barracks, the 1998 Belfast, or Good Friday, Agreement re-established a devolved Northern Ireland Assembly and Executive. Its principles of compulsory coalition, and of privileging unionist and nationalist blocs by requiring their parallel consent, has been criticised for reinforcing, rather than unwinding, sectarian political division. All the current representatives of the unionist parties are Protestant, all those of the SDLP and Sinn Féin, and of People Before Profit (a party that supports the reunification of Ireland while rejecting the designation of "unionist" and "nationalist" in the Assembly) are of Catholic background.

There was the anomalous case of Billy Leonard, a former Seventh-day Adventist lay-preacher and Royal Ulster Constabulary reservist, whose wife and children are Catholics. He was elected in 2001 to Coleraine Borough Council as an SDLP representative for the Skerries area. Citing insufficient emphasis on Irish unity, he switched to Sinn Féin in 2004. The party nominated him as an MLA for East Londonderry in 2010. But among other disagreements, he complained that "the tentacles of the [IRA] Army Council still run throughout" the republican party, and resigned.

When Tánaiste, Leo Varadkar claimed, in 2021, that Sinn Féin had no Protestants representing the party either north or south, he was corrected by Violet-Anne Wynne, Sinn Féin TD (member of the Dáil) for Clare: "I am a Protestant and I am proud to be a Sinn Féin TD." The following year, citing "psychological warfare" conducted against her within the local party organisation, Wynne resigned from Sinn Féin and served as an independent.
