= Denis Ireland =

Irish politician and essayist (1894–1974)

Senator
- In office 21 April 1948 – 14 August 1951
- Constituency: Nominated by the Taoiseach

Personal details
- Born: 29 July 1894 Belfast, Ireland
- Died: 23 September 1974 (aged 80) Belfast, Northern Ireland
- Party: Ulster Union Club; Anti-Partition League; Clann na Poblachta
- Spouse: Mary Hawthorne (m. 1957)
- Education: Queen's University Belfast
- Occupation: Political essayist and activist

Military service
- Allegiance: Royal Irish Fusiliers
- Rank: Captain

Denis Liddell Ireland (29 July 1894 – 23 September 1974) was an Irish essayist and political activist. A northern Protestant, after service in World War I he embraced the cause of Irish independence. He also advanced the social credit ideas of C. H. Douglas. In Belfast, his efforts to encourage Protestants in the exploration of Irish identity and interest were set back when in 1942 his Ulster Union Club was found to have been infiltrated by a successful recruiter for the Irish Republican Army. In Dublin, where he argued economic policy had failed to "see independence through," he entered Seanad Éireann, the Irish Senate, in 1948 for the republican and social-democratic Clann na Poblachta. He was the first member of the Oireachtas, the Irish Parliament, to be resident in Northern Ireland.

== Early years ==
Ireland was born in Malone Park, Belfast, the son of a linen manufacturer, Adam Liddell Ireland (recalled as "a mild-mannered man ... who rarely took time off from the office for anything except funerals") and Isabella Ireland (née McHinch). He was educated at the Royal Belfast Academical Institution, the Perse School in Cambridge, and at Queen's University Belfast. With the outbreak of World War I in 1914, he joined the Royal Irish Fusiliers, serving on the Western and Macedonian fronts. Invalided home with the rank of captain, he decided against resuming his medical studies. These seemed to him of "little use" in a city whose textile mills ground "the life out of [working people] almost as effectively as the creeping barrages blew the lives . . . out of the cannon-fodder at the front."

Instead, he chose to represent the family's linen business from London, marketing its wares to department stores in the West End and overseas. The opportunity this accorded him for travel in Europe and in North America provoked a writing talent that Ireland began to apply in earnest from 1930 working freelance and as a writer for the BBC.

== Engaging the "Irish dimension" ==
At the BBC in Belfast Ireland joined John Boyd and Sam Hanna Bell who "struggled, often successfully, to challenge the quietist conservatism of the institution and the resultant refusal to engage with the Irish dimension." While he allowed that it might be "easier for the proverbial camel to pass through the eye of a needle than for a son of the Ulster Protestant industrial ascendancy to orient himself in relation to his country's history," Ireland believed that for his co-religionists the task held the promise of a "renaissance."

He wrote of W. B. Yeats in 1893 visiting Belfast "just long enough to give us industrial dwarfs and gnomes of the wee black North a hint of things that did be happening beyond the end of our horse-tram line, our black regiments of factory chimneys, our smug wee red-brick villas in the red-brick suburbs." Yet, in "a town which, paradoxically enough, regularly reared (and then promptly expelled) writers, artists, and unpractical 'dreamers' of all kinds," Ireland believed that, if only he would abandon his "present attitude of life-negation," the Ulster Presbyterian could prove "the real juggler with metaphysical subtleties, the dreamer, and the potential liberator of Irish art and literature." This debilitating "attitude", in Ireland's view, expressed itself not least in the Ulsterman's determination to centre his patriotic enthusiasm on London, a city where the "first rule" in the reception of things Irish is the obliteration of historical record. Ireland regarded as "natural" West-End acclaim for Denis Johnston's "sentimental serio-comic" The Moon in the Yellow River (a plot involving an IRA attempt to blow up a Free State government power plant): "If I have bullied a man, wrecked his home, stolen his goods, and traduced his culture, it is only natural that I should go about asserting that he is really astray in the head."

While he disdained his then party leader, David Lloyd George ("this little Welsh opportunist" who "let loose the Black and Tans in Ireland immediately after a war waged on behalf of democracy and the rights of small nations"), in the 1929 Westminster general election Ireland had stood (unsuccessfully) as a Liberal in Belfast East.

== Anti-Partitionist ==
To "recapture for Ulster Protestants their true tradition as Irishmen," in 1941 Ireland founded the Ulster Union Club. It advertised a range of activities including weekly discussions and lectures on current affairs, economics, history and the Irish language, as well as dancing and music classes. A number of pamphlets were published and under its auspices, Ireland contributed to various magazines, newspapers and radio programmes in Belfast and Dublin.

The Ulster Union Club was mainly frequented by Protestants but, as the authorities soon discovered, it was a source of recruits to the Irish Republican Army. UUC meetings were being attended by John Graham, a Church of Ireland devout who at the time of his arrest in 1942 was leading a "Protestant squad", an intelligence unit, that was preparing the armed organisation for a new "northern campaign."

When, in April 1942, an RUC officer, Patrick Murphy, a Catholic father of nine, was shot in an exchange (the battle of Cawnpore Street), six members of the IRA's Belfast Brigade were sentenced to hang. It was an unprecedented step for the Northern Ireland authorities who even in the violence of the 1920s and 1930s had never executed an Irish Republican. With Labour, Communist and trade-union support, Ireland and the UUC mounted a reprieve campaign. In the event the sentences of all but one of the six were commuted. In September, Tom Williams (aged 19) was hanged. Denis Ireland had also been active in an anti-conscription campaign. In April 1941 (two weeks after the first Belfast Blitz), The Irish Press reports a meeting attended by 10,000 men, at which "Captain Ireland" announced (in a reference to the United Irishmen) that "after 150 years Catholics and Protestant are once more united on the fundamental issue."

In 1944, under Northern Ireland Special Powers Act, the Ulster Union Club was suppressed. The club's premises, and the homes of Ireland and other prominent members (among them Presbyterian clergymen, teachers and university lecturers) were raided by RUC Special Branch. Evidently there was not the material to suggest that Ireland was complicit in, or less shocked than other club members by, the activities of Graham and his comrades. (Ireland, however, is identified as the possible source of Laurie Green's familiarity with the Belfast IRA in his novel, and subsequent film, Odd Man Out).

In June 1947, it was still as "President of the Ulster Union Club" that "Captain Ireland" was introduced to an Anti-Partition meeting in New York by the city's Mayo-born Mayor William O'Dwyer. For the Unionist authorities further provocation followed. Ireland organised a 150th-year commemoration of the United Irish Rebellion for Belfast city centre. The rally was banned, but so too, exceptionally, were Loyalist counter-demonstrations triggering outrage from, among others, a young Ian Paisley.

In 1948, along with trade unionists Harold Binks, Victor Halley and Jack MacGougan, Ireland was member of the Belfast 1798 Commemoration Commiitee. After being denied access to the city centre, they rallied 30,000 in Corrigan Park in nationalist west Belfast, paraded up Cavehill to McArt's Fort where in 1795 Wolfe Tone and members of the United Irish northern executive took their celebrated oath "never to desist in our efforts until we had subverted the authority of England over our country".

== Social credit advocate ==
Divisions between North and South, Protestant and Catholic, were not the only limitations upon Irish independence that exercised Ireland. In the same wartime year Ireland established the Ulster Union Club, he published Éamon de Valera Doesn't See it Through: A Study of Irish Politics in the Machine Age, a collection of his articles appearing over the previous two years in the New Northman, The Ulsterman, the Standard and, less obscurely, the New English Weekly. He argued:

Irishmen are beginning to wake from the dream wherein green letterboxes, green postage stamps, and income-tax forms copied from the English but containing a few Gaelic words, appeared as symbols of nationality, whereas they are in reality a convenient cover for the operation of Western Finance Capital in its most international and dangerous form.

As he readily owned, Ireland had become a disciple of the distributive philosophy of C. H. Douglas. This called upon national governments to assume precisely that power that in his otherwise assertive 1937 constitution, de Valera had made no provision or commitment to exercise: "the power to control National Credit and Currency." The Irish pound, and consequently the monetary policy effective within the state, continued to be regulated by the Bank of England ("the witch-doctors of Threadneedle Street") and the "City" of London. As had Keynes in his General Theory of Employment, Interest and Money (1936), Ireland dismissed as "totally fallacious" the conventional analogy between individual and national budgets. A private individual is forced to balance his budget for "the excellent reason" that he cannot, literally, "make money."

A "State" or national sovereignty, on the other hand, had at one time the power of "making" and putting into circulation as much money as was necessary for the health and prosperity of its citizens, and even nowadays, when this power of economic life and death has been handed to a race of (presumably) Supermen know as "bankers," the State is still occasionally allowed to print off any hypothetical number of millions required for the purposes of war and destruction, or any other activity which happens to consolidate the position of the bankers--but never for the purpose of providing its citizens with vulgar matters like food, boots, and clothing.

The argument was for a system of "social credit" or "national dividend." Payments to citizens would redress the otherwise chronic lag in "the machine-age" between their capacity to consume and the "productive capacity" of industry. In a "world of artificial scarcity," Ireland believed that it was to this "Economic Democracy" that the "idea of nationalism, the most powerful force in the modern world," must eventually turn. The alternative was fascism.

Notwithstanding their redistributive logic, Ireland was clear that these ideas did not define him as a socialist, and that they did not bring him into line with what many in 1945 saw as the nearest prospect of political reform and progress in Northern Ireland, the new Labour-majority in Westminster. He cautioned the readers of Belfast's nationalist daily, Irish News, that their Labour "friends" are "friends of Ireland only in order that the Irish can be turned into good little Socialists like themselves." In the 1945 election the party's Friends of Ireland had been seen to endorse a candidate of the Northern Ireland Labour Party—to the fury of the Anti-Partition League.

Ireland described his own position as "nationalist, and in the deepest sense, liberal."

== Irish Senator ==
In 1948, he was nominated to the Seanad Éireann in Dublin by the Taoiseach John A. Costello. Together with another Ulsterman, Patrick McCartan, his name had been put forward by the Minister of External Affairs, Clann na Poblachta leader Seán MacBride. Denis Ireland was not the first Northern Ireland Protestant to serve in the Oireachtas (Ernest Blythe had been a minister in successive Free State cabinets) but he was the first member to be a Northern-Ireland resident. MacBride's mother, Maud Gonne, had also embraced Douglas's ideas. In 1932 she had been a founder member in Dublin of the Financial Freedom Federation, renamed the Social Credit Party 1935. It had had no electoral impact.

While a Senator (1948–1951), Ireland was Irish representative to the Council of Europe. On the council, he supported MacBride in the leading role he was to play in securing ratification of the European Convention on Human Rights, (as well in his inevitable attempt to raise with Britain's European partners "the Irish question"). However, while he participated on the council, Ireland disclaimed being that "type of 'progressive' calling himself as 'internationalist,'" and still less as a proponent of federal union--"the curious belief that a problem is solved by enlarging it." Such faith as he might have had in international institutions he suggests was lost "in the interval between Acts One and Two of the World War" in that "Grand Palace of Illusion," The League of Nations.

== Linen-Hall circle ==
From the thirties Ireland was one of a set of Linen Hall Library members who would repair regularly to Campbell's Cafe. Since its foundation in 1792 as the Belfast Society for Promoting Knowledge, membership of the library was "de rigueur for lay scholars and apprentice artists in the city." The regulars, at various points, included writers John Boyd, Sam Hanna Bell and Richard Rowley, actors Joseph Tomelty, Jack Loudon and J. G. Devlin, poets John Hewitt and Robert Greacen, artists Padraic Woods, Gerald Dillon, and William Conor and (an outspoken opponent of sectarianism) the Rev. Arthur Agnew. The ebullient atmosphere the circle created was a backdrop the appearance of Campbell's Cafe in Brian Moore's wartime Bildungsroman, The Emperor of Ice-Cream.

== Listening to rifle fire from the Falls Road ==
From his home in "tree-embowered" South Belfast ("faubourg Malone"), Ireland lived to witness the onset of the Northern Ireland Troubles. Listening in 1972 to intermittent rifle-fire from the Falls Road in republican West Belfast, he wrote:

"[t]he shots did not begin in Belfast; they reached Belfast from the background of Irish history, all the way back to the battle of Kinsale. . . . Light had been thrown on that subject in a conversation in a Dublin cafe when a friend --a one-time Gaelic speaker from Connemara-- told me what his grandmother said to him about Irish politics, presumably in Irish. 'In Ireland the extreme party is always right.' A bitter verdict."

== List of works ==
- 1930 – An Ulster Protestant Looks At His World: A Critical Commentary on Contemporary Irish Politics (Belfast: Dorman & Co.), 86pp.
- 1931 – Ulster to-day and to-morrow, her part in a Gaelic civilization: a study in political re-evolution (London: Hogarth Press)
- 1935 – Portraits and Sketches (Belfast: Vortex Press). 103pp.
- 1936 – Theobald Wolfe Tone: Patriot Adventurer (extracts from the memoirs and journals of Wolfe Tone, selected and arranged with a connective narrative) (London: Rich & Cowan) 144pp.
- 1936 – From the Irish Shore: Notes on My Life and Times (London Rich & Cowan), 244pp.
- 1939 – Statutes Round the City Hall (London: Cresset Press), 298pp.
- 1941 – Éamon de Valera Doesn't See it Through: A Study of Irish Politics in the Machine Age (Cork: Forum Press), 62pp.
- 1944 – The Age of Unreason: A Short History of Democracy in Our Times (Dublin: Corrigan & Wilson), 34pp.
- 1945 – Letters from Ireland (Belfast: Ulster Union Club)
- 1947 – Six Counties in Search of a Nation, Essays and Letters on Partition 1942-1946 (Belfast: Irish News), 108pp.
- 1950 – Red Brick City and Its Dramatist: A Note on St. John Ervine, in Envoy, 1 (March), pp. 59–67
- 1952 – (with Niall Ó Dónaill) Cathair phrotastúnach [Protestant City], (Dublin: Coisceim 1996)
- 1973 – From the Jungle of Belfast: Footnotes to History 1904-1972 (Belfast: Blackstaff), 175pp.

Ireland attempted at least one work of fiction: Geda and George C. Marroo (Belfast: Vortex [1935]), 103pp.
