= Jack Macgougan =

Jack Macgougan (21 August 1913 – 12 December 1998) was a labour, socialist and Irish republican activist in Belfast, Northern Ireland, and a President of the Irish Congress of Trade Unions.

Born in Belfast to a Protestant family, Macgougan became an active trade unionist at an early age. In 1935 he was elected Secretary of the Socialist Party of Northern Ireland, a Northern Ireland Labour Party-affiliate split from the Independent Labour Party (NILP).

In 1934, along with Victor Halley, Jack White and other northern trade unionists and socialists, he attended the convention in Athlone that established the broad "anti-imperialist" Republican Congress, an initiative of a left split from the Irish Republican Army. From 1936 he was active, alongside Betty Sinclair, Winifred Carney, Halley and others, in organising relief aid for the Spanish Republic in civil war with Franco.

In the 1938 Northern Ireland general election, he stood for the NILP in Belfast Oldpark, taking second place, with 40.8% of the vote. In 1945, he was appointed Irish Regional Organiser of the National Union of Tailors and Garment Workers (NUTGW).

Macgougan was Chair of the NILP in 1945–1946, but became unhappy with its increasingly unionist stance. Along with Halley and Harry Diamond he supported the establishment of the Irish Labour Party in Northern Ireland. In 1949, he was elected for the party to Belfast City Council. He later stood unsuccessfully for the party in South Down at the 1950 general election (the Anti-Partition League decided not to oppose him, but priests denounced him as a communist) and Belfast Falls at the 1953 Northern Ireland general election. He lost his council seat in 1958. That year, he served as President of the Irish Trades Union Congress and, in 1965, he became President of its merger with the Congress of Irish Unions, the Irish Congress of Trades Unions. In 1969, he became General Secretary of the UK-wide NUTGW, and also served on the General Council of the British Trades Union Congress.

In 1948, along with Halley and the writer and Anti-Partition League speaker Denis Ireland, MacGougan Ireland was member of the Belfast 1798 Commemoration Commiitee. After being denied access to the city centre, they rallied 30,000 in Corrigan Park in nationalist west Belfast. MacGougan reminded the crowd that the United Irish leader "Wolfe Tone was an advocate of the new social forces that arose in all parts of the world" and that when they paid tribute to the United Irishmen they were to remember that "they had the closest fraternal links with the democratic forces in other countries".

MacGougan retired to Milton Keynes in England where he died on 14 December 1998.

Party political offices
Preceded by William Leeburn	Chair of the Northern Ireland Labour Party; 1945–1946	Succeeded by John Boyle
Trade union offices
Preceded by Norman Kennedy	President of the Irish Trades Union Congress; 1958	Succeeded by Walter Carpenter
Preceded by W. J. Fitzpatrick	President of the Irish Congress of Trade Unions; 1963	Succeeded by Charles McCarthy
Preceded by John E. Newton	General Secretary of the National Union of Tailors and Garment Workers; 1969–1979	Succeeded by Alec Smith
Preceded by John E. Newton	Clothing Group representative on the General Council of the TUC; 1970–1979	Succeeded by Alec Smith
