= James Kirker =

American frontiersman

James Kirker (1793–1852) was an Irish-born American privateer, soldier, mercenary, merchant, Mountain man, and scalp hunter. He is best known for his contracts with the Mexican government to enslave, kill and scalp Apache Indians.

James Kirker (signed Don Santiago at bottom of photo) 1847, by Thomas Martin Easterly

== Early life ==
Kirker was born in Killead, County Antrim, Northern Ireland, to an Ulster Scots family, but left for New York City, United States, at the age of 16 to avoid conscription in the Royal Navy. In an ironic twist, he became a "legal" American privateer to raid British ships off the East Coast of the United States in the War of 1812. He was a privateer for a year, but returned to New York in 1813 and married Catherine Donigan and had a son, James B. Kirker. In 1817, Kirker abandoned his family to go to St. Louis, Missouri with several kinsmen. In St. Louis, Kirker worked as a merchant.

In 1822, Kirker joined a William Henry Ashley fur trapping expedition up the Missouri River. In 1824, he followed the Santa Fe Trail to New Mexico and spent winters during the next decade trapping and trading beaver pelts in the southern Rocky Mountains. He began working at the Santa Rita mine near Silver City, New Mexico in 1826 and escorted wagon trains of copper to Chihuahua, Mexico. In 1833, without divorcing his first wife, he married Rita Garcia and in 1835 he became a Mexican citizen. The couple had three sons and a daughter. He became known in Mexico as Santiago Querque or Quirque.

Kirker is described as a "large, agile man," fearless, an excellent marksman and horseman. He was considered during his lifetime as having "great enterprise and vision."

== Mercenary ==
Kirker had become familiar and friendly with the Apache during his years of work and travel. He sold arms and ammunition to them and was alleged to have accompanied Apache bands on livestock raids into Mexico. Beginning in 1831, Apache raids became a serious problem in the Mexican states of Chihuahua and Sonora. In December 1839, Kirker was given a contract by the government of Chihuahua to fight Apaches. He was authorized to raise 200 men and would be paid for Apache prisoners. The core group of his force was about 25 men, called "Sahuanos" (Shawnees) which included Anglos, Mexicans, escaped Black slaves and Shawnee, Delaware, and Creek Indians, including his second in command, a Shawnee named Spybuck.

Kirker's first operation in 1840 was to kill 10 Apache men and take 20 women and children prisoners from a group that had begun peace negotiations with Mexican authorities. He continued to have some successes killing and capturing Apache, but Apache raids increased in 1841 rather than decreased. Kirker was reemployed in 1846 and he and local Mexicans were responsible for a massacre of 130 peaceful Apache at Galeana, Chihuahua. Kirker claimed that he had followed the trail of stolen livestock to the Apache encampment. However, the bankrupt Chihuahua government could not afford to continue paying Kirker and offered him instead a commission as Colonel in the Mexican Army. Kirker turned down the offer. In ill repute and with the Mexican–American War inflaming public opinion against Anglo-Americans, Kirker fled Mexico. He was declared an enemy of the state with a 10,000 peso price on his head.

== After Mexico ==
Kirker was employed by Col. Alexander William Doniphan's American army as a scout, and participated in the American invasion of northern Mexico during the Mexican–American War. In 1848, he served as a scout in an American expedition against the Apache and Ute. In 1849, he guided a wagon trail of "Forty-Niners" to California. He settled with his family in Contra Costa county in California. Kirker Creek and Kirker Pass are named after him, with controversy arising by 2022 about using his names after the slaughter he committed. He died in 1852.

It is difficult to untangle fact from folklore in the details of Kirker's life.
