= Charles McCorrie =

Recipient of the Victoria Cross

Charles McCorrie (McCurry)
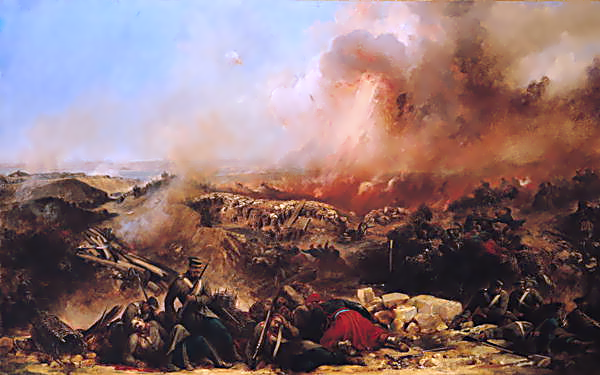
- Depiction of the Siege of Sebastopol
- Born: 1830; Killead, County Antrim
- Died: 8 April 1857 (aged 26-27); Malta
- Burial place: Msida Bastion Historic Garden, Floriana, Malta
- Military career
- Allegiance: United Kingdom
- Branch: British Army
- Rank: Private
- Units: 57th (West Middlesex) Regiment of Foot
- Conflicts: Crimean War
- Awards: Victoria Cross

Charles McCorrie (or McCurry) VC (1830 – 8 April 1857) was born in Killead, County Antrim and was an Irish recipient of the Victoria Cross, the highest and most prestigious award for gallantry in the face of the enemy that can be awarded to British and Commonwealth forces.

== Details ==
He was approx. 25 years old, and a private in the 57th Regiment (later Middlesex Regiment (Duke of Cambridge's Own)), British Army, during the Crimean War when the following deed took place for which he was awarded the VC.

On 23 June 1855 at Sebastopol, in the Crimea, Private McCorrie threw over the parapet a live shell which had been thrown from the enemy's battery.

He died in Malta on 8 April 1857.
