= Killead =

Hamlet in County Antrim, Northern Ireland

Coordinates: 54.6651°N 6.1805°W

Killead: Irish: Cill Éad
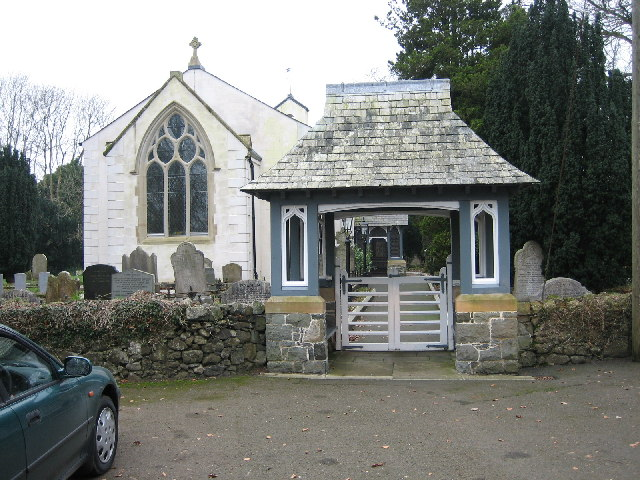
- St Catherine's Church of Ireland in the village

- Location within Northern Ireland
- Population: 81 (2011 Census)
- Irish grid reference: J173812
  - Belfast: 14 mi (23 km)
- District: Antrim and Newtownabbey
- County: County Antrim
- Country: Northern Ireland
- Sovereign state: United Kingdom
- Post town: CRUMLIN
- Postcode district: BT29
- Dialling code: 028
- UK Parliament: South Antrim
- NI Assembly: South Antrim

Killead (from Irish Cill Éad) is a hamlet and civil parish in County Antrim, Northern Ireland. It is near Aldergrove and Antrim and is accessed from the A26 Tully Road. It had a population of 81 people (32 households) in the 2011 Census. (2001 Census: 78 people)

== People ==
- James Molyneaux, Baron Molyneaux of Killead (27 August 1920 – 9 March 2015) was born in the village. He was a Northern Irish Unionist politician and was leader of the Ulster Unionist Party from 1979 to 1995.
- Reverend Arthur Bell Nicholls, who was the Reverend Patrick Brontë's curate, and husband of Charlotte Brontë, was born in Killead on 6 January 1819.
- James Gordon was born in the parish of Killead on 31 October 1739, attended local schools and emigrated to the United States in 1758, settling in Schenectady, New York. He served in Congress from 1791 to 1795 and in the State senate from 1797 to 1804.
- Rev James Alexander Hamilton Irwin (1876–1954) ministered at the Presbyterian Church at Killead from 1903 to 1926. He was a vocal supporter of Home Rule for Ireland and later became a supporter of Irish independence.
- Charles McCorrie VC 1830–1857 Was born in the Parish of Killead and was awarded the Victoria Cross during the Crimean War in 1853 for throwing a live Russian shell over the Parapet. He died in Malta on 9 April 1857.
- James Kirker, emigrated to USA where he was a pirate, grocer, fur-trapper and scalp hunter. Kirker's ruthlessness at hunting Apache's and bold actions led to him being informally dubbed 'The King of New Mexico.

== See also ==
- List of civil parishes of County Antrim
