= Socialist Party of Northern Ireland =

- Leader: Jack Macgougan (from 1935)
- Chairman: Fred McMahon; Sam Haslett
- Founded: 1932
- Dissolved: c.1940
- Preceded by: Independent Labour Party
- Headquarters: 48 York Street
- Ideology: Socialism
- Political position: Left-wing

The Socialist Party of Northern Ireland, sometimes known as the Northern Ireland Socialist Party, was a small socialist group based in Northern Ireland in the 1930s.

== Early years ==
The group originated in Belfast in 1892 as the Belfast Labour Party (BLP), founded by activists including William Walker and John Murphy. It became a branch of the British-based Independent Labour Party (ILP) when that organisation was founded in 1893. Later in the year, the British Trades Union Congress held its annual conference in Belfast, and an ILP fringe meeting was addressed by speakers including Keir Hardie, greatly increasing local party membership. The local group opposed Irish Home Rule, but were widely attacked by hardline unionists, and as a result largely ceased activities in 1896. However, Walker and Murphy continued to work together and hold membership of the ILP.

The ILP in Belfast was revived in 1906, when new branches were formed in North and Central Belfast, and it quickly grew to have five branches. Walker remained its leading figure, while William McMullen also became a prominent activist. James Connolly aimed to win these branches to his own Socialist Party of Ireland (SPI), and he called a unity conference in Dublin in 1912, attended by four of the Belfast ILP groups (the exception being Walker's North Belfast branch). The branches united with the SPI and the Belfast branch of the British Socialist Party to form the "Independent Labour Party of Ireland", although this collapsed soon after the outbreak of World War I, after Connolly was banned from giving speeches alleged to be pro-German in Belfast by the local leadership of the group. However, the Belfast groups were split in their attitudes to Home Rule, the North Belfast branch being the largest and most strongly loyalist, the Central branch being close to the British Labour Party, and the East Belfast branch remaining supportive of Connolly's republican nationalism.

== Northern Ireland Labour Party ==
The ILP worked closely with the BLP. When the BLP became the Northern Ireland Labour Party (NILP), most ILP members in the city joined, while retaining their ILP membership. This continued until 1932, when the ILP disaffiliated from the British Labour Party. The national leadership wished the Belfast branches to similarly disaffiliate from the NILP, but members rejected the idea, and instead split from the ILP to form the Socialist Party of Northern Ireland. This new body then affiliated to the NILP. The Socialist Party had around 150 members, and was chaired by Fred McMahon, and later by Sam Haslett. Other notable members included Jack Macgougan, secretary from 1935 onwards, and Victor Halley.

The ILP was based on the Crumlin Road, until its building was burnt down in the 1920s in a presumed sectarian attack. It received a large sum in compensation, and used part of this to open a new Labour Hall at 48 York Street, which also housed a social club for members.

The party was very active in supporting the Republicans during the Spanish Civil War, and McMahon went over to join a medical unit there, alongside Joe Boyd, another Socialist Party member. In 1937, the party backed the short-lived Irish Democrat newspaper, co-published with the Communist Party of Ireland and the Republican Congress. The party disappeared soon afterwards; many members, including Macgougan, devoted their time to the NILP, but Halley instead joined the Socialist Republican Party.
