= James Alexander Hamilton Irwin =

Scots-Irish Presbyterian minister (1876–1954)

James Alexander Hamilton Irwin (1876–1954) was an Irish Presbyterian minister and a supporter of Irish unity and independence.

== Life ==
Born in Feeny, County Londonderry, Ireland, Irwin was educated at the local national school in Rallagh, and then at Magee College. In 1900 he went to the University of Edinburgh studying arts, and pursuing his clerical studies in New College.

Irwin was ordained a Presbyterian minister in November 1903 in Killead Church, County Antrim, where he ministered until 1926. He was a Home Ruler who converted to the republican cause post-1916. He toured America with Éamon de Valera in the 1920s, who became a lifelong friend.

In October 1926 Irwin left Killead, and ministered in St Michael's Parish Church, Edinburgh. In 1928 he moved to St Thomas' Church, Leith, returning to Ireland in 1935. He lived and ministered in Lucan, County Dublin.

In 1937 Irwin was consulted by De Valera about the composition of the new Constitution of Ireland. Appointed to the Fianna Fáil-led government's Commission on Vocational Organisation from 1939–43 and later joined the party and served on the Fianna Fáil national executive from 1945 until his death in 1954. He was offered the opportunity by Fianna Fáil to stand for the Presidency of Ireland but declined to do so.

In 1948 Irwin, despite dissenting from its unionist-majority sentiment, represented the Presbyterian Church in Ireland at the World Council of Churches in Amsterdam and, until his death in 1954, on the British Council of Churches.

He died at The Manse, Lucan, 27 July 1954.
