= Victor Halley =

Irish trade unionist

Victor Halley (15 January 1904 – 24 October 1966) was an Irish trade unionist and socialist in Northern Ireland, who identified the cause of labour with the achievement of an all-Ireland republic.

A Presbyterian, Halley was born in 1904 at 19 Carew Street, Belfast, the son of James Halley, a soldier, and Julia McCormick. He became an official, and eventually Vice-Chairman, of the Amalgamated Transport and General Workers' Union.

Haley joined the Independent Labour Party, and when in 1932 this disaffiliated from the British Labour Party, he became a founder member of the Socialist Party of Northern Ireland, which retained its Northern Ireland Labour Party affiliation. A mainly Protestant organisation, it had around 150 members in the Shankill and Newtownards Road districts of Belfast, Included were Jack Macgougan, and the married couple, Ulster Volunteer veteran George McBride and his wife, 1916 Easter Rising veteran Winifred Carney.

In 1934, along with Macgougan, the original Irish Citizen Army organiser Jack White and other northern trade unionists and socialists, he attended the convention in Athlone that established the broad "anti-imperialist" Republican Congress, an initiative of a left split from the Irish Republican Army. From 1936 he was active, alongside Betty Sinclair, Macgougan, McBride, Carney and others, in organising relief aid for the Spanish Republic during the civil war with Franco.

In 1944, with other Protestant trade unionists in west Belfast, Halley joined Nationalist Party dissidents around Harry Diamond, and ex IRA volunteers in forming the Socialist Republican Party. He stood for the party at the 1946 Belfast Central by-election for the party, but was defeated by Frank Hanna of the NILP by 5,566 to 2,783 votes.

In 1948, along with MacGougan and the writer Denis Ireland, Haley was a member of the Belfast 1798 Commemoration Committee. After the government blocked a rally in the city centre, a crowd of 30,000 gathered in Corrigan Park in nationalist west Belfast where they heard Halley declare: "The people who destroyed Tone in Ireland were those who feared the Protestant tradition of association with America, French Republicanism, Freedom and Democracy".

In 1950 and 51, with Diamond he led efforts within the Irish Labour Party to persuade it to organise north of the border.

He died in 1966 in County Westmeath, Ireland.
