= John Graham (Irish republican) =

Irish republican (1915-1997)

- Born: 1915; Belfast, Ireland
- Died: 29 December 1997 (aged 81–82)

John S.S. Graham (1915 in Belfast, Ireland – 29 December 1997) was an important Irish Republican Army (IRA) activist in the 1940s.

== Life ==
He was a member of a Protestant group (including George Gilmore and George Plant) who joined the IRA, and for a time in the 1940s they formed a company of the IRA in Belfast. He rose to become Belfast Commander and Northern Director of Intelligence. Graham was arrested in September 1942 and sentenced to 12 years in prison. While in HM Prison Crumlin Road he (and 21 other Irish Republicans) went on a "strip strike" asking for treatment as political prisoners. The strip strike began in mid June 1943 and was called off in early September. The strike attracted little attention due to war time censorship.

Graham was jailed during the IRA "Border Campaign" of 1956-62. While in prison, he learned Irish, and started one of the first Irish language newspapers in Belfast (which is now discontinued). In the late 1970s, a book was written about him, in which the author used a code name, John Gray, instead of John Graham.

He was a communicant of the Church of Ireland and opposed any romanisation of that church. As a member of the select vestry of St Mary's on the Crumlin Road in Belfast, Graham resisted the placing of an image of the Virgin Mary in the church.
