= Women's Trade Union League (UK) =

Former trade union of the United Kingdom

The Women's Trade Union League, founded in 1874 and known until 1890 as the Women's Protective and Provident League, was a British organisation promoting trade union for women workers. It was established by Emma Paterson, who had seen unions managed by working women in America.

== History ==
The league's principal founder was Emma Paterson. A member of the Working Men's Club and Institute Union, she persuaded many of that organisation's patrons to serve in the same role for the new league. In 1872, she became secretary of the Society for the Promotion of Women's Suffrage Association, and although she was soon dismissed, these two roles gave her a keen interest in women's trade unionism. She visited the United States in 1873, and there studied the Women's Typographical Union and Female Umbrella Makers' Union. On her return to England, she wrote and article for Labour News, calling for an association of women trade unionists.

In July 1874, a conference was called to discuss Paterson's proposal. Chaired by Hodgson Pratt, it agreed to establish the "Women's Protective and Provident League", not as a trade union federation, but as an organisation which promoted women's trade unionism. Initially, it had four objects: protecting wages and conditions of workers, providing benefits for sick and unemployed workers, serving as an employment bureau, and promoting arbitration in the case of disputes between workers and employers. An executive committee was also elected. Paterson still wanted to form a trade union for women, and this occurred later in the year, when she set up the National Association of Working Women.

The WPPL facilitated the creation of several women's unions, including the Society of Women Employed in Bookbinding, the Society of London Sewing Machinists, the Society of Upholsteresses, the Dewsbury, Batley and Surrounding District Heavy Woollen Weavers' Association, Leeds Spinners' Women's Association and the Benefit Society for Glasgow Working Women. The Dewsbury, Batley and Surrounding District Heavy Woollen Weavers' Association was led by Ann Ellis and when the league offered help for their weaver's strike in 1875, Ellis decided that they would be self-reliant. Many soon collapsed, but the bookbinders thrived, and the upholsteresses survived, bringing Jeannette Wilkinson into the organisation. The league also established the Women's Halfpenny Bank in 1879, providing loans to members, in addition to a reading room, library and employment register, a swimming club and trips to Epping Forest.

In 1875, Paterson and Edith Simcox became the first women delegates to the Trades Union Congress. At this and subsequent conferences, WPPL representatives promoted women's rights, arguing against barriers to women's employment. Elsewhere, the league opposed Thomas Burt and Henry Broadhurst's efforts to stop women from working at coal mines, aligning with the Personal Rights Association and the Liberty and Property Defence League in order to do so. From 1876, the union published a monthly journal, the Women's Union Journal. However, this consumed nearly half its funds, and it struggled to survive. In 1879, it faced a £90 debt, but most was covered by a collection organised by Stopford Brooke from his congregation.

Paterson died in 1886, and the league was thereafter led by Emilia Dilke, who also contributed about £100 a year from her personal funds. The league came to focus on promoting legislation to improve the rights of working women, and on persuading all-male trade unions to begin admitting women. In 1895, member Amy Hurlston gave evidence to the Royal Commission on the Aged Poor.

Mona Wilson became general secretary in 1899, and was succeeded in 1903 by Mary Macarthur. Macarthur's leadership rejuvenated the league, and by 1905 its membership had risen to 70,000, including 16,000 men. Macarthur founded the Union of Jute, Flax and Kindred Textile Operatives in 1906, to improve the position of women workers in the city, and the difficulties of supporting the union led her to found the National Federation of Women Workers (NFWW), with a constitution stating that three members of the league would serve on the federation's executive. The federation took on much of the direct organising work previously covered by the league.

The league took an interest in working conditions for children. It formed a committee to look at the role of wage earning children and to advise on reform. Members included feminist Jane Brownlow, socialist Margaret Macdonald and Ruth Homan.

In 1915, the league launched a campaign to get women undertaking war work, particularly in munitions factories, to join trade unions. The following year, it worked with the NFWW, Women's Co-operative Guild, Women's Labour League and the Railway Women's Guild to establish the Standing Joint Committee of Industrial Women's Organisations, to advocate for the representation of working women on government bodies.

Macarthur attended the Women's International Labour Conference in 1919, and also the founding conference of the International Labour Organization, as an adviser to G. H. Stuart-Bunning. These conferences inspired her to merge the women's trade union organisations into their counterparts, and this was achieved in 1921, when the Women's Trade Union League became the Women's Section of the Trades Union Congress (TUC), with two women's places on General Council of the TUC.

== General Secretaries ==
1874: Emma Paterson
1886: Clementina Black
1888:
1892: Gertrude Tuckwell
1899: Mona Wilson
1903: Mary Macarthur

== Presidents ==
1886: Emilia Dilke
1904: Gertrude Tuckwell

== See also ==
- Trade unions in the United Kingdom
