= Mary Macarthur =

British labour organizer, editor (1880–1921)

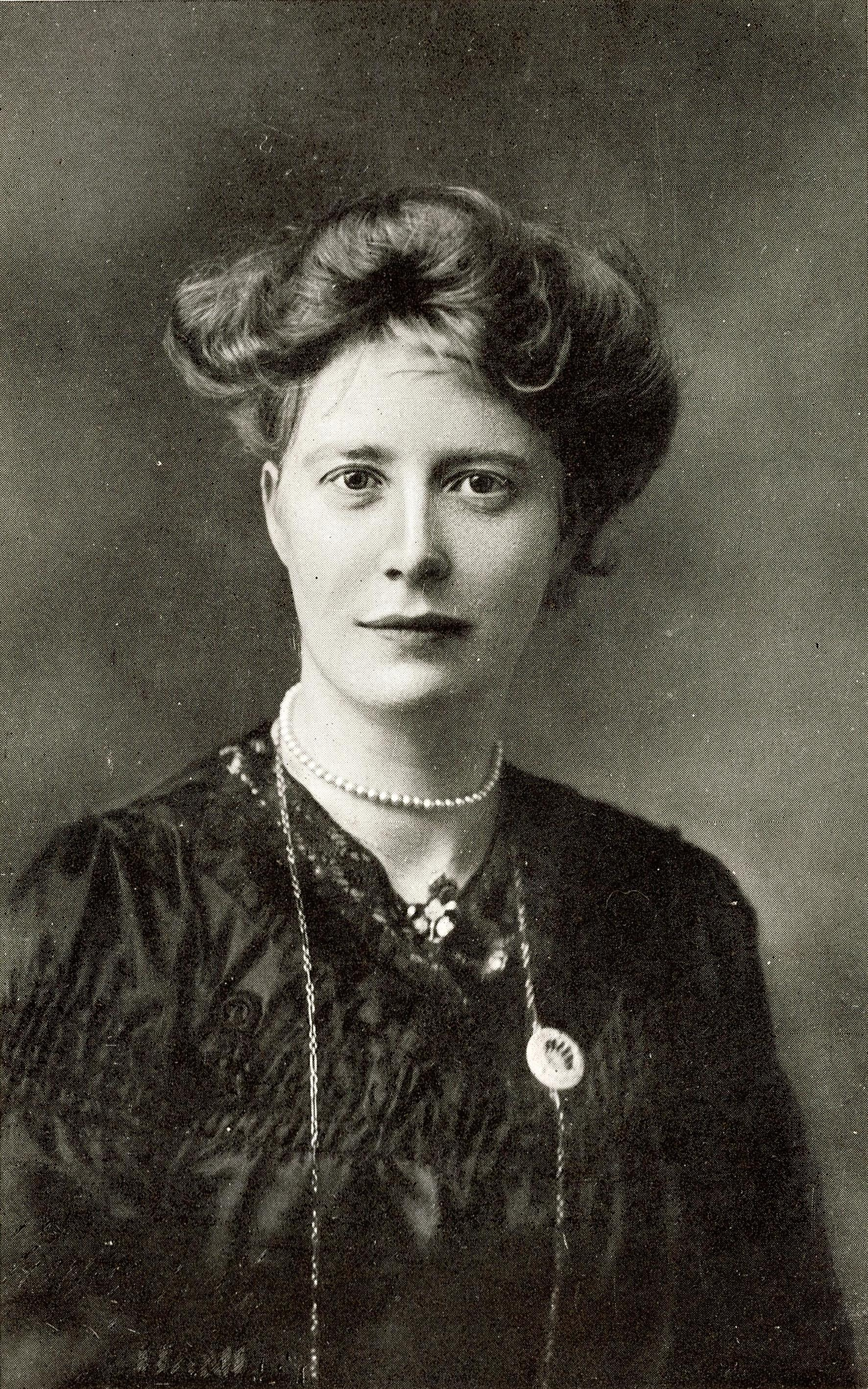
- Born: Mary Reid Macarthur; 13 August 1880; Glasgow, Scotland
- Died: 1 January 1921 (aged 40); Golders Green, London, England
- Known for: Women's trade unionism and women's suffrage
- Spouse: William Anderson

Mary Reid Anderson (née Macarthur; 13 August 1880 – 1 January 1921) was a Scottish suffragist (although at odds with the national groups who were willing to let a minority of women gain the franchise) and was a leading trade unionist. She was the general secretary of the Women's Trade Union League and was involved in the formation of the National Federation of Women Workers and National Anti-Sweating League.

In 1910, Macarthur led the women chain makers of Cradley Heath to victory in their fight for a minimum wage and led a strike to force employers to implement the rise.

Around 1901, Macarthur became a trade unionist after hearing a speech made by John Turner about how badly some workers were being treated by their employers. She became secretary of the Ayr branch of the Shop Assistants' Union, and her interest in this union led to her work for the improvement of women's labour conditions. In 1902 Mary became friends with Margaret Bondfield who encouraged her to attend the union's national conference where Macarthur became the first woman to be elected to the union's national executive.

== Family life ==
Macarthur was born on 13 August 1880 in Glasgow, the eldest of six children of John Duncan Macarthur, the owner of a drapery business, and his wife, Anne Elizabeth Martin. She attended Glasgow Girls' High School, and, after editing the school magazine, decided she wanted to become a full-time writer. After her Glasgow schooling she spent time studying in Germany before returning to Scotland to work for her father as a bookkeeper.

After becoming politically active, Mary met and eventually married William Crawford Anderson, the chairman of the executive committee of the Independent Labour Party, in 1911, ten years after he first proposed. Their first child died at birth in 1913. Their daughter Anne Elizabeth was born in 1915.

== Trade union activism and support for universal suffrage ==
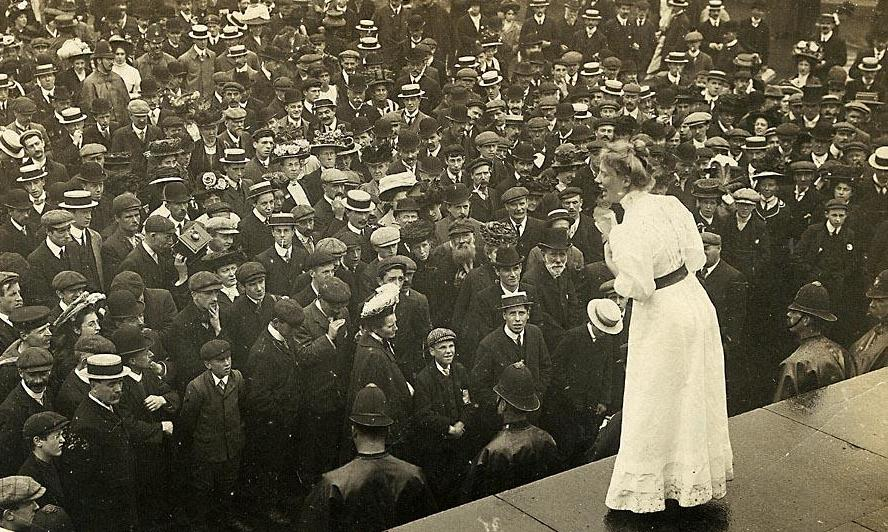
Macarthur addresses a mass meeting in Trafalgar Square, London, during the Corruganza box makers strike, 1908

In 1903 Macarthur moved to London where she became Secretary of the Women's Trade Union League. Active in the fight for the vote, she was totally opposed to those in the NUWSS and the WSPU who were willing to accept the franchise being given to only certain groups of women. Macarthur believed that a limited franchise would disadvantage the working class and feared that it might act against the granting of full adult suffrage, and this view did not make her welcome in the more high profile suffrage movements. Macarthur's view was criticised by the middle-class leaders of the Votes for Woman movement who thought that a partial enfranchisement was more likely to succeed and that would make it easier to achieve a full suffrage.

The Women's Trade Union League united women-only unions from different trades including a mixed-class membership. The conflicting aims of activists affiliated with different classes and organisations barred the league from affiliation to the Trades Union Congress.

To solve this conflict Macarthur founded the National Federation of Women Workers in 1906. The model for the Federation was a general labour union, "open to all women in unorganised trades or who were not admitted to their appropriate trade union." This federation pre-dated the National Union of General Workers (formed in 1921) and led by and for women.

In general Macarthur chose the universal suffrage position over gradualist approaches both within the Trade Union movement and the Women's Rights movement. "Mary Macarthur estimated that if women were enfranchised on the same terms as men, less than 5 per cent of working women would be eligible." (Tony Cliff quoting the Proceedings, National Women's Trade Union League, USA (1919), p. 29.)

Macarthur was involved in the Exhibition of Sweated Industries in 1905 and the formation of Britain's Anti-Sweating League in 1906. The following year she founded the Women Worker, a monthly newspaper for women trade unionists. Then in 1908, after six weeks in hospital with diphtheria, she presented findings of her research (in poorer areas of the capital), with sweated homeworking women, to the House of Commons Select Committee on Home Working.

A form of minimum wage law, the Trade Board Act 1909 was eventually passed from the activism and the evidence Macarthur and others had gathered and the changes that she had lobbied for. In 1909 The New York Times published an article about Macarthur which bears witness to some of the divisions in the Women's movement at the time and across the Atlantic.

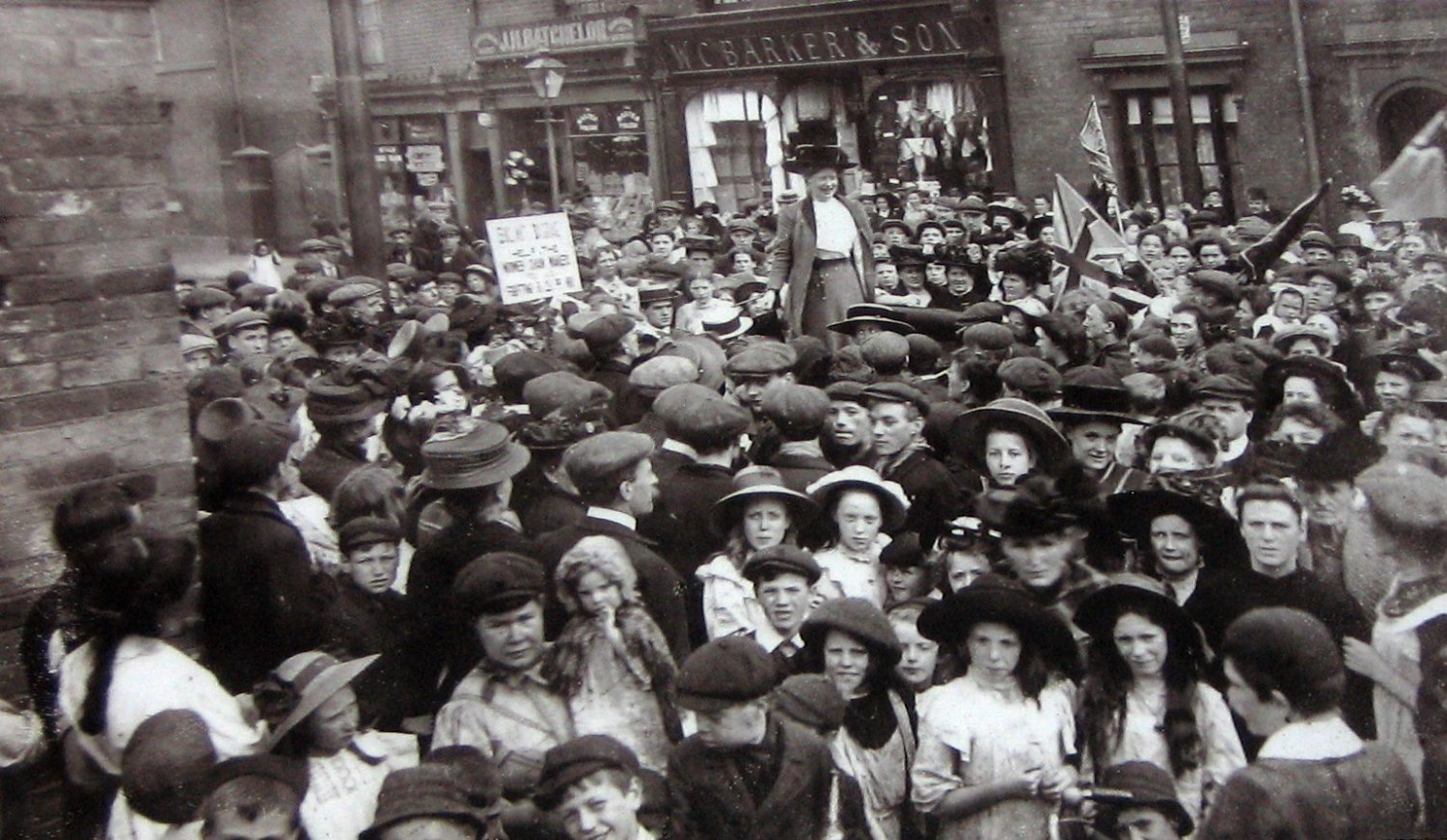
Macarthur addressing the crowds during the chainmakers' strike, Cradley Heath 1910

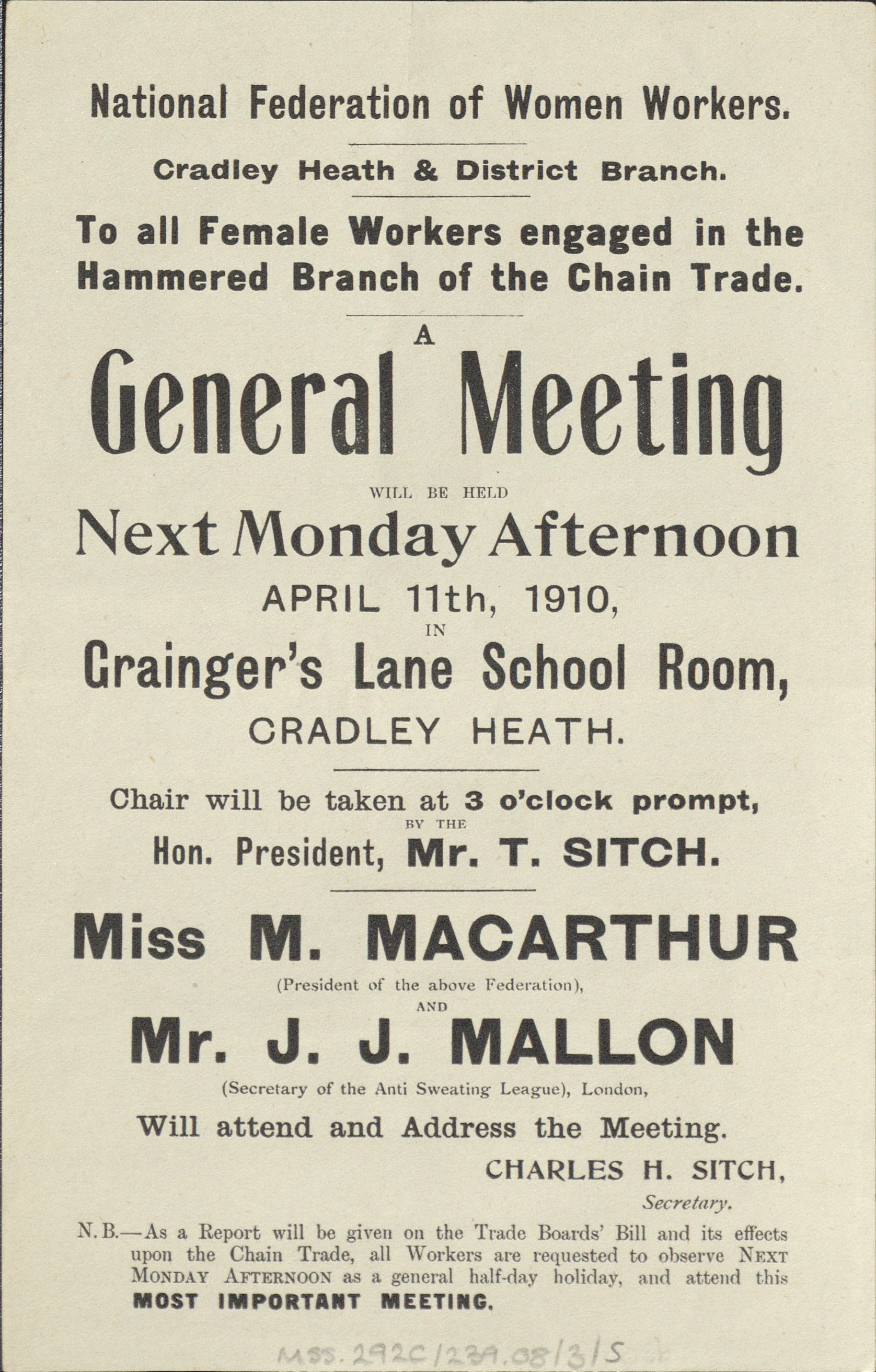
Handbill for an 11 April 1910 National Federation of Women Workers meeting to discuss the chainmakers' strike, with Macarthur's name, as president of the federation, prominent

In 1910 the women chainmakers of Cradley Heath won a battle to establish the right to a fair wage following a 10-week strike. This landmark victory changed the lives of thousands of workers who were earning little more than 'starvation wages'. Macarthur was the trade unionist who led the women chain makers in their fight for better pay. In reference to female earnings, Macarthur commented that "women are unorganised because they are badly paid, and poorly paid because they are unorganised.". The dispute ended on the 22 October 1910 when the last of the employers agreed to pay the minimum wage. The Cradley Heath Workers' Institute was funded using money left over from the strike fund of the 1910.

Because of the fame she had earned as an organiser at Cradley Heath Macarthur was immediately sent for in August, 1911, when the Bermondsey Uprising began. Early in 1911 Ada Salter had founded a Women's Labour League (WLL) branch in Bermondsey and was recruiting women in the local food and drink factories to Macarthur's NFWW. In August, one of the hottest on record, the appalling conditions in some of these factories became unbearable and 14,000 women suddenly walked out on strike from 22 factories. This was the Bermondsey Uprising. Though inspired by Salter, it was Macarthur who organised the strikers, led the negotiations and secured a historic victory for low-paid women.

The highlight was a mass rally in Southwark Park where the blistering oratory of Macarthur was backed up by suffragists Sylvia Pankhurst, Charlotte Despard and George Lansbury. In 1911, Macarthur also married William Crawford Anderson, chairman of the executive committee of the Labour party, who was from 1914 to 1918 member for the Attercliffe division of Sheffield.

== Cat and Mouse Act and war effort ==
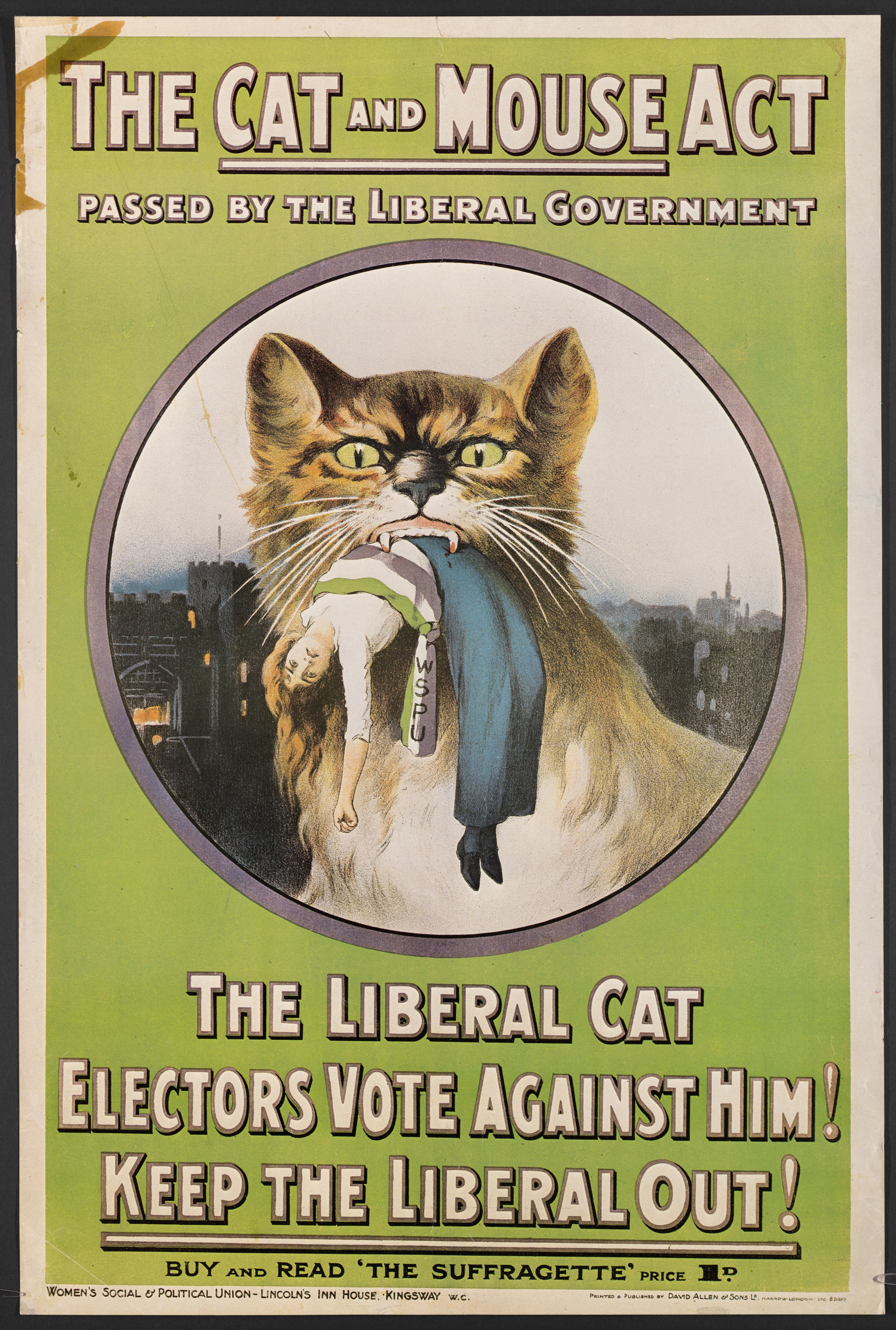
Poster against the Cat and Mouse Act

In August 1913, in response to the government Prisoners (Temporary Discharge for Ill Health) Act 1913 whereby hunger striking suffragette prisoners would be released when too weak to be active and permitting their re-arrest as soon as they were active, Macarthur took part in a delegation to meet with the Home Secretary, Reginald McKenna and discuss the Cat and Mouse Act.

McKenna was unwilling to talk to them and when the women refused to leave the House of Commons, Macarthur and Margaret McMillan were physically ejected but Evelyn Sharp and Emmeline Pethick-Lawrence were arrested and sent to Holloway Prison.

Macarthur was a 'firm believer in universal rather than purely women's suffrage, and she had been careful not to allow the fight for the vote to become confused with her campaigns for better pay and conditions. She was well aware that success depended to a great extent on the support of the male trade unionist and politicians. When, at the end of the war, women aged 30 and over were given the vote, and were allowed for the first time to stand for Parliament, Mary saw her next challenge'.

Although an opponent of the war, Macarthur nonetheless became secretary of the Ministry of Labour's central committee on women's employment.

== The Stourbridge Parliamentary Election 1918 ==
After the Representation of the People Act 1918 had enfranchised women over the age of thirty and the Parliament (Qualification of Women) Act 1918 allowed women to stand for Parliament, Macarthur stood as Labour Party candidate in the newly created county constituency Stourbridge, Worcestershire at the General Election on 14 December 1919. This was a large constituency which included Halesowen, Oldbury, Cradley and Warley Woods. It did not include the Cradley Heath area where she had led the chain makers' dispute.

The returning officer insisted that she was listed under her married name of Mrs W.C. Anderson. The defending Liberal MP was John Wilson a director of the Albright and Wilson chemicals firm in Oldbury, which was in the constituency. She was also opposed by Victor Fisher of the National Democratic and Labour Party, who had the support of the Coalition, secret funding from the Unionists, and ran a particularly abusive campaign. During the campaign she worked closely with John Davison, the Labour candidate in neighbouring Smethwick to defeat Christabel Pankhurst who was running as the Coalition candidate with Unionist support. Macarthur was defeated, as were most anti-war candidates, including her husband, William Anderson, who was defending Sheffield, Attercliffe.

== Later years and death ==
Mary Macarthur continued her involvement with the Women's Trade Union League and was instrumental in its eventual integration as the Women's Section of the Trades Union Congress, helping to amplify the voice of working women within the broader labor movement.

In 1918 she employed Dorothy Elliott to be employed by the National Federation of Women Workers. Macarthur was the General Secretary and Elliott was employed to recruit workers into the union. She was paid less than she had earned as a munitions worker during the war and she was expected to work every day of the week on a 14 hour day.

William Anderson died during the 1919 influenza epidemic.

Mary Macarthur Anderson died of cancer on 1 January 1921, at the age of 40, in Golders Green, London.

== Legacy ==
An exhibition commemorating Macarthur is displayed in the Cradley Heath Workers' Institute, which has been rebuilt at the Black Country Living Museum.

The Mary Macarthur Scholarship Fund and Mary Macarthur Educational Trust were established in 1922 and 1968 respectively, with the aims "to advance the educational opportunities of working women". Awards are made in memory of "pioneers of trade unionism", Mary Macarthur, Emma Paterson, Lady Dilke and Jessie Stephen. Their assets were transferred to the TUC Educational Trusts in 2010.

The Mary Macarthur Holiday Trust, based in Cardiff, helps fund holidays for vulnerable and needy women.

A statue was unveiled of Mary Macarthur in Mary Macarthur Gardens in Cradley Heath, West Midlands in 2012. She is also remembered in the name of Mary Macarthur Drive, Cradley Heath.

On the eve of International Women's Day 2017, a blue plaque was unveiled at her home at 42 Woodstock Road in Golders Green, where she lived while she was at her most prominent.

Her name and picture (and those of 58 other women's suffrage supporters) are on the plinth of the statue of Millicent Fawcett in Parliament Square, London, unveiled in 2018.

There is social housing in London named after Mary Macarthur at Field Road, Hammersmith; Walter Street, Bethnal Green; and Wythenshawe Road, Dagenham.

== In popular culture ==
Mary Macarthur was featured in the Townsend Theatre Productions touring folk ballad Rouse Ye Women during April 2019. This included a performance at Cradley Heath Library. Bryony Purdue played the role of Macarthur supported by Neil Gore and Rowan Godel.

There is an annual festival organised by local trade unionists each July in Cradley Heath to commemorate the 1910 chain makers' strike.

== Gallery ==
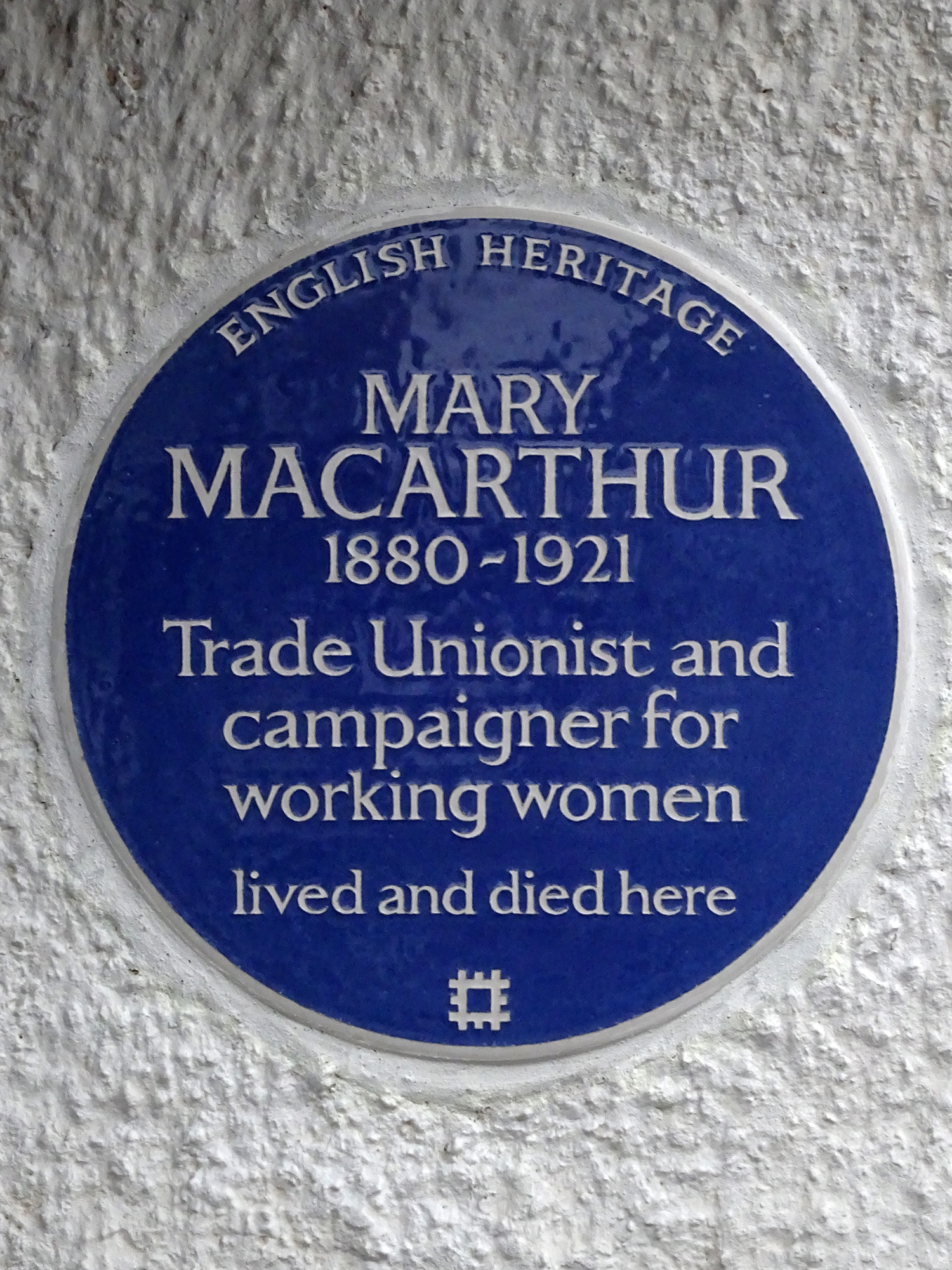
Blue plaque erected at 42 Woodstock Road, Golders Green, March 7th 2017

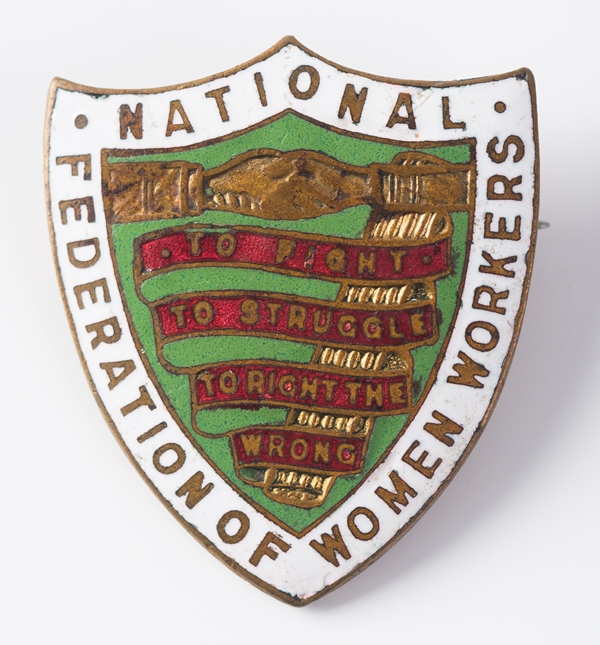
Badge of the National Federation of Women Workers - "To fight, to struggle, to right the wrong"

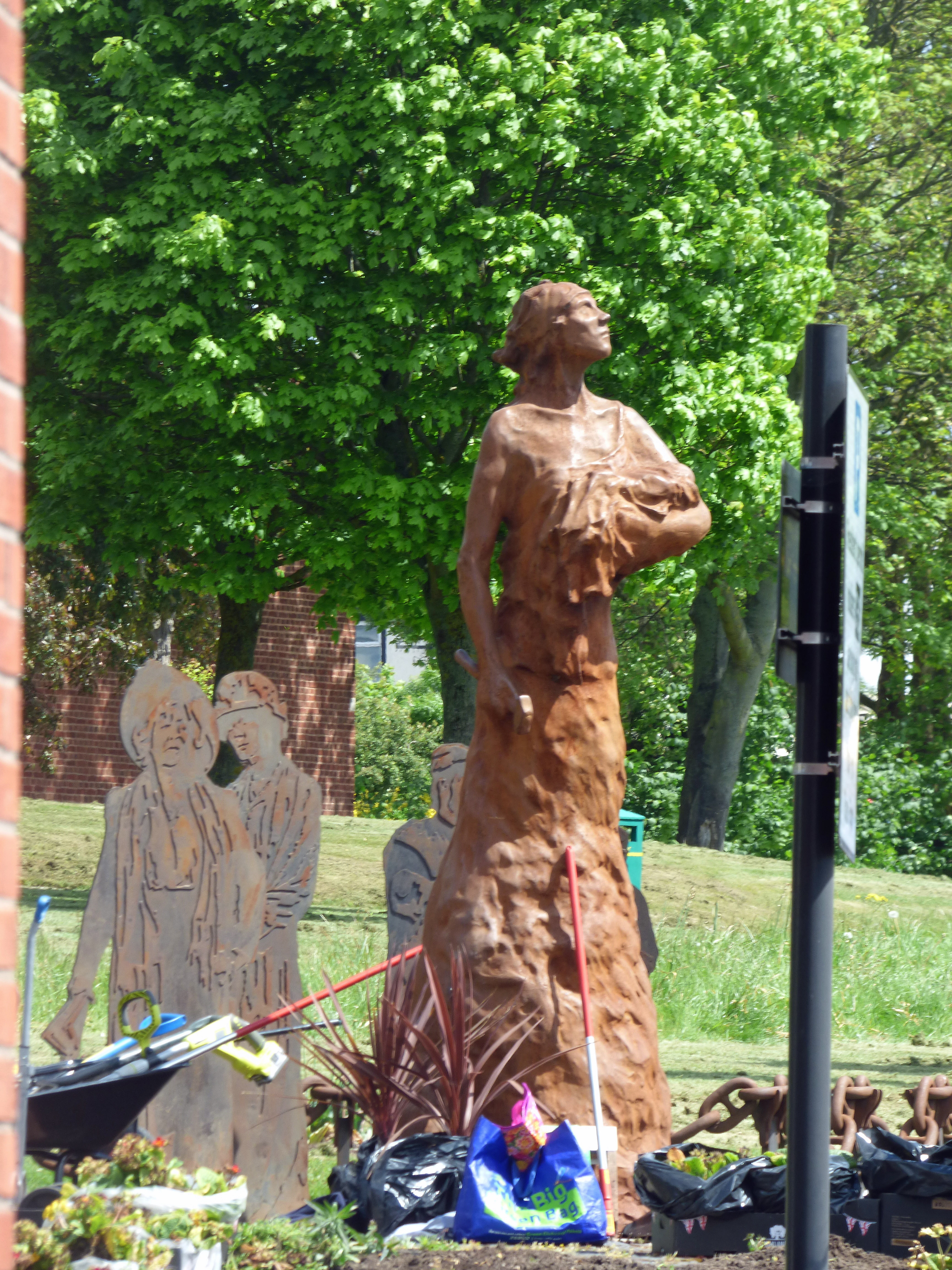
Statue of Mary Macarthur, Mary Macarthur Gardens, Cradley Heath

== See also ==
- History of feminism
- List of suffragists and suffragettes
- Women's Social and Political Union
- Women's suffrage
- Women's suffrage in the United Kingdom

== Publications ==
- Mary Macarthur 1880-1921 The Working Woman’s Champion RIGHTING THE WRONG By Cathy Hunt (2019)
- Hallam, David J.A. Taking on the Men: the first women parliamentary candidates 1918, (Studley 2018). This includes a chapter on her election campaign in 1918.
- Graham Taylor, Ada Salter: Pioneer of Ethical Socialism (2016)
- S. Boston, Women Workers and the Trade Unions (1980)
- Margaret Bondfield, A Life's Work (1948)
- M.A. Hamilton, Mary Macarthur (1925)

Trade union offices
New post	President of the National Federation of Women Workers; 1906 – 1911	Succeeded by Gertrude Tuckwell
Preceded by Helena Flowers	General Secretary of the National Federation of Women Workers; 1911 – 1921	Position abolished
