= National Federation of Women Workers =

Early 20th-century British trade union for women

NFWW
- National Federation of Women Workers
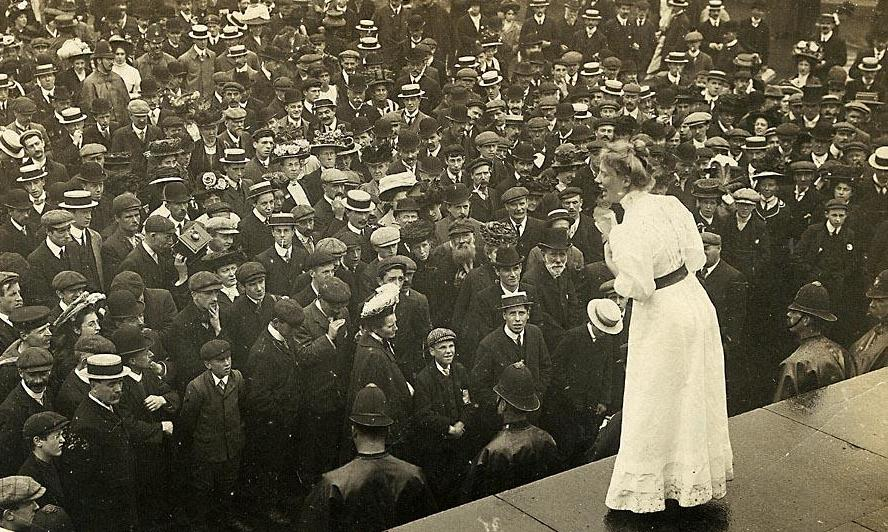
- Mary Macarthur addresses a mass meeting in London during the 1908 Corruganza strike
- Merged into: NUGW
- Founded: 1906
- Dissolved: 1921
- Location: United Kingdom of Great Britain and Ireland
- Members: 40,000 (1914)
- Key people: Mary Macarthur, General Secretary (1911–1921); Gertrude Tuckwell, President (1911–18)
- Affiliations: TUC, GFTU

The National Federation of Women Workers (NFWW) was a trade union in the United Kingdom of Great Britain and Ireland active in the first part of the 20th century. Instrumental in winning women workers the right to a minimum wage for the first time, the NFWW broke down barriers for women's membership in trade unions in general.

In contrast to the numerous small craft unions which organised women workers in the late 19th century, the NFWW was established in 1906 as a general trade union open to all women across a range of industries where women's work predominated, where wages were low and where trade unionism had to that time been unsuccessful. The Scottish suffragist Mary Macarthur played a key role throughout the NFWW's existence, leading campaigns against sweated industries, mobilising public support for striking members, lobbying for legislative reform and engaging with the broader labour movement.

In 1921 the NFWW amalgamated into the National Union of General Workers as that organisation's women worker's section.

== Beginnings ==
The NFWW was established out of frustration that existing trade unions were not open to female members. When first established, the NFWW was met with resistance from others within the trade union movement. The male-dominated unions regularly opposed the idea of "organised women" who would damage the status of trade unionism by the nature of having women who could not vote be part of the political movement.

The earlier established Women's Trade Union League (WTUL) promoted union membership to women, however the WTUL was not itself a trade union and acted instead as an umbrella group for women who were members of other existing unions. The unsuccessful dispute in 1906 of women workers in the Dundee Jute industry highlighted the need for a coordinated union. The Dundee dispute failed due to the inability of the WTUL to raise £100 required for a strike fund to support the strikers.

Those involved in the federation supported opening existing unions, however, at the time the Trades Union Congress did not allow mixed-sex unions affiliation and therefore an all-female union was needed. The NFWW is recognised as having a major influence in influencing the Liberal Party to introduce the Trade Boards Act 1909 which set minimum wages for industries that had a high proportion of female workers.

== Growth of the NFWW ==
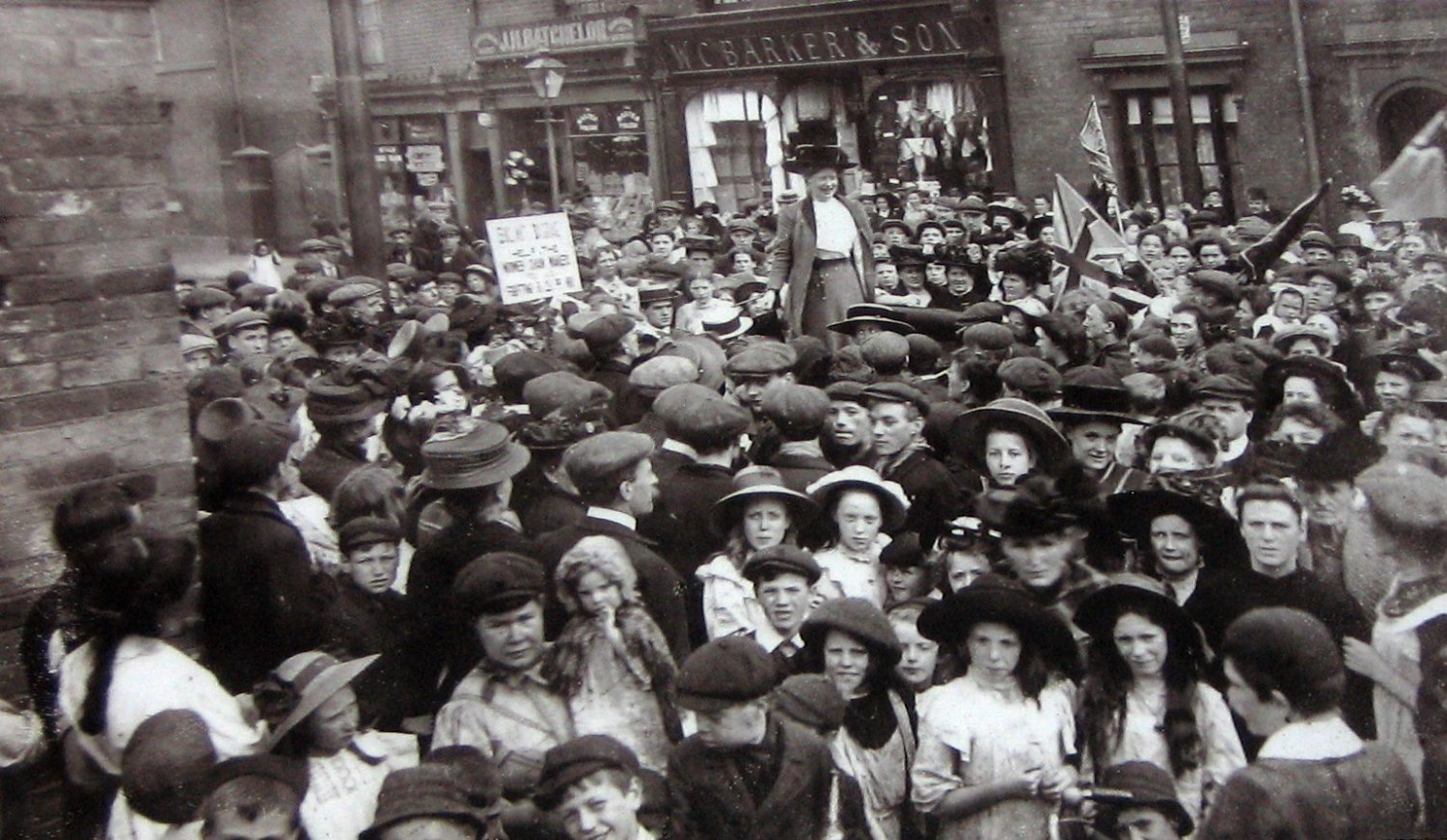
Mary Macarthur addressing the crowds during the chain makers' strike, Cradley Heath 1910

By the end of 1906 the NFWW had seventeen branches and 2,000 members, this grew to an estimated peak of around 40,000 in 1914.

The union's first successful action came in 1908, when it supported striking workers at the Corruganza box factory in Summerstown, London. This strike was organised in response to wage cuts at the factory. After organising the workers, the local NFWW organiser, Sophy Sanger, negotiated a settlement which saw wages brought back to the previous levels for most of the jobs at the factory.

In 1910 the NFWW organised a strike of around 800 women working as chain makers in Cradley Heath after they were denied the minimum 11s (55p) weekly wage as set in the Trade Boards Act. Chainmaking was the first industry to have minimum wages set under the act, however for six months workers were allowed to contract out of the new rates, allowing unscrupulous employers to demand or trick workers into agreeing to low rates of pay. This led to concern from the NFWW that employers were planning on stockpiling large quantities of chain made within the six-month window and later dismiss the workers once the minimum wage level was set. Mary Macarthur was also concerned that the result of this action would lead to the impression that having set minimum wages would lead to unemployment increases.

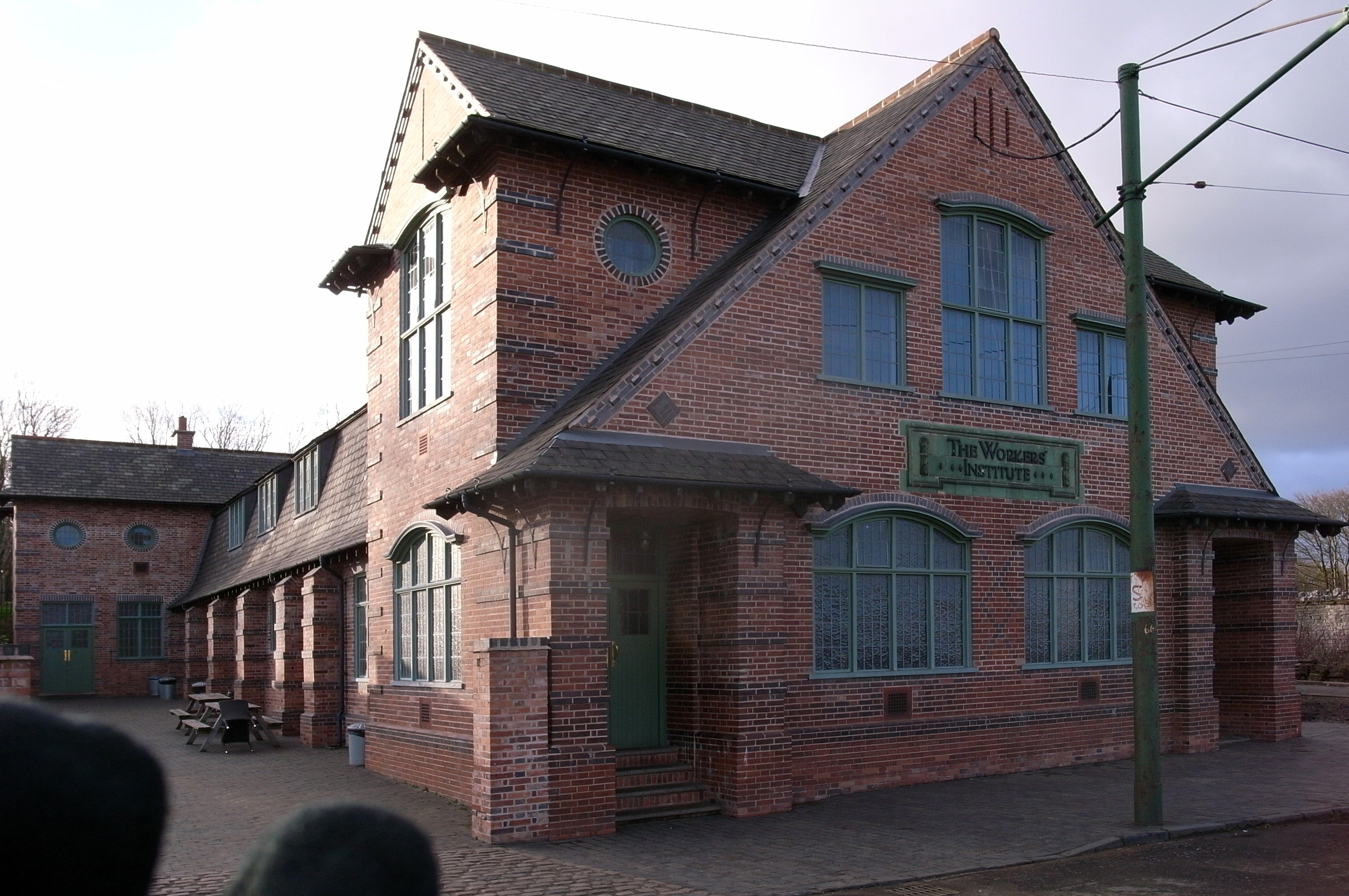
The Worker's Institute building, funded from leftover donations to the chain makers' strike fund

The NFWW worked with employers who were willing from the start to pay the minimum wage by ensuring them that their undercutting competitors would not get an advantage. The only way this could be achieved was to ensure workers for the company's refusing to pay the minimum wage went on strike in August 1910.

A strike fund raised by the union raised around £4,000 (approx. £450,000 in 2018 value) to support the strikers. Part of the success of the chainmakers' strike fundraising was due to the ability of the NFWW and Mary Macarthur to attract wide support amongst newspapers. Collections were made in local communities across the United Kingdom and Ireland from outside churches, football grounds, factories and Labour Party meetings. A Pathé news film of the chainmakers strike was produced around this time and was shown in picture theatres across the country which also helped the union come to the attention of the wider public.

Within a month 60% of the employers had agreed to pay the minimum wage requirement and after 10 weeks the final employer agreed on 22 October 1910. After the strike found success to raise wages, the remainder of the fund built the Cradley Heath Workers' Institute.

The 1913 networkers' strike in Kilbirnie in Ayrshire was agreed at an National Federation of Women Workers meeting in late March. It lasted from April to September 1913 and it was the longest recorded strike of women workers at that time. The strike was led by NFWW activist Kate McLean and it enjoyed broad community support. For example, in May 1913 there was a meeting in Kilbirnie where 10,000 supporters were present. The networkers dispute was resolved on 2 September 1913 with improved wages and working conditions created by the NFWW.

== World War 1 ==
During the First World War many women were drafted in to fill posts left vacant by men enlisted to armed forces. Between 1914 and 1918 an additional one million women would take up employment. Many of them however found poor conditions, low pay and long hours resulting in a number of industrial actions and disputes with employers supported by trade unions including the NFWW. During the war period trade union membership amongst women increased by 160%. The 1914 annual report from the union noted membership of 10,000 with seventy-six branches across Scotland and England. Action by the NFWW was successful during the war period as both employers and the government were sensitive to action because of labour shortages due to the conflict.

The first notable action of the NFWW during the First World War was at Ainsworth Mill in Cleator Moor in 1915. This mill created khaki thread for the uniforms of soldiers of the First World War. The workers were paid substantially low wages of between seven and nine shillings for a working week of 60 hours. The local Labour Party MP William Anderson, husband of NFWW leader Mary Mcarthur, called for an investigation into the low rates of pay in the House of Commons. A strike of 250 women and 20 boys followed the demands of an investigation which resulted in a 10% War bonus being paid to employees, alongside official recognition for the NFWW, after six weeks of dispute. In the same year the NFWW branch associated with the Hayes munitions factories had a membership of over half the women employed by the firm in 1915. A delegation from the union demanded equal pay for the women employed by the firm to end the inequality of wages between female and male workers. Men were paid seven pence an hour while female workers only received three and a half pence.

Following on from these successes in 1916 the NFWW assisted local worker to stage a sit-in protest at a munitions factory in Newcastle over the failure of a local company to pay out on a tribunal award to increase wages for local women workers. During the sit-in the workers knitted socks for soldiers on the front line of the First World War and refused to operate the factory machinery. This resulted in a furious phone call by the then Minister for Munitions Winston Churchill to Mary Macarthur demanding to know why she allowed the workers to stop. Macarthur told Churchill that the women would not go back to work until the tribunal findings had been paid. After 24 hours, the firm relented and back paid the missing wages. A later strike of 1920, again over low wages was organised at Ainsworth Mill. Later in 1916 over 2,500 young women went on strike in April 1916 at Greenwood and Batley's Leed's factory supported by the NFWW. Their dispute was around the gross differences in pay between the highest and lowest paid members of staff. The firm claimed the action was "unorganised and irresponsible".

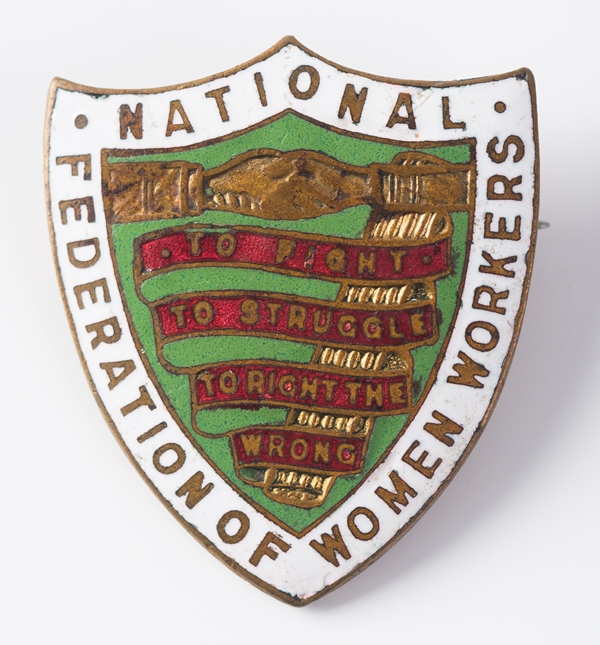
The badge of the NFWW. Joint hands are a common symbol in the trade union movement, in this case the two sleeves of the arms are slightly different to represent male and female joint action.

Industrial action became more common in the UK as the war progressed as real wages shrank as a result of inflation and the output expectations to contribute to the war effort resulted in longer working hours. For the NFWW a dispute was established in 1917 after a total of 21 female workers were dismissed from Darlington railway point manufacturer Thomas Summerson and Sons. These workers two of the workers attended an arbitration tribunal between the company and female workers. The NFWW brought a victimisation case against the firm offered to substitute those dismissed with new women but the NFWW demanded that all 21 workers be reinstated.

Not only did the actions during the First World War cement the NFWW as a trade union with the ability to successfully carry out industrial disputes, but it also came at a time when there was wider political discussions on the rights of women including the suffrage movement.

== Later action and merger with NUGW ==
The NFWW were involved in the 1918 tram and bus strikes that affected transport in the West London area. By the end of the War the London General Omnibus Company employed 3,500 women with many other firms having large proportions of female workers as well. They demanded "equal pay for equal labour" for female workers.

The NFWW took part in the 1919 International Congress of Working Women where Mary Macarthur represented the union as one of two representatives from the United Kingdom, the other being Margaret Bondfield who represented the Trades Union Congress.

In 1920 the NFWW merged with the National Union of General Workers initially as a district of the larger NUGW to represent women workers. It was believed at the time of the mergers that being part of a larger union would be an advantage but that a distinct identity for women within the NGWU could be maintained. As a 'district' it ensured that women had direct representation however by 1930 this unique status had been lost and therefore the direct representation of women in the leadership of the NUGW and as delegates to the Trades Union Congress was lost.

== The Woman Worker newspaper ==
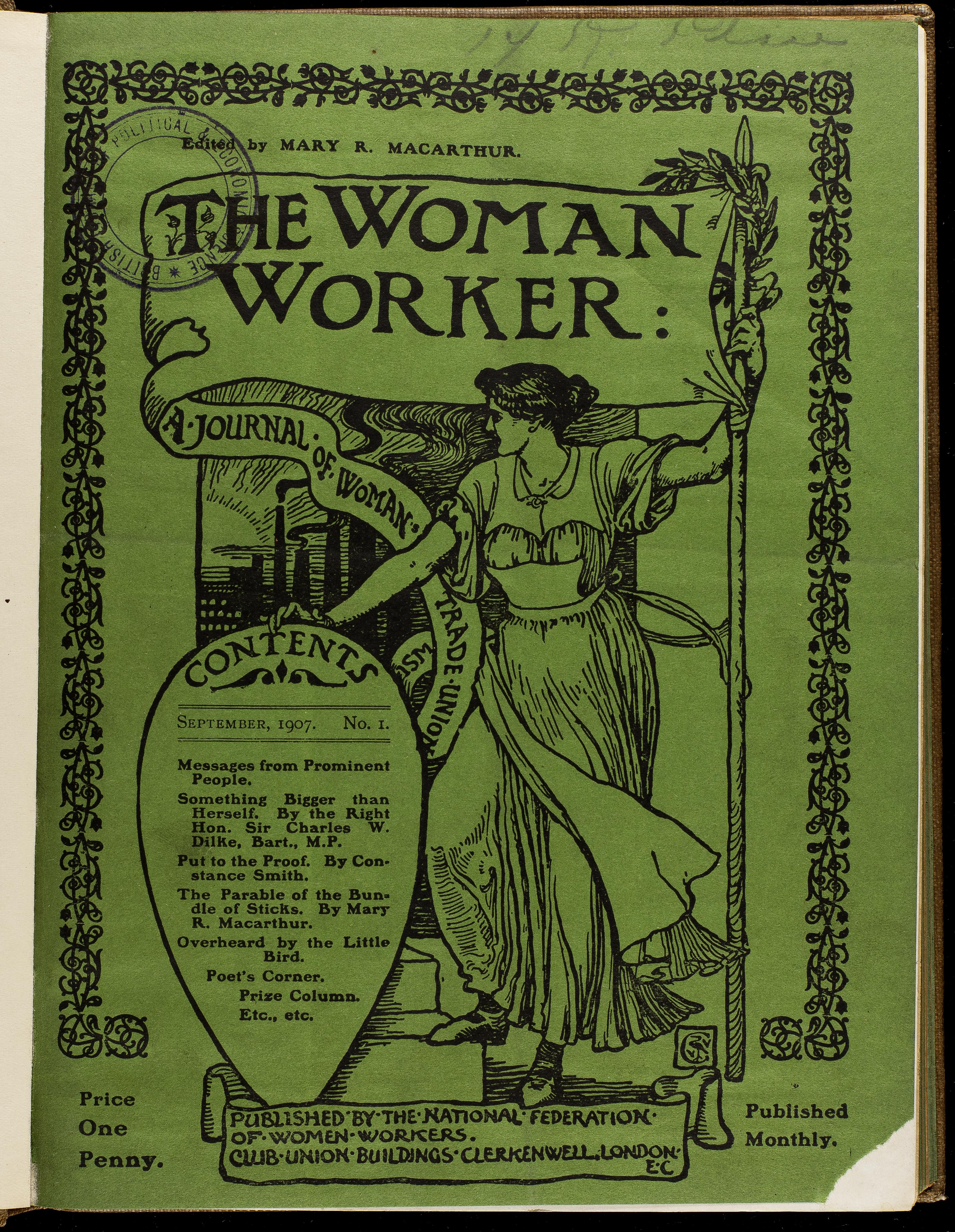
An issue of The Women Worker from 1907

The high profile of the NFWW was due in part to its newspaper The Woman Worker, published from 1907 to 1910, which collated allegories, anecdotes and related advertisements associated with its members. Initially edited by the president of the NFWW Mary Macarthur and published monthly, it was the only publication of its time aimed at working women as its primary audience and covered a broad range of subjects from fashion and literature to suffrage, feminism and socialist politics. In the first edition of the paper Macarthur stated in the editorial the purpose of the paper was to "To teach the need for unity, to help improve working conditions, to present a monthly picture of the many activities of women Trade Unionists, to discuss all questions affecting the interests and welfare of women. Such, in brief, is our aim and purpose." While much of the content was focused on unionism and women's rights the paper also contained lighter content such as features entitled "The Art of Beauty" and "Home Hints".

In 1908, with the involvement of Robert Blatchford, socialist campaigner and founder of The Clarion socialist newspaper, it began to be published weekly and to move beyond the affairs of NFWW to attract a broader readership. At its peak it attained a circulation of around 20,000. Macarthur ceased to be editor in December 1908 complaining of "the chains of office [that] riveted me oft-times to my desk when I would fain have been a-fighting in the open field".

During this time, The Woman Worker shared contributors and editors with Blatchford's the Clarion but was discontinued in 1910 due to low circulation. In an attempt to boost circulation it was rebranded as Women Folk in February 1910 with Robert's daughter, Winifred Blatchford as editor before ceasing publication in the summer of that year.

It was successfully resurrected as a trade union paper in 1916 with Macarthur again as its editor. Its circulation now increased due to greater union membership during the First World War with NFWW branches established at munitions factories.
