= Workers' Institute =

Workers' Institute may refer to:

- Cradley Heath Workers' Institute, a museum building in the English West Midlands
- Miners' institute or mechanics' institute, buildings constructed for workers' education and meetings
- Workers' Institute of Marxism–Leninism–Mao Zedong Thought, a former English Maoist group
