= Winifred Blatchford =

English magazine editor and book critic (1882–1968)

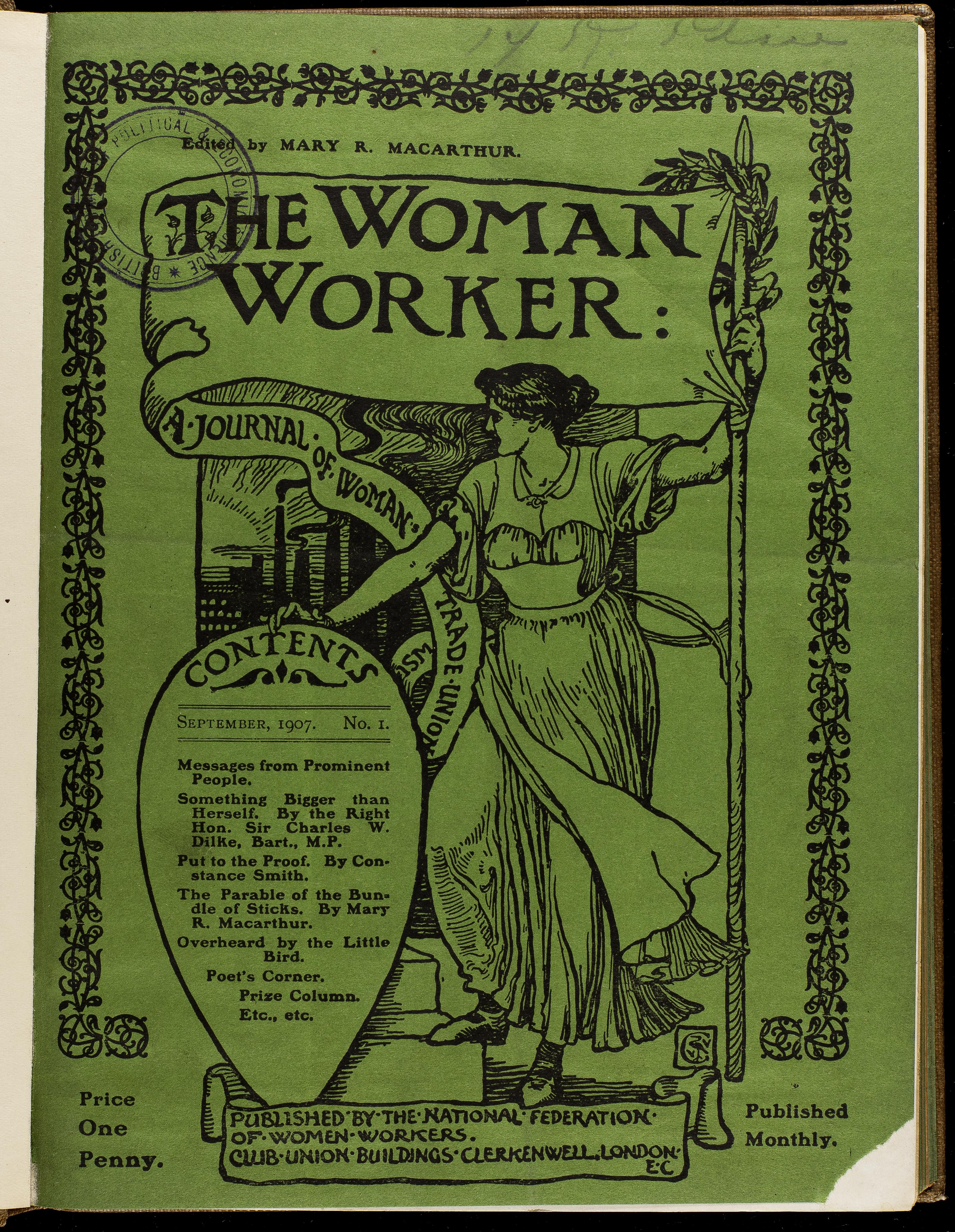
Blatchford edited the monthly magazine The Woman Worker.

Winifred Norris Blatchford (1882–1968) was an English magazine editor and book critic.

== Early life ==
She was the daughter of socialist Robert Blatchford and his wife Sarah, née Crossley. She had a sister, Dorothea Glanville Blatchford, and a brother, Corrie; their three other brothers died in infancy.

Winifred was warned by her father against marrying socialist politician Victor Grayson.

== Writing ==
In 1910, Winifred became editor of The Woman Worker, a monthly socialist magazine, which changed its name to Women Folk that year. Her writing condemned the exploitation of the working classes: 'I do not want any woman to slave her life away in shrieking, dinning factories, so that I may wear a woollen gown.'

During the early 1910s, Winifred also took over the book review column "In the Library" in The Clarion, the socialist newspaper founded by her father. She often referred to the "cosy nook" in her home where she read and wrote her book column, "thus giving her readers instructions on how to take pleasure in reading as a lifestyle practice that belonged to the socialist home."

== Later life ==
After the death of their mother in 1921, Winifred and her sister Dorothea lived with and cared for their father in Horsham, Sussex, until his death in 1943.
