= Jeannette Wilkinson =

British suffragist and trade unionist

Jeanette Gaury Wilkinson (19 March 1841 – 22 August 1886) was a British suffragist and trade unionist.

Born in Bermondsey, Wilkinson was privately educated in the nearby City of London. From the age of seventeen, she worked upholstering furniture, but in her spare time she studied economics, history and English literature at the Birkbeck Institute. In 1873, she won the Society of Arts prize for political economy.

Wilkinson became interested in trade unionism, and in 1875 she was elected as secretary of the London Upholsteresses' Society, a body affiliated to the Women's Protective and Provident League. She represented her union at nine conferences of the Trades Union Congress (TUC), where she made numerous speeches on working conditions for women, and called for specific legislation applying only to women to be repealed. She remained involved with these groups throughout her life, and in 1885 she moved a successful motion at the TUC in support of women's representation in Parliament.

Wilkinson qualified as a teacher in 1876, working at various London schools. However, by 1882, she had tired of the role, and instead became a clerk with the Vigilance Association for the Defence of Personal Rights. Two years later, she gave a speech at St James Hall in support of women's suffrage; this sufficiently impressed attendees that she was offered, and accepted, the post of organising secretary with the Bristol Society for Women's Suffrage. The group hoped that she would recruit working women to their cause, and she gave numerous speeches around the region, and in South Wales, with considerable success. In 1885, she moved back to London, becoming an organiser with, and lecturer for, the National Society for Women's Suffrage.

In 1885, Wilkinson also joined the Liberal Party, inspired by its support for Irish independence. She was rapidly elected to the executive committee of her local association, and gave speeches in support of numerous Liberal candidates at the 1885 general election. A contemporary described how 'she knew how to touch the feelings of her hearers, whilst her knowledge of economics, her clear insight into social matters, and her sound judgment, made her speaking both useful and effective.'

Wilkinson was increasingly affected by poor health, and died of asthmatic bronchitis in August 1886. An obituary in the National Reformer stated that 'Her untimely death was due to disease contracted during six weeks' starvation at a time when she was out of work, and had relations dependent on her exertions.'
