= A. T. Butler =

English architect

Albert Thomas Butler (18 January 1872 – 6 March 1952) was a prolific Black Country architect who worked from Cradley Heath and, later, from Dudley. Born in Cradley, Worcestershire, his work included the extension to Cradley Heath Church of England Infants' School, the offices of James Grove at Halesowen, and the Cradley Heath Workers' Institute. He was also responsible for modifications to the Guest Hospital. Butler also designed the 1931 extension to Halesowen Grammar School built by Alfred Simmonds, a subsidiary company of John Bowen & Sons the Birmingham builders.
