= William Tuckwell =

English clergyman and socialist

The Reverend William Tuckwell
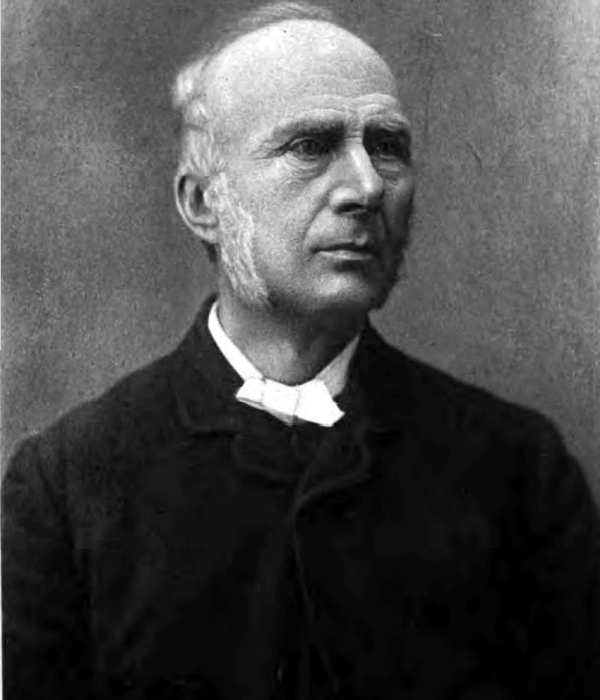
- Tuckwell in 1905
- Born: 27 November 1829; Oxford, England
- Died: 1 February 1919 (aged 89); Pyrford, England
- Spouse: Rosa (m. 1858)
- Children: Gertrude Tuckwell et al.
- Religion: Christianity (Anglican)
- Church: Church of England

William Tuckwell (27 November 1829 – 1 February 1919), who liked to be known as the "radical parson", was an English Anglican clergyman well known on political platforms for his experiments in allotments, his advocacy of land nationalisation, and his enthusiasm for Christian socialism. He was an advocate of teaching science in the schools.

== Life ==
Tuckwell was born on 27 November 1829. He was the eldest son of Margaret, née Wood (1803/4–1842) and William Tuckwell (1784–1845), a surgeon at the Radcliffe Infirmary in Oxford.

Tuckwell was educated at a preparatory school in Hammersmith before attending Winchester College from 1842 and New College, Oxford, in 1848.

From 1857 to 1864 he was headmaster of New College School. In 1864 the Warden of New College, Oxford, nominated him as headmaster of Taunton Grammar School, later known as Taunton College School. It was recorded that his "energy and vitality" increased the size and quality of the school.

In 1858 he married Rosa Strong (b. 1829/30), eldest daughter of Captain Henry Strong, an Indian army officer. Her younger sister was feminist and trade unionist Emilia Dilke. Rosa and William Tuckwell had four children, one son and three daughters. Their second daughter Gertrude Tuckwell CH (1861–1951) was a trade unionist, social worker, author, and the first woman magistrate appointed in London.

William Tuckwell died on 1 February 1919. His daughter Gertrude was his executor.

== The Reminiscences ==
He is best remembered as the author of Reminiscences of Oxford, which records the Oxford of the 1830s, but is somewhat misleading. Owen Chadwick records that he liked to "pretend to be much older than he was. ... What Tuckwell knew about were the fifties and sixties, and his portrait of Tractarian leaders is drawn from experiences in that later time; though quite often he likes to give the impression that it is much earlier."

His daughter was Gertrude Tuckwell, to whom his Reminiscences of a Radical Parson was dedicated.

== Christian socialism ==
Tuckwell became active in politics in February 1884, at the time of the great reform bill. His work among the poor had led him to enquire much about their conditions and lives.

Slowly, with much comparison, my conclusions were built up. I found that twentyone shillings in the country, thirty shillings in the town, was the smallest weekly sum on which a worker with wife and four young children could be maintained in decency and comfort; that the average wage throughout England was fifteen shillings in the country, twenty-five shillings in the town, in each case at least five shillings a week below the minimum of decency and comfort. The millions who were enchained by such conditions were further found to be not only underpaid but overworked, their hours of labour ranging from ten to seventeen hours a day; mind, taste, intelligence, starved through want of leisure. And it appeared, finally, that these unfortunates, thus underpaid and overworked, were in many places-rural places more especially, but not there alone-serfs at the mercy of their employers. Engaged on weekly tenure, dismissal hung ever over their heads. If anyone amongst them should attend a radical meeting, vote for a radical candidate, remonstrate against the foul surroundings of his home, omit to touch his hat to squire or to parson, he might be told - and to my knowledge often was told - that his services were no longer required. And to be thus discharged was in every case to be expatriated. Branded with the stigma of insubordination, he would find no employer in the neighbourhood to take him in; he must convey himself and his family to fresh woods and pastures new, removed as far as might be from his former home. Underpay, overwork, slavery-behold the inheritance of those millions whom parsons spoke of on week-days as "the masses," addressed as "dearly beloved brethren" on the Sundays.

Over the next ten years he delivered more than a thousand speeches in support of Christian socialism and in favour of a redistribution of wealth and land.

== Bibliography ==
- William Tuckwell, A. W. Kinglake: A Biographical and Literary Study
- William Tuckwell, The Ancient Ways: Winchester 50 Years Ago
- William Tuckwell, Horace, 1905. Google books edition
- William Tuckwell, Tongues in Trees and Sermons in Stones, 1891. Google books edition
- William Tuckwell, Reminiscences of a Radical Parson, 1905. Google books edition
- William Tuckwell, Reminiscences of Oxford, London: Cassell, 1901, expanded 2nd ed. 1908. Google books edition of 1908 edition
- William Tuckwell, Pre-tractarian Oxford: A Reminiscence of the Oriel 'Noetics'
- William Tuckwell, The New Utopia or England in 1985: A Lecture, 1885.
- William Tuckwell, Christian Socialism and Other Lectures, 1891.
- TUCKWELL, W. Science-Teaching in Schools. Nature 1, 18–20 (1869). https://doi.org/10.1038/001018d0

== See also ==
- Liberal Party (UK)
