= Emma Paterson =

English feminist and trade unionist (1848-1886)

- Born: Emma Anne Smith; 5 April 1848; London, England
- Died: 1 December 1886 (aged 38)
- Known for: English feminist and trade union activist

Emma Anne Paterson (née Smith; 5 April 1848 – 1 December 1886) was an English feminist and trade unionist.

== Life ==
Emma Anne Smith was born in London on 5 April 1848, the daughter of Henry Smith (died 1864), headmaster of a school in St George Hanover Square, and his wife Emma Dockerill.

In 1867 she became assistant secretary of the Working Men's Club and Institute Union, gaining trade union experience. In February 1872 she started working for the National Society for Women's Suffrage as their secretary. She resigned the post in 1873, when she married Thomas Paterson (1835–1882), a Scottish cabinet-maker and wood-carver active in the Working Men's Club and Institute Union, who had organized the Workmen's International Exhibition at the Agricultural Hall in 1870. The couple spent a long honeymoon in the United States.

In 1874 Paterson founded the Women's Protective and Provident League, after observing local New York organizations managed by women, including the Female Parasol and Umbrella Makers' Union and the Women's Typographical Union. The organization aimed at creating trade unions in all trades branded by working women. Paterson was honorary secretary and organizer of the Women's League until her death. Members of the Women's League included Helena Shearer. The members were largely upper-middle-class men and women interested in social reform, who wanted to educate women in trade unionism and fund the establishment of trade unions. With this group she helped organize a strike in Dewsbury of weavers.

At Paterson's suggestion, a similar organization was established in Bristol, called the National Union of Working Women. Paterson put emphasis on the importance of women in the labour movement and her league was initially aimed at establishing women-only unions. This was in part due to the resistance of some of the more traditional trade unions, some of whom believed that women should not work.

The first women's union founded by the league in London was the bookbinders' in 1874. Unions of upholstresses, shirt-makers, tailoresses, and dressmakers quickly followed. In 1875 Mrs. Paterson was a delegate to the Trades Union Congress at Glasgow as a representative of the bookbinders' and upholstresses' societies. No woman had been admitted to the congress before. She attended each succeeding congress (except that of 1882) until her death, and by her tact partially overcame the prejudices of the working-men delegates against female activists. In the league's behalf she repeatedly addressed public meetings in London, Oxford, and other cities in the provinces, and edited the Women's Union Journal, a monthly record of the league's proceedings, which was started in February 1876. Paterson was editor of the journal 1876-86. In 1876, Paterson had founded the Women's Printing Society at Westminster. She devoted all her spare energies to managing that, and personally mastered the printer's craft.

Paterson's husband died on 15 October 1882. In 1886 she published, with a memoir, a posthumous work by him, A New Method of Mental Science, with Applications to Political Economy. The views advanced were said by Paterson's DNB biographer to be "original and full of promise". In spite of increasing ill-health, Mrs. Paterson never relaxed her work until her death at her lodgings in Westminster on 1 December 1886; she was buried in Paddington cemetery.

Writing in 1913, Frederick Rogers, a union colleague and friend, said of her:

Without either physical attraction or charm, this quiet, shrewd little woman exercised an influence on the Labour movement which no other woman has equalled since her day, and its secret lay in her entire sincerity and absence of pose. She never cared for the limelight, and never thought herself great; but she was great in the truest sense of the word.

== Legacy ==
A fund, raised in Mrs. Paterson's memory, was employed in securing offices for the association in the buildings of the Workmen's Club and Institute Union in Clerkenwell Road, which were completed in 1893. In 1891 or 1903 the Women's Protective and Provident League was renamed the Women's Trade Union League. The failure of the trade union movement to embrace women into the movement is a reflection of the time and the role of women in that context. In general the demands of the WTUL were the same as other male unions, however it is notable for asking for maternity provision, co-operative homes for working women, and the vote for all women, not just women who were property owners.
