= Female Parasol and Umbrella Makers' Union of New York =

Labor organization for women in New York City

The Female Parasol and Umbrella Makers' Union of New York was a labor organization for women in New York City.

The group of umbrella and parasol seamstresses was formed in February 1870 with the assistance of Nelson W. Young, then president of the Workingmen's Union. They had annual picnics in Lion Park in 1870 and 1871. The last was said to have been attended by 6000 people and was claimed to include "debauchery without parallel", though this account was disputed by their president Ellen Leonard. The group had an office at the Cooper Institute. Their first action was to organize to protest an attempted 25% decrease in wages.

They went on strike on March 2, 1874. The group made umbrellas for Bamberger's and went on strike primarily to protest a decrease in wages. Bamberger's advertised in order to replace the striking workers with scabs but the union took out ads in the same newspapers warning against working there.

They have been cited as an influence for early womens' trade unions in Great Britain.
