= Emilia Dilke =

British author, art historian, and trade unionist (1840–1904)

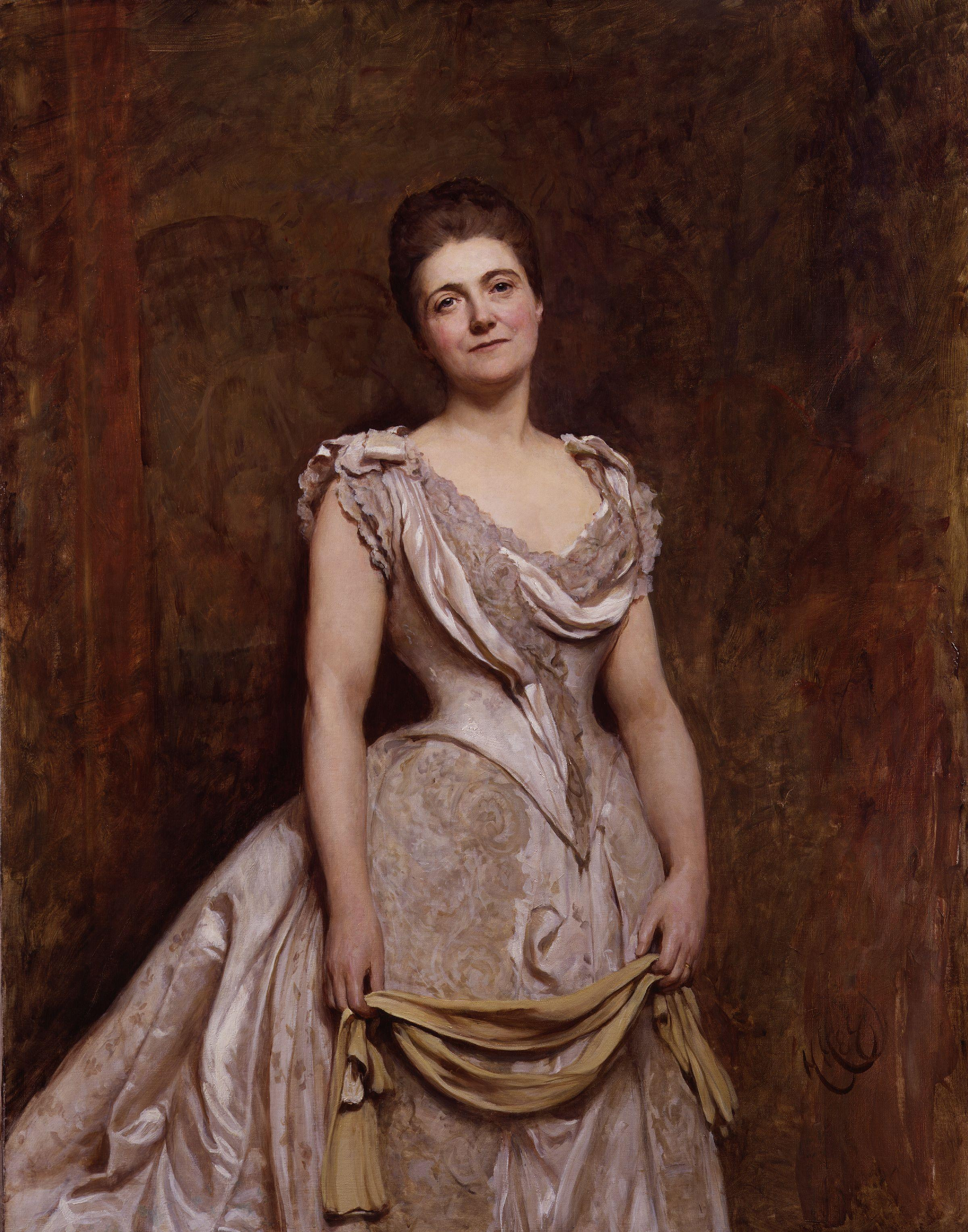
An 1887 portrait of Lady Dilke by Hubert von Herkomer

Emilia Francis Strong (2 September 1840, Ilfracombe, Devon – 23 October 1904), better known as Emilia, Lady Dilke, was a British author, art historian, feminist, suffragist and trade unionist.

== Early life and family ==
Emilia Francis Strong was born in 1840. She was the daughter of East India Company officer Henry Strong and his wife Emily Strong (née Weedon). She was called by her middle name, with its masculine spelling, during her childhood and youth. Her middle name was in honour of her godfather. She was raised in Iffley, near Oxford, and was educated by governesses before attending the South Kensington Art School in London in her late teens.

She married Mark Pattison, the humanist rector of Lincoln College, Oxford, in 1861. She was known after her marriage as Francis Pattison, Mrs. Mark Pattison, or, in some of her publications, as E. F. S. Pattison. She was much younger than her husband and they had an age gap of 27 years. Dilke was a close friend of George Eliot, and her first marriage may have been used as the model for the Casaubon's:

.... many contemporary readers immediately recognized her as the model for George Eliot's Middlemarch heroine, Dorothea Casaubon ...

After Mark Pattison's death in 1884, she married the Radical Liberal politician Sir Charles Dilke, and was subsequently known as Lady Dilke or Emilia Dilke. Both of her marriages were topics of some public discussion.

== Career ==
Dilke initially wrote as a historicist on the philosophy of art, then became a contributor to the Saturday Review in 1864. She was subsequently and for many years a fine-art critic in the Academy periodical and from 1873 to 1883 was appointed as art editor. She also published in numerous other journals in Britain and France, such as the Westminster Review.

In addition to numerous signed and unsigned essays, and her major works of art history, she wrote essays on French politics and on women's trade unionism and women's work. She also published two volumes of supernatural short stories (a third part-volume appeared posthumously).

She was involved with the Women's Protective and Provident League, founded by Emma Paterson and later known as the Women's Trade Union League (WTUL), from near its inception in 1874. She served as President of the WTUL from 1886 until her death in 1904. She supported protective legislation for women.

Dilke was also active in the campaign for women's suffrage. She is known to have attended an early women's suffrage meeting at Albert Hall in London, sitting with Millicent Fawcett and Harriet Grote, and became secretary of the Oxford branch of the National Society for Women's Suffrage.

Her niece and friend, Gertrude Tuckwell (daughter of her sister Rosa and brother-in-law the Reverend William Tuckwell) worked with her closely in her feminist and trade unionist activities, later becoming the first woman magistrate in London in 1919.

== Works ==
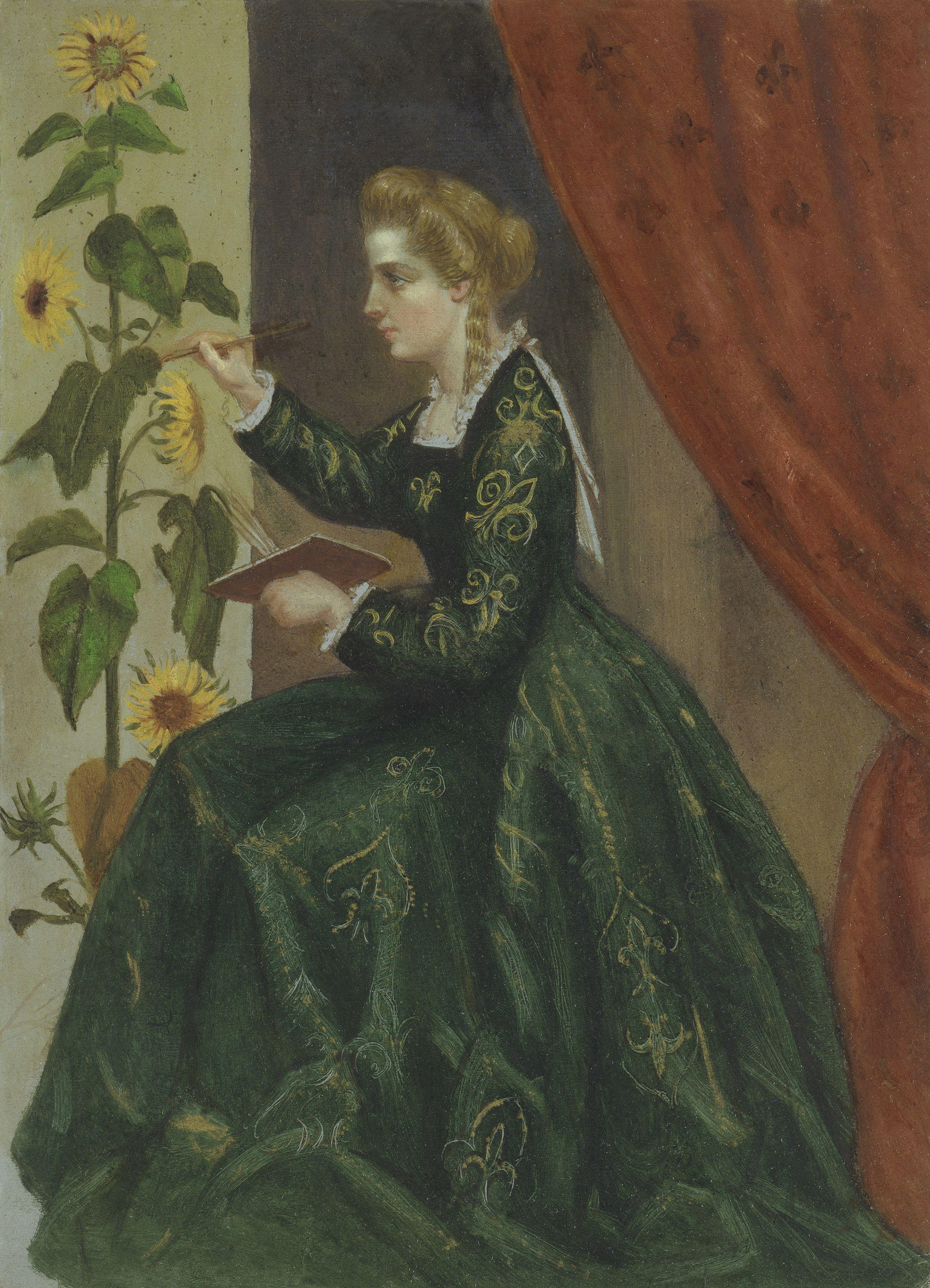
Portrait of Emilia Dilke by Laura Capel Lofft (afterwards Lady Trevelyan), circa 1864

In addition to numerous articles in periodicals, she published, under the surname Pattison:

- The Renaissance of Art in France, 2 vols. (London, 1879)
- "Sir Frederic Leighton, P.R.A.". In Illustrated Biographies of Modern Artists, e.d. Francois G. Dumas (Paris, 1882).
- Claude Lorrain, sa vie and ses oeuvres (Paris, 1884)

Under the surname Dilke, she published the following books:

- Art in the Modern State (London, 1888)
- French Painters of the Eighteenth Century (London, 1899)
- French Architects and Sculptors of the Eighteenth Century (London, 1900)
- French Engravers and Draftsmen of the XVIIIth Century (London, 1902)
- French Furniture and Decoration in the Eighteenth Century (1901)
- The Shrine of Death and Other Stories (London,1886)
- The Shrine of Love and Other Stories (London, 1891)
- The Book of the Spiritual Life, with a memoir of the author (1905) Stories and essays; memoir by Charles Dilke.
- The Outcast Spirit and Other Stories (Snuggly Books, 2016) Contains most of her fiction.
