= Gertrude Tuckwell =

English trade unionist, social worker, author, and magistrate

Gertrude Tuckwell CH
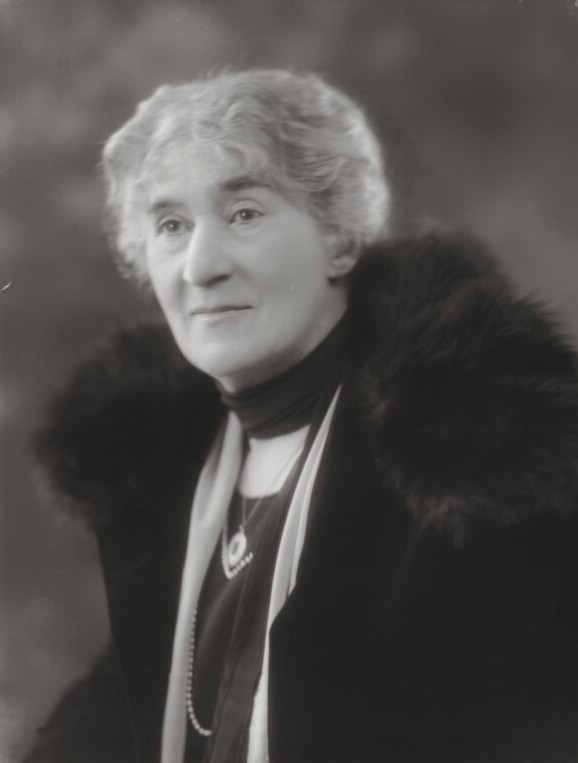
- Tuckwell in 1930
- Born: Gertrude Mary Tuckwell; 25 April 1861; Oxford, England
- Died: 5 August 1951 (aged 90); Guildford, England
- Occupations: Trade unionist; social worker; author; magistrate
- Political party: Labour Party
- Parents: Rosa; William Tuckwell

Gertrude Mary Tuckwell CH (25 April 1861 – 5 August 1951) was an English trade unionist, social worker, author, and magistrate.

== Early life and education ==
Gertrude Mary Tuckwell was born in Oxford on 25 April 1861, the second daughter of Rosa née Strong (b. 1829/30) and William Tuckwell, master of New College School and chaplain at New College, Oxford and the self-proclaimed "radical parson". Her mother was the eldest daughter of Captain Henry Strong, an Indian army officer, whose younger sister, feminist and trade unionist Emilia Dilke, would have a profound effect on Tuckwell's life. Tuckwell had one brother and two sisters.

She was home-schooled in her family's Christian socialist tradition and trained to be a teacher in Liverpool from 1881.

== Career ==
Tuckwell was a teacher at Bishop Otter College in Chichester from 1882 to 1884, and then taught at a working-class infant school in Chelsea until forced to stop by ill health in 1890.

From 1893, she became secretary to her maternal aunt, writer, suffragette and trade unionist Emilia Dilke (wife of Sir Charles Dilke). She published The State and Its Children in 1894, opposing child labour. She was involved with the Women's Trade Union League from 1891, and succeeded Emilia Dilke as its President in 1905. In 1908 she became president of the National Federation of Women Workers, and campaigned to protect women from industrial injuries such as lead poisoning and phossy jaw.

In 1908 she was described in The Woman Worker newspaper as "the power that moves a myriad organisations. Behind a screen of plans to abolish sweating, to organize women, to prohibit poisonous glazes in pottery, to indemnify victimized workers, her alert spirit is tirelessly in motion". She retired in 1918, but continued to campaigning on public health issues. After Charles Dilke died in 1911, she, as his literary executor, co-wrote a two-volume biography with Stephen Gwynn ("begun by Stephen Gwynn, M. P., completed and ed. by Gertrude M. Tuckwell").

She was her father's executor when he died in 1919, and he had previously dedicated his 1905 book Reminiscences of a Radical Parson to her.

== Work as a Magistrate ==
After the Sex Disqualification (Removal) Act 1919 became law on 23 December 1919, Tuckwell was one of the first seven women appointed as a Justice of the Peace, and she was the first woman magistrate in London.

Alongside the other six women appointed in 1919, Tuckwell was tasked with drawing up a list of women suitable for appointment as JPs from across the United Kingdom. A list of 172 new women magistrates for England was published in July 1920, with most of those connected with the labour movement suggested by Tuckwell.

She was a founder member of the Magistrates' Association in 1920, and was a member of its council from 1921 to 1940. She was the chair of the National Association of Probation Officers from 1933 to 1941. In 1930 she was inducted into the Order of the Companions of Honour.

Tuckwell spent the last twenty years of her life at Little Woodlands, Wormley, Surrey. She died on 5 August 1951 at the Royal Surrey County Hospital in Guildford.

Legacy

Her papers are lodged in the TUC Library Collections at the London Metropolitan University. These consist of approximately 700 folders of reports, pamphlets, leaflets and press cuttings accumulated by Tuckwell, regarding women's political and economic struggles from 1890 to 1920.

In October 2026, English Heritage unveiled a blue plaque in Tuckwell's honour at Westminster Mansions, Little Smith Street, London, her home during the time she played a key part in the establishment of the National Federation of Women Workers and National Anti-Sweating League.

== Bibliography ==
- The State and Its Children (1894)
- The Life of the Rt. Hon. Sir Charles W. Dilke, Bart., M. P. begun by Stephen Gwynn; completed and edited by Gertrude M. Tuckwell (Volume I) London: John Murray, 1917
- The Life of the Rt. Hon. Sir Charles W. Dilke, Bart., M. P. begun by Stephen Gwynn; completed and edited by Gertrude M. Tuckwell (Volume II) London: John Murray, 1917

== See also ==
- Christian Social Union (UK)

Trade union offices
Preceded by Mary Macarthur	President of the National Federation of Women Workers; 1911–1918	Succeeded by Agnes Lauder
