= Ann Ellis (strike leader) =

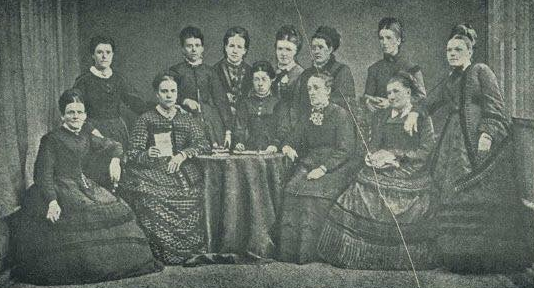
- The women-only union committee of 1875
- Born: Ann Waite; 28 June 1843; Guiseley, Yorkshire, England
- Died: 8 September 1919 (aged 76); Bradford, Yorkshire, England
- Occupation: weaver
- Known for: leading a weaver's strike

Ann Ellis born Ann Waite (28 June 1843 – 8 September 1919) was an English power loom weaver and a trade union leader. She became the main person in a new textile union that led a successful three-month strike that was notably led by women in 1875.

== Life ==
Ellis was born in 1843 in Guiseley in Yorkshire. She was one of several children born to Hannah Whalley (born Sladen) and a clothier named Samuel Waite. She was their third child and she was baptised and schooled in Guiseley. At some point the Waite family moved to Batley and she went to work as a power-loom weaver.

In January 1875 owners of the shoddy mills in Batley proposed to reduce the workers' wages. The weavers of Batley decided to strike in early February against this proposal and within days they were joined by fellow weavers at mills in Dewsbury. Ann strongly opposed this proposed wage cut and on the 13 February 1875 stood on a platform facing a crowd of 9,000 who gathered to hear her speak near Spinkwell Mills in Dewsbury. Ann was quoted in the local Huddersfield Examiner saying the owners could stand to reduce profits, but the workers could not live on less to eat. Speeches like this made Ann Yorkshire's recognised leading trade unionist and both male and female weavers voted for Ann to lead them. Ellis was the committee's treasurer and Hannah Woods was the president. The secretary was Kate Conran.

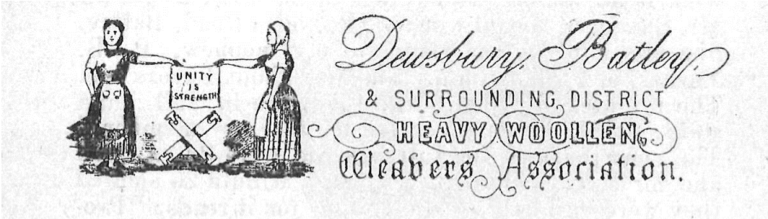
The Dewsbury and Batley Weavers Committee was composed of thirteen women and no men

The committee had some unproductive talks with the mill owners. In mid February the mill owners upped the stakes, when they created a lock-out that put 25,000 people out-of-work. In April, the Dewsbury, Batley, and Surrounding Districts Heavy Woollen Weavers’ Association was enrolling more men and women into the union. The National Union of Working Women wanted to create women-only unions and the men were invited to join men-only unions, but the association's members remained loyal.

After three months the mill owners settled and wage levels were restored in all the mills, bar two. The union became the Dewsbury and District Heavy Woollen Weavers Association. This union eventually became part of the British General Union of Textile Workers which in time became Unite.

Ellis continued to support the labour movement and equality for women. She argued against laws that would prevent women from working in a way that was different from men. She would speak each year at conferences across the UK until 1885 when her employers in Batley dismissed her after she addressed another conference. She found herself without a job and she took domestic work in Brighton to obtain a living. Ellis moved back to Yorkshire and did some foster care. She died in a hospital in Bradford in 1919. Middle-class women were then allowed to vote.
