= Cradley Heath Workers' Institute =

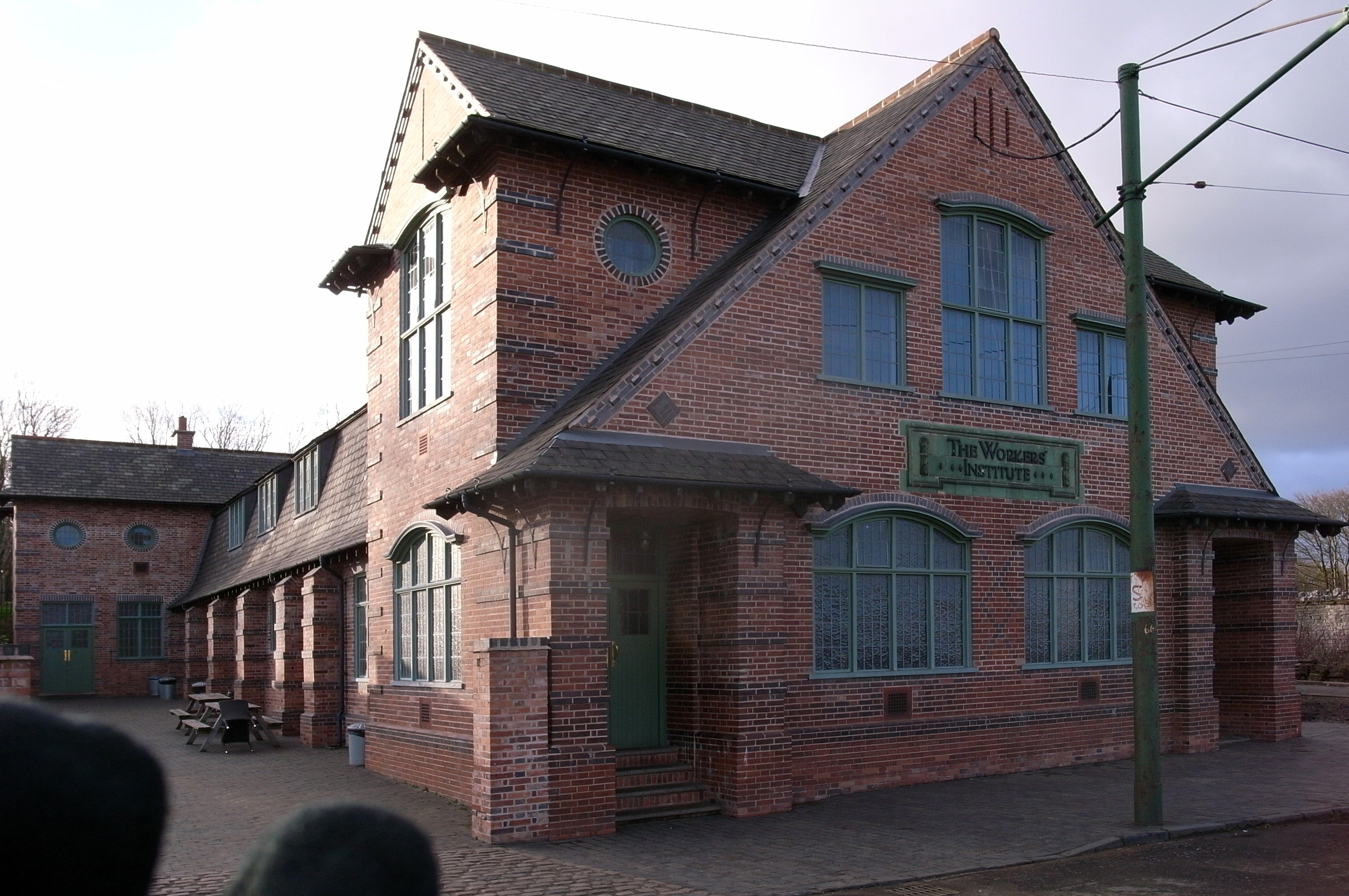
- Interactive map of the Cradley Heath Workers' Institute area

General information
- Status: Preserved
- Type: Workers' Institute
- Location: Black Country Living Museum, Tipton, England
- Coordinates: 52.52248°N 2.07750°W
- Groundbreaking: 1911
- Completed: 1912

Design and construction
- Architect: A T Butler

The Cradley Heath Workers' Institute (known locally as the 'Stute') was built between 1911 and 1912 in Lomey Town, Cradley Heath, West Midlands, England. It was built as a social centre for the people of Cradley Heath and surrounding areas within the Black Country, intended to become a venue for educational meetings and lectures. It also housed Union offices, where members could come to seek guidance, and from which the Contributory Unemployment Fund would be distributed. In 2006 the building was threatened by a bypass and so was moved to the Black Country Living Museum in a collaborative project including Sandwell MBC, Midlands TUC and funded by the community and the Heritage Lottery Fund.

== Design and construction ==
The Institute's architect was local man A. T. Butler. With its projected gables, leaded windows, exposed brickwork and signage in green tiles, the building is a demonstration of Arts and Crafts style.

== History ==
Construction of the Institute was funded using money left over from the strike fund of the 1910 Women Chainmakers' Strike, led by the charismatic union organiser and leader Mary Macarthur. The dispute ended on the 22 October 1910 when the last of the employers agreed to pay the minimum wage.

Between 1915 and 1933 it largely functioned as a cinema. It was then used as a billiards hall until 1950, after which it became a postal sorting office until 1995. In 2004, the building was threatened by demolition due to the construction of a new road bypass. Sandwell MBC approached the BCLM and with members of the community including the Midlands TUC and members of trade unions, a campaign was launched to save it. Supporters were invited to sponsor a brick and in 2006 the Heritage Lottery Fund awarded the museum a £1.5M grant to take the building apart brick by brick and rebuild it at the Museum in Dudley.

Until the campaign to save the Workers' Institute, the story of the Women Chainmakers' Strike of 1910 had largely been forgotten. 2005 saw the first Women Chainmakers' Festival in association with the Midlands TUC and many unions, hosted at the museum. Now, the annual Women Chainmakers' Festival, which is still organised by Midlands TUC, is held in Cradley Heath, most recently at the Mary Macarthur Memorial Gardens on the site of the original strike meeting ground (next to the former site of the Workers' Institute). The building contains period offices, which are demonstrated by Museum staff, and an exhibition about Mary Macarthur. The original auditorium now houses a café for the museum and the stage is sometimes used for special events.
