= The Cinderella Movement =

19th century children's welfare movement

The Cinderella Movement was a late nineteenth century British movement to provide food and entertainment for poor children. Individuals formed "Cinderella Clubs", named after the fairy tale character Cinderella, to address specific problems associated with children's welfare.

== History ==
Towards the end of the nineteenth century conditions in many cities had become truly appalling. Poverty, disease, overcrowding were widespread despite the fact that Britain was undergoing a period of unprecedented prosperity. The division between classes was marked at all levels but that between manual workers and white collar workers was vast.

Many people debated and discussed the problems at length and various movements began to end this problem by a variety of social and political reforms. A few people took positive action and endeavoured to make practical immediate changes. One of these was Robert Blatchford.

Blatchford was a journalist based in Manchester, co-founder and editor of the Clarion Newspaper. He saw the poverty that existed among mill-workers and the existence that many of them lead and he resolved to do something about it. He started by writing articles encouraging like-minded readers to join him in the formation of groups who would provide food and entertainment for the children forced to live in industrial slums. They quickly became known as Cinderella Clubs after the popular pantomime character who is transformed from a child drudge. Julia Dawson was the first National Secretary and she made a significant role in managing the clubs, which provided food and entertainment to children in poverty.

On hearing about Blatchford’s activities or reading his articles in other papers many formed their own Cinderella Clubs. Some members went further and helped the infant Independent Labour Party to become established, others tackled educational problems but all had the core belief in an end to the deprivation suffered by tens of thousands of working class children.

== Today ==
Little remains of that vast surge of benevolence but its effects are still around. There is still one city, Bradford, with an active Cinderella Club.
