= Cycling club =

Society for cyclists

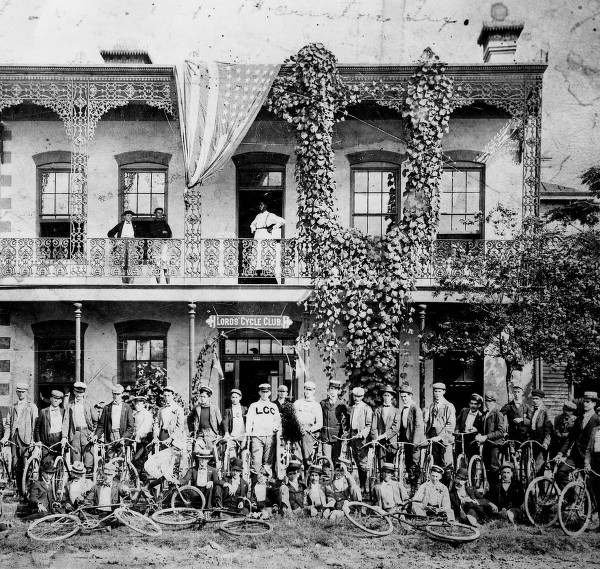
Lord's Cycling Club in Houston, Texas (1897)

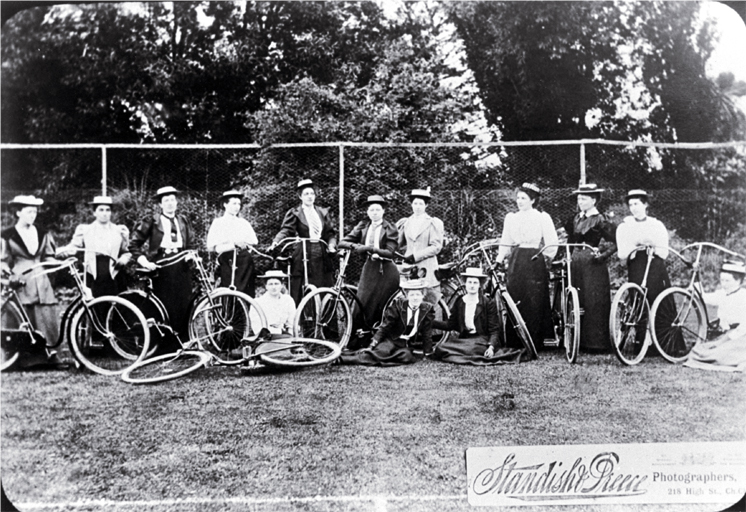
The Atalanta Ladies' Cycling Club (ca. 1892)

A cycling club or cycling organisation is a society for cyclists. Clubs tend to be mostly local, and can be general or specialised. They can focus on cycle racing and/or cycling as a means of transport (utility cycling). In the United Kingdom, for example, the Cyclists' Touring Club, (CTC) is a national cycling association; the Tricycle Association, Tandem Club and the Veterans Time Trial Association, for those over 40, are specialist clubs. Members of specialist or national groups often also belong to local clubs.

Other groups support leisure cyclists or campaign for improved facilities for cyclists. The London Cycling Campaign, Friends of the Earth, and Greenwich Cyclists are examples of campaign groups.

== History ==
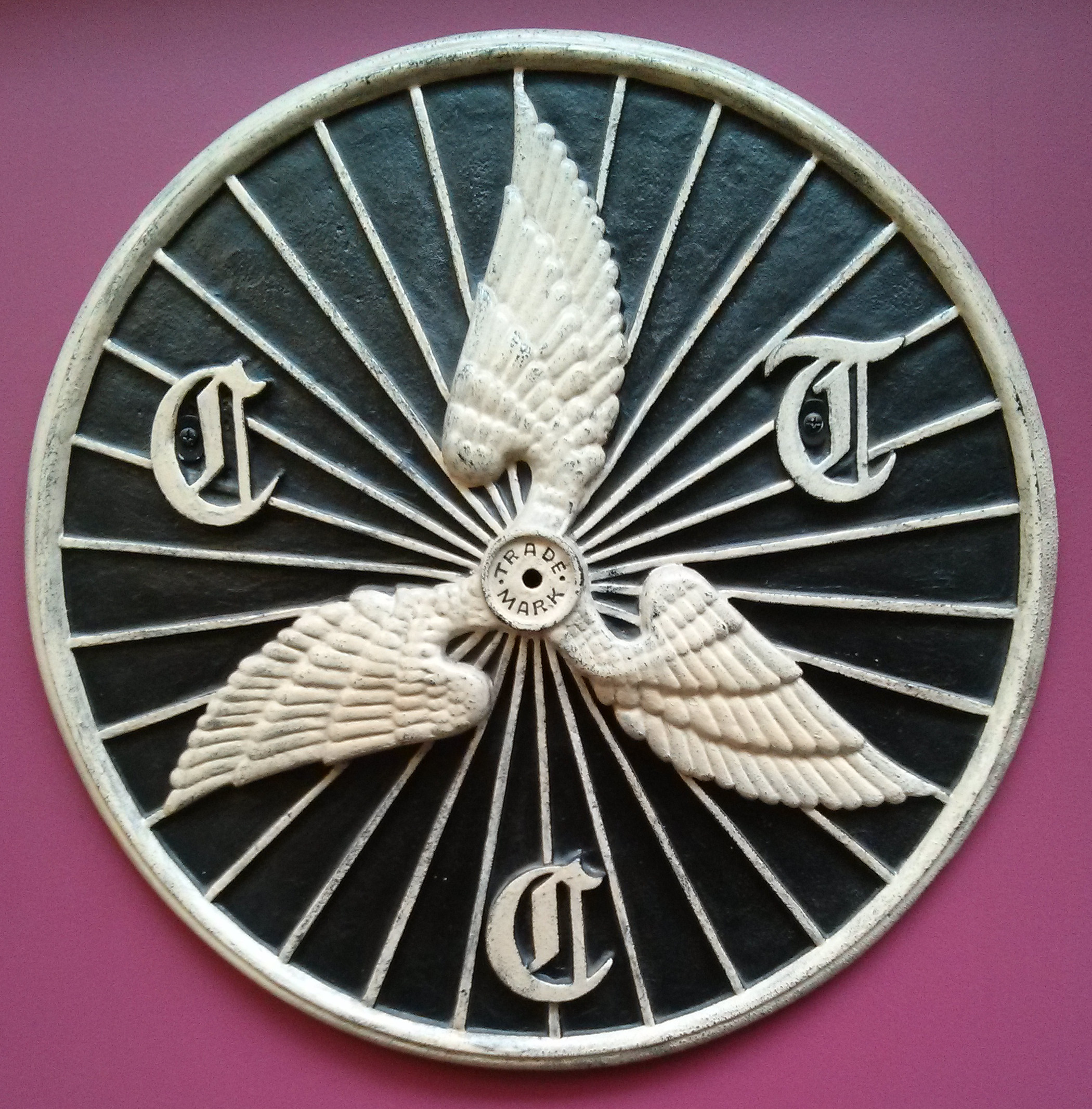
Old CTC sign on display at the National Museum of Scotland

Cycling clubs flourished in 19th century in a time when there were no commercial cars on the market and the principal way of transportation was horse-drawn vehicles. Among the oldest is the Bicycle Touring Club, later the Cyclists' Touring Club and today Cycling UK, formed in 1878. The oldest continuously active club under the same name is believed to be the Anerley Bicycle Club founded in Surrey, England in 1881. The earliest women's cycling club in Australasia, the Atalanta Cycling Club, was established on 18 August 1892.

== Local associations ==
=== Activities ===
A cycling club's activities vary from one aspect of cycle sport to a range of cycling and social activities. Racing clubs organise competitions for members and others, including track cycling, cyclo-cross, road bicycle racing and time trials. Most competitive cyclists belong to a club affiliated to one of the national racing associations, such as British Cycling and Cycling Time Trials in the UK, and may also organise training through BC or ABCC-qualified coaches. Riders often race in their club's colours.

Cycling clubs may offer touring, weekly club rides (traditionally on Sunday mornings), regular meetings and social events.

=== Sponsorship ===
Some clubs are sponsored by commercial organisations; riders often wear clothing bearing advertising in return for the sponsor's support.

=== Names ===
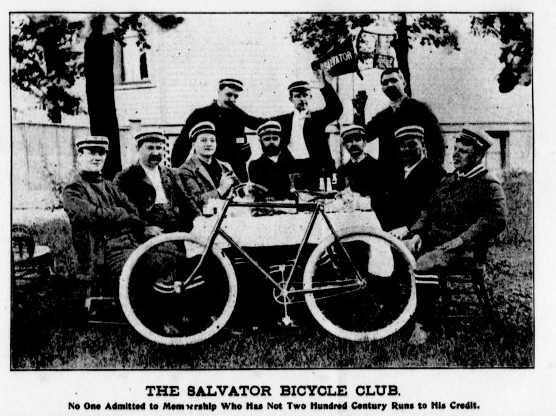
The Salvator Bicycle Club, 1897

Many clubs are named after their home town or district. A few clubs are named after the topography of their region, such as the Alpine Bicycle Club of Golden, Colorado. Some have no connection, such as the Acme Wheelers in south Wales, Zenith CC in Leicester, Gemini BC in north-west Kent.

Some call themselves Road Clubs (examples in Britain include Warrington Road Club, Leicestershire Road Club and Archer RC). Others use a title such as Coureurs or Velo (for example, Clayton Velo, Yorkshire Velo, Rugby Velo, Thames Velo, VC Elan, VC Londres or Velo Sport Jersey), using non-English names that reflect the origins of cycle-racing in France. Another common title is Wheelers - for example, Huddersfield Star Wheelers. Some club names are formed from multiple words - for example, Echelon Velodynamics Bicycle Club.

Some UK club names have roots in political or social movements. The National Clarion Cycling Club spread socialist ideas by bicycle in the late 1890s and early 1900s. The name remains - Bury Clarion, Crewe Clarion, Fenland Clarion, London Clarion, North Cheshire Clarion, Nottingham Clarion, etc - but the politics has mostly disappeared. Other names reflect historical religious allegiance, such as Manchester St Christopher's Catholic Cycling Club) or jobs: RAF CC, Northumbria Police CC, GB Fire Service Road Team, Army Cycling Union. Others evoke the wandering nature of cycling - '34 Nomads, Altrincham Ravens, Lewes Wanderers, Colchester Rovers - or an aspiration: Norwood Paragon, Sheffield Phoenix, Dulwich Paragon.

The early 21st century has also seen the development of internet-based clubs (e.g.: i-Team.cc, and Team Internet).

== National and transnational associations ==
Cycling organizations or cycling associations are organizations for cyclists, bicycle sports and bicycle mobility, bicycle touring, advocating bicycle-friendliness and the bicycle and cycling in general. As such, they generally support sustainable transport. Larger national organizations, may have arisen from older, local cycling clubs.

=== Activities ===
Most associations have the commonality that they aim to promote cycling as an everyday activity, e.g. commuting. When the focus is on a specific aspect of cycling, we can distinguish between:

- Racing organizations.
- Tours and travel associations.
- Advocacy associations.
- Educational associations: with an emphasis on e.g. bicycle safety

== Mobility vs. sports ==
Most organizations lean towards either cycling as a mobility or bicycle / BMX racing. The political goals can be quite different, because cycling as a mobility is an everyday issue and pervades questions about environmentalism, transport and sustainability. Sports associations emphasize the event character of cycling and do not usually try to advocate the aspects of bicycle as regular traffic vehicles.

== See also ==
- Adventure Cycling Association
- Association for the Urban Mobility on Bicycle
- Mobility as a service
- Bicycle-sharing system
- Global Alliance for EcoMobility
- Ixion Bicycle Club (1885)
- League of American Bicyclists
- World Cycling Alliance
