= Lizzie Glasier =

Scottish socialist activist

- Born: Elizabeth McNicoll; 9 May 1869; Glasgow, Scotland, United Kingdom of Great Britain and Ireland
- Died: 15 January 1947 (aged 77); Rochford, Essex, England, United Kingdom
- Other names: Elizabeth Glasier Foster
- Occupation(s): Lecturer, editor
- Known for: Helping to initiate the Socialist Sunday School movement
- Movement: Socialist; Socialist Sunday School
- Spouse: Frederick George Foster (married 1914)
- Relatives: John Bruce Glasier (brother); Katharine Glasier (sister in law)

Lizzie Glasier (married name: Elizabeth Glasier Foster; 9 May 1869 – 15 January 1947) was a Scottish socialist lecturer, activist, and pioneer of Socialist Sunday Schools.

== Early life ==
Elizabeth Glasier was born in 1869, the daughter of John Bruce and Isabella McNicoll. John Bruce had eloped with the much younger McNicoll around 1857, leaving his wife Elizabeth Lindsay and their three children. A number of children born to Bruce and McNicoll were registered over subsequent years, with the surname McNicoll, but those of Elizabeth and her brother John Bruce Glasier (who gave his birth date as 25 March 1859) do not appear to have been. After John Bruce's death in December 1870, Isabella adopted the surname Glasier. In 1891, Isabella and her children were living in Govan, with Elizabeth listed as a "Teacher of music".

On Isabella Glasier's death in 1911, she was mourned by the Labour Leader as "the mother and inspirer of one of the earliest pioneers and two of the most devoted propagandists of our gospel". As well as her children, the funeral was attended by Ramsay MacDonald and Ethel Bentham.

Glasier married press reporter Frederick George Foster in Camberwell, London in 1914. Foster was also involved in socialism and education.

== Socialist Sunday Schools ==
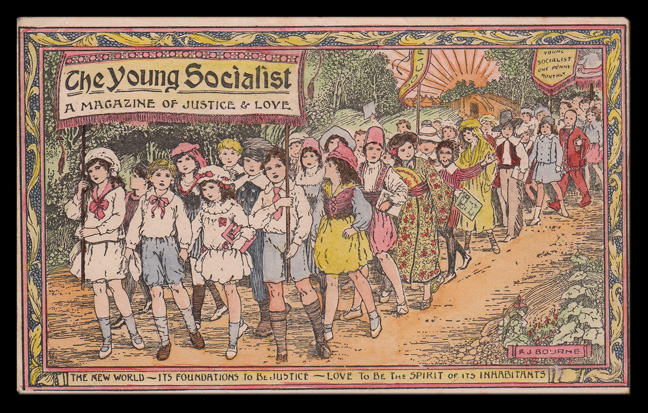
Promotional postcard for The Young Socialist magazine, circa 1905.

A member of the Glasgow Women's Labour League (of which she became president), in 1895 Lizzie Glasier wrote to the Labour Leader canvassing for the idea of establishing classes for children connected with "every branch of the I.L.P. and other Socialist bodies throughout the country". On 2 February 1896, socialist lecturer Caroline Martyn, called a meeting to form the Glasgow Socialist Sunday School, becoming its secretary.

This has been described as the origin of the modern Socialist Sunday School movement, and what became a nationwide network of Socialist Sunday Schools. F. Reid described the work of "second-rank adherents [of the Labour movement] who achieved no national prominence", like Lizzie Glasier and Archie McArthur, as being particularly important to the development of the Socialist Sunday School movement.

Lizzie Glasier edited the monthly magazine The Young Socialist. In its pages, she gave outspoken support to the demands of workers in the strikes involving seamen, dockers, railwaymen, and miners 1911–12. Editorship was taken over in the 1920s by Glasier's friend May Westoby.

In 1907, Glasier responded to an attack by some of Glasgow's Christians which suggested that Socialist Sunday Schools were irreligious. Her pamphlet was titled A Reply to the Sabbath school teacher's Magazine. She argued elsewhere that socialism was the highest religion, writing:

Socialism contains in itself a system of ethics which when brought into operation, and practised by humanity will lead to the perfect fulfilment of that highest and holiest aspiration of all religions—The Brotherhood of Man.... It has become as a religious faith, which no opposition or persecution is likely to weaken or dim; which no discouragement can turn its disciples aside from.

In addition to her work for the Labour movement, Glasier became well known for her work on behalf of children. She wrote four volumes on the decorative forms of school needlecraft, which influenced methods used in schools – its general methods being incorporated into The Handbook of Suggestions to Teachers, issued by the Board of Education in 1927. She was also a founder and Principal of the E.N.A. School of Needlecraft, which instructed teachers in new methods, seeking particularly to abolish minute sewing, which she viewed as injurious to young children.

Glasier also wrote and privately published a pamphlet about John Bruce Glasier's poetry.

== Later years ==
In her later years, she and her husband lived with Katherine Bruce Glasier at Glen Cottage, Earby. In West Craven, she remained active in working with children and mothers, including as part of the Clinic Sewing Circle, and the Nursing Association. A regional paper described her as "frail in physique, but lion-hearted".

Elizabeth Glasier Foster died in January 1947 at Southend Municipal Hospital, Rochford, following a fall some weeks earlier.

Glen Cottage, preserved in memory of Katherine Bruce Glasier, later became a youth hostel.
