= Jeannie Mole =

English trade union organizer

Harriet Fisher Mole
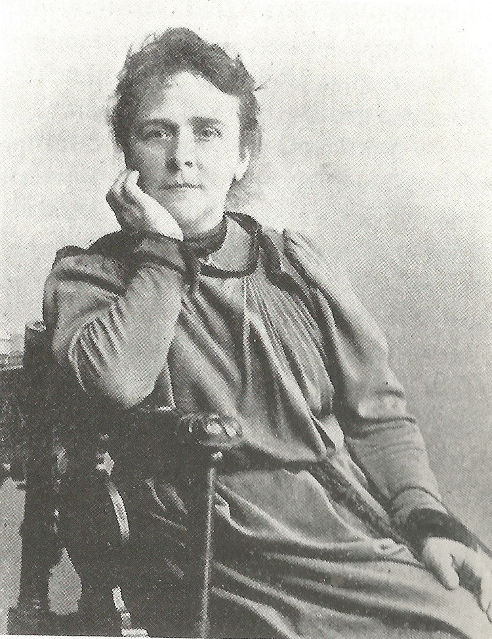
- Born: Harriet Fisher Jones; 2 May 1841; Warrington
- Died: 15 April 1912 (aged 70); Paris
- Other name: Jeannie Mole

Harriet Fisher Mole (née Jones; 2 May 1841 – 15 April 1912), known as Jeannie, was a British socialist, feminist, and trade union organiser in Liverpool. Arriving there in 1879, Mole was instrumental in bringing socialism to Liverpool, as well as setting up a number of societies to encourage trade unions amongst Liverpool's female workforce. She supported strikes to improve the workforce's conditions, especially to remove fines.

Mole was also a supporter of dress reform, set up a socialist food van and advocated at a coroner's investigation for the family of a woman killed in an industrial accident, ensuring the family received compensation and encouraging the jury to recommend safety improvements as part of the verdict.

== Biography ==
Harriet Fisher Jones was born on 2 May 1841 in Warrington to her father, Evan Jones, a tinsmith, and his wife, Harriet Jones. As she and her mother shared the same name, she became better known as Jeannie. In 1860, she married a fruit merchant, Robert Willis, and the couple travelled to New York City, where she took an interest in the black rights movement. On her return to England, she and her husband settled in London and had a son, Robert Frederick Evan Willis, better known as Fred. Willis spent some time helping the poor in the slums of London. She was heavily influenced by the works of Thomas Carlyle and John Ruskin, setting her on the path of socialism.

In the late 1870s, Willis divorced her husband and remarried. Her new husband was another fruit merchant, William Keartland Mole, who was also the son of a wealthy Liverpool jeweller. William was 22 at the time, and the marriage was witnessed by Mole's son, as well as her brother. The family moved to Liverpool, living on Bold Street. It was there that she began her lifelong ambition to improve the lives of those in poverty within Liverpool.

Mole suffered a heart attack in 1896, likely due to excessive work and the ensuing illness lead to her taking a step back from organisational work the following year. Her son, Fred, died in 1905. On 15 April 1912, whilst on holiday in Paris, Mole died.

== Feminist and socialist work ==
Finding just six socialists in Liverpool, Mole started propaganda meetings in her home with the support of her husband and son. These meetings lead to the formation in 1886 of the Worker's Brotherhood, the first socialist society in Liverpool. The Brotherhood, despite never achieving great numbers, went on to help form the Liverpool branch of the Fabian Society in 1892. Mole became vice-president of the Liverpool Fabian Society in 1895. She also focused on more practical solutions for social issues, for example, funding a "socialist food van" at a cost of £55 6s 5d (Note: According to MeasuringWorth.com, £55 6s 5d in 1895 was worth approximately £22,150.00 in 2014.) and campaigning for a "people's hall" in Liverpool for the working class.

"Many of [them] rise before five, tidy their little homes, prepare the day's food and pass the factory gate after a walk of two miles before the steam whistle stops shrieking at 6:30... So many of them receive only a few shillings a week, and have to tramp a long way to reach cheap shelter, and are not able to afford out of their wages such food as would give them energy and vigour. Sometimes, then, it happens that a woman hears the dreaded whistle stop when she is quarter of a mile away, and then she knows that some of her hard earned wage will be kept back from her."

— Jeannie Mole, describing the plight of women workers in Liverpool

Mole was an early follower of dress reform, a feminist movement against the cumbersome garments of the Victorian era, and would regularly wear an outfit reminiscent of Greek robes. She gave the pattern to Caroline Martyn and Julia Dawson, who wore similar outfits.

In 1888, Mole and the Workers' Brotherhood started to campaign to unionise the female workers in Liverpool into female-only unions. They started working with the Women's Protective and Provident League (WPPL), calling for the founding of a local branch, and in January 1889, the group set up the Liverpool Workwomen's Society, representing bookfolders, tailors, and cigar makers, with Mole acting as secretary. Women were over-represented in these poorly paid trades, with four women for every man working in them. The society relaunched the following year as "Liverpool Society for the Promotion of Women's Trade Unions", expanding its membership to other trades in reaction to Liverpool City Council's inaction over sweating systems in the area. Mole helped set up specific unions, such as one for (primarily Chinese) laundresses and washerwomen. Around the same time, the House of Lords launched a select committee on sweating systems, with the ensuing publicity encouraging the group to take further action.

In 1894, Clementina Black set up the Women's Industrial Council; soon after, Mole helped found a Liverpool branch in which she was the secretary. The council helped form unions for upholsteressess and marine-sorters, as well as worked with the other groups set up by the Workwomen's society. In her role, Mole also stepped up inquiries into working conditions for women; for example, when an industrial accident killed a woman at the Old Swan Rope Works in Liverpool, Mole attended the case as secretary of the 'society for inquiring into the conditions of working women'. She ensured that a factory inspector attended, that the jury made recommendations to prevent future accidents, and that compensation was paid to the woman's next of kin.

In 1895, Mole leveraged her position in the Liverpool Women's Industrial Council (LWIC) to encourage a strike amongst Liverpool's women ropemakers to stop fines on top of loss of wages for petty misdemeanors such as turning up late. Despite the successful outcome of the strike, the section of the LWIC led by Eleanor Rathbone wanted to focus on "social investigation" and disapproved of the action, leading Mole to disassociate herself from the group. Mole also created and edited the "women's page" of the Liverpool Labour Chronicle newspaper.

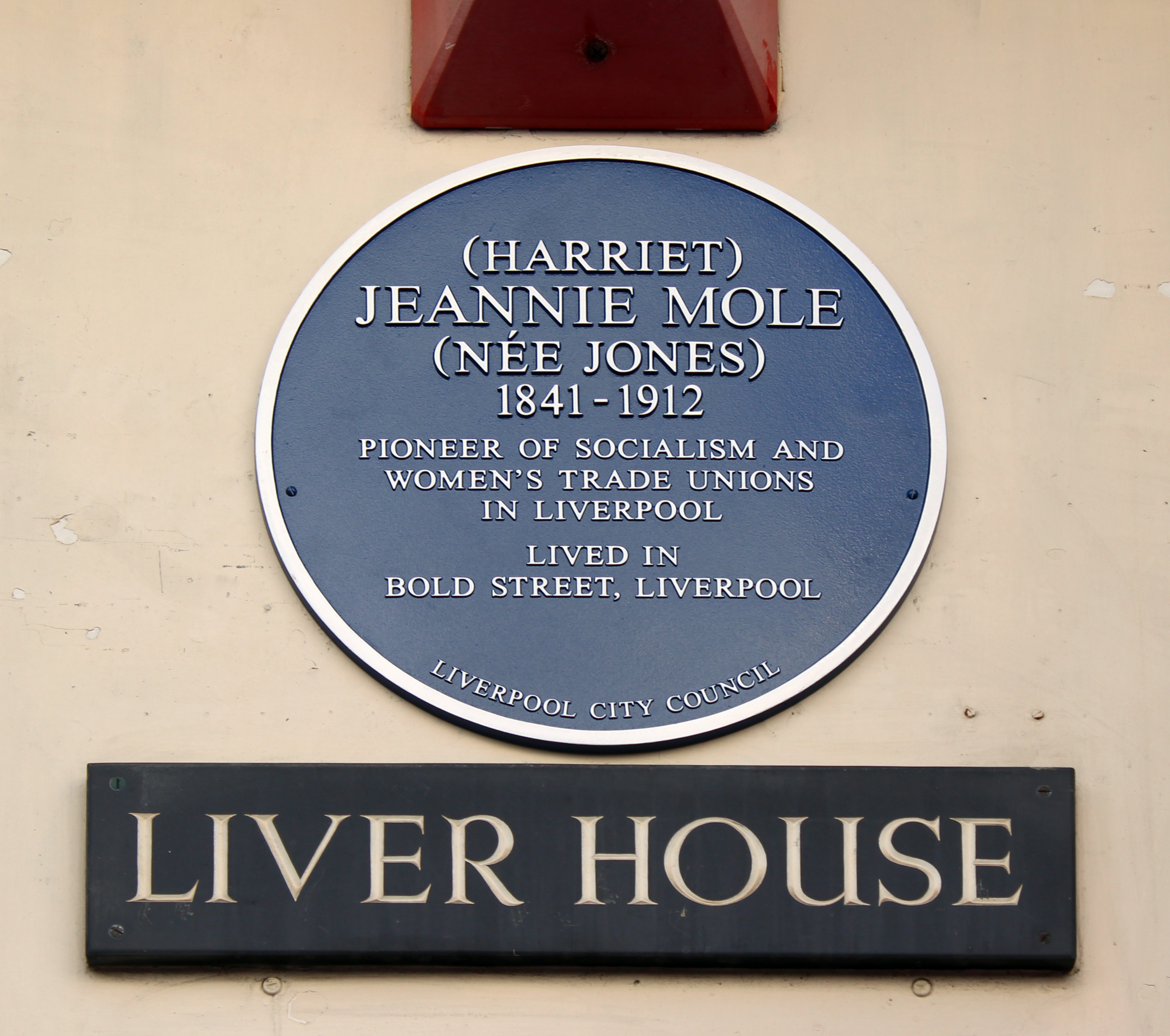
Memorial plaque to Mole at 96 Bold Street, Liverpool
