= Holmesfield =

Village in Derbyshire, England

Coordinates: 53°17′43″N 1°31′05″W

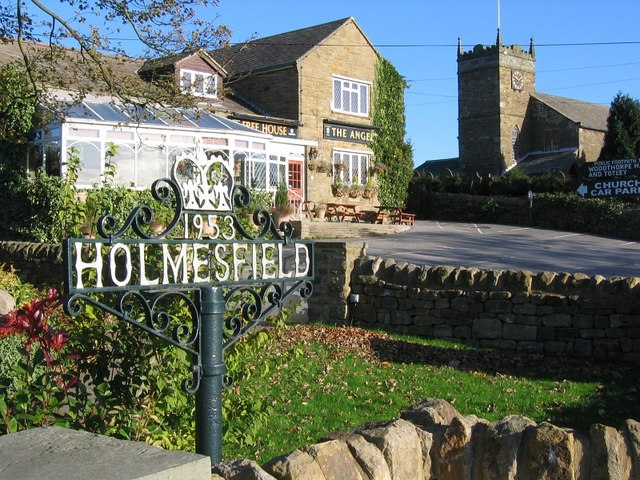
- Holmesfield parish church and The Angel public house

- Location within Derbyshire
- Population: 971 (2011)
- OS grid reference: SK322776
- District: North East Derbyshire
- Shire county: Derbyshire
- Region: East Midlands
- Country: England
- Sovereign state: United Kingdom
- Post town: DRONFIELD
- Postcode district: S18
- Police: Derbyshire
- Fire: Derbyshire
- Ambulance: East Midlands
- UK Parliament: North East Derbyshire

Holmesfield is a village and civil parish in the English county of Derbyshire. The population of the civil parish at the 2011 census was 971. The name "Holmesfield" means "raised pasture-land" and is of Norse and Anglo-Saxon origin. Viking influences are also evident with many road names suffixed by "gate", the old Norse word for "way".

== History ==
Holmesfield is mentioned in the Domesday Book of 1086 as one of the manors belonging to Walter D'Aincourt.

John Frescheville, 1st Baron Frescheville, was in 1645 ordered to pay an annuity to the Vicar of Holmesfield Church, as part his fine, for being on the losing side in the civil war.

St Swithin's parish church can be seen from much of the surrounding area. The main church was built in 1826 but has seen further work in recent years with the vicarage being added in 1999. Still visible in the grounds are the remains of a stone cross from around 641 AD, which would have replaced an original wooden cross erected by monks to mark the place where they would preach. The base of the stone cross now holds a sundial.

== Geography ==
Holmesfield is sited at approximately 800 feet (240 m) above sea level on the edge of the Peak District National Park, with extensive views from the village over the surrounding hilly terrain. The parish includes a number of farming hamlets such as Millthorpe situated in the neighbouring Cordwell Valley, and Cowley, which lies on the road from Holmesfield to the town Dronfield. Peak District Boundary Walk runs through Millthorpe.

== Notable buildings ==
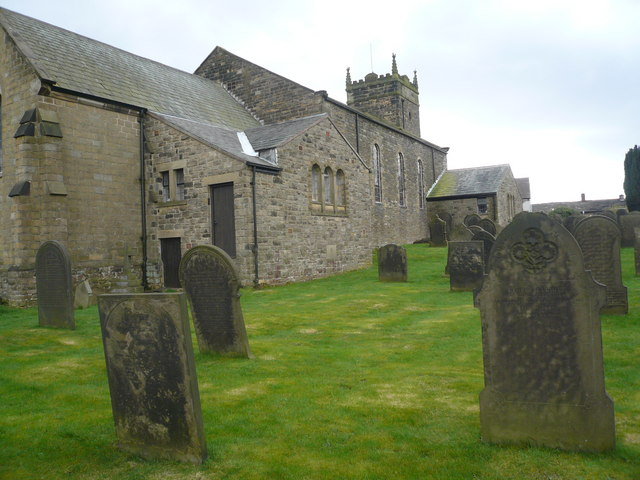
St. Swithin's Church

Within Holmesfield civil parish are 43 structures that are listed by Historic England for their historic or architectural interest. None is listed as Grade I but there are five structures (Cartledge Hall, Holmesfield Hall, Unthank Hall, farm outbuildings east of Holmesfield Hall, and an outbuilding southwest of Unthank Hall) that are listed as Grade II*. The other structures, including Woodthorpe Hall, Cartledge Grange and the parish church, are listed as Grade II.

== Notable residents ==
Notable people who live or have lived in Holmesfield parish include:

- Edward Carpenter (1844–1929), socialist and poet, lived at Millthorpe.
- Robert Murray Gilchrist, novelist, lived and died at Cartledge Hall, buried in the parish churchyard.
- George Merrill (1867–1928), lived at Millthorpe as Edward Carpenter's partner, and on whom the character Alec Scudder in E. M. Forster's novel Maurice is based.
- G.H.B. Ward, activist for ramblers' rights, co-founder of the Clarion Ramblers in Sheffield and Labour Party politician.
- Mark Roe, professional golfer.

== Amenities ==
Holmesfield has a village hall, a riding school, and a Victorian-built primary school, called Peny Acres Primary School. A Thai restaurant that closed in 2018. There are three pubs within the village (The Rutland Arms, The George and Dragon, and The Angel Inn) and a further three elsewhere within the parish (The Royal Oak at Millthorpe, and The Peacock and The Moorlands at Owler Bar). The village no longer has a shop or post office. There is a regular farmers’ and artisan market held in the village, usually on four dates throughout the year. The COVID-19 pandemic meant that no markets were held in 2020, but they recommenced in July 2021. The market is normally situated at the Angel Inn and St. Swithin's Church Hall.
