= Schooling for "Good Rebels" =

1993 book by Kenneth Teitelbaum

- Author: Kenneth Teitelbaum
- Subject: History of education
- Publisher: Temple University Press
- Publication date: 1993
- Pages: 258
- ISBN: 0-87722-980-5

Schooling for "Good Rebels": Socialist Education for Children in the United States, 1900–1920 is a 1993 book by historian Kenneth Teitelbaum on Socialist Sunday Schools in the United States in the early 20th century.
