= Merrie England =

Merrie England may refer to:

- Merry England, an idealised conception of pastoral English life
- Merrie England (opera), a 1902 comic opera by Edward German
- Mutiny Bay (Alton Towers), a theme park area formerly known as Merrie England

== Books ==
- Merrie England – in the Olden Time, an 1842 book by George Daniel
- Merrie England (Robert Blatchford book), an 1893 book of essays on socialism by "Numquam", pseudonym of Robert Blatchford
- Merrie England, a 1964 novel by Paul Johnson

== See also ==
- Victoria and Merrie England, an 1897 ballet by Carlo Coppi
