= The Clarion (British newspaper) =

UK socialist periodical, 1891–1934

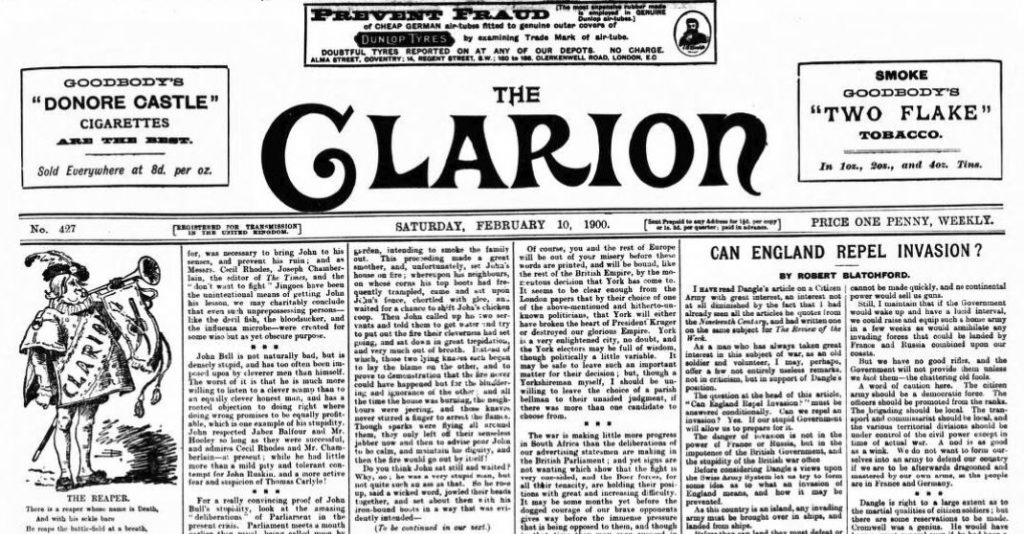
- 10 February 1900
- Type: Newspaper
- Publisher: Robert Blatchford
- Founded: 1891
- Ceased publication: 1934
- Political alignment: Socialist
- Country: United Kingdom

The Clarion was a weekly newspaper published by Robert Blatchford, based in the United Kingdom. It was a socialist publication with a Britain-focused rather than internationalist perspective on political affairs, as seen in its support of the British involvement in the Anglo-Boer Wars and the First World War.

== History ==
=== Founding ===
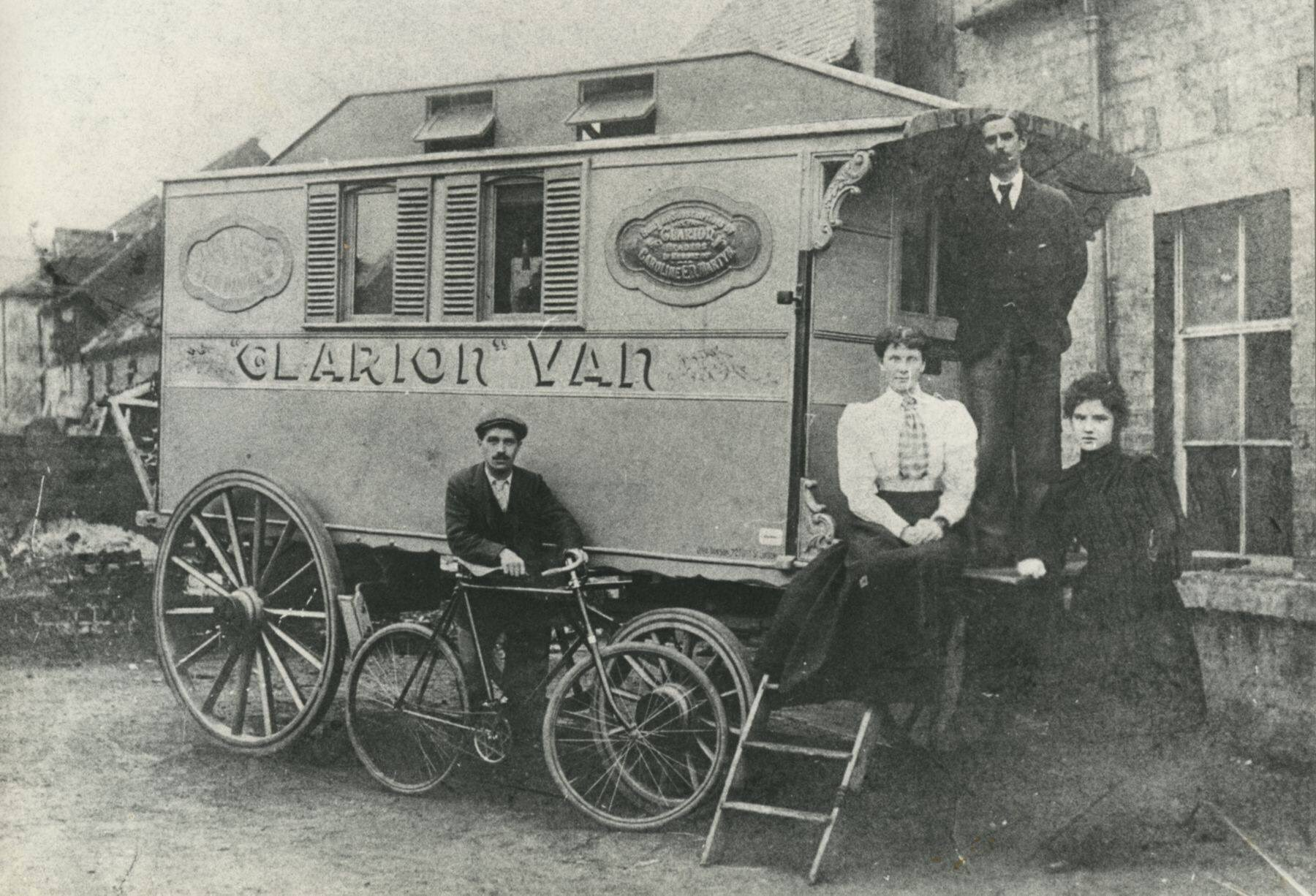
Julia Dawson's Clarion Van number One was named for the Scottish socialist Caroline Martyn

Blatchford and Alexander M. Thompson founded the paper in Manchester in 1891 with capital of just £400 (£350 from Thompson and Blatchford, and the remaining £50 from Robert's brother Montague Blatchford). Robert Blatchford serialised his book Merrie England in the paper, and also published work by a variety of writers, including George Bernard Shaw, and artwork by Walter Crane. The women's column was written initially by Eleanor Keeling Edwards and, from October 1895, as the women's letters page by Julia Dawson, the unmarried name of Julia Myddleton-Worrall. It was Julia Dawson who pioneered the Clarion Vans, which toured small towns and villages throughout England and Scotland from 1896 until 1929, spreading socialist messages.

A large number of associated clubs and societies (cycling, rambling, handicrafts, field, drama and Cinderella clubs, as well as "vocal unions" or choral societies) connected with the paper were created, of which the National Clarion Cycling Club still survives, as does the People's Theatre, Newcastle upon Tyne, which began its life in 1911 as the Newcastle Clarion Drama Club. The Sheffield Clarion Ramblers were founded in 1900 by G. H. B. Ward, a Labour politician; it is recognised as the first working class rambling club, and survived until 2015.

On 27 June 1904, three weeks before the King Edward VII and Queen Alexandra opened Liverpool Cathedral, Jim Larkin and Fred Bower, workmen on the site, composed a message "from the wage slaves employed on the erection of this cathedral" to a future socialist society, and, along with a copy of the Clarion and the Labour Leader, placed it in a biscuit tin deep inside the brickwork and covered it.

Emil Robert Voigt (1883–1973), an English-born engineer and former activist in the Clarion movement in Manchester, was one of the pioneers of the Australian broadcasting industry in the early 1920s and the man behind the birth of the progressive radio station 2KY.

=== Decline and closure ===
The paper enjoyed sales of around 30,000 copies a week for many years, but some readers gave it up after it argued in favour of the Second Boer War and against even limited women's suffrage. Circulation rose again as it became associated with the Labour Party and by 1907 it had reached 74,000. In 1912, Rebecca West became a contributor to The Clarion. The paper again lost readers when it supported the First World War. It closed in 1931.

Despite, or because of, its popularity, the Clarion was viewed with suspicion by both parliamentary and Marxist socialists, and has been treated as little more than a footnote in histories of English socialism. Margaret Cole wrote: "There never was a paper like it. It was not in the least the preconceived idea of a socialist journal. It was not solemn; it was not highbrow … It was full of stories, jokes and verses, sometimes pretty bad verses and pretty bad jokes, as well as articles."

Robert Blatchford stated in his book My Eighty Years:

I will go as far as to say that during the first ten years of the Clarion's life that by no means popular paper had more influence on the public opinion in this country than any other English journal, The Times included.

The Clarion was also popular in some other countries in the British Empire, especially New Zealand and Australia. A Clarion Colony was established in New Zealand in 1901 by William Ranstead. At least one Clarion Cycling Club was established in New Zealand, at Christchurch in the 1890s.

== Legacy ==
The New Clarion, founded in 1932, carried similar socialist and recreational content. Many of the cycling, rambling, theatre and other social clubs associated with the original Clarion continued, leaving a diverse legacy.

The title The Clarion was adopted by another left-wing publication in late 2016. It is produced monthly as a "socialist magazine by Labour and Momentum activists". The magazine's editorial board consists of activists from various socialist traditions.
