= National Clarion Cycling Club =

British cycling club

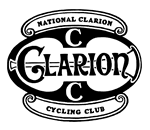
- Formation: Easter 1895 in Ashbourne
- Type: cycling club
- Legal status: current - continuous operation and membership since its formation in 1894
- Purpose: The Clarion’s objects shall be: To protect and further the interests of cycling and cyclists. To promote Mutual Aid, Good Fellowship and support for the Principles of Socialism.
- Region served: Great Britain
- Members: as of 2017, c1900 members, organised in 29 sections
- Official language: English
- Main organ: Boots & Spurs
- Affiliations: British Cycling, Cycling Time Trials
- Website: http://www.clarioncc.org

The National Clarion Cycling Club is a British cycling club founded in 1894, and which retained strong links with the labour movement through the 20th century. At its peak, in 1936, it had 233 UK sections and 8,306 members. In 2021, it replaced its “support for the principles of socialism” with support for “fairness, equality, inclusion and diversity”. Today it has some 30 member sections across Great Britain and over 1,900 members.

== History ==
=== Clarion Cycling Clubs ===
The first club was formed in February 1894 in Birmingham, England as the Socialists' Cycling Club. At its second meeting, it renamed itself the Clarion Cycling Club after The Clarion socialist newspaper. This was at the peak of the bicycle boom, when the old penny-farthing had been swept away by the new safety bicycle, the diamond-frame design widely used today.

By the end of 1894, readers of The Clarion formed local socialist cycling clubs in five industrial centres: Birmingham, The Potteries, Liverpool, Bradford and Barnsley.

In 1895 at Ashbourne, Derbyshire the five clubs gathered for their first annual Easter Meet. Together they formed the National Clarion Cycling Club, which is

"the association of the various Clarion Cycling Clubs for the purpose of Socialist propaganda and for promoting inter-club runs between the clubs of different towns".

=== Clarion Scouts ===
In 1894 a writer in the Clarion under the pen-name "Numquam" suggested a "cycling corps of Clarion Scouts". That summer, a meeting between The Potteries and Birmingham Clarion Clubs decided to put it into effect: "scouts" using their cycling trips to circulate socialist leaflets and copies of the Clarion wherever they visited.

In November 1894, members of the Bradford and Liverpool CCC's campaigned for socialist candidates in local council elections. By the end of that year, 22 of the Bradford CCC's 25 members were working as Scouts, distributing propaganda to villages around the town. In March 1895 a new socialist magazine, The Scout, was launched for Scouts to read and circulate. It was subtitled "A Monthly Journal for Socialists" and its first edition included a set of "Instructions for Scouts" written by The Clarion's editor Robert Blatchford. The Clarion Clubs also did much to circulate The Clarion, Blatchford's book Merrie England and the socialist ideas that they expressed.

When the Clarion Clubs were formed, socialists in Britain were divided between the Social Democratic Federation founded in 1881, the Independent Labour Party founded in 1893 and smaller organisations. The Labour Representation Committee that evolved into the current Labour Party was not founded until 1900. Clarion Scouts were encouraged to support either SDF or ILP candidates in elections, and Scouts in districts that lacked local socialist groups were encouraged to form either a local group of either SDF or the ILP, and to build unity between the disparate organisations of Britain's labour movement.

The number of local Clarion Clubs/sections grew to 30 by the end of 1895, including London Clarion Cycle Club, and 70 by the early part of 1897. They reached the peak of their extent and influence in 1914, when their Easter Meet was at Shrewsbury. The illustrator and socialist Walter Crane designed the National Clarion Cycle Club's letterhead.

The Clarion membership reached its peak in 1936, with 233 sections across the UK and 8,306 members. At that time they had an educational scheme within the National Council of Labour Colleges.

Membership then fell, to 5000 by 1951, 4000 by 1953, 3000 by 1957, 2000 by 1961 and 1000 by 1965. From 2000, the Clarion limped along with only 500-600 members until 2010, when sections were urged to support youth development, and new sections were encouraged. This coincided with a UK 'golden era' of international cycling success; it had 1,300 members in 30 sections in 2014, and by the end of 2017 membership reached 1,895 members.

== Modern Clarion movement ==
Since 2007, the Clarion Cycling Club has doubled its membership to over 2,000 members across some 14 sections. In 2024, the club had active sections in Brighton & Hove, Cotswold, Fenland, Heanor, Gosport, Ironbridge, Lancashire (Barnoldswick, Blackpool, Clitheroe), Greater Manchester (Bolton, Bury, Manchester, Saddleworth, Stockport), London Clarion Cycle Club, North Cheshire, Nottinghamshire (Nottingham, Tuxford), Scotland (Coatbridge, West Lothian), Sunderland, Teesside, and Yorkshire (Calder, Yorkshire Coast). A 'private' membership category caters for members who do not live close to a regional section or who do not want to join a local club.

Today the Clarion stands less for political activism and more for all forms of cycle activities, including cycle touring, sportives, time trials, road, track and cyclo-cross racing. The staple diet of the Clarion cyclist is the club run, an organised group ride, usually at a weekend, covering distances from 20 miles to over 100 miles in a day.

The club has a biannual newsletter, Boots and Spurs, and holds an annual conference.

In June 2021, an AGM of the National Clarion Club voted to remove a reference to socialism from its constitution. A majority of members felt it was "divisive and non-inclusive". Two-thirds voted to replace “support for the principles of socialism” with support for “fairness, equality, inclusion and diversity”. Critics accused the club of "trying to erase history" and warned the step may lead to a breakaway organisation.

=== Splintering ===
Concerns about dilution of the Clarion's political aims had already created splinter clubs. In 2006 the National Clarion Cycling Club 1895 (North Lancs Union) was formed as a breakaway group from the original National Clarion CC. According to the splinter organisation's secretary Charles Jepson, writing in 2021, it was established "to protect the (original National Clarion CC) founders' commitment to 'combine the pleasures of cycling with the propaganda of socialism'".

== Sporting successes and champions ==
The Clarion has several champions among its membership including:

- Barry Hoban started cycling with Calder Clarion in 1955, and later claimed many European victories as well as stages of the Tour de France.
- Adrian Timmis, formerly of Hednesford (Cannock Chase Clarion), was a prolific national champion and major European stage racer.
- Chris Newton, formerly of Teesside Clarion, won the 2002 world points race championship on the track and other world, Olympic and Commonwealth medals.
- Adam and Simon Yates, members of Bury Clarion, are current professional cyclists for UAE Team Emirates and Team Jayco–AlUla, respectively. Simon is the only British-born rider to win the Vuelta a España.
