= Laurence Thompson (journalist) =

British journalist (1914–1972)

- Born: 1914; Cambridge, England
- Died: 6 June 1972 (aged 57–58)
- Occupation: Journalist

Laurence Victor Thompson (1914 – 6 June 1972) was a British journalist.

== Career ==
He was the chief political correspondent for the News Chronicle. During the 1956 Suez Crisis, Thompson dissented from the critical line taken by the paper's editor, Michael Curtis, and supported Anthony Eden's decision to retake the Suez Canal by force. Curtis allowed Thompson to air his views on the paper's feature page. The News Chronicle's circulation declined, which Geoffrey Goodman attributed to its opposition to Suez, and the paper folded in 1960. Thompson then worked for The Observer. During his later career, he was an assistant editor of ITV News and he also worked for BBC External News.

His biography of the socialist writer Robert Blatchford was published in 1951. Thompson toured England between late 1950 and early 1951, and his impressions were published under the title Portrait of England: News from Somewhere (1952). Thompson derived the subtitle from William Morris's News from Nowhere, which had, according to Thompson, predicted 1952 as "the year of revolution from which Utopia sprang". A Time to Laugh (1953) is a comic novel about the son of an African chieftain who enrols as a soldier in the Second World War. In its review, The Times called it "an acute and brilliantly suggestive little study... The comedy of the last third of the book is beautifully done".

His history of the Metropolitan Police, The Story of Scotland Yard (1954), was recommended by the Washington State Office of Superintendent of Public Instruction for inclusion in school libraries. They said that "boys will be fascinated by the many true details of the work of Scotland Yard". Thompson's 1956 work, The Challenge of Change, was published by Oxford University Press and discussed the work of the Duke of Edinburgh's Commonwealth Study Conference. The review in Engineering said the book was a "brilliant and racy description". In 1940: Year of Legend, Year of History, Thompson examined Britain's "finest hour" during the Second World War. A. J. P. Taylor said that it "disturbs many complacent versions".

His last published work was The Enthusiasts, a sympathetic joint biography of the socialist politicians John Bruce Glasier and Katharine Glasier. At the time of his death he was writing a history of the Labour Party.

== Personal life ==
Thompson married Margot Burrows (29 December 1914 – 19 December 2003) in 1940, during an air raid. They had met while working for Film Pictorial.

== Works ==
- Robert Blatchford: Portrait of an Englishman (London: Victor Gollancz, 1951).
- Portrait of England: News from Somewhere (London: Victor Gollancz, 1952).
- A Time to Laugh (London: Andre Deutsch, 1953).
- The Story of Scotland Yard (New York: Random House, 1954).
- The Challenge of Change (London: Oxford University Press, 1956).
- 1940: Year of Legend, Year of History (London: Collins, 1966).
- The Greatest Treason: The Untold Story of Munich (New York: W. Morrow, 1968).
- The Enthusiasts: A Biography of John and Katharine Bruce Glasier (London: Victor Gollancz, 1971).
