= Owler Bar =

Coordinates: 53.299°N 1.561°W

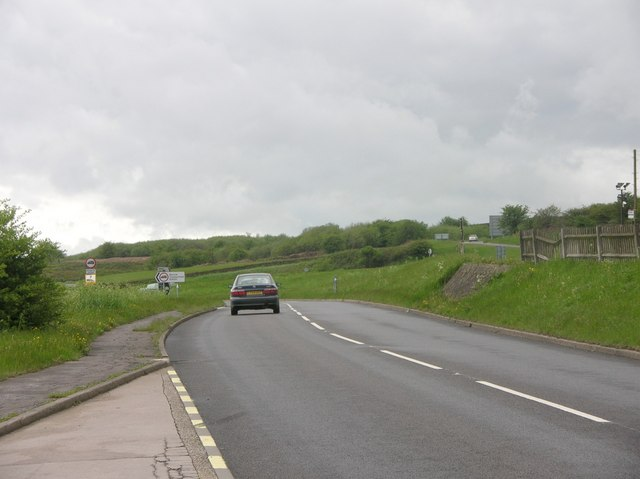
- Owler Bar.

- Location within Derbyshire
- OS grid reference: SK293780
- Civil parish: Holmesfield
- District: North East Derbyshire
- Shire county: Derbyshire
- Region: East Midlands
- Country: England
- Sovereign state: United Kingdom
- Post town: HOLMESFIELD
- Postcode district: S17
- Police: Derbyshire
- Fire: Derbyshire
- Ambulance: East Midlands

Owler Bar is a small area of settlement and locally important road junction in the parish of Holmesfield, Derbyshire, England. It lies at an altitude of 305 metres and is just south of the county border with Sheffield, on the edge of the Peak District National Park. It lies five miles (8.0 km) west of the town of Dronfield and is where the A 621, B6054 and B6051 roads meet. The junction of the roads takes the form of an unusually large roundabout, or one-way system.

Despite its small size, the hamlet has two pubs: the Peacock and the Moorlands. A cairn lies immediately north of the hamlet. Notable residents have included rambler G. H. B. Ward.
