= Mary Gray (socialist) =

British socialist activist

Mary Gray (11 January 1854 – 1941) was a British socialist activist.

Born near Wokingham as Mary Rogers, she fell into poverty when she was fifteen. She found work as a domestic servant, and in 1876 married Willie Gray, a stonemason and trade unionist. Because of his trade union activity, Willie was often unable to find work, and the couple lived in hardship for some time.

In 1887, Gray joined the Social Democratic Federation (SDF). During the London dock strike of 1892, she ran a soup kitchen, and this contact with the children of the workers led her to found one of the first Socialist Sunday Schools, intending that they would provide a general education, in addition to informing them about socialism. The first session consisted of her own two children and one other, but the movement grew rapidly, and twenty years later there were 120 schools around the country.

During the 1890s, Edith Lanchester lodged with Gray. Gray was elected to the Battersea Board of Guardians in 1895, serving until 1901, and from 1896 until 1903, she was a member of the SDF's executive. She appears to have drifted away from the SDF soon after 1903, but remained in Battersea until the late 1930s, when she moved to Hampshire, and then Wiltshire, where she died in 1941.
