= Sheffield Clarion Ramblers =

Walking club

The Sheffield Clarion Ramblers was a rambling club founded by G. H. B. Ward in Sheffield in 1900. It was one of many clubs and societies inspired by the popular socialist newspaper, The Clarion. Its first ramble was in the Peak District around Edale on Sunday, 2 September 1900 with fourteen people from Sheffield. By the early 1920s the club were claiming to be the "largest and most influential Rambling Club in the British Isles".

== Membership ==
Membership of the club peaked at around two hundred in the post-war era of the 1940s but then dwindled to just eight when it disbanded in 2015. The composition of the club was mixed and encompassed members who were unemployed to others from clerical backgrounds. According to historian Ann Holt, the membership can be best characterised as being from "lower middle and upper-working classes, people frequently characterised by a certain earnestness and the taste for self-improvement of which Ward himself was an example." In 1910, Sheffield's first Labour MP Joseph Pointer became the club's president.

== Sheffield Clarion Handbooks ==
The club, between 1901 and 1964, produced annual handbooks in which the itinerary of the club's rambles would be produced alongside geology, toponymy and local history. Until 1906, the handbooks were prefaced with the caption "The Rambler who doth own the bond of fellowship" when it was replaced with the mottoes "A Rambler made is a man improved" and "The man who was never lost, never went far." The handbooks were used to espouse much of the culture and meaning that the Clarion Ramblers attributed to their rambling - for example, one section in the 1934 handbook talked of how

"Rambling is also a culture and a craft... (it is) an intense love for one's own country, the innermost and the most remote parts of it, the sweetest as well as the wildest, a love for the wind and the rain, the snow and the frost, the hill and the vale, the widest open spaces, and the choicest pastoral and arboreal retreats. It is a love for our valley and moorsides, their history and their lore, which cannot be exhausted, a love which, more than the physical side of enlisting good health and of preserving good health, compels a devotion and adoration which is equal to some men's religion."

An anthology of the content of the handbooks was published by Halsgrove in 2002 The Best of the Sheffield Clarion Ramblers' Handbooks: 'Ward's piece' ; edited by David Sissons (ISBN 9781841142227).

== Political activities ==
The Clarion Ramblers were highly involved with a multitude of local campaigns to gain rights of access over footpaths and commons around the Peak District as well as being involved in the nationwide campaign for an access to mountains bill Freedom to roam. The Sheffield Clarion Ramblers held their first trespass in 1907 on Bleaklow, over the summit of the Snake Pass. From 1921 the Clarion Ramblers held campaigned for the re-opening of the moorland route known locally as Doctor's Gate on the grounds it was historically a right of way. As part of their campaign they held an annual trespass over the route until access was won in 1927. From 1926 until the start of World War II the Clarion Ramblers, in conjunction with other groups, held an annual rally at Winnats Pass where they called for an Access to Mountains Bill to give a right to roam uncultivated upland.

== Influence ==
The Sheffield Clarion Ramblers were responsible for the formation of dozen of other rambling clubs in the Sheffield region including the Onward rambling club which was established by club members in reaction to what they saw as too much dawdling at the midday stops. The Clarion Ramblers also influenced the Tyneside Sunday Ramblers who, when formed in 1919, copied the club's motto "The man who never was lost never went very far.
