= Socialist Sunday School =

Political educational institutions

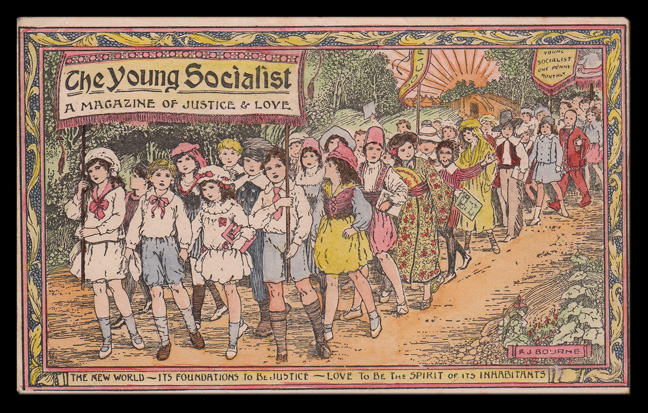
Promotional postcard advertising the monthly magazine of the Socialist Sunday School movement in Great Britain, The Young Socialist

Socialist Sunday Schools (SSS) were set up to replace or augment Christian Sunday Schools in the United Kingdom, and later the United States. They arose in response to the perceived inadequacy of orthodox Sunday schools as a training ground for the children of socialists and the need for an organised, systematic presentation of the socialist point of view to teach the ideals and principles of socialism to children and young people.

In the US, a Sunday School movement linked to the German-American socialist movement emerged in New York and Chicago in the 1880s and again on a broader scale as part of the Modern School Movement during the first decade of the 20th century. An even larger network of American Socialist Sunday Schools, closely paralleling the British movement, was launched by members of the Socialist Party of America during the first two decades of the 20th century.

== Socialist Sunday Schools in Great Britain ==
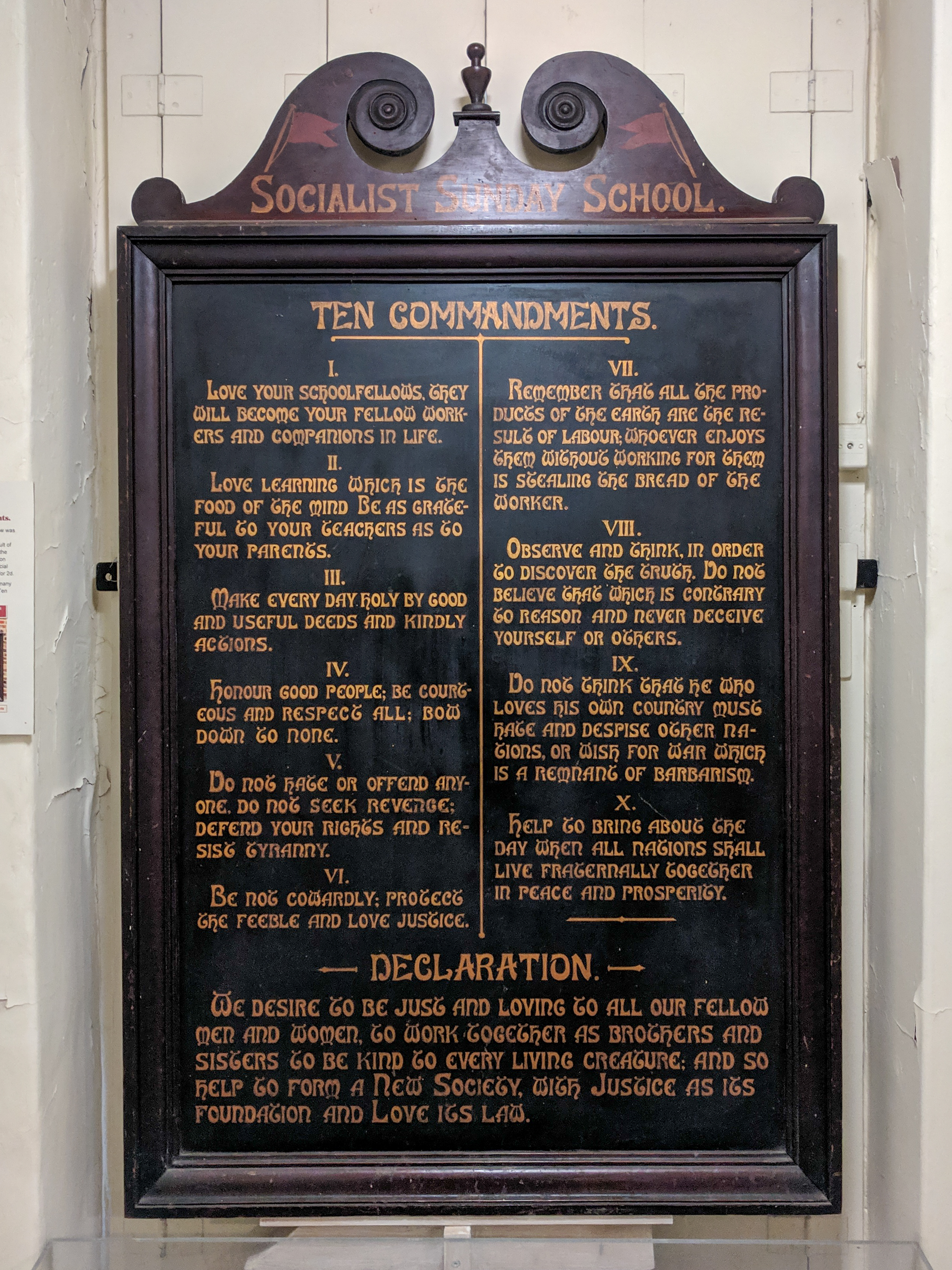
Ten Commandments and Declaration from a Socialist Sunday School in Walthamstow

=== History ===
The earliest use of secular Sunday Schools by the radical movement began in Great Britain in the early 1830s, when adherents of Robert Owen and Chartism opened Sunday training schools for their children. These schools continued to operate until the decade of the 1850s, fizzling out with the decline of the early radical movement.

For a generation, no such schools existed in Great Britain. Only in 1886 did Socialist Sunday Schools begin to reemerge in Great Britain. The institution was popularized by Mary Gray in 1892, a member of the Social Democratic Federation, who ran a soup kitchen for the children of the dock strike. Her aim, on realising the children had little or no education, was to influence and educate them and make them aware of their socialist responsibilities and provide what was lacking in their day schools. She started the first Sunday with only one other besides her own two children, but twenty years later there were approximately one hundred and twenty schools throughout the country, twenty of them in London itself.

In 1894, another Socialist Sunday School was created by trade unionist Tom Anderson. By 1912 there were over 200 Socialist Sunday Schools throughout Britain. In their early days they encountered opposition from local authorities and politicians, who argued that Socialist Sunday Schools subverted the minds of young people with political and anti-religious doctrines and teachings.

A national movement, the National Council of British Socialist Sunday Schools Union, formed in 1909, traces its origin to a school opened in Glasgow by Caroline Martyn and Archie McArthur, initiated by an 1895 letter to the Labour Leader by Lizzie Glasier. It was established as a protest against, and an alternative to, the perceived middle-class bias and assumptions of regular churches. Its aims were to help the schools in their teaching of socialism. A manual was prepared for the use of teachers. It contained sample lesson plans and teaching tips to help teachers, together with suggested readings for socialist education.

SSS leadership maintained that public education should be secular. Socialist Sunday Schools were purely educational. Their rituals and songs were free of religious content. They worked in close harmony with the Labour Movement and were concerned with the spiritual and social needs of the human race with regard to daily life and conduct.

Socialist Sunday Schools, along with the Labour Church, were hindered by a lack of their own meeting spaces. They met resistance in hiring suitable meeting halls to the extent that, in 1907, London County Council evicted five branches from hired school buildings. A massive demonstration in Trafalgar Square ensued, addressed by Margaret McMillan who, with her sister, was a Christian socialist who campaigned for better education and healthcare for poor children. The Springburn branch met for many years in the Labour Party's Unity Hall in Ayr Street for lack of another venue. In 1926, Fulham Council refused the SSS permission to meet on Sundays because it was of a 'non-theological' character. Socialist Sunday Schools encountered opposition because they were 'seen as subversive and as poisoning the minds of the young people of the country with their political and anti-religious doctrines and teachings' and there were those who tried to discredit the schools by accusations of blasphemy and revolutionary teachings.

=== Publications ===
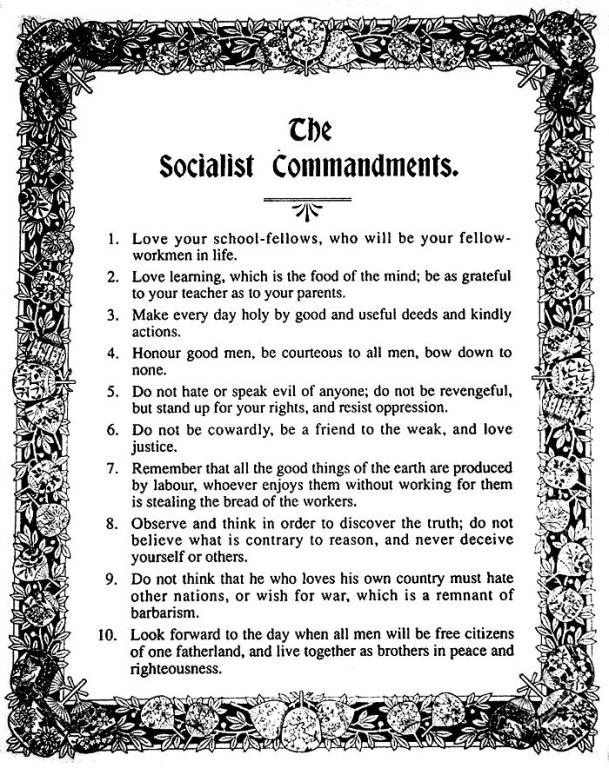
The Socialist Ten Commandments

The Young Socialist was a monthly periodical published by the National Council and was first issued in Glasgow in 1901. In the September 1910 edition the editor wrote that the true socialist, whatever his religious denomination, sought fellowship, a kingdom of love and happiness, not hell. The Socialist Sunday Schools were organised with this theory at its heart and although there was no formal set of rules to be followed, there were the guidelines of morality, brotherly love, and social obligation.

- That morality is the fulfillment of one's duty to one's neighbour.
- That the present social system is devoid of the elements of love or justice as it ignores the claims of the weak and distressed, and is, therefore, immoral;
- That society can be reorganised on a basis of love and justice, and that it is every man's duty to use all available social forces in bringing about that reorganisation.

There were also "Ten Commandments" to be followed which were printed in some of the editions of the hymn book.

1. Love your schoolfellows, who will be your fellow workmen in life.
2. Love learning, which is the food of the mind; be as grateful to your teacher as to your parents.
3. Make every day holy by good and useful deeds and kindly actions.
4. Honour good men, be courteous to all men, bow down to none.
5. Do not hate or speak evil of anyone. Do not be revengeful but stand up for your rights and resist oppression.
6. Do not be cowardly. Be a friend to the weak and love justice.
7. Remember that all good things of the earth are produced by labour. Whoever enjoys them without working for them is stealing the bread of the workers.
8. Observe and think in order to discover the truth. Do not believe what is contrary to reason and never deceive yourself or others.
9. Do not think that he who loves his own country must hate and despise other nations, or wish for war, which is a remnant of barbarism.
10. Look forward to the day when all men and women will be free citizens of one fatherland and live together as brothers and sisters in peace and righteousness.

== Socialist Sunday Schools in the United States ==
=== Origins ===
The earliest known Socialist Sunday School in the US was launched on March 1, 1880, in New York City by Branch 14 of the Socialist Labor Party of America. Some 30 students participated at the time of the school's launch, which was lauded in the daily New Yorker Volkszeitung as an institution of great benefit to the entire German working-class neighborhood on Manhattan's East Side. The female members of Branch 14 were instrumental in the financial support of the school, which over the next two years conducted a series of concerts, performances, and fundraising social events.

Other early American Socialist Sunday Schools were launched in Chicago during the last years of the 1880s. Four such schools were identified by police officials at the time and declared by the authorities to be of "Socialistic and Anarchistic origin". Classes were conducted in German — the main language of the immigrant-dominated American socialist movement of the day — and about 500 children are believed to have attended in all.

With the memory of the Haymarket Affair still fresh, these Sunday Schools were characterized by police official Michael J. Schaack as "the most conspicuous feature of the propaganda of the Internationale in Chicago today" and condemned for their "sowing in the minds of innocent children the seeds of atheism, discontent, and lawlessness."

One Chicago SSS, the North Side Sunday School, met each week for one hour of instruction by a member of the local Turn Verein, during which the ills of the capitalist system and the proposed alternative of socialism were expounded. An 1888 front-page story in the Chicago Tribune editorialized that under the slogan "no religion and no church" children were being subjected to "an inculcation of socialistic views at an age particularly impressionable." An annual summer picnic and outing was held by the school in conjunction with the Turn Verein, attended by several hundred children ranging in age from 3 to 16.

Socialist Sunday Schools also seem to have existed in a few other major metropolitan areas, including a SSS started in Philadelphia in the fall of 1888, with six teachers and about 150 pupils present for the launch.

Additional Sunday Schools linked to the organized anarchist movement sprouted up in various American urban centers during the first decade of the 1900s, springing primarily from the so-called Modern School movement developed by the Catalan anarchist Francisco Ferrer in 1901. The Modern Schools were intended to be both instruments for self-development and social change and taught the values of cooperation, sympathy for the downtrodden, collective solidarity, anti-militarism, anti-capitalism, and opposition to the power of the centralized state. About 22 such schools were established. Although originally intended to be expanded and transformed into regular day schools, most of these radical "Modern Schools" proved to be short-lived.

=== Schools of the Socialist Party of America ===
The Socialist Sunday School of Williamsbridge, Bronx, New York was organized in 1911 by Italian immigrants to provide an alternative to the Sunday Schools of the Roman Catholic Church.

The primary Socialist Sunday School movement in the United States was that connected with the country's largest socialist organization, the Socialist Party of America (SPA). Approximately 100 Socialist Sunday Schools were established by SPA during the first two decades of the 20th century. These institutions were intended to supplement the general education obtained by working class children in the publicly owned school system of the country. Socialist Sunday Schools of the SPA were organized in no fewer than 64 cities and towns spread across 20 states and the District of Columbia.

While schools associated with the Socialist Party were established in such Midwestern cities as Chicago and Omaha, Nebraska, the center of greatest activity was New York City and the neighboring cities of southern New Jersey. According to one scholar, the impetus for these schools came from the Workmen's Circle (Arbeiter Ring), a Yiddish language socialist fraternal benefit society. The publishers of the Socialist New Yorker Volkszeitung were quick to follow, launching a periodical to aid the effort in December 1908 called The Little Socialist Magazine for Boys and Girls. The name of the publication was changed to Young Socialists' Magazine in June 1911. By 1911 some 14 Socialist Sunday Schools were in existence in the New York metropolitan area.

The first Socialist Sunday School on the west coast was established in Oakland, California early in 1906. Coordinated by Socialist Party of California activist H.H. Lilienthal, more than 100 children were enrolled at the organization's January 28 launch, held at the headquarters facility of Local Oakland.

While precise enrollment numbers are not available, one contemporary estimated in the spring of 1911 that some 2,000 children participated in English language Socialist Sunday Schools, supplanted by others in schools for children who spoke German, Latvian, Yiddish, and other languages of the immigrant community.

Among the leaders of the Socialist Party's effort to develop Socialist Sunday Schools was Bertha Howell Mailly, for a time Secretary of the New York State Committee, who encouraged prospective SSS teachers to read John Dewey's School and Society to provide a conceptual basis for their work. During the second decade of the 20th century the Socialist Party's "Young People's Department", headed by William Kruse, published an organizing manual for party locals seeking to establish Socialist Sunday Schools, including an extensive proposed list of books for SSS libraries.

The Socialist education movement in America was closely connected with certain of the foreign language federations of the SPA, which taught children in their native tongue. Known to have organized Socialist Sunday Schools during this period were the Finnish Socialist Federation, the Ukrainian Socialist Federation, the Hungarian Socialist Federation, and the Lettish Socialist Federation.

In tandem with the Socialist Party of America's network of Sunday Schools there existed a system of Sunday Schools conducted by the Workmen's Circle (Arbeiter Ring), a predominantly Yiddish language socialist mutual benefit organization. Founded in 1892, the Workmen's Circle was reorganized in 1901 and had grown to a membership of 6,700 by 1905. By 1924 the Workmen's Circle was considerably larger than the declining Socialist Party, counting a membership of 85,000 in nearly 700 branches spread across 38 states and Canada.

The Workmen's Circle established an educational bureau of its own in 1908 and sponsored programs for both adults and children, including some specifically designated as "Socialist Sunday Schools". Some of these Workmen's Circle schools eventually allied themselves with the closely related network of Socialist Party schools, while others retained an independent affiliation with the Jewish socialist organization which had pioneered them.

=== Publications ===
The primary publication of the Socialist Party's youth movement was a monthly magazine called Young Socialist's Magazine, established in 1908. Although it would be incorrect to say that the activities of the British Socialist Sunday Schools were the sole influence upon the American movement, British publications and experiences were closely followed by American SSS activists. American SSS workers traveled to Britain to observe the activities of the thriving school movement there, and reported their findings upon their return.

== Socialist Schools in other countries ==
According to Kenneth Teitelbaum, a scholar of the socialist youth education movement, socialist schools for children also operated in Australia, Canada, New Zealand, Hungary, Belgium, and Switzerland.
