= Cowley, Derbyshire =

Hamlet in Derbyshire, England

Coordinates: 53.289°N 1.493°W

Cowley
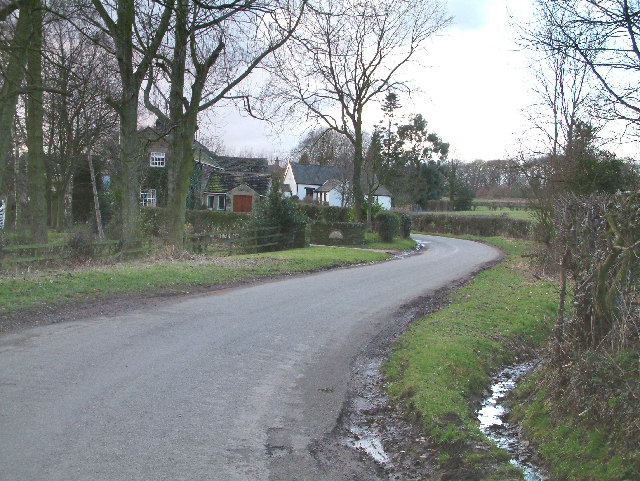
- The small village of Cowley, with the white-painted Mission in the distance.

- Location within Derbyshire
- OS grid reference: SK338770
- District: North East Derbyshire
- Shire county: Derbyshire
- Region: East Midlands
- Country: England
- Sovereign state: United Kingdom
- Post town: DRONFIELD
- Postcode district: S18
- Police: Derbyshire
- Fire: Derbyshire
- Ambulance: East Midlands

Cowley is a small dispersed hamlet in North East Derbyshire, consisting of a few private houses and functioning farms strung out along Cowley Lane, which runs between the village of Holmesfield and the "Hill Top" neighbourhood of the town of Dronfield (where the population is included). Until 2001 it held an annual well dressing in the grounds of Cowley Mission, a small chapel founded in 1888 and still active.

== History ==
Cowley is mentioned in the Domesday Book as belonging to Henry de Ferrers and being worth ten shillings. Henry was given a large number of manors in Derbyshire including Doveridge, Breaston, Duffield and Hartshorne.

The name Cowley has been described as coming from two Old English words, col for coal or earlier charcoal and leah for clearing, suggesting the charcoal burners' clearing. Coal (the Silkstone seam) is close to the surface in this area and has been worked for centuries, though no longer. Early coal workings would have been shallow, probably bell pits; the nearest, deeper shaft marked on the Ordnance Survey map is about 800 m north of Cowley at SK337778, on the edge of modern Dronfield.

== Amenities ==
Cowley has a small chapel founded in 1888, Cowley Mission, which is still active. Cowley also has a Riding school called Cowley Riding School.

== Notable buildings ==
In Cowley there is only one building listed by Historic England for its historical or architectural interests. There are no buildings listed as Grade I, however there is one as Grade II, Cowley Farmhouse, a 17th Century Farmhouse built of coursed rubble coal measures sandstone.
