= Julia Dawson =

British journalist, socialist, and editor (1866–1946)

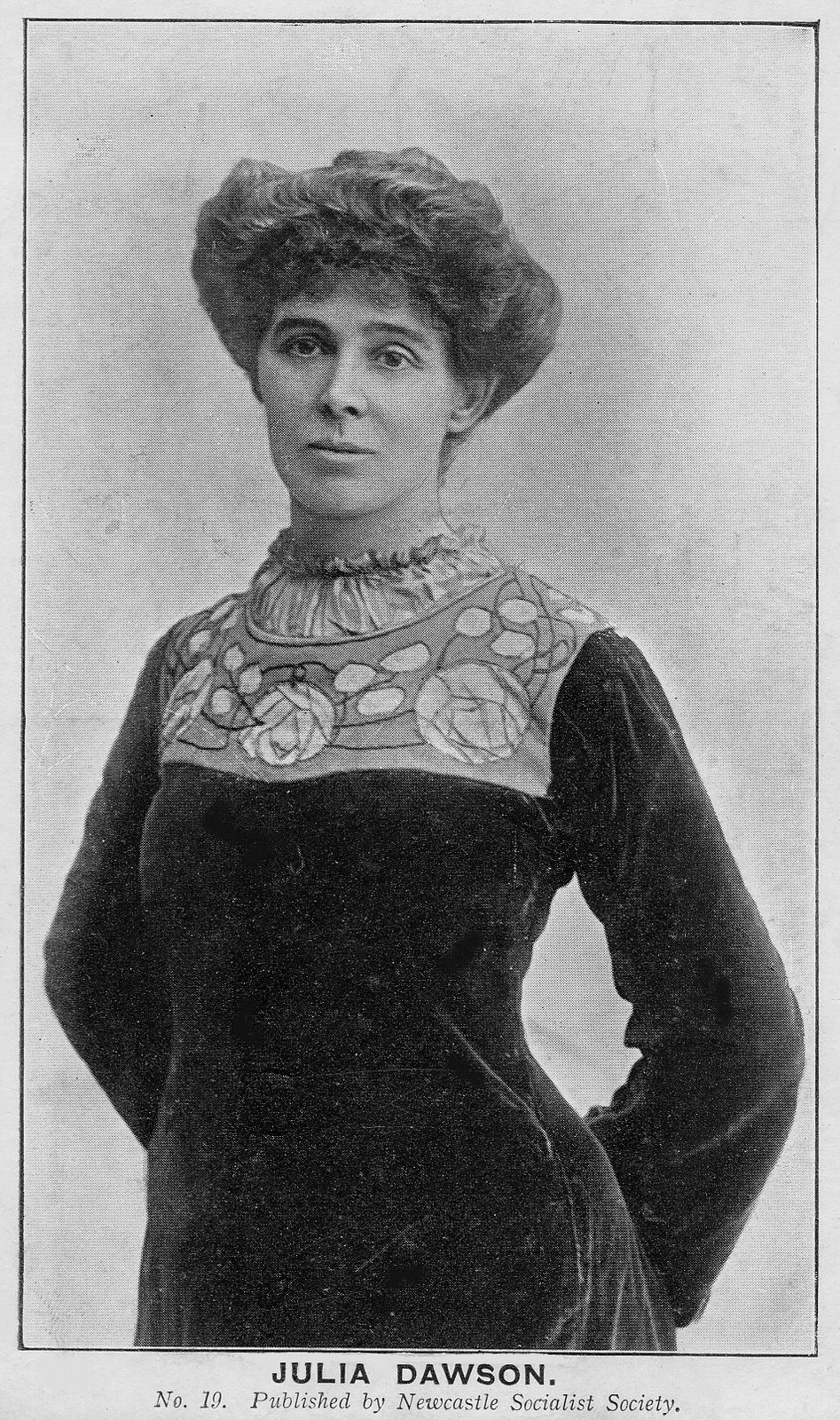
- Born: Dora Julia Dawson; 9 July 1866; Egerton, Kent
- Died: 3 October 1946 (aged 80); Shoreham-by-Sea, Sussex
- Other name: Dora Julia Myddleton Worrall
- Occupations: Socialist, journalist, editor
- Employer(s): The Clarion, The Woman Worker
- Notable work: 'Why Women Want Socialism' (1908)
- Movement: Socialist
- Spouse: Harry Myddleton Worrall (m. 1885)
- Children: 1

Dora Julia Myddleton Worrall (née Dawson; 9 July 1866 – 3 October 1946), known by her pen name Julia Dawson was a British journalist, socialist, and editor of the women's section of The Clarion. As an editor, she has been highlighted as an important example of women journalists turning the traditionally domestic 'Woman's Page' to feminist ends. She is notable for pioneering the use of the Clarion Van for spreading the ideas of socialism around Britain.

== Early life and marriage ==
Dora Julia Dawson was born in Egerton, Kent in 1866. She married Harry Myddleton Worrall, an export merchant, in 1885 and they had one daughter, Dorothy Mary Myddleton, born that year.

Dawson began her career as a journalist, writing for YWCA publications and she was a seasoned socialist activist before she was chosen to be the editor of The Clarion's women's column.

== Socialism ==
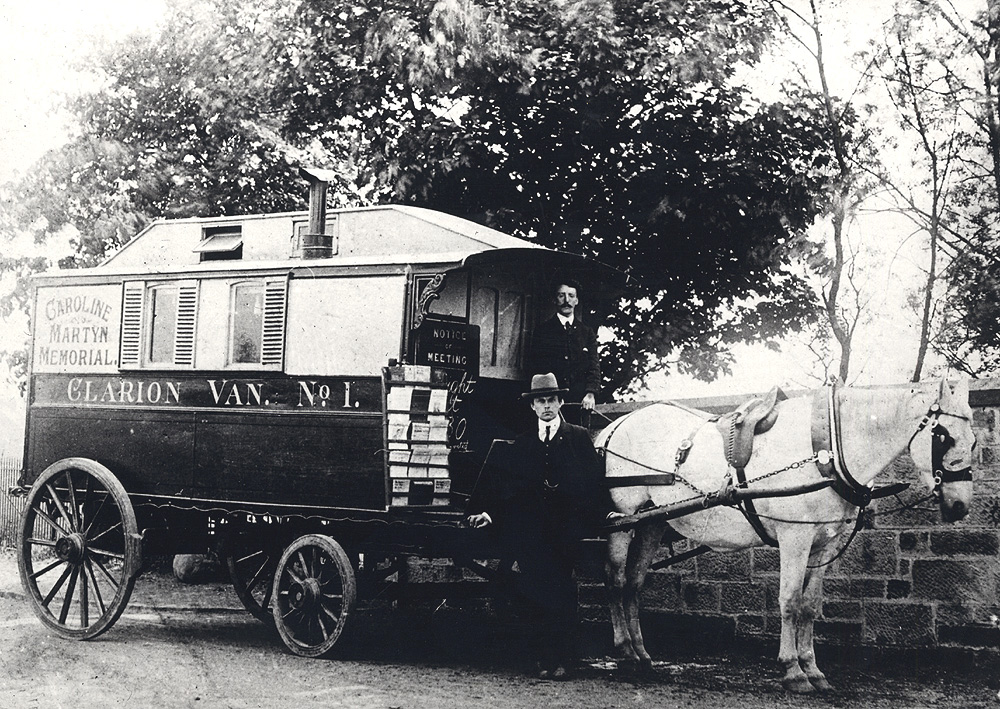
Clarion Van number One was named for Caroline Martyn

Dawson was editor of the women's section (called 'Our Woman's Letter') of socialist newspaper The Clarion between 1895 and 1911. From its early days, the paper had included a women's column written by Eleanor Keeling and subsequently by Dawson. As editor, Dawson's concerns have been described as "immediate and practical", including "hints about more efficient housekeeping, propaganda for rational dress, appeals to women to join their nearest ILP branch, and contacts for isolated readers". Dawson also supported the provision of information on birth control, distributing Malthusian tracts to Clarion readers. Barbara Green has argued that 'Our Woman's Letter' "not only recognized the significance of domestic routine, but also argued that socialism could enliven the private arena as well as the public sphere". Green notes that alongside other contributors to socialist papers, such as Rebecca West, in carving out a space for the voice of women in the political arena, Dawson helped make "the form of the woman's column anew". Other notable women contributors to the pages of the Clarion were Margaret McMillan and Enid Stacy.

It was in The Clarion's pages that, in February 1896, Dawson announced her idea to organise a Clarion Van tour and appealed for donations. The van would be horse-drawn and, carrying two to three women, travel the country to distribute socialist literature. Open-air meetings would be held and addressed by socialist speakers. Following a good response to the appeal, the van set off on 18 June 1896, travelling from Chester through Shropshire, Cheshire, Manchester, Stockport, Yorkshire, Durham, and Northumberland. Among the speakers invited to the first tour were trade unionist Caroline Martyn (after whom the first Clarion Van was named), suffragist Ada Nield, and suffragette and trade unionist Sarah Reddish. Over the course of a fifteen-week tour, the women addressed thousands of people, and it was judged a resounding success—repeated annually. In later years, donors would include Alfred Russel Wallace. By 1907, there were six vans.

In 1901, Clarion editor Robert Blatchford wrote:

Now I think a few words of thanks are due to my friend—our friend—Julia Dawson. Nobody knows how hard Julia has worked for these Vans. She started the idea. She got the money. She got the Vans. She arranged the tours. All the worry and all the work have fallen to her, and she has gone through it splendidly and without a single murmur. Now the Vans are an established institution, and there is no doubt that they are doing very fine work. And we owe all that to the talent, industry, self-sacrifice, and unwearied good humour of Julia Dawson.

In the same editorial, Blatchford highlighted Dawson's significant role in managing the Cinderella Clubs (of which she was the first National Secretary), which aimed to provide food and entertainment to children in poverty. She was also pioneering in the Clarion Handicraft Guild, which she established in 1902. Dawson had been inspired by a letter from Godfrey Blount who enthused about the ideas of William Morris. Blount had himself founded The Peasant Arts Society. The handicraft clubs were very successful although the quality varied considerably. The members would discuss their work via the newspaper and in 1904 there was an exhibition where 30 clubs exhibited.

In 1908, Dawson published her pamphlet Why Women Want Socialism. Hannam argued that "under socialism every woman and child would be looked after by the State. The removal of poverty would alter relationships within the family and transform the quality of domestic life".

== Death and legacy ==
Julia Dawson died at her home in Shoreham, Sussex on 3 October 1946. The Daily Herald described her as "one of the bright spirits of the earlier days of Socialism in Britain".
