= Association for the Urban Mobility on Bicycle =

Portuguese cyclists' organization

Association for Urban Mobility on Bicycle MUBi
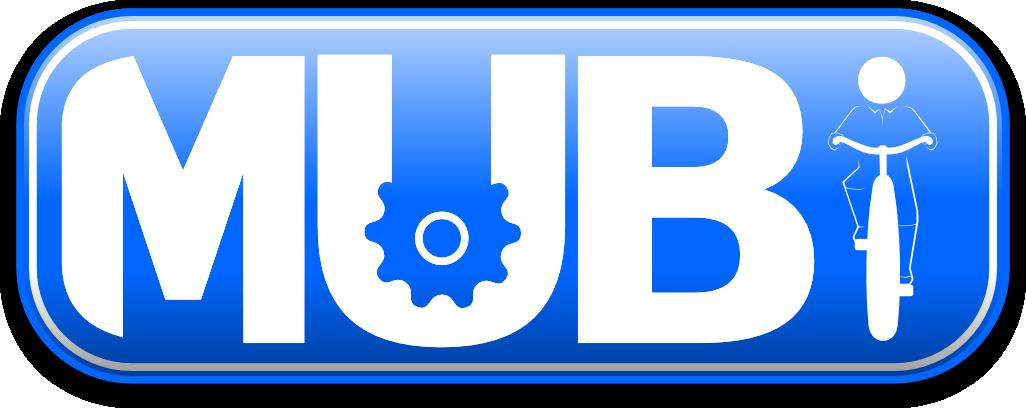
- Formation: 2009
- Type: NGO
- Purpose: "More people cycling, more often"
- Location: Lisbon, Portugal
- Website: http://mubi.pt/en

The Association for Urban Mobility on Bicycle (in Portuguese Associação pela Mobilidade Urbana em Bicicleta, known by its acronym MUBi) is a Portuguese cyclists association that aims to promote the bicycle and other active means of transportation in urban areas, as well as sustainable mobility. MUBi was legally established on the 22nd of June, 2009. It has influenced and worked with the parliamentarians for the revision of the traffic code in Portugal that took place in 2013, in order to make it more respectful to more vulnerable road users, such as pedestrians and cyclists. MUBi has also kickstarted a movement called "Friday by Bike" (Sexta de Bicicleta, in Portuguese), with the goal to encourage new users to use the bicycle at least once per week on their daily errands.

MUBi is also a full member of the European Cyclists' Federation and also supports the Critical Mass cycling event.
