= Ixion Bicycle Club =

Ixion Bicycle Club was an organization which was incorporated in New York on September 28, 1885. Beginning in 1881 the group held an annual race which started from Peabody House in Yonkers, New York. The event finished at 59th Street (Manhattan) and Western Boulevard in New York City.

In 1883 the Ixion Bicycle Club had nine members and its president was B.G. Sandford. Members wore black and blue colors, suits which were made of serge. In the summer the Ixion clubmen wore a blue cap.

Forty-eight cyclists, formerly members of the Ixion Bicycle Club, were elected members of the New York Bicycle Club in June 1887.
