= G. H. B. Ward =

British politician (1876–1957)

George Herbert Bridges Ward, known as G. H. B. Ward or Bert Ward (1876 – 14 October 1957) was an activist for walkers' rights and a Labour Party politician.

== Political activism ==
Born in central Sheffield, Ward worked as an engineer in a local steelworks. Whilst working in this capacity, Ward became the first Secretary of the Sheffield Labour Representation Committee, on which he represented the Amalgamated Society of Engineers, later becoming Chair. A major political interest was his campaign against infant mortality, calling for increased supervision of midwives and the milk supply and for education of mothers.

In 1900, Ward travelled to the Canary Islands with the money he had received from an inheritance and subsequently taught himself Spanish. During this period Ward befriended two Spanish politicians Fernando Tarrida del Mármol and Francisco Ferrer Guardia. After the execution of Francisco Ferrer Guardia in 1909 on false charges, Ward wrote a book The Truth About Spain (1911) criticising anti-democratic forces in Spain.

Late in life, Ward began working at the Ministry of Labour, and retired in 1941 to his house at Owler Bar.

== Sheffield Clarion Ramblers ==
In September 1900, he founded the Sheffield Clarion Ramblers, recognised as the first working class rambling club, with a walk around Kinder Scout. The club was named for The Clarion socialist newspaper in which the advert for this walk was placed. In the 1921 Clarion Handbook, Ward described the club's first walk and its consequences;

"The Club was born on the first Sunday in September 1900. Kinder Scout footpath was opened during the previous year, it occurred to me that others might wish to accompany me, and I advertised in the Clarion. The day was fine and clear, and fourteen attended [eleven men and three women]... En route it was decided that I should organise some ramblers during 1901 and we had five monthly walks... During 1901 it was decided that we must have an official existence and a Committee was formed."

The Clarion Rambling Club became the chief organisation campaigning for public access to the moorland areas of the Dark Peak. As early as 1907, Ward participated in an illegal mass trespass of Bleaklow, but did not participate in the 1932 Mass trespass of Kinder Scout as the Clarion Ramblers refused in advance to support the trespass.

In 1902, Ward produced the first edition of the Sheffield Clarion Ramblers Club Handbook which was then a four-page card with the details of nine summer rambles accompanied by one poem. The handbooks would continue for another 63 issues and proliferate in size with sections ranging from history and lore of the Peak District to sections on Toponymy and Geology. He successfully campaigned for the Ordnance Survey to amend some place names, and was involved in founding the Hunter Archaeological Society. He also revised John Derry's Across the Derbyshire Moors.

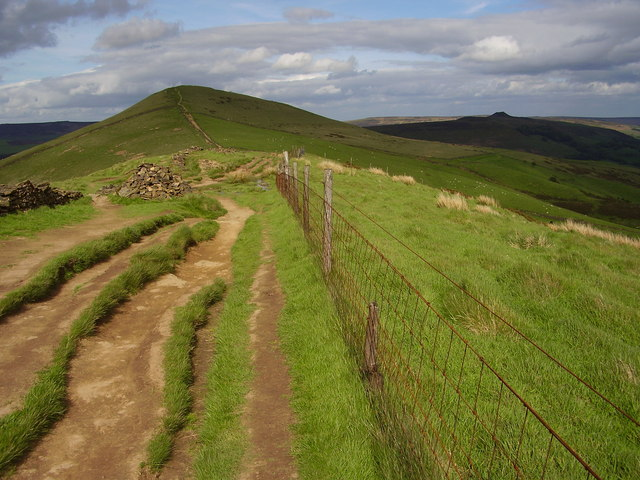
Ward's Piece

In 1912, Ward formed the Hallamshire Footpath Preservation Society, and in 1926 he founded the Sheffield and District Federation, a founding branch of the Ramblers Association. An area of Lose Hill, in the Peak District, was given to him by the Association in 1945 and named "Ward's Piece"; he subsequently presented this to the National Trust. Ward also worked on the 1933 purchase of the Longshaw Estate and was a founder member of the local Youth Hostel Association.

In 1957, the University of Sheffield gave Ward an honorary degree of Master of Arts for his accomplishments in improving access for walkers. Ward chaired the Sheffield Clarion Ramblers until his death later in the year.

== See also ==
- GeoWizard
