= Merrie England (Blatchford book) =

- Author: "Nunquam", pseudonym of Robert Blatchford
- Publication date: 1893

Merrie England is an influential collection of essays on socialism by Robert Blatchford under the pseudonym "Nunquam", published in 1893. The first issue by Nunquam was priced at one shilling. It sold over two million copies worldwide.

According to Gregory Claeys, "it was said that 'for every convert made by Das Kapital there were a hundred made by Merrie England'; the actual ratio was probably nearer one to a thousand."

The book received rebuttals including:

- R. Nemo, Labour and Luxury: A Reply to 'Merrie England' London: Walter Scott, 1895
- Robert Roberts, England's Ruin, Or John Smith's Answer to Mr. Blatchford's Plea for Socialism 1895
