= Archie McArthur =

English rugby union player

- Born: Archie McArthur; 11 June 2003 (age 23) Reading, Berkshire, England
- Height: 1.88 m (6 ft 2 in)
- Weight: 115 kg (18 st 2 lb)
- School: City of Oxford College

Rugby union career
- Position: Loosehead Prop
- Current team: Exeter Chiefs
Senior career
Years	Team	Apps	(Points)
2021–2022	Wasps	3	(0)
2022	→ Ampthill (loan)	2	(0)
2022–2026	Gloucester	21	(0)
2023–2024	→ Doncaster Knights (loan)	2	(0)
2023–2026	→ Hartpury University (loan)	27	(10)
2026–	→ Exeter Chiefs	0	(0)
- Correct as of 21 February 2026
International career
Years	Team	Apps	(Points)
2021–2022	England U18s	0	(0)
2022–2023	England U20s	12	(0)
- Correct as of 9 July 2023

Archie McArthur (born 11 June 2003) is an English professional rugby union player who plays as a prop for PREM Rugby club Exeter Chiefs.

== Career ==
McArthur joined the Wasps academy through their partnership with City of Oxford College, where he previously studied. On 17 October 2022, Wasps entered administration due to financial problems, resulting in the termination of contracts for their players and coaches alike. Instead, McArthur was signed by Premiership rivals Gloucester for the 2022–23 season with immediate effect.

McArthur represented England U18 and then made his debut for England U20 against Wales during the 2022 Six Nations Under 20s Championship. The following year saw him play in every round of the 2023 Junior Six Nations. McArthur was also a member of the England squad at the 2023 World Rugby U20 Championship and started in their semi-final elimination against France.

McArthur made his debut for Gloucester, winning against Bristol Bears 38-31 during the 2022–23 Premiership Rugby Cup competition. He was also loaned out to Championship clubs such as Doncaster Knights and Hartpury University for game-time and further development.

On 18 June 2025, it was confirmed that McArthur would be promoted to the senior squad of Gloucester ahead of the 2025–26 season. At the end of that campaign it was announced in July 2026 that he would leave to join Exeter Chiefs.
