= Caroline Martyn =

English trade unionist

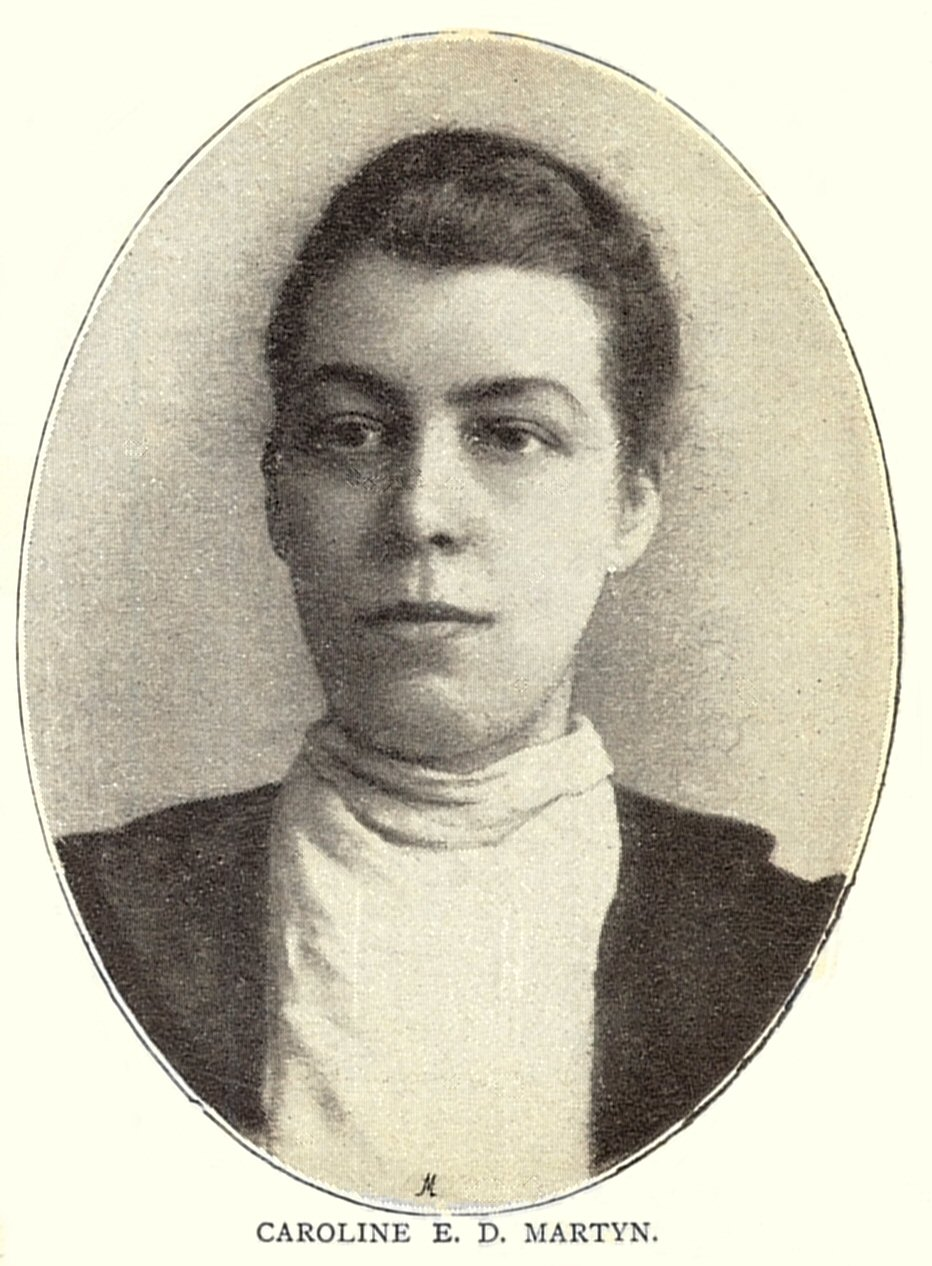
- Born: Caroline Eliza Derecourt Martyn; 3 May 1867; Lincoln, England
- Died: 23 July 1896 (aged 29); Dundee, Scotland
- Other name: Carrie Martyn
- Occupations: Activist; governess; trade union organiser
- Political party: Independent Labour Party
- Movement: Christian socialism

Caroline Eliza Derecourt Martyn (3 May 1867 – 23 July 1896), sometimes known as Carrie Martyn, was an English Christian socialist and an early organiser of trade unions in the United Kingdom.

== Early life ==
Martyn was born in Lincoln, the eldest child of Superintendent James William Martyn, who later became Deputy Chief Constable of Lincolnshire, and his wife Kate Eleanor (née Hewitt). Her parents were devout high Anglicans and active in the Conservative Party. She was educated at Beaumont House School in the city and at the age of eighteen began work as a governess.

Keir Hardie wrote that she was the leading socialist of her day.

== Political development ==
Martyn first joined the Conservative Primrose League, but while working in Reading she lodged with her maternal aunt, Mrs Bailey, who held pronounced left-wing views. She briefly became a radical and then a socialist. In 1891, she was appointed a governess at the Royal Orphanage Asylum in Wandsworth, London, and joined the London Fabian Society. The following year, ill-health forced her to give up work and she began to devote herself full-time to the socialist cause. However, this was tempered by the devout religious views she had inherited from her parents, and she strongly disagreed with the Marxist principles of many of her contemporaries. For a while, in 1893, she was a subeditor on the Christian Weekly.

== Suffrage and women's rights ==
In August 1894 the suffragist newspaper The Woman's Signal reported Martyn as having given an address on "'The Position of Women,'" in which she "advocated the rearing and education of children of both sexes on equal terms, and said that while girls and women were bound to domestic duties ... there was little hope for their intellectual advancement and their being placed on an equal footing with man."

Although she had many articles published in journals, Martyn was predominantly known as a lecturer. She became nationally recognised and large crowds turned up to hear her speak as she travelled round the country. In 1896, she was elected to the National Administrative Council of the Independent Labour Party and became editor of Fraternity, the journal of the International Society for the Brotherhood of Man, and ILP trades union organiser for the north of Scotland. Martyn worked as a socialist education leader with Archie McArthur which led to Tom Anderson's initiative to start, what became a national organisation of Socialist Sunday Schools, modelled on Christian church Sunday schools for children, but where they taught instead the principles of socialism, and offered formal educational material and lesson plans for teachers to use. They had ten commandments, 'hymns' or songs, an ethical 'lesson' and aspirational poetry.

== Personal life ==
Martyn did not marry, and noted that, "I count my escape from marriage as one of my greatest blessings, but for that I could never have done my work; probably could never have opened my eyes to see that it needed to be done."

Although she habitually dressed plainly, she cut a distinctive figure in the long black cloak which she wore while travelling, which was apt to draw "many curious eyes".

== Death and memorial ==
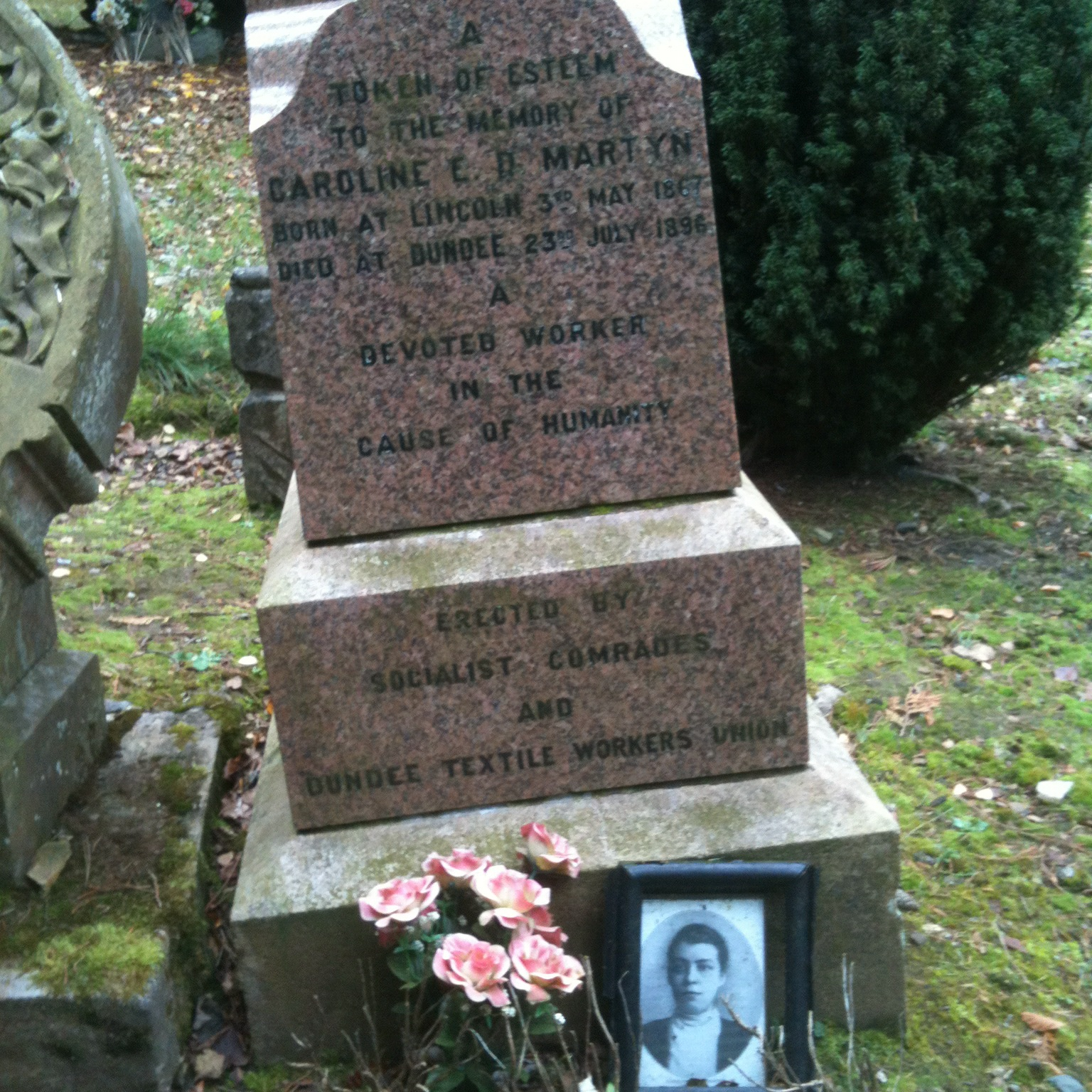
Martyn's memorial stone in Balgay Cemetery, Dundee

In July 1896, Martyn travelled to Dundee to speak to female workers, to encourage them to join the Dundee Textile Workers Union. Her work and travel, however, had undermined her already-fragile health, and she contracted pneumonia while in Dundee. She died on 23 July 1896 at the age of 29. Her mother had travelled from Lincoln to be at her bedside, and her family purchased a plot in Balgay Cemetery in the city, where she was buried 24 hours later. Ceremonies were held at St Paul's Episcopal Church and at the graveside, and wreaths were placed at her grave by Emily Thomson and Ethel Moorhead, Edwin Scrymgeour and the local branch of the Independent Labour Party.

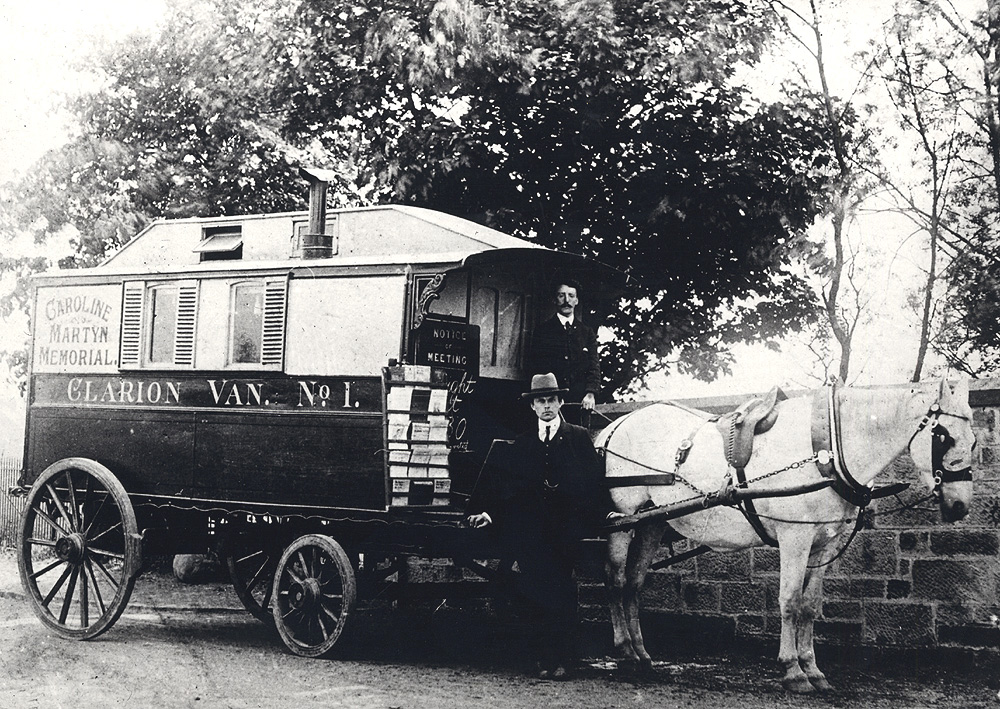
Julia Dawson's Clarion Van number One was named for Caroline Martyn

The Dundee branch of the Independent Labour Party and the Dundee Textile Workers' Union collected subscriptions for a memorial to be placed at her grave. The inscription reads: "A token of esteem to the memory of Caroline E D Martyn, born at Lincoln 3rd May 1867, died at Dundee 23rd July 1896. A devoted worker in the cause of humanity. Erected by Socialist comrades and Dundee Textile Workers Union."

Julia Dawson, a journalist based in Manchester, created Clarion Vans to travel around the country carrying the socialist message to women. The first van was named after Martyn who had died earlier that year.

By 2010, the memorial had fallen into disrepair. It was discovered by Mike Arnott (later to become the president of the STUC) and, at the instigation of Dundee Trades Council, the grave was tidied and the granite column restored. A service of commemoration was held at the graveside, followed by a civic reception in Dundee City Chambers. Among the guests were Dundee Provost John Letford and Martyn's great niece, Vivienne Flowers. The ceremony closed with a rendition of the Jute Mill Song by Mary Brooksbank.
