= Robert Blatchford =

English socialist campaigner and journalist

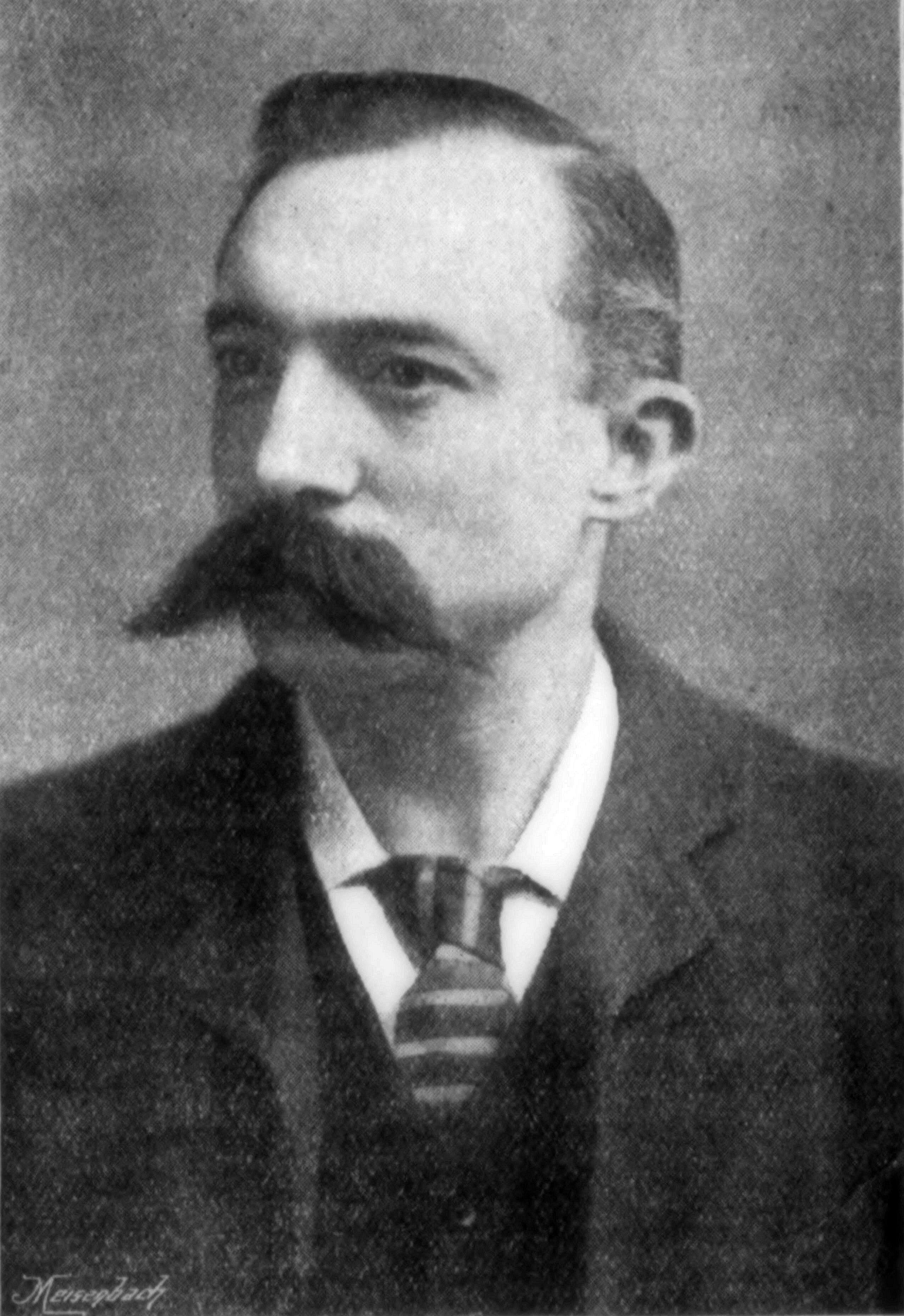
- Robert Blatchford in 1895
- Born: Robert Peel Glanville Blatchford; 17 March 1851; Maidstone, England
- Died: 17 December 1943 (aged 92); Horsham, England
- Occupations: Socialist campaigner, journalist
- Spouse: Sarah Crossley (m. 1880; died 1921)
- Family: Winifred Blatchford, daughter

Robert Peel Glanville Blatchford (17 March 1851 – 17 December 1943) was an English socialist campaigner, journalist, and author in the United Kingdom. He was also noted as a prominent atheist, nationalist, and opponent of eugenics. In the early 1920s, after the death of his wife, he turned towards spiritualism.

== Early life ==
Blatchford was born 17 March 1851 in Maidstone, Kent. His parents, John Glanville Blatchford, a strolling comedian, and Georgina Louisa nee Corri 1821–1890), an actress – named him after the Conservative Prime Minister Robert Peel who died the year before. His maternal great-grandfather, Domenico Corri, (1746–1825), was an Italian musician and publisher who, in the late 18th century, moved from Rome to Edinburgh to teach music. One of his grandnieces, Christine Glanville (1924–1999), was an acclaimed English puppeteer.

Blatchford's father died in 1853, leaving him in the care of his mother. She continued her acting career for nine years, and Blatchford spent much of his early life close to the stage. To help support the family, Blatchford and his brother Montagu would perform with their mother, doing comedic renditions and dances for extra income. In 1862 the family moved to Halifax, where it was hoped that Blatchford and his brother could learn a trade. Blatchford was first employed as an odd job boy in a lithographic printing works, for which he earned a salary of eighteen pence a week. As a child he attended school only occasionally, firstly in Halifax and later in Portsmouth. In spite of the brevity of his educational experience, he called the education system a "cram" method.

Though lacking a formal education, Blatchford taught himself from the age of eight, reading the Bible, Pilgrim's Progress, and the works of Charles Dickens. Throughout his childhood he was frail and sickly, and doctors suggested that he would not reach adulthood. This illness gave Blatchford time to read, something he would not have been able to pursue as thoroughly if employed. Around 1864, Georgina secured full-time employment as a dressmaker and immediately apprenticed both her sons, sending Montagu to a lithographic printer and Robert to a brush maker. At the brush maker factory, Blatchford met Sarah Crossley, whom he would marry in 1880.

By 1871 Blatchford left Halifax, though his reason for doing so has been the cause of debate. Laurence Thompson argues that the departure was due to a quarrel with his mother, but Blatchford's daughter Dorothea maintains that his decision to leave was caused by the difficulty of his life in Halifax. On May Day 1871, Blatchford walked to Hull, then continued on to London via Yarmouth.

== Military and early journalistic career ==
After leaving Halifax, Blatchford joined the Army and rose to become a sergeant major by 1874. By the time of his promotion, he had also achieved the Army's second class certificate of education. Blatchford served with the Irish regiment 103rd Dublin Fusiliers and the 96th Regiment of Foot. The pleasures of army life stimulated some of Blatchford's best writing, but in 1877 he left the army to become a clerk in the Weaver Navigation Company. While employed as a clerk, he carefully used his spare time to learn grammar, syntax, and shorthand. In 1880 he married Sarah Crossley, whom he had met in Halifax, at the Zion Chapel. They then settled in Norwich. Sarah was the daughter of a domestic worker and a mechanic. Around this time Blatchford became frustrated with his job and decided that he wished to become an artist. Because employment opportunities for artists in Norwich were scarce, however, he instead decided to become a writer. Blatchford's writing career began in 1882 at the Yorkshireman newspaper, where he had a sketch published. He obtained his first full-time writing job through his friend Alexander Muttock Thompson, who worked for the Manchester Sporting Chronicle. Thompson recommended Blatchford to a friend who ran the newspaper Bell's Life in London. A year later, Blatchford moved his family to South London to write for Bell's Life and the Leeds Toby.

In 1885, Blatchford began to write for the Manchester Sunday Chronicle. When Bell's Life failed two years later, he moved to a full-time position at the Sunday Chronicle. Before beginning at the Sunday Chronicle, Blatchford took a short holiday on the Isle of Wight after the death of his two children. At this time he had not begun to espouse socialist views, but the societal reactions to the competitiveness of industrial society in Northern England began affecting his sentiments. The largest political influence on Blatchford was the South Salford Social Democratic Federation. This change is seen in a series of 1889 articles he wrote for the Sunday Chronicle which denounced the housing conditions in Manchester and organised two working men's Sanitary Organisations in the area.

Reflecting back on this period, Blatchford stated in the Fortnightly Review in 1907 that "Dr. Cozier is mistaken if he thinks I took my Socialism from Marx, or that it depends upon the Marxian theory of value. I have never read a page of Marx. I got the idea of collective ownership from H. M. Hyndman; the rest of my Socialism I thought out myself. English Socialism is not German: it is English. English Socialism is not Marxian; it is humanitarian. It does not depend upon any theory of 'economic justice' but upon humanity and common sense."

== The Clarion ==
In 1890, while based in Manchester, Blatchford became actively involved in the Labour Movement. He founded the Manchester branch of the Fabian Society, and launched a weekly socialist newspaper, The Clarion, in 1891. Later that year, he used his column to announce that he had accepted the invitation of the Bradford Labour Union to become the Independent Labour candidate in Bradford East. However, his socialist stance forced him to leave the Sunday Chronicle, which in turn left him with a severe reduction in income.

Having left the newspaper on 12 December 1891, Blatchford set up The Clarion, but a printing error made its first edition almost completely illegible. Nevertheless, it still sold at least 40,000 copies. It continued to sell this number and more during the following years. By 1910 it was selling about 80,000 copies of each issue. Bernard Semmel described it as "the most successful socialist publication in Great Britain during the period before the war of 1914".

By 1892 Blatchford had removed himself from the candidature in Bradford East and began siding with the Social Democratic Federation (SDF) against the Fabians' policy of "permeation." The joining of The Clarion and SDF resulted in the formation in 1892 of the Manchester Independent Labour Party, which soon devised the Manchester Fourth Clause. By 1893 Blatchford was the leader of his own clique within the newly founded national Independent Labour Party, the Clarionettes, whose extraordinary dynamism was expressed in its numerous choral societies, Clarion cycling clubs, Socialist Scouts, and Glee clubs.

Central to the Clarion movement were the Clarion cycling clubs, whose members, frequently accompanied by the "Clarion Van", travelled the country distributing socialist literature and holding mass meetings. Robert Tressell's socialist novel The Ragged Trousered Philanthropists contains a detailed account based on a meeting organised by the Clarion scouts.

The Clarion movement also supported many industrial disputes at this time, including the three-year lockout of the slateworkers of the Penrhyn slate quarry in North Wales. The Clarion collected £1,500 to support the people of Bethesda.

There was a revolt in the county federation created by the ILP in 1894, as Blatchford urged the formation of a united socialist party. In the same year he resigned from the editorship of The Clarion due to ill health and developed depression. He started to edit it again in 1896. He supported the Boer War, which lost him support from some sections of the labour movement. Blatchford denounced his "cosmopolitan friends, who are so cosmopolitan that they can admire every country but their own, and love all men except Englishmen". He criticised the "smug, self-righteous prigs" in the labour movement who, while "despising military glory, are yet so eloquent over the marksmanship and courage of the Boers". He wrote that his "whole heart is with the British troops ... When England is at war, I'm English. I have no politics and no party. I am English." Responding to claims from the right-wing press that he wanted to ‘turn people against their country’, he retorted that he wanted ‘to make people so fond of their country that they shall desire to possess it’.

After the war Blatchford continued to agitate for a united socialist party and supported the London Progressive Party. He was critical of the Labour Party, which was founded in 1900, for what he perceived as its complete subservience to Liberalism, especially in its Cobdenite internationalist views on foreign policy. Blatchford said of himself and his colleagues at The Clarion: "We were out for Socialism and nothing but Socialism, and we were Britons first and Socialists next."

Blatchford criticised free trade from an economic nationalist perspective. Free trade had made it impossible for Britain to feed herself and had destroyed British agriculture. This was especially serious in wartime because Britain could be starved into submission due to the dependence for her food on foreign nations. When Joseph Chamberlain launched his crusade for Tariff Reform in 1903, Blatchford's response was ambiguous. He did not formally endorse Chamberlain's campaign, but The Clarion praised his aims—the revival of British agriculture, a self-sufficient Empire, and producer-focused instead of consumer-focused economic system. Blatchford said he did not believe in tariff reform as applied by Conservatives, but that a socialist government would find it a necessary instrument.

A further development in Blatchford's thinking cost him further readers, when he began denouncing organised religion in such works as God and My Neighbour (1903) and Not Guilty: A Defence of the Bottom Dog (1905). Again, to antagonise the ILP, the Clarion raised funds for Victor Grayson, whom the ILP had declined to support. He justified his attacks as being because Labour was too close to the Liberals.

== Merrie England ==
A series of articles on socialism in The Clarion were published in book form in 1893 as Merrie England. The first edition sold 30,000 copies. The year after, a pocket-sized edition was published, which sold 25,000 copies. A penny edition was published in 1894, with 250,000 copies being ordered before publication and within a year 750,000 copies had been despatched across the English speaking world. In Britain and America, the book sold over two million copies. In the opinion of Robert Ensor, the book "helped to make socialism really well known in England for the first time...It was Blatchford's highest flight as a propagandist; he never surpassed it, and through it mainly he left his mark upon history". The book was translated into Welsh, Hebrew, Dutch, Italian, Spanish and German.

William Thomas Stead picked the book as the Review of Reviews book of the month and called Blatchford "the poor man's Plato". Dr Horton the Congregationalist minister compared Blatchford to Isaiah, Amos and Micah and said that "if Jesus Christ were a man on earth today, He would read the book not only with interest but with approval, and He would say to any officious disciples who took exception to parts of it, “Forbid him not; he that is not against Me is for Me"." C. P. Scott of the Manchester Guardian wrote to Blatchford, saying: "I have been reading Merrie England and (pace the reviewers) find a great deal in it!" The Manchester Guardian said that for every British convert to socialism made by Das Kapital there were a hundred made by Merrie England.

At the Oxford Union a motion was approved by 103 to 54 that stated that "the aims of the Socialist tract, Merrie England, are but the baseless fabric of a vision". The motion was seconded by Hilaire Belloc.

Blatchford was a vegetarian and in Merrie England he mentioned the economic, health and humanitarian benefits of a vegetarian diet.

== War scare of 1909 ==
At the end of the second week of December 1909, Blatchford wrote ten daily articles for the Daily Mail warning of the German menace:

I write these articles because I believe that Germany is deliberately preparing to destroy the British Empire; and because I know that we are not ready or able to defend ourselves against a sudden and formidable attack...At the present moment the whole country is in a ferment about the Budget and the Peers and the Election. It seems sheer criminal lunacy to waste time and strength in chasing such political bubble when the existence of the Empire is threatened.

The articles received considerable attention in Britain and Germany, and when published as a pamphlet sold over one and a half million copies. The King "lamented Blatchford's violence" and the Kaiser read Blatchford's articles with care and denounced them as "very mischievous and singularly ill-timed". Sir Charles Ottley, the Secretary to the Committee of Imperial Defence, wrote to Lord Esher that Blatchford's appeal was not based on a partisan, political basis as he had said that the country did not want a Liberal or Unionist government but a MAN: "His strength is that he knows what he wants and is not afraid to ask for it in plain language...The burthen of the song is—compulsory service, a strong navy and a general raising of the standard of education and living of the masses of the British people". Lord Cromer publicly declared that he shared Blatchford's patriotism. The articles ensured that defence was a major issue in the ensuing general election of January 1910. After the election the Liberal MP Reginald McKenna boasted that Blatchford had not cost the Liberals a single vote. Keir Hardie said that "the whole Socialist movement was rocking with suppressed laughter".

The Daily Mail′s Berlin correspondent told Lord Northcliffe: "In a long experience...I do not recall a foreign journalistic event which so focused the attention of the German press and public". There was universal condemnation in German newspapers, including Social Democratic, Catholic and Pan-German organs. When the German Chancellor Theobald von Bethmann Hollweg complained to Edward Goschen, the British ambassador in Berlin, the Foreign Secretary Sir Edward Grey advised Goschen to explain the articles as "not really anti-German but alarmist...to create a scare".

Shortly before the general election of December 1910, the Daily Mail published Blatchford's series of articles on ‘The Greatest Issue of All’, the German threat. However these were nowhere near as influential as his previous ones and defence was not an issue in the election.

In 1909 he began advocating conscription but in 1912 troops were used for strike breaking and Blatchford turned against it: "Universal military service under the (present) ruling classes would result in slavery. I regard invasion as the lesser evil". However, he supported conscription again in 1915 and proclaimed it should be implemented along with the "conscription of wealth". Before the war, Blatchford toured Germany and after he returned to England he wrote:

I am convinced that...they will be plunged into war without their will. I like Germany; I like German cities; and I like the German people. But I believe that the rulers of the German people are deliberately and cynically preparing to hurl them into a wicked and a desperate war of conquest...The Germans cannot prevent that war, because they do not believe it is coming. The British could prevent that war if, before it is too late, they could be really convinced that it is coming. That is why I want to convince them that war is coming, because I want to prevent that horrible war.

Blatchford was impressed by the cleanliness and efficiency in Germany: "You don't see anything like that in Germany. I thought to myself, is this how we are preparing to fight for the existence of our Empire? What use will these ragged, famished spectres be when we have our backs to the wall?"

== Later life ==
On 4 August 1914, Blatchford wrote to his friend Alexander Thompson: "I shall write today a cautious article counselling peace and suggesting that Sir E. Grey should ask Russia and Germany to suspend hostilities pending a friendly mediation by America, England and Italy, or any one of those powers. But I do not think really that European peace is possible until Germany has been defeated and humiliated. And I realise the great possibility that we shall be at war with Germany before the Clarion comes out. And I hope we are". The Clarion Movement was split when Blatchford swung his paper in support of the British participation in the First World War. The circulation for The Clarion fell by 10,000 in a week but when in September 1914 Blatchford wrote a page of The Weekly Dispatch every Sunday its circulation rose by 50,000. In his first article for that paper, Blatchford correctly predicted that the German Army would not reach Paris and of General Joffre's flank along the Marne.

Blatchford visited France in October 1914 and was shocked by the conduct of the Germans in waging war. Initially warning his readers of fake atrocity stories, Blatchford was shocked by the ruined villages in France and the stories he heard, "too horrible and too unclean to be revealed in print". He wrote to Thompson in 1933: "In the early days of the war the movement howled with indignation about the lying charges brought against the German General Staff and troops. The noble Germans were incapable of such crimes. British and Belgian and American witnesses were all liars. Today the same intelligent comrades are denouncing the atrocities committed by the Nazi 'storm troops' upon innocent and helpless Jews. Well, old pal, may I suggest that if the Germans of today are guilty perhaps the Huns of 1914 were not quite innocent".

In his articles during the war, Blatchford campaigned for better pay for the soldiers and considerable pensions for disabled soldiers, soldiers' widows and children. When a soldier wrote to him, claiming his opinions would not be accepted by the Army but those of Philip Snowden and Ramsay MacDonald would, Blatchford replied: "I am sorry. I cannot help it. You want peace. But you cannot have peace without victory...The struggle with Germany will not end with the present war, and we may some day have to fight Germany single-handed".

In 1915, Blatchford formed the National Democratic and Labour Party (NDP) as a splinter from the right wing of the British Socialist Party and for the 1918 General Election, the NDP stood in eighteen constituencies and returned nine Members of Parliament with 156,834 votes. It thereby became the first party formed by a right-wing split from the Labour Party in Britain to win seats in Parliament at a general election.

Blatchford's wife died in 1921, and later he took an interest in Spiritualism. In 1923 he wrote in response to claims in the press that he had been converted away from socialism by reading Henry Ford's autobiography:

I have never been converted from Socialism. But careful observation of the facts of for the last twelve years or so has convinced me that Socialism will not work, and a study of Mr. Ford's methods has provided what seems to me as good a substitute as we may hope in this imperfect world. Socialism as I knew it in past years was an excellent, almost a perfect, theory...The golden rule will not work in international politics, because the nations are not good enough to live up to it. Real Socialism strongly resembles real Christianity. It is a counsel of perfection and cannot be adopted and adhered to by our imperfect humanity. There is nothing the matter with Socialism, but the people are neither wise enough nor good enough to make it a success. Socialism implies the self-abnegation of the individual for the good of the community.

When the first Labour government, led by Ramsay MacDonald, took office in 1924, Blatchford responded to Thompson's enthusiasm: "I don't like their policy and I don't trust them. They are in no sense Socialists. At present they are Liberals and we shall have a blend of Liberal Shibboleths and communist insanity". When Sir Edward Hulton sold most of his newspapers to Lord Rothermere, Blatchford wrote a letter to The Morning Post:

As a protest against the attempt of the syndicated newspapers to muzzle the press and dictate to the Government, I have resigned my position on The Sunday Chronicle and The Sunday Herald...the public should be helped to realise that the political judgments of the syndicated newspapers are not sincere and considered opinions of trained, independent thinkers, but the broadcast railings of one rich man in a panic over the Capital Levy. It is important that this should be said, and that the country should understand that the voice of Lord Rothermere is not the voice of public opinion. His standardised newspapers are journalistic tied houses, where proprietorial dope is sold as honest beer.

Blatchford voted Conservative in 1924. However, his later books indicate a continued faith in his own English version of socialism. Moreover, the Clarion Movement carried on as a socialist popular movement, taking its cue from Blatchford, into the 1930s and beyond, as indicated by the continued existence of the Clarion rambling and cycling clubs and the founding of the newspaper The New Clarion in 1932. In a 1931 letter to Alexander Thompson, Blatchford proclaimed his last political credo, his language remaining fiery and eloquent:

I have always been a Tory Democrat...You remember that from the first the Clarion crowd and the Hardie crowd were out of harmony ... I loathe the "top-hatted, frock-coated magnolia-scented" snobocracy as much as you do; but I cannot away with the Keir Hardies and Arthur Hendersons and Ramsay MacDonalds and Bernard Shaws and Maxtons. Not long ago you told me in a letter of some trade union delegates who were smoking cigars and drinking whisky at the House of Commons at the expense of their unions. You liked them not. Nor do I like the Trade Union bigots who have cheated J. H. Thomas of his pension...I am glad the Labour Party is defeated because I believe they would have disrupted the British Empire. I dreaded their childish cosmopolitanism; their foolish faith that we could abolish crime by reducing the police force. All the other nations are out for their own ends. American enthusiasm for Naval Disarmament is not dictated by a love of peace. It is an expression of naval rivalry. All the nations hated our naval supremacy. Do the Americans love us? Do the French love us? Is France, America, Italy, devoted to an unselfish and human peace? Can we dispel the bellicose sentiments of Russia and China and Japan by sending an old pantaloon to talk platitudes at Geneva, or by disbanding the Horse Guards and scrapping a few submarines?...The England of my affection and devotion is not a country nor a people: it is a tradition, the finest tradition the world has ever produced. The Labour Party do not subscribe to that tradition; do not know it; could not feel it. And if that tradition is to survive, the policy of scuttle and surrender must be abandoned. You agree with all this I feel sure. You always upheld the Pax Britannica. We have not drifted apart, old pal: our separation is only geographical.

After Adolf Hitler became German Chancellor in 1933, Blatchford "began to smell brimstone", in the words of his biographer Laurence Thompson. Blatchford said: "The people ought to know; but who will let me say what ought to be said?" Blatchford feared that people would say: "Oh, Blatchford. He has Germany on the brain." When Winston Churchill began warning of the dangers of Nazi Germany, Blatchford remarked: "Ha! He's learning! Now watch him get it in the neck". Later on, Blatchford believed Churchill's conduct redeemed what he considered his past political errors.

On 17 December 1943, Blatchford died in Horsham, Sussex at the age of 92.

== Legacy ==
Blatchford's "love of country" themes were not a late aberration but can be found throughout his output. His combination of libertarianism, socialism and conservatism mark him out as one of the more original activists in English political history. The first Labour Chancellor of the Exchequer, Philip Snowden, said of Blatchford in his autobiography:

In these years Mr. Blatchford gave invaluable help to Socialist propaganda. No man did more than he to make Socialism understood by the ordinary working man. His writings in them had nothing of economic abstruseness. He based his appeal on the principles of human justice. He preached Socialism as a system of industrial co-operation for the common good. His arguments and illustrations were drawn from facts and experiences within the knowledge of the common people. Socialism as he taught it was not a cold, materialistic theory, but the promise of a new life as full, sweet and noble as the world can give...Mr. Blatchford is still living, hale and hearty, his mental powers undiminished aged 83. I saw him recently, and we talked of those grand and inspiring times of forty years ago. Only the men who were in the Socialist movement in those days can know the great part Robert Blatchford took in making it popular, and of the personal devotion he inspired by his writings.

The General Secretary of the Trade Union Congress from 1925 to 1946, Sir Walter Citrine, was influenced by Blatchford's writings. He said of Britain for the British: "I found it a cogent and reasoned argument for Socialism. It was written with a clearness and bite which were unusual". Clement Attlee also spoke of Blatchford's influence on his beliefs. A. J. P. Taylor said that Blatchford was "the greatest popular journalist since Cobbett".

== Writings ==
- The Nunquam Papers (from the Sunday Chronicle) Edward Hulton and Co., 1891.
- Fantasias John Heywood, Manchester, 1892.
- Merrie England Clarion Office, Walter Scott, 1893.
- The Nunquam Papers (from The Clarion) Clarion Newspaper, 1895).
- A Bohemian Girl (McGinnis, P., pseudonym), London, 1898, Clarion Newspapers Co., Walter Scott, Ltd.
- Dismal England, London, Clarion Press, May 1899.
- My Favourite Books The Clarion Office, (also Chesworth, 1900)
- My Favourite Books, London, Clarion Press, 1901.
- Tales for the Marines, London, Clarion Newspaper Co., Ltd., 1901.
- Britain for the British, London, Clarion Press, 1902.
- A Book About Books, London, Clarion Press, 1903.
- God and My Neighbour Clarion Press, 1903.
- Not Guilty: A Defense of the Bottom Dog Clarion Press, 1906.
- The Sorcery Shop: An Impossible Romance, London, Clarion Press, 1907.
- The Dolly Ballads (Illustrated by Frank Chesworth) Clarion Press, 1907.
- The War That Was Foretold: Germany and England, Reprinted from “The Daily Mail” of 1909.
- My Life in the Army, London, Clarion Press, 1910.
- More Things in Heaven and Earth: Adventures in the Quest for a Soul, London, Methuen & Co., 1925.
- As I Lay A-Thinking: Some Memories and Reflections of an Ancient and Quiet Watchman Hodder & Stoughton, London, 1926.
- Essays of To-Day and Yesterday, London, George G. Harrap & Co., Ltd., 1927.
- Saki’s Bowl, London, Hodder & Stoughton Publishers, 1928.
- Where Are the Dead, London, Cassell and Company, Ltd., 1928 [Contains a chapter by Blatchford, “Secrets of Life and Love.”]
- My Eighty Years, Great Britain, Cassell & Company Limited. 1931.
- What's All This?, London, George Routledge & Sons, Ltd., 1940.
- General Von Sneak, London, Hodder & Stoughton, Publishers, n.d.
- Julie A Study of a Girl by a Man, London, Clarion Press, 1904
- Stunts, London, Clarion Press, n.d.
