= Edward Carpenter =

English poet and academic (1844–1929)

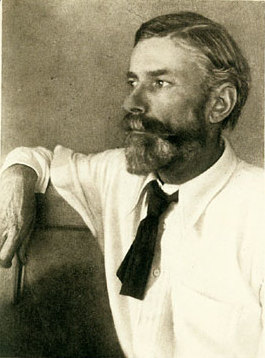
- Born: Edward Carpenter; 29 August 1844; Hove, Sussex, England
- Died: 28 June 1929 (aged 84); Guildford, Surrey, England
- Resting place: Mount Cemetery, Guildford, England
- Occupations: Poet; anthologist; early LGBT activist; socialist; philosopher
- Political party: Social Democratic Federation; Socialist League
- Partner: George Merrill (1891–1928)
- Relatives: James Carpenter (grandfather)

Edward Carpenter (29 August 1844 – 28 June 1929) was an English utopian socialist, poet, philosopher, anthologist, an early activist for gay rights and prison reform whilst advocating vegetarianism and taking a stance against vivisection. As a philosopher, he was particularly known for his publication of Civilisation: Its Cause and Cure. Here, he described civilisation as a form of disease through which human societies pass.

An early advocate of sexual liberation, he had an influence on both D. H. Lawrence and Sri Aurobindo, and inspired E. M. Forster's novel Maurice.

== Early life ==
Born at 45 Brunswick Square, Hove in Sussex, Carpenter was educated at nearby Brighton College, where his father Charles Carpenter was a governor. His brothers Charles, George and Alfred also went to school there. Edward's grandfather was Admiral James Carpenter (1760–1845). When he was ten, Carpenter displayed a flair for the piano.

His academic ability became evident relatively late in his youth, but was sufficient to earn him a place at Trinity Hall, Cambridge. At Trinity Hall, Carpenter came under the influence of Christian Socialist theologian F. D. Maurice. Whilst there he also began to explore his feelings for men. One of the most notable examples of this is his close friendship with Edward Anthony Beck (later Master of Trinity Hall), which, according to Carpenter, had "a touch of romance". Beck eventually ended their friendship, causing Carpenter great emotional heartache. Carpenter graduated as 10th Wrangler in 1868. After university, he was ordained as curate of the Church of England, "as a convention rather than out of deep Conviction", and served as curate to Maurice at the parish of St Edward's, Cambridge.

In 1871 Carpenter was invited to become tutor to the royal princes George Frederick (later King George V) and his elder brother, Prince Albert Victor, Duke of Clarence, but declined the position. His lifelong friend and fellow Cambridge student John Neale Dalton took the position. Carpenter continued to visit Dalton while he was tutor. They were given photographs of the pair, taken by the princes.

In the following years he experienced an increasing sense of dissatisfaction with his life in the church and university, and became weary of what he saw as the hypocrisy of Victorian society. He found great solace in reading poetry, later remarking that his discovery of the work of Walt Whitman caused "a profound change" in him. Five or six years later he visited Whitman in Camden, New Jersey, in 1877.

== Move to the North of England ==
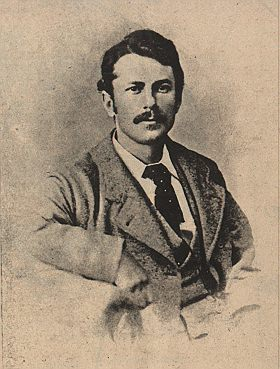
Edward Carpenter in 1875

Carpenter was voluntarily released from the Anglican ministry and left the church in 1874 and moved to Leeds, becoming a lecturer as part of University Extension Movement, which was formed by academics who wished to widen access to education in deprived communities. He lectured in astronomy, the lives of ancient Greek women and music and had hoped to lecture to the working classes, but found his lectures were mostly attended by middle class people, many of whom showed little active interest in the subjects he taught. Disillusioned, he moved to Chesterfield, but finding that town dull, moved to nearby Sheffield a year later. Here he came into contact with manual workers, and he began to write poetry. His sexual preferences were for working men: "the grimy and oil-besmeared figure of a stoker" or "the thick-thighed hot coarse-fleshed young bricklayer with a strap around his waist".

When his father Charles Carpenter died in 1882, Edward inherited the sum of £6,000 (equivalent to £620,000 in 2025). This enabled Carpenter to quit his lectureship to seek the simpler life, first on a small holding at Totley near Sheffield with Albert Ferneyhough, a scythe-maker, and his family in 1880; Albert and Edward became lovers and in 1883 moved to Millthorpe, Derbyshire together with Albert's family, where Carpenter built a large new house with outbuildings in 1883 constructed of local gritstone with a slate roof, in the style of the seventeenth century. There they had a small market garden and made and sold leather sandals, based on the design of sandals sent to him from India by Harold Cox on Carpenter's request.

Carpenter popularised the phrase the "Simple Life" in his essay Simplification of Life in his essay collection England's Ideal (1887). Sheffield architect Raymond Unwin was a frequent visitor to Millthorpe and the simple revival of vernacular English architecture at Millthorpe and Carpenter's 'simple life' there were powerful influences on Unwin's later Garden City architecture and ideals, suggesting as they did a coherent but radical new lifestyle.

In Sheffield, Carpenter became increasingly radical. Influenced by a disciple of Engels, Henry Hyndman, he joined the Social Democratic Federation (SDF) in 1883 and attempted to form a branch in the city. The group instead chose to remain independent, and became the Sheffield Socialist Society. While in the city he worked on a number of projects including highlighting the poor living conditions of industrial workers. In 1884, he left the SDF with William Morris to join the Socialist League. From there he stayed with William Harrison Riley while he was visiting Walt Whitman.

In 1883, Carpenter published the first part of Towards Democracy, a long poem expressing Carpenter's ideas about "spiritual democracy" and how Carpenter believed humanity could move towards a freer and more just society. Towards Democracy was heavily influenced by Whitman's poetry, as well as the Hindu scripture, the Bhagavad Gita. Expanded editions of Towards Democracy appeared in 1885, 1892, and 1902; the complete edition of Towards Democracy was published in 1905.

In 1886–87 Carpenter was in a relationship with George Hukin, a razor grinder. Carpenter lived with Cecil Reddie from 1888 to 1889 and in 1889 helped Reddie found Abbotsholme School in Derbyshire as a notably progressive alternative to the traditional public school, with the financial support of Robert Muirhead and William Cassels.

In May 1889, Carpenter wrote a piece in the Sheffield Independent calling Sheffield the laughing-stock of the civilized world and said that the giant thick cloud of smog rising out of Sheffield was like the smoke arising from Judgment Day, and that it was the altar on which the lives of many thousands would be sacrificed. He said that 100,000 adults and children were struggling to find sunlight and air, enduring miserable lives, unable to breathe and dying of related illnesses.

== Travel in India ==
At the invitation of his Ceylonese Tamil friend, Ponnambalam Arunachalam, he travelled to Ceylon and India, where—through Arunachalam—he met a jnani and guru from Thanjavur, Arulparananda Swamigal (originally Ramaswamy Pillai), from whom he gained deep insight into yoga, Vedanta, and Shaiva Siddhanta. Through Arulparananda's teaching on equality, he developed the conviction that socialism would bring about a revolution in human consciousness as well as in economic conditions. His account of the travel was published in 1892 as From Adam's Peak to Elephanta: Sketches in Ceylon and India. The book's spiritual explorations would subsequently influence the Russian author Peter Ouspensky, who discusses it extensively in his own book, Tertium Organum (1912).

== Life with George Merrill ==
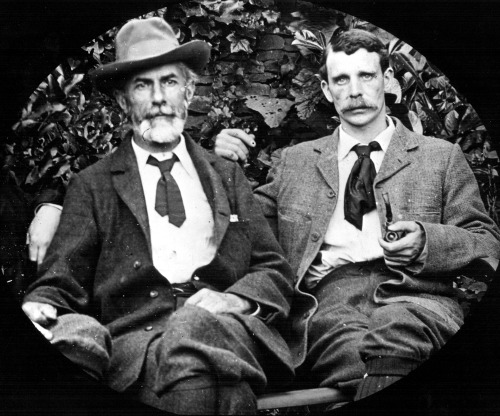
Carpenter and Merrill c. 1900

On his return from India in 1891, he met George Merrill, a working-class man also from Sheffield, 22 years his junior. After the Ferneyhoughs left Millthorpe in 1893, Merrill became Carpenter's companion. The two remained partners for the rest of their lives, cohabiting from 1898. Merrill, the son of an engine driver, had been raised in the slums of Sheffield and had little formal education.

Carpenter remarked in his work The Intermediate Sex:

Eros is a great leveller. Perhaps the true Democracy rests, more firmly than anywhere else, on a sentiment which easily passes the bounds of class and caste, and unites in the closest affection the most estranged ranks of society. It is noticeable how often Uranians of good position and breeding are drawn to rougher types, as of manual workers, and frequently very permanent alliances grow up in this way, which although not publicly acknowledged have a decided influence on social institutions, customs and political tendencies.

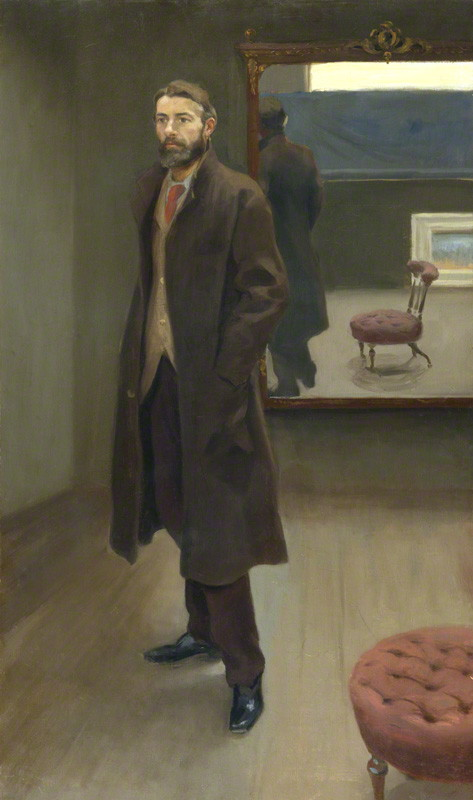
Edward Carpenter (1894) by Roger Fry (1866–1934), oil on canvas; given by the artist, 1930

Carpenter included among his friends the scholar, author, naturalist, and founder of the Humanitarian League, Henry S. Salt, and his wife, Catherine; the critic, essayist and sexologist, Havelock Ellis, and his wife, Edith; actor and producer Ben Iden Payne; Labour activists Bruce and Katharine Glasier; writer and scholar, John Addington Symonds; and the feminist writer, Olive Schreiner.

E. M. Forster was a close friend and visited the couple regularly. He later recounted that it was a visit to Millthorpe in 1913 that inspired him to write his gay-themed novel, Maurice. Forster wrote in his terminal note to the aforementioned novel that Merrill "touched my backside – gently and just above the buttocks. I believe he touched most people's. The sensation was unusual and I still remember it, as I remember the position of a long vanished tooth. He made a profound impression on me and touched a creative spring."

The relationship between Carpenter and Merrill was an inspiration for the relationship between Maurice Hall and Alec Scudder, the gamekeeper in Maurice. The author D. H. Lawrence read the manuscript of Maurice, which was published posthumously in 1971. Carpenter's rural lifestyle and the manuscript influenced Lawrence's 1928 novel Lady Chatterley's Lover which, though built around a central relationship between a man and a woman, involves a gamekeeper and a member of the upper class.

== Later life ==
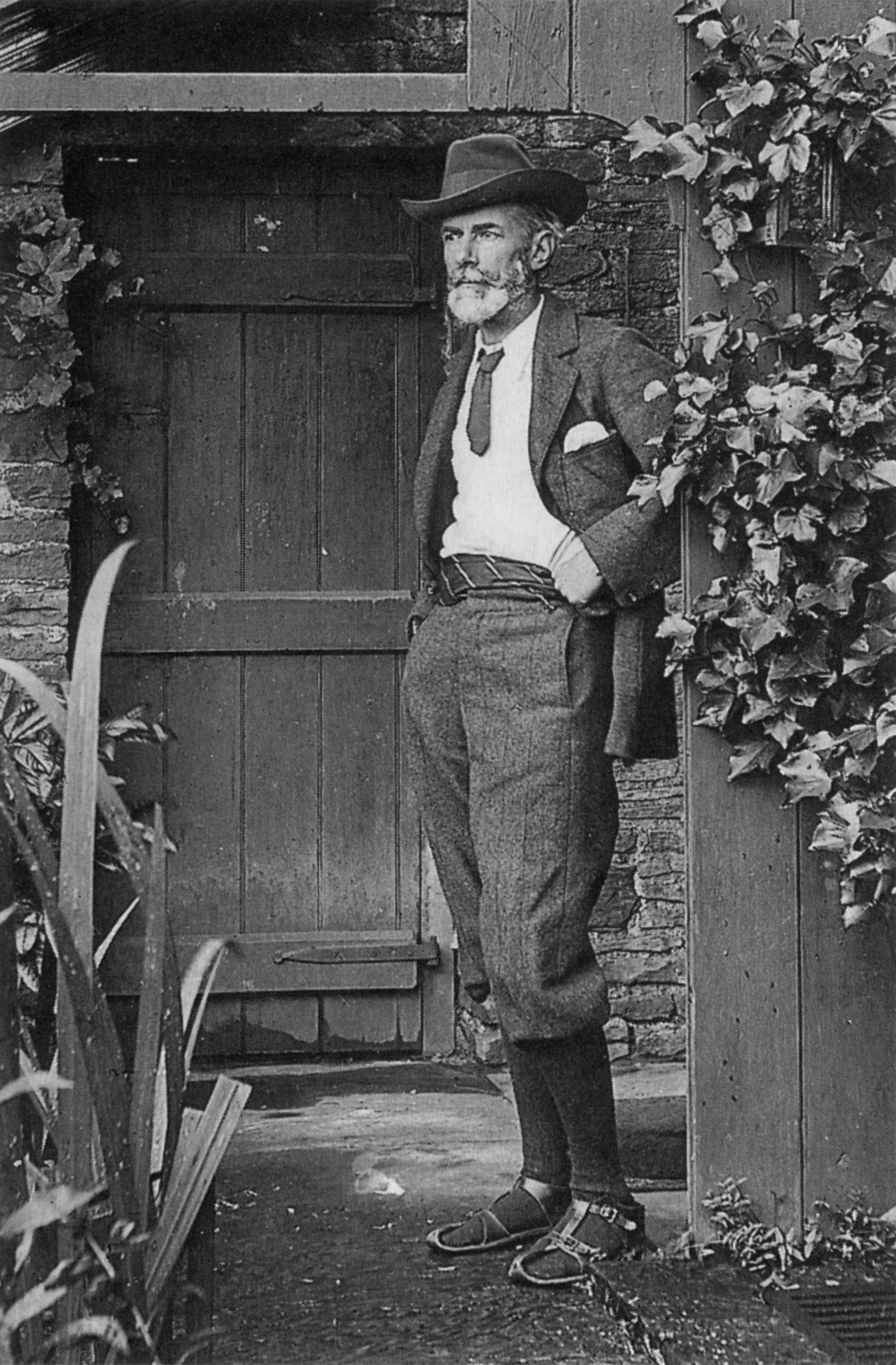
Edward Carpenter in 1905

In 1902 Carpenter's anthology of verse and prose, Ioläus: An Anthology of Friendship, was published. The book was published again in 1906 by William Swan Sonnenschein.

In 1915, he published The Healing of Nations and the Hidden Sources of Their Strife, where he argued that the source of war and discontent in western society was class-monopoly and social inequality.

Carpenter became an advocate of the Christ myth theory. His book Pagan and Christian Creeds was published by Harcourt, Brace and Howe in 1921.

The death of George Hukin in 1917 at the age of 56 seems to have broken Carpenter's attachment to the North of England. In 1922 he and Merrill moved to Guildford, Surrey and the two lived at 23 Mountside Rd. On Carpenter's 80th birthday he was presented an album signed by every member of the then Labour Government, headed by Ramsay MacDonald, Prime Minister, whom Carpenter had known since his teenage years.

In January 1928, Merrill died suddenly, having become an alcoholic since moving to Surrey. His death devastated Carpenter; he sold their joint home and moved in with his carer Ted Inigan. In May 1928, Carpenter suffered a paralytic stroke. He lived another 13 months before he died on 28 June 1929, aged 84. He was interred in the same grave as Merrill at the Mount Cemetery in Guildford under a lengthy invocation written by Carpenter.

His obituary in The Times was headed "Edward Carpenter, Author and Poet", though the text did also refer to his political campaigns.

== Influence ==
Carpenter corresponded with many leading figures in political and cultural circles, among them Annie Besant, Isadora Duncan, Havelock Ellis, Roger Fry, Mahatma Gandhi, Keir Hardie, Jack London, George Merrill, E. D. Morel, William Morris, Edward R. Pease, John Ruskin, and Olive Schreiner.

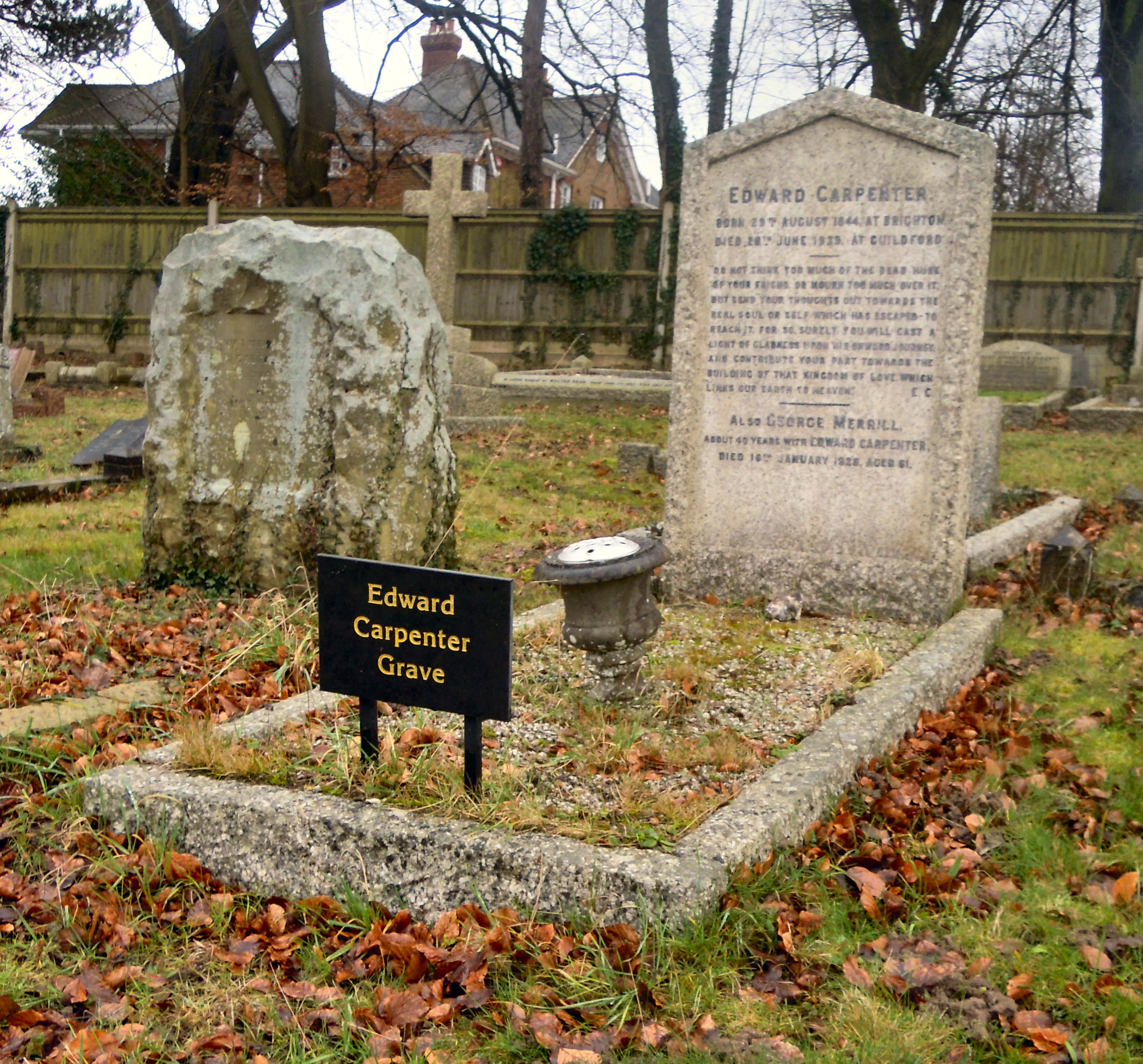
The grave of Carpenter and George Merrill at the Mount Cemetery, in Guildford, Surrey

Carpenter was a friend of Rabindranath Tagore, and of Walt Whitman. Aldous Huxley recommended Carpenter's pamphlet Civilization: Its Cause and Cure in his book Science, Liberty and Peace. Modernist art critic Herbert Read credited Carpenter's pamphlet Non-Governmental Society with converting him to anarchism.

Leslie Paul was influenced by Carpenter's work; in turn he passed on Carpenter's ideas to the scouting group he founded, The Woodcraft Folk. Algernon Blackwood was another devotee of Carpenter's work; Blackwood corresponded with Carpenter and included a quotation from Civilization: Its Cause and Cure in his 1911 novel The Centaur.

Fenner Brockway, in a 1929 obituary of Carpenter, acknowledged him as an influence on Brockway and his associates when young. Brockway described Carpenter as "the greatest spiritual inspiration of our lives. Towards Democracy was our Bible." Ansel Adams was an admirer of Carpenter's writings, especially Towards Democracy. Emma Goldman cited Carpenter's books as an influence on her thought, and stated that Carpenter possessed "the wisdom of the sage." Countee Cullen said that reading Carpenter's book Iolaus "opened up for me soul windows which had been closed".

Carpenter was sometimes called "the English Tolstoy" and Tolstoy himself considered him "a worthy heir of Carlyle and Ruskin".

== Revival of reputation ==
Following his death, Carpenter's written works fell out of print and were largely forgotten except among devotees of British labour movement history. However, in the 1970s and 1980s, interest in his work was revived by historians such as Jeffrey Weeks and Sheila Rowbotham, and some of Carpenter's works were reprinted by the Gay Men's Press. Carpenter's opposition to pollution and cruelty to animals has resulted in some historians arguing that Carpenter's ideas anticipated the modern Green and animal rights movements. Carpenter was described by Fiona MacCarthy as the "Saint in Sandals", the "Noble Savage" and, more recently, the "gay godfather of the British left".

== Written works ==
1870s

- 1870 The Religious Influence of Art.
- 1873 Narcissus and other Poems.
- 1875 Moses: A Drama in Five Acts (later revised as The Promised Land, 1911).

1880s

- 1885 Modern Money-Lending and the Meaning of Dividends: A Tract.
- 1887 England's Ideal: And Other Essays on Social Subject.
- 1888 Chants of Labour: A Song Book of the People with Music.
- 1889 Civilisation: Its Cause and Cure.

1890s

- 1892 From Adam's Peak to Elephanta: Sketches in Ceylon and India.
- 1892 A Visit to Gñani: from Adam's Peak to Elephanta.
- 1894 Homogenic Love and Its Place in a Free Society.
- 1894 Sex-Love and Its Place in a Free Society.
- 1894 Marriage in Free Society.
- 1896 Love's Coming of Age.
- 1897 An Unknown People.
- 1898 Angels' Wings: A Series of Essays on Art and its Relation to Life.

1900s

- 1902 Iolaus: Anthology of Friendship.
- 1904 The Art of Creation.
- 1905 Prisons, Police, and Punishment: An Inquiry into the Causes and Treatment of Crime and Criminals.
- 1905 Towards Democracy.
- 1906 Days with Walt Whitman: With Some Notes on His Life and Work.
- 1908 Sketches from Life in Town and Country.
- 1908 The Intermediate Sex: A Study of Some Transitional Types of Men and Women.

1910s

- 1911 Non-Governmental Society.
- 1912 The Drama of Love and Death: A Study of Human Evolution and Transfiguration.
- 1913 George Merrill, A True History.
- 1914 Intermediate Types Among Primitive Folk: A Study in Social Evolution.
- 1915 The Healing of Nations.
- 1916 My Days and Dreams, Being Autobiographical Notes.
- 1916 The Story of My Books.
- 1916 Never Again!.
- 1917 Towards Industrial Freedom.

1920s

- 1920 Pagan and Christian Creeds: Their Origin and Meaning.
- 1923 The Story of Eros and Psyche.
- 1924 Some Friends of Walt Whitman: A Study in Sex-Psychology .
- 1925 The Psychology of the Poet Shelley.

Chants of Labour was a songbook for socialists, contributions to which Carpenter had solicited in The Commonweal. It comprised works by John Glasse, Edith Nesbit, John Bruce Glasier, Andreas Scheu, William Morris, Jim Connell, Herbert Burrows, and others.

== See also ==
- List of Christ myth theory proponents
