= Edwin Dodgson =

Church of England missionary (1846–1918)

Edwin Heron Dodgson

Edwin Heron Dodgson (30 June 1846 – 3 January 1918) was a clergyman in the Church of England and the youngest brother of Charles Lutwidge Dodgson (Lewis Carroll), author of Alice's Adventures in Wonderland. He is primarily remembered for his work as a missionary in the island of Tristan da Cunha in the South Atlantic Ocean, the most remote human settlement in the world.

== Early life and ordination ==
Edwin Heron Dodgson was born on 30 June 1846 in Croft-on-Tees, North Yorkshire, the eleventh and youngest child of the Rev. Charles Dodgson, Rector of Croft and Archdeacon of Richmond, and his wife Frances Jane Dodgson née Lutwidge. His second Christian name is a tribute to Canon George Heron, a Cheshire friend of Archdeacon Dodgson.

Edwin's mother died when he was four years old and he was raised by his maiden aunt Lucy Lutwidge. He was educated at Twyford School, and in 1860 went to Rugby School, where the Headmaster was Frederick Temple, who later became the Archbishop of Canterbury. He worked briefly for the Board of Trade before entering Chichester Theological College in September 1871. The college was Anglo-Catholic, a tradition which Edwin held dear, to the chagrin of his elder brother Charles.

He was ordained deacon in 1873, and priest in 1874, and served his first curacy at Odd Rode in the Diocese of Chester. Following this, he served as curate at Helmsley (1875–1877), and at All Saints, Shrewsbury (1877–1879). His subsequent ministry was one of self-sacrifice and dedication, marred by ill health and depression.

== Zanzibar and Tristan da Cunha ==
Dodgson was appointed as Principal of the (UMCA) Kiungani School in Zanzibar in 1879, where he served under Bishop Edward Steere. However, as his brother Charles noted, "the ague was too much for him there". In 1880 he was appointed by the Society for the Propagation of the Gospel (SPG) as missionary and school teacher to Tristan da Cunha, a post which the Bishop of St Helena had been attempting to fill since 1866. Dodgson volunteered to fill the post and the SPG undertook to provide a stipend of £100 a year.

Tristan da Cunha is the most isolated human community in the world, 2,173 km (1,350 mi) from the nearest inhabited place, Saint Helena island. At the time, the population of Tristan da Cunha was about 100 and there was no regular transport to the island. The schooner Edward Vittery was chartered at a cost of £35 to take Dodgson from Saint Helena to Tristan. He landed safely on 25 February 1881. Unfortunately, a gale sprang up and the boat was driven ashore and wrecked at a spot later named in honour of the occasion as Down-Where-The-Minister-Land-His-Things, as it still appears on maps of the island. All of Dodgson's books (except 100 copies of the Mission Hymn Book), the harmonium, and most of his stores were lost, but the communion vessels were saved, as was a stone font.

Shortly after his arrival Dodgson noted that "There are now 107 persons on the island in sixteen families. They all speak English, slightly Yankeefied. I like them very much [...] They live just like one large family [...] Mostly the women can read a little, and some can write, but there is only one who can do both with any likelihood of being intelligible". He continued: "There are about forty children in the school, divided into four classes". With great effort he set about his major tasks as priest and school teacher. He remarked, "They are decidedly a religious people in their simple way." His brother Charles noted that "At Tristan he was monarch of all he surveyed and could carry on matters ecclesiastical exactly as he liked, which was delightful for such an extreme ritualist as he is".

In 1882 Dodgson was optimistic about his progress, and his reports to England reflect his enthusiasm and energy. During that year the Admiralty diverted HMS Diamond to Tristan to deliver books, school materials and a harmonium. With the aid of the harmonium Dodgson introduced daily choral services, even though at the time there was no church. He noted that the daily worship had a good attendance, "with an average congregation of 20 adults plus children" and the same year he noted "I have been able to supply everyone on the island who can read with a Bible, Prayer book and hymn book".

However, Dodgson was to lose his optimism. In 1884 he notes "Only three of the children show the smallest improvement in intelligence. I attribute this to the unnatural state of isolation in which they are living. It is simply impossible for you to realize the mindlessness of the children and young people and also of the grown-up people". He despaired of the situation, and remarked, "There is not the slightest reason for this island to be inhabited at all. It has been my daily prayer that God would open up some way for us all to leave the island". Thus he advocated the evacuation of Tristan da Cunha, and on this, he seriously disagreed with Peter Green, the principal spokesman for the island.

Dodgson served as SPG priest in Tristan from 1880 to 1884, when Bishop Thomas Welby of Saint Helena granted him permission to return to England, having heard from a whaling captain of his "very depressed state of mind". He arrived back in England in February 1885, having paid for his own passage. On arrival in England, he was suffering from a concussion as a result of falling down a hatchway on board the ship. The injuries resulting from the fall were to plague him for many years.

In England, he continued to work for the well-being of the people of Tristan and he was assisted in this by his brother Charles. Their efforts to arrange for the migration of the inhabitants of Tristan, which included an interview with the Prime Minister, Lord Salisbury, in December 1885, failed. At the beginning of 1886, Salisbury wrote that he considered the migration of islanders and cattle to be "entirely impracticable".

Fifteen working men, a large portion of the adult male population of Tristan, perished in a boat accident in 1885. When Dodgson learned of this he actively sought to aid the surviving inhabitants and the Colonial Office paid for his return to Tristan da Cunha on board HMS Thalia. He arrived on the island on 4 August 1886. "I think it is my plain duty to throw in my lot with them and minister to their souls", he wrote. He remained at Tristan, for a time without any stipend, until December 1889, when again he had to return to England because of poor health. At that time he remarked, "I have not the slightest intention of going back to Tristan da Cunha. The intellect of the Tristanites is now so dwarfed by reason of their utter isolation that I do not think that I or anyone else could be of use to them. The only thing is to get them all away so that no more children may be brought up there". Tristan remained without a priest until 1906.

== Cape Verde and St Helena ==
From Tristan, Dodgson moved to Cape Verde, where he was the first person to hold the unusual post of SPG chaplain at São Vicente (1890–1895). He, and his successor, the Rev. T. P. W. Thorman, found the work there discouraging. There was no church and the priest was obliged to use a room let for the purposes of worship. The principal work involved ministry to the English residents, mainly single young men in service of the Brazilian Submarine Telegraph Company.

By 1895, Charles Dodgson was actively seeking an English parish for Edwin and Edwin himself resolved to return to England about this time, with a view to being a prison chaplain. However, he changed his mind and in 1896 he succeeded the Rev. Stephen Ellis as Vicar of St James Church in Jamestown, St Helena. St James is the oldest Anglican place of worship south of the equator, having been consecrated in 1772.

As at Tristan, so also at St James, Dodgson encouraged choral services and worked hard in the parish. Indeed, this was the only time in his ministry when Dodgson had his own parish church. It appears that his relationship with the elderly Bishop of St Helena was difficult. Another member of the clergy on the island wrote, "I am afraid that poor Mr. Dodgson is not the comfort to the Bishop that was anticipated".

Though not geographically large, the Jamestown parish was very hilly, and by 1898 Dodgson noted that he "did not feel equal to much locomotion", as his legs and back had been affected by ague in Zanzibar. He left St Helena in June 1899. He then returned to England, living initially with his sisters at a house called The Chestnuts in Guildford. In 1901, his doctor informed him that his difficulty with mobility was due to damage to the spinal cord and that he hoped to "try a galvanic battery" to assist a cure.

== Final years ==
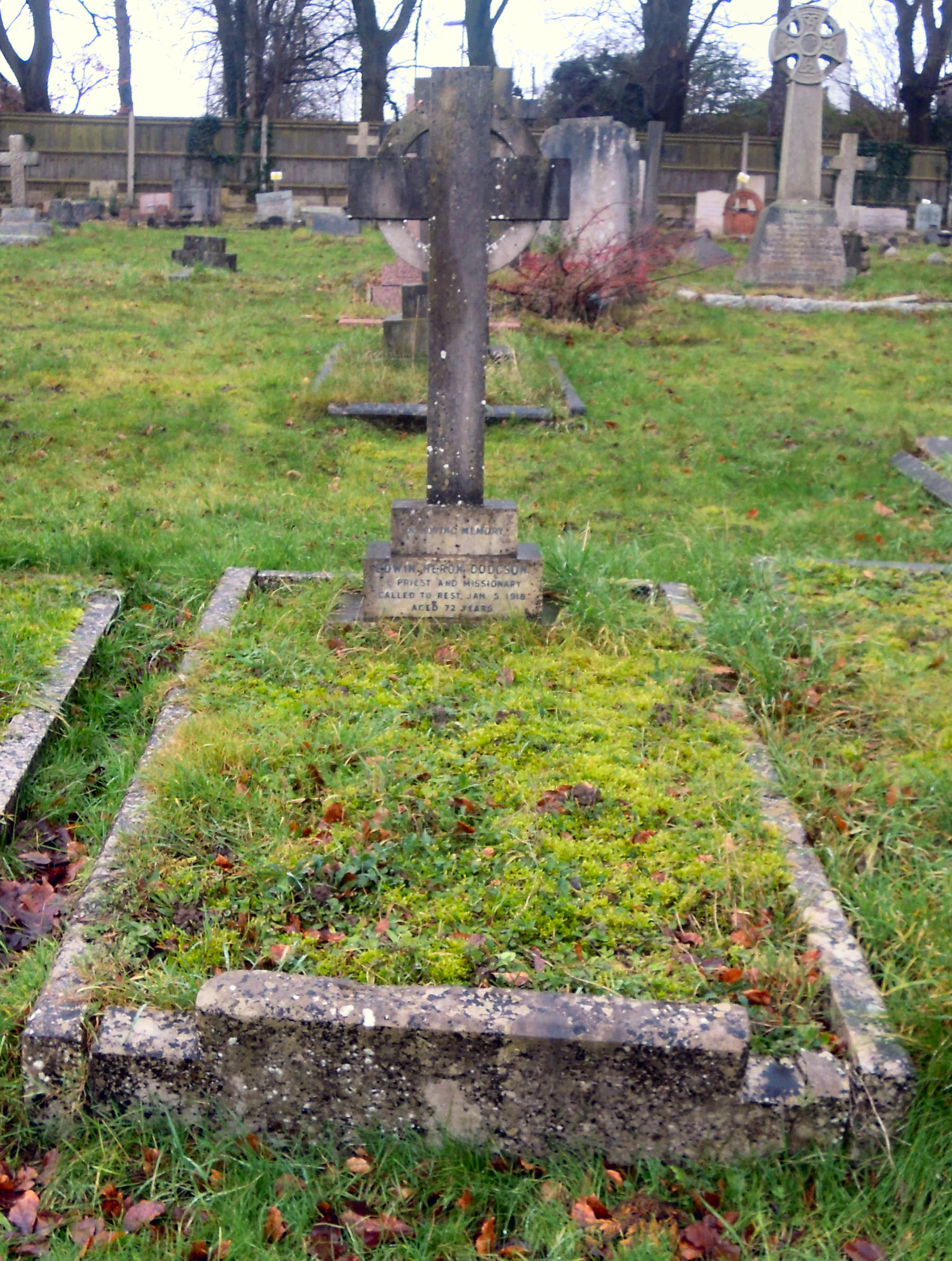
The grave of Edwin Dodgson in the Mount Cemetery

Dodgson worked as curate for the villages of Willingale, Shellow Bowells, and Berners Roding, in Essex, from 1902 to 1905. After leaving Essex he returned to the family home in Guildford until 1909 when he moved to the Homes of St Barnabas, East Grinstead, an institution founded in 1895 by Canon William Cooper to provide a home for poor retired clergy of the Anglo-Catholic tradition. He lived there until 1914 when, once more, he returned to Guildford.

Edwin Heron Dodgson died at The Chestnuts, Guildford. His grave is in the Mount Cemetery in Guildford. He never married.

Tristan da Cunha has issued postage stamps commemorating Edwin Dodgson's arrival and ministry on the island.

== Sources ==
- Edward Cannan, Churches of the South Atlantic Islands, 1502–1991, (Oswestry, Shropshire: Anthony Nelson, 1992). ISBN 0-904614-47-6
- The Letters of Lewis Carroll, eds. Morton N. Cohen and Roger Lancelyn Green, vols. I and II, (New York: Oxford University Press, 1979). ISBN 0-19-520090-X
