= Raymond Unwin =

English architect (1963–1940)

Sir Raymond Unwin
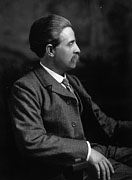
- Unwin c. 1900
- Born: 2 November 1863; Rotherham, Yorkshire, England
- Died: 29 June 1940 (aged 76); Lyme, Connecticut, US
- Occupations: Engineer and town planner
- Known for: Improvements in working class housing
- Political party: Socialist League

Sir Raymond Unwin (2 November 1863 – 29 June 1940) was a prominent and influential English engineer, architect and town planner, with an emphasis on improvements in working class housing.

== Early years ==
Raymond Unwin was born in Rotherham, Yorkshire and grew up in Oxford, after his father sold up his business and moved there to study. He was educated at Magdalen College School, Oxford. In 1884 he returned to the North to become an apprentice engineer for Stavely Iron & Coal Company near Chesterfield.

Unwin had become interested in social issues at an early age and was inspired by the lectures and ideals of John Ruskin and William Morris. In 1885 he moved to Manchester and became secretary of Morris's local Socialist League. He wrote articles for the League's newspaper and spoke on street corners for its cause and for the Labour Church. He also became a close friend of the socialist philosopher Edward Carpenter, whose Utopian community ideas led to his developing a small commune at Millthorpe near Sheffield.

In 1887 he returned to Staveley Iron as an engineer, working on development of mining townships and various other buildings, and joined the Sheffield Socialist Society.

In 1893 he married Richard Barry Parker's sister Ethel, and formed a partnership in 1896 based in Buxton, Derbyshire. The partners preferred the simple vernacular style and made it their aim to improve housing standards for the working classes. They were also members of the Northern Art Worker's Guild and were close friends of Edgar Wood (1860–1935) the leading Arts and Crafts architect in the North of England and a founding member of the group.

== Planning career ==
In their various writings, including their book The Art of Building a Home (1901), Parker and Unwin aimed to popularise the Arts and Crafts Movement, and as a result of their success thousands of homes were built on their pattern in the early part of the 20th century.

A notable example of one of their earliest collaborations at Clayton, Staffordshire, is dated to 1899, and was originally called the Goodfellow House after the man who commissioned it. Parker and Unwin were involved in designing many of the interior fittings, which remain in the house to this day, and the initial layout of the large gardens. Goodfellow sold the house in 1926 to Colley Shorter who ran the nearby pottery works of Wilkinson's and Newport. He renamed it Chetwynd House and when he married his star designer Clarice Cliff in 1940, she moved into the house and lived there until 1972. It is her association that has made the house particularly famous since.

In 1902 Parker and Unwin were asked to design a model village at New Earswick near York for Joseph and Benjamin Seebohm Rowntree, and the following year they were given the opportunity to take part in the creation of Letchworth (loosely based on the Utopian plan of Ebenezer Howard), when the First Garden City Company asked them to submit a plan.

In 1903 they were involved with the "Cottages Near a Town Exhibit" for the Northern Art Workers Guild of Manchester. In 1904 after their plan was adopted they opened a second office at Baldock. In 1905 Henrietta Barnett asked them to plan the new garden suburb at Hampstead, now known as Hampstead Garden Suburb.

Unwin moved from Letchworth to Hampstead in 1906, and he lived here for the rest of his life at the farmstead Wyldes Farm.

In 1907, Ealing Tenants Limited, a progressive cooperative in west London, appointed him to take forward the development of Brentham garden suburb.

Unwin joined the Local Government Board in December 1914. In 1915 he was seconded to the Ministry of Munitions to design the villages of Gretna and Eastriggs and supervise others. From 1917 he had an influential role at the Tudor Walters Committee on working-class housing whose report was published in 1918, the year in which he was appointed Chief Architect to the newly formed Ministry of Health. That post had evolved into the Chief Technical Officer for Housing and Town Planning by the time of his retirement in November 1928.

His demonstration during the Great War of the principles of building homes rapidly and economically whilst maintaining satisfactory standards for gardens, family privacy and internal spaces, gave him great influence over the Tudor Walters Committee and hence, indirectly, over much inter-war public housing. This report marked Unwin's definitive break from the traditional 'garden city' concept, as it proposed that the new developments should be peripheral 'satellites' rather than fully-fledged garden cities. Unwin became technical adviser to the Greater London Regional Planning Committee in 1929 and largely wrote its two reports, the first published in that year and the second in 1933.

Unwin was President of the Royal Town Planning Institute (RTPI) from 1915 to 1916, President of the Royal Institute of British Architects (RIBA) from 1931 to 1933, was knighted in 1932 and consulted by United States President Franklin D. Roosevelt on the New Deal in 1933. In 1936 he was appointed visiting Professor of Town Planning at Columbia University and in 1937 he received the RIBA Royal Gold Medal for architecture. He was awarded an honorary doctorate by Norwegian Institute of Technology in 1935 and by Harvard University in 1937.
