= John Rand Capron =

John Rand Capron (1829–1888) FRAS was an English amateur scientist, astronomer and photographer. Though a solicitor by profession, he became an expert on spectroscopy, particularly in relation to the aurora, and published many articles during his lifetime.

He is also remembered for a speculative letter, in the scientific journal Nature on early examples of "crop circles", in which he suggested they were caused by "cyclonic wind action".

== Life ==
Capron was born on 19 February 1829 in St. Leonards, Shoreditch, London, the son of a leather merchant. Educated at the Royal Grammar School, Guildford, he was articled to his uncle John Capron, a prominent Guildford solicitor. He entered into partnership with his uncle in 1850, and was also appointed Borough Coroner and Clerk of the Peace.

His obituary in the Monthly Notices of the Royal Astronomical Society described how at while at school, during convalescence from an attack of typhoid fever, he had been lent a microscope, which "opened out a new world of wonder and beauty" for him. Although initially interested in biology, fossils and the study of geology, he later developed a particular enthusiasm for the study of spectroscopy and astronomy, building a private observatory at Guildown on the "Hog's Back", Surrey. In 1877 he published a significant work on "Photographed Spectra", which provided reference photographs of the spectra of various elements. In 1879 he extended this into a study of the characteristics of the aurora, and in 1883 published an analysis of an extremely unusual phenomenon observed during the aurora of 17 November 1882; Capron was one of the first scientists to seriously research the nature of aurorae, particularly from a spectrographic perspective. He also conducted experiments on atmospheric electrical charges, fixing a "corona" of platinum wires on top of Booker's Tower on the Hog's Back, linked by wires to his observatory.

Capron was a prominent local philanthropist and was described as "ever ready, though in the most unostentatious manner, to afford aid and succour to those in poverty and distress". A contributor to The English Mechanic and World of Science commented "I have heard - what he tried hard enough to hide - that the good he did among the poor was something remarkable. Few men indeed possessing his wealth and leisure have devoted them more ungrudgingly to the benefit of others". He died on 12 November 1888 in Eastbourne.

A fir plantation near Normandy, Surrey, which Capron owned, still has the name "Rand's Plantation". The Surrey History Centre in Woking holds a collection of photographs believed to have been taken by Capron. The Guildford Institute Library in Guildford holds a collection of four albums of original sketches made by Capron on his travels in Britain and Europe.

== Personal life ==
Capron married Fanny Nibblett (1820–1909) in June 1856. They had one son, born in 1858.

== Books ==
In addition to many shorter articles, Capron published the following books:

- Photographed Spectra, London: E & F N Spon, 1877
- Auroræ: their characters and spectra, London: E & F N Spon, 1879
- A Plea for the Rainband, and the Rainband Vindicated, London: Edward Stanford, 1886
