= Mount Cemetery =

Cemetery in Surrey, England

Coordinates: 51°13′51″N 0°34′58″W

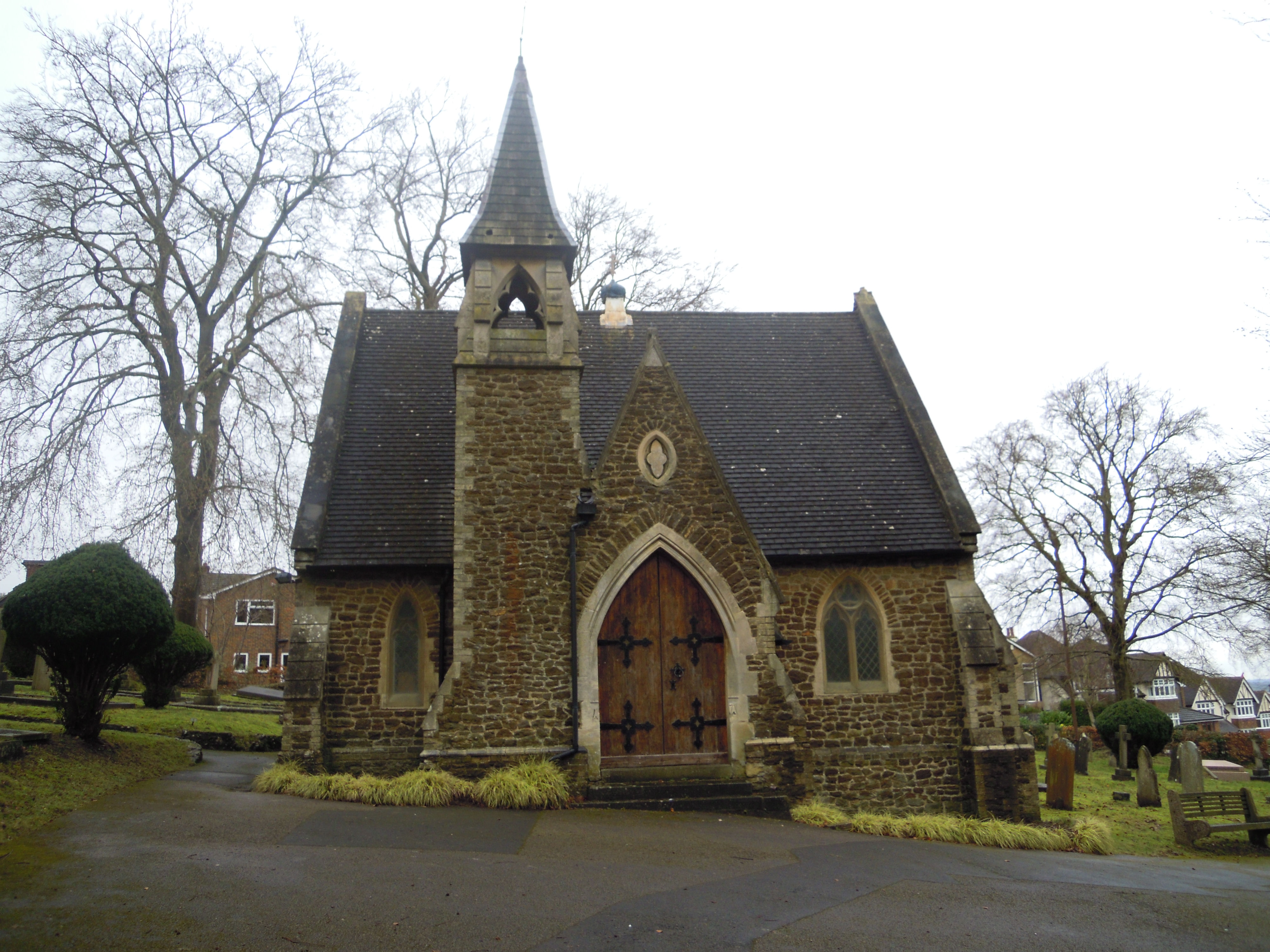
The Chapel at the Mount Cemetery

Mount Cemetery, also known as Guildford Cemetery, is a cemetery in Guildford, Surrey, England. It is the location of Booker's Tower.

Guildford Cemetery is surrounded by low-density houses with gardens and a covered reservoir beyond the east corner, immediately south of the successive residential streets of the Guildford Park and Farnham Road neighbourhoods west of Guildford, on the 'Guildown' or 'Mount' section of the western North Downs here forming the widest section of the Hog's Back.

Guildford Cemetery has in part views overlooking the town centre. Plots have been laid out to the maximum number its civic authority owner permits under rules set out in the 2000s. Burials are permitted in plots reserved or within an existing family grave to the deceased subject to a maximum of four related burials per plot.

The cemetery contains the war graves of 33 Commonwealth service personnel, 14 from the First World War and 19 from the Second World War.

== Notable interred ==
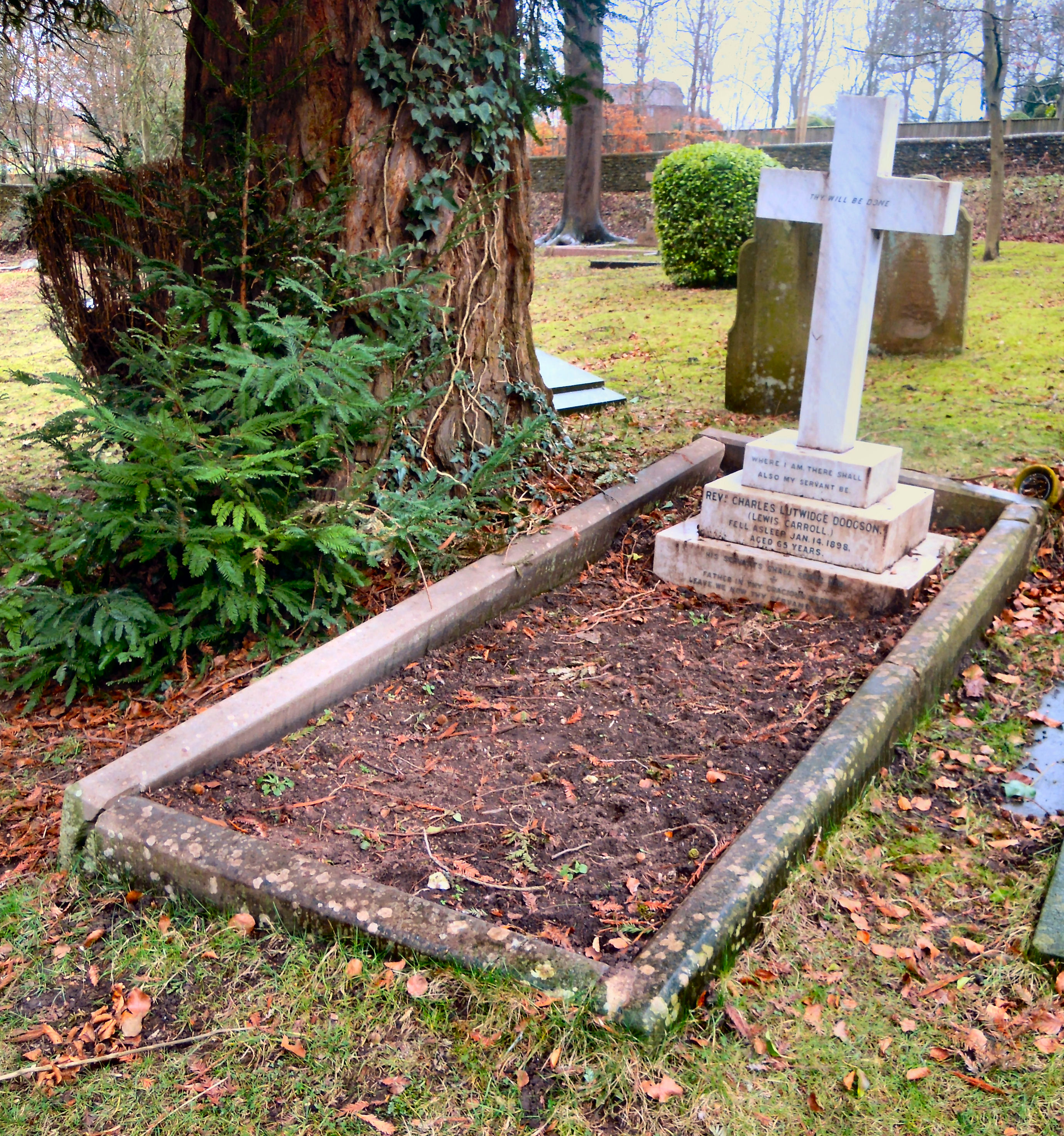
The grave of Lewis Carroll at the Mount Cemetery

- Edward Carpenter, the gay socialist poet and activist, and partner of George Merrill.
- Charles Lutwidge Dodgson ("Lewis Carroll"), the author of Alice's Adventures in Wonderland.
- Edwin Heron Dodgson, the younger brother of C. L. Dodgson, a missionary
- Five of Charles and Edwin Dodgson's seven sisters are also buried here
- Sir Alfred Gaselee, army general
- Sir John Rose, 1st Baronet, Canadian Finance Minister

== Publications ==
In 2005 Guildford Museum published ... and the Lord Taketh Away, an illustrated guide to the cemetery.

== Gallery ==
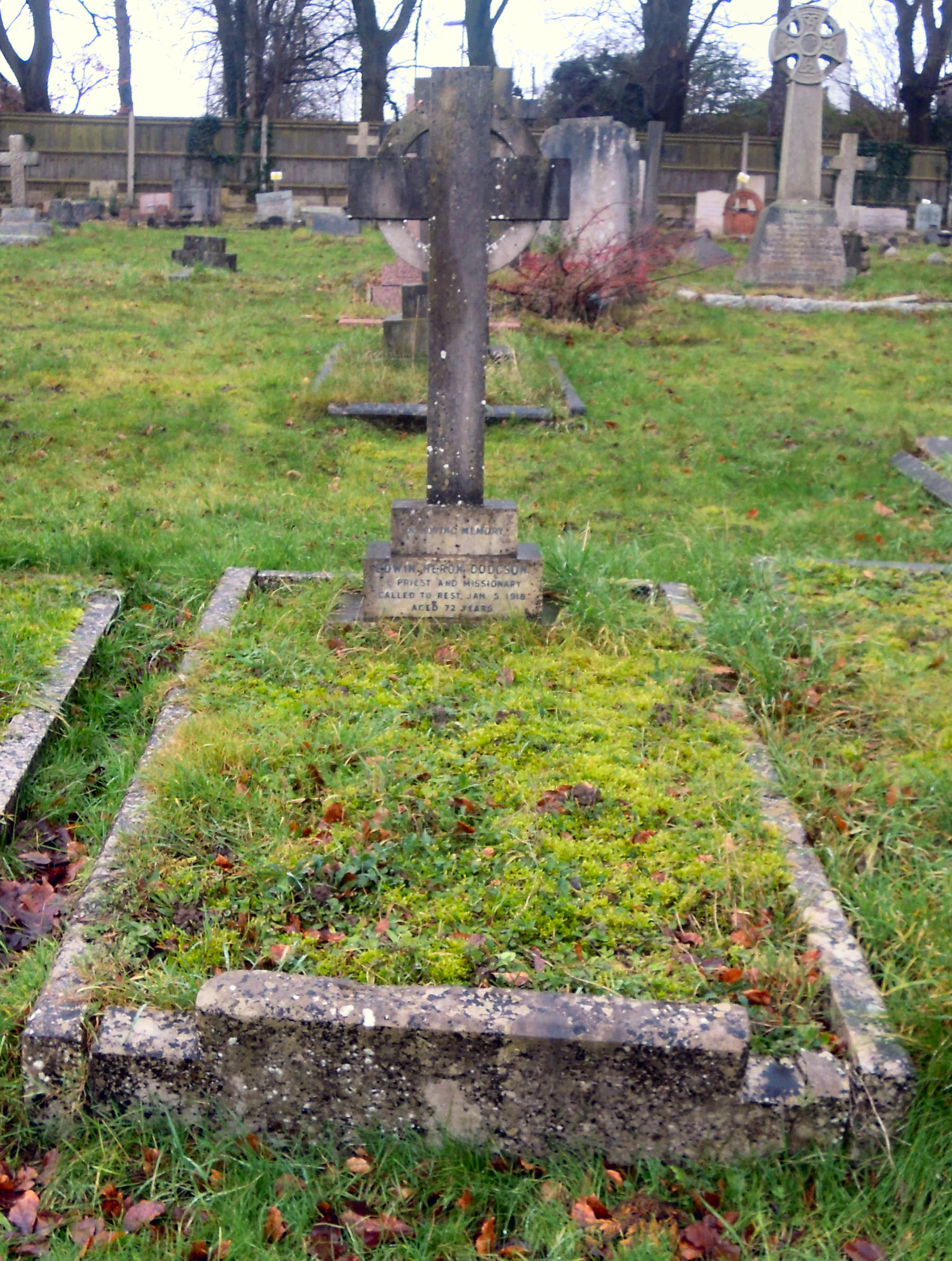
The grave of Edwin Dodgson

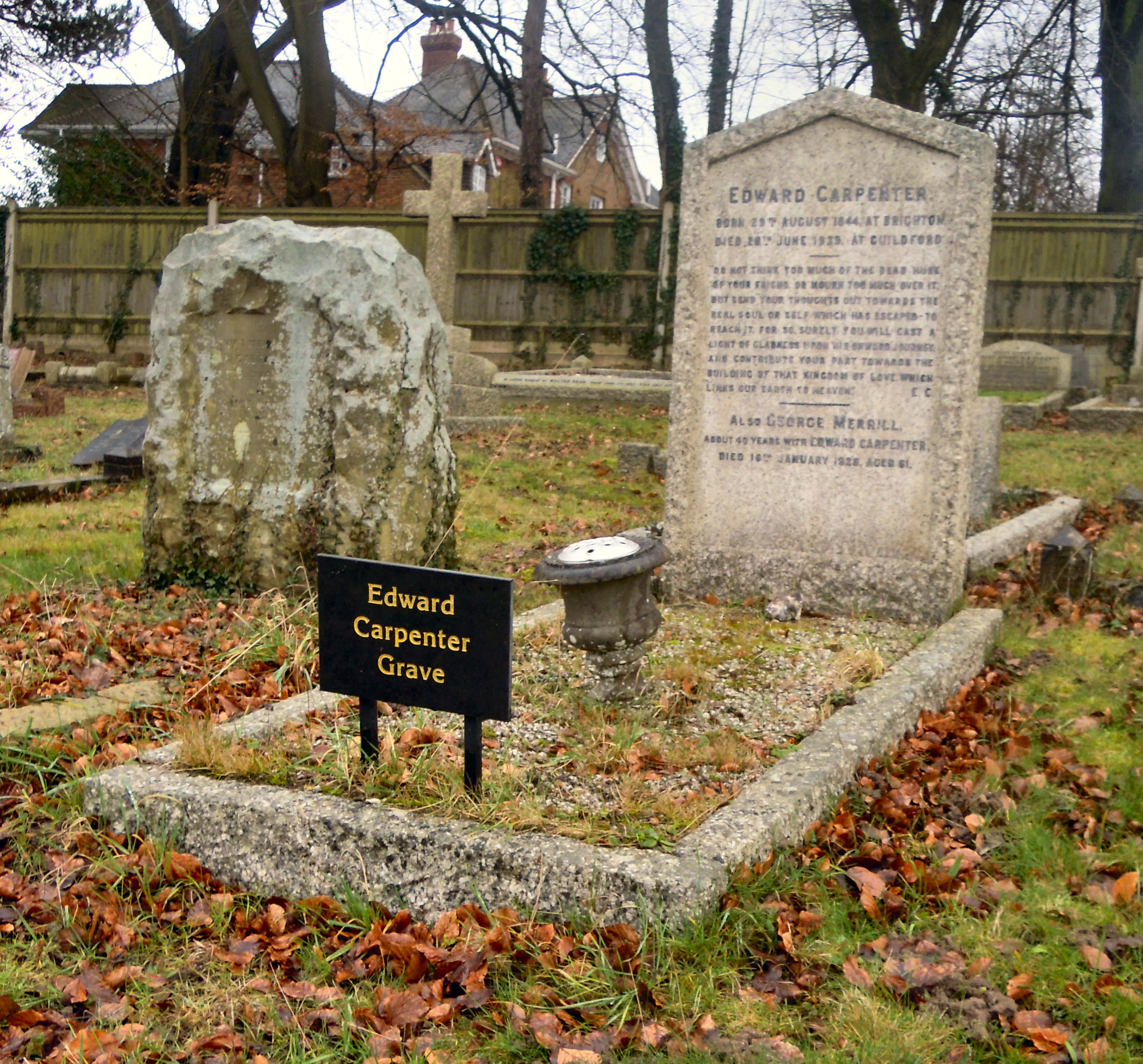
The Grave of Edward Carpenter and George Merrill

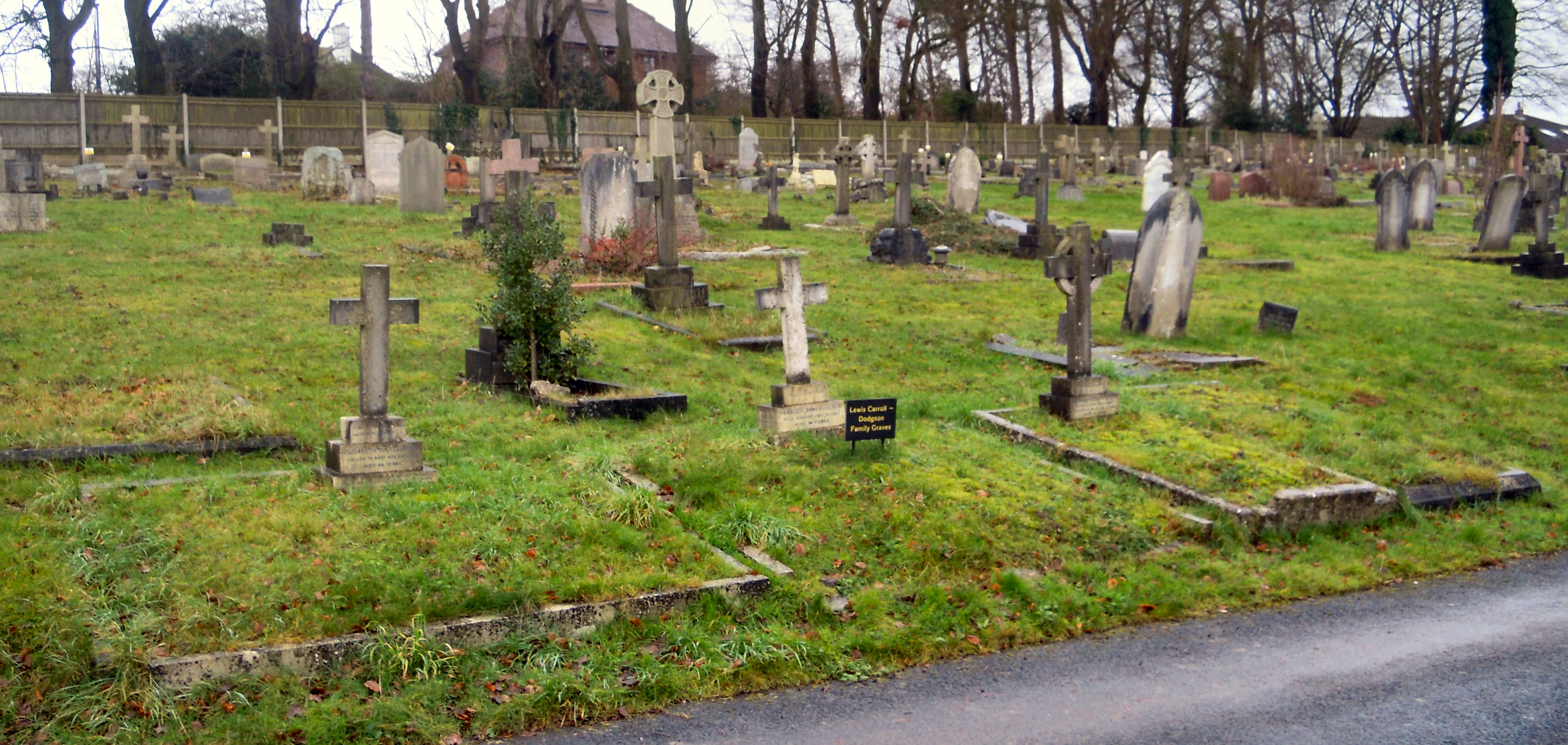
The Dodgson Family Graves
