= Alec (novel) =

2021 novel by William di Canzio

Alec: A Novel
- First edition
- Author: William di Canzio
- Publisher: Farrar, Straus and Giroux
- Publication date: July 6, 2021
- Pages: 352

Alec is the first novel by the playwright William di Canzio, published in 2021. The novel retells and continues the story of E. M. Forster's gay novel Maurice, which was first written between 1913 and 1914, revised throughout Forster's lifetime, and only published after his death in 1971. As the title suggests, Alec is told from the perspective of Alec Scudder, the working-class lover of Maurice's titular Maurice. Alexander Chee describes Alec as "the kind of novel Maurice could never be, full of sex and war, death and torture."
