= Maurice (novel) =

1971 novel by E. M. Forster

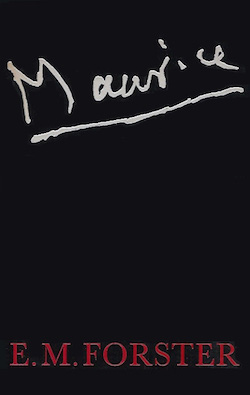
- UK first edition cover
- Author: E. M. Forster
- Language: English
- Genre: Gay novel
- Set in: England, 1909–13
- Publisher: Hodder Arnold
- Publication date: January 1971
- Publication place: United Kingdom
- Media type: Print
- Pages: 256
- ISBN: 0-713-15600-7
- Dewey Decimal: 823.912
- LC Class: PR6011 .O58 .M3

Maurice is a novel by E. M. Forster. A tale of homosexual love in early 20th-century England, it follows Maurice Hall from his schooldays through university and beyond. It was written in 1913–1914 and revised in 1932 as well as 1952–1960 (each version differs in the novel's last part). Forster was an admirer of the poet, philosopher, socialist and early gay rights activist Edward Carpenter, and following a visit to Carpenter's home at Millthorpe, Derbyshire in 1913 was inspired to write Maurice. The cross-class relationship between Carpenter and his working-class partner, George Merrill, presented a real-life model for that of Maurice and Alec Scudder.

Although Forster showed different versions of the novel to a select few of his trusted friends (among them Siegfried Sassoon, Lytton Strachey, Edward Carpenter, Christopher Isherwood, Xiao Qian, and Forrest Reid) throughout the decades, it was published only posthumously in 1971. Forster did not seek to publish it during his lifetime, believing it to have been unpublishable during that period owing to public and legal attitudes to same-sex love. A note found on the manuscript read: "Publishable, but worth it?" Forster was determined that his novel should have a happy ending, but also feared that this would make the book liable to prosecution while male homosexuality remained illegal in the UK.

There has been speculation that Forster's unpublished manuscript may have been seen by D. H. Lawrence and influenced his 1928 novel Lady Chatterley's Lover, which also involves a gamekeeper becoming the lover of a member of the upper classes.

The novel has been adapted by James Ivory and Kit Hesketh-Harvey as the 1987 Merchant Ivory Productions film Maurice; for the stage; and as a 2007 BBC Radio 4 Classic Serial by Philip Osment.

== Plot summary ==
Maurice Hall, aged fourteen, discusses sex and women with his prep school teacher Ben Ducie just before Maurice progresses to his public school. Maurice feels removed from the depiction of marriage with a woman as the goal of life.

After returning home, Maurice learns that George, the servant boy whom Maurice used to play with, had left and becomes heartbroken without knowing why. One night, Maurice dreams of a friend who could sacrifice everything for him and vice versa, a friend who would last his whole life.

Some years later, while studying at Cambridge, Maurice befriends a fellow student, Clive Durham. Clive introduces him to ancient Greek writings about same-sex love, including Plato's Symposium, and after a short time the two begin a romantic but completely non-sexual relationship—at the one-sided demand of Clive, who is a Hellenistic intellectual—which continues until they have left university.

After visiting Greece, Clive falls ill; on recovery, he ends his relationship with Maurice, professing he has become heterosexual and intends to marry a woman. Maurice is devastated, but he continues his career as a stockbroker in spite of this, spending his spare time helping to operate a Christian mission's boxing gym for working-class boys in the East End. Around the same time, Maurice realizes Clive's incompatibility with him and comes to terms with their relationship as one that would never satisfy his physical desires, and one that would end badly for both.

He makes an appointment with a hypnotist, Mr Lasker Jones, in an attempt to "cure" himself. Lasker Jones refers to his condition as "congenital homosexuality" and claims a 50 per cent success rate in curing this "condition". After the first appointment, it is clear that the hypnotism has failed.

Maurice is invited to stay with the Durhams on their estate after Clive gets married; there works a young under-gamekeeper, Alec Scudder, who becomes interested in Maurice. During his stay, Maurice also realizes he has already stopped having feelings for Clive. One night, a despairing Maurice calls out in the darkness to the "friend" from his childhood dream. Believing that Maurice is calling for him, Alec climbs to his window with a ladder and the two make love.

After their first night together, Maurice panics over giving his first time to an uneducated lower-class man and fears he will be exposed or blackmailed by Alec. He goes to Lasker Jones one more time but the hypnotism fails even more than the first time. On the way home, Maurice finally accepts himself as a homosexual but resolves to stick to his class.

Meanwhile, wounded by Maurice's refusal to answer his letters and treating him as just a servant for sexual service, Alec resorts to threatening Maurice in order to get his attention. Maurice finally agrees to meet with Alec at the British Museum in London. They discuss the situation and their respective misunderstandings, but it soon becomes clear that they are in love with each other after both have become tired of hurting each other.

They spend another night together at a hotel. In the morning Alec tells Maurice that he is emigrating to Argentina with his family. Maurice asks Alec to stay with him and indicates that he is willing to give up his social and financial position, as well as his job to live and work with Alec. Alec tells him that will not work but only ruin them both and leaves. After initial torment, Maurice decides to bid Alec farewell at Southampton. He is taken aback when Alec does not show up at the port but immediately realizes what that means.

In a hurry, Maurice makes for the Durhams' estate, where the two lovers were supposed to have met before in a boathouse at the request of Alec in his letters. There, he finds Alec, who assumes Maurice had received the telegram Alec had sent to him. Alec had changed his mind and intends to stay with Maurice, telling him that they "shan't be parted no more".

Maurice visits Clive and outlines what has happened with Alec in order to say goodbye to Clive and to his old life. Clive is left speechless and unable to comprehend. Maurice leaves to be with Alec, and Clive never sees him again.

=== Unpublished epilogue ===
In the original manuscripts, Forster wrote an epilogue concerning the post-novel fate of Maurice and Alec that he later discarded because it was unpopular among those to whom he showed it. This epilogue can still be found in the Abinger edition of the novel, which also contains a summary of the differences between various versions of the novel.

The Abinger reprint of the epilogue retains Maurice's original surname of Hill. (Although the surname had been chosen for the character before geophysicist Maurice Hill was even born, it certainly could not be retained once the latter had become a Fellow of King's College, Cambridge, Forster's own College. It might, of course, have been changed before that time.)

The epilogue contains a meeting between Maurice and his sister Kitty some years later. Alec and Maurice have by now become woodcutters. It dawns upon Kitty why her brother disappeared. This portion of the novel underlines the extreme dislike that Kitty feels for her brother. The epilogue ends with Maurice and Alec in each other's arms at the end of the day and discussing seeing Kitty and resolving that they must move on to avoid detection or a further meeting.

== Reception ==
Critical reception in 1971 was at best mixed. C. P. Snow in The Financial Times found the novel "crippled" by its "explicit purpose", with the ending "artistically quite wrong" (a near-universal criticism at the time). Walter Allen in the Daily Telegraph characterised it as "a thesis novel, a plea for public recognition of the homosexual", which Forster had "wasted" himself doing, instead of an autobiographical work. For Michael Ratcliffe in The Times, it was "the least poetic, the least witty, the least dense and the most immediately realistic of the six novels". Philip Toynbee in The Observer found the novel "deeply embarrassing" and "perfunctory to the point of painful incompetence", prompting him to question "whether there really is such a thing as a specifically homosexual sensibility". Toynbee went on to state that he could "detect nothing particularly homosexual about Maurice other than it happens to be about homosexuals".

Somewhat more positively, Paddy Kitchen in The Times Educational Supplement thought that the novel "should be taken on the terms it was conceived and not as some contender to... Howards End". In delineating "a moral theme", Forster was in Kitchen's view "the ideal person". V.S. Pritchett in The New Statesman found the character of Alec "a good deal better drawn" than Mellors in Lady Chatterley's Lover, although found the dull Maurice, shorn of Forster's "intelligence and sensibility", to be hardly believable. Cyril Connolly in The Sunday Times found "considerable irony" in the fact that it is Maurice, not Clive, the "sensitive young squire" who "turns out to be the incurable".

For George Steiner in The New Yorker, the modest achievement of Maurice served to magnify the greatness of A Passage to India:

Subtlest of all is Forster’s solution of the problem of 'physical realization.' In Maurice, this basic difficulty had lamed him. Unlike Gide or Lawrence, he had found no sensuous enactment adequate to his vision of sex. Gesture recedes in a cloying mist. The mysterious outrage in the Marabar caves is a perfect solution. Though, as the rest of the novel will show, 'nothing has happened' in that dark and echoing place, the force of sexual suggestion is uncompromising. As only a true writer can, Forster had found his way to a symbolic action richer, more precise than any single concrete occurrence.

== Adaptations ==
The novel was made into a film of the same name in 1987, directed by James Ivory and starring James Wilby as Maurice, Hugh Grant as Clive, and Rupert Graves as Alec.

A stage adaptation, written by Roger Parsley and Andy Graham, was produced by SNAP Theatre Company in 1998 and toured the UK, culminating with a brief run at London's Bloomsbury Theatre. Shameless Theatre Company staged another production in 2010 at the Above the Stag Theatre in London. Above the Stag staged it again in September/October 2018, as part of the theatre's first season in their new premises. It was directed by James Wilby. The US premiere opened on 24 February 2012 at the New Conservatory Theatre Center in San Francisco.

A retelling and continuation of the novel by William di Canzio, titled Alec, was published in 2021.

== See also ==
- Ernesto, a novel by Umberto Saba written in 1953 and published posthumously in 1975
