= George Merrill (life partner of Edward Carpenter) =

Life partner of English LGBT activist Edward Carpenter

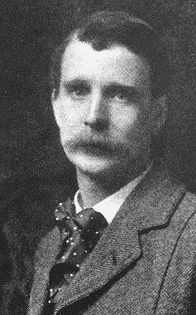
- George Merrill by Lena Connell
- Born: 16 August 1867; Sheffield, Yorkshire, England
- Died: 16 January 1928 (aged 60); Guildford, Surrey, England
- Partner: Edward Carpenter (1891–1928)

George Merrill (16 August 1867 – 16 January 1928) was the life partner of Edward Carpenter, an English utopian socialist, poet, philosopher and early activist for gay rights.

== Early life ==
George Merrill was born on 16 August 1867 in Sheffield, Yorkshire, England and grew up there in the slums. He was a working-class man who had no formal education.

== Edward Carpenter ==
George met Edward Carpenter on a train in 1891. When the head of his household, George Adams, retired in February 1898, Merrill moved in.

Carpenter owned a small holding at Millthorpe, Derbyshire,. Merrill arrived at Millthorpe that February in a blizzard, "trundling with the help of two boys all his worldly goods in a handcart over the hills, and through a disheartening blizzard of snow."

His arrival was commemorated by Carpenter in the poem "Hafiz to the Cupbearer", part of Carpenter's Towards Democracy which was published in stages between 1882 and 1902.

=== Life with Edward ===
Merrill had previously worked in a newspaper office, a hotel, and an ironworks. He was always officially Carpenter's servant, and he undertook the cooking and cleaning in the home, decorating and placing flowers in every room. Carpenter noted that "George in fact was accepted and one may say beloved by both my manual worker friends and my more aristocratic friends." He had a fine baritone voice and liked to sing comical songs.

The two lived openly as a couple for almost forty years, until Merrill's death in 1928. Carpenter died the following year and was buried beside Merrill at the Mount Cemetery in Guildford, Surrey.

== Maurice ==
The relationship between Carpenter and Merrill was the inspiration for E. M. Forster's novel Maurice which was not published until after Forster’s death. The novelist D. H. Lawrence read the manuscript prior to publication and the character of the gamekeeper Alec Scudder was in part modelled after George Merrill.

Carpenter and Merrill's rural lifestyle was another influence for Lawrence's 1928 novel Lady Chatterley's Lover. Similar to Merrill, Lady Chatterly’s Lover involves a working class gamekeeper becoming the lover of a member of the upper classes.

== Gallery ==
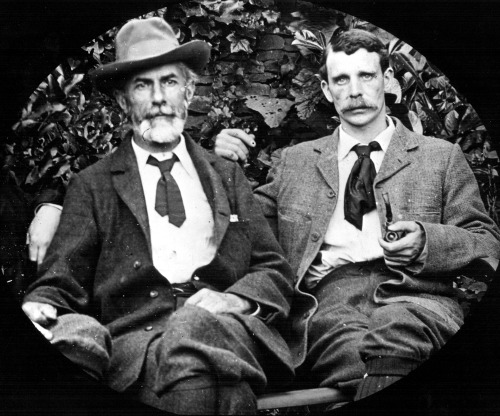
Edward Carpenter and Merrill, c. 1900.

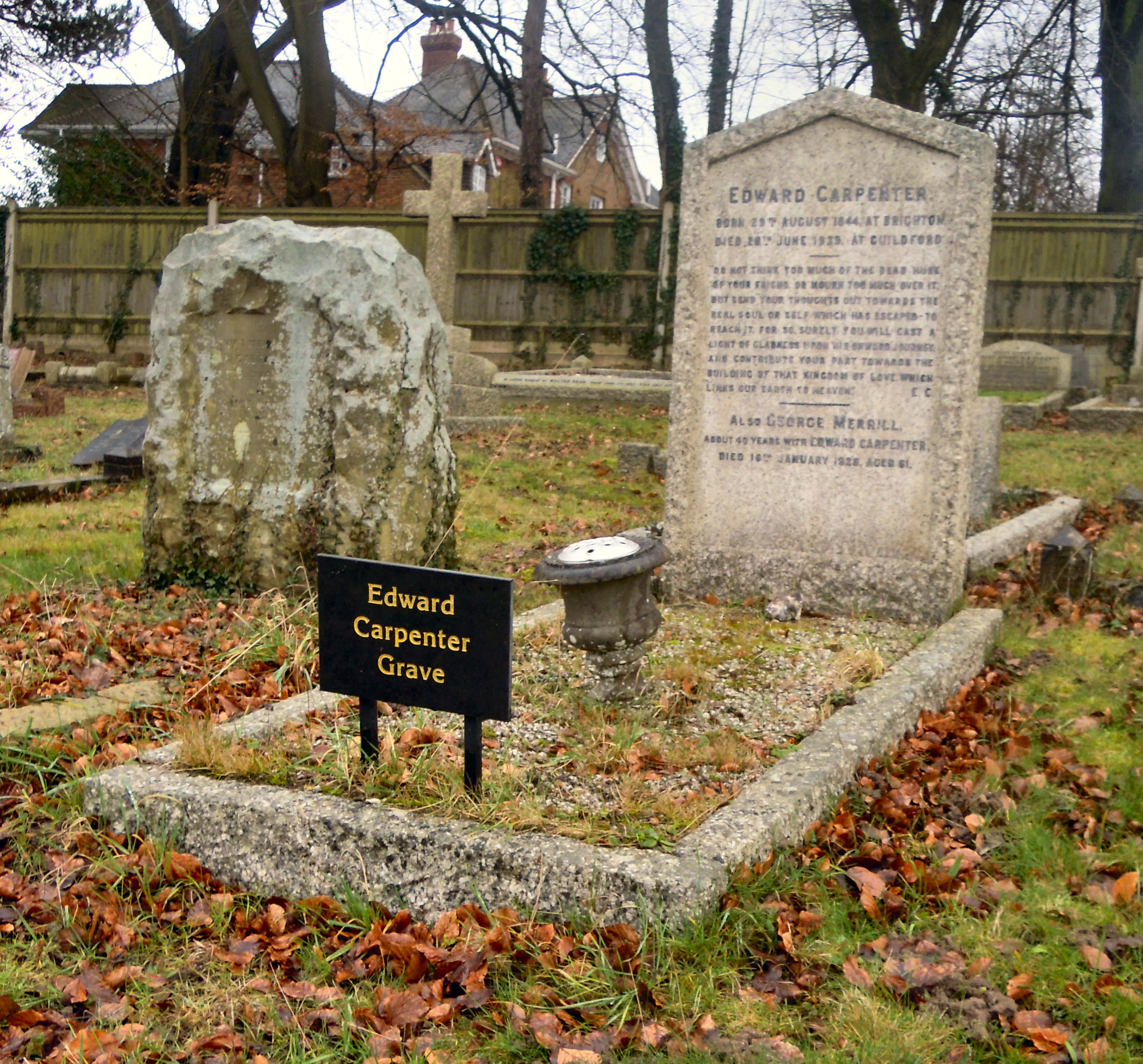
The grave of Merrill and Edward Carpenter at the Mount Cemetery, Guildford, Surrey.
