= November 1882 geomagnetic storm =

Powerful geomagnetic storm of 1882

Aurora of November 17, 1882
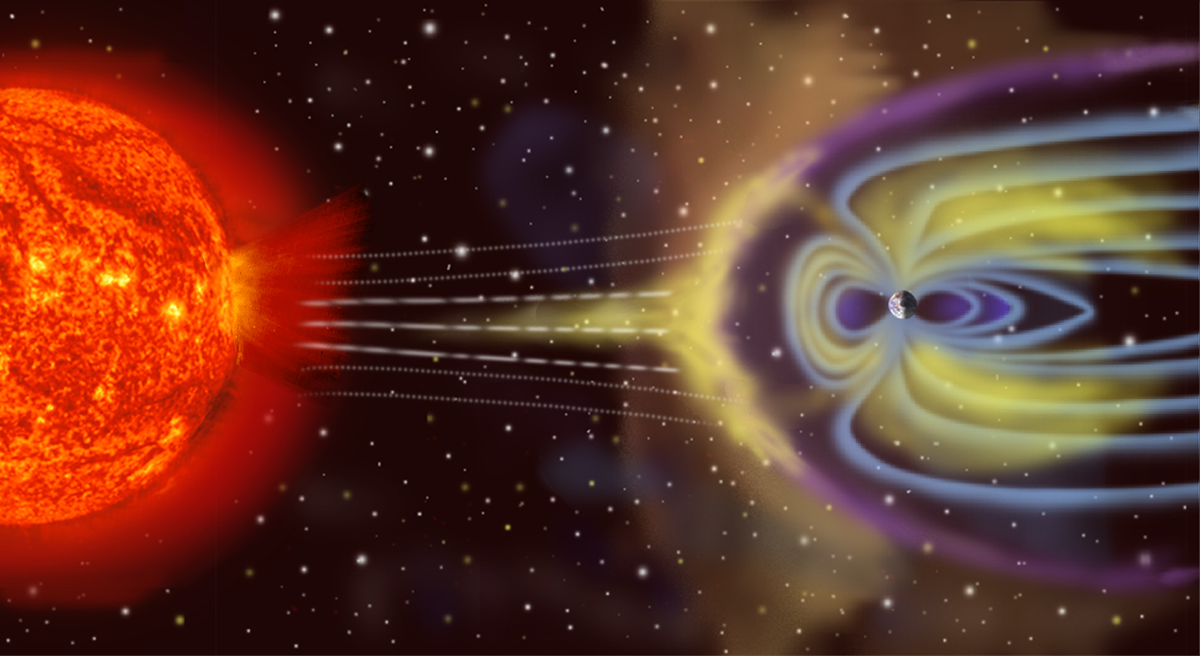
- Artist's depiction of solar wind striking Earth's magnetosphere (size and distance not to scale)

Geomagnetic storm
- Initial onset: 11 November 1882
- Dissipated: 26 November 1882
- Impacts: Electrical fires; global telegraph communications blackouts

The Aurora of November 17, 1882 was a geomagnetic storm and associated aurora event, widely reported in the media of the time. It occurred during an extended period of strong geomagnetic activity in solar cycle 12.

The event is particularly remembered in connection with an unusual phenomenon, an "auroral beam", which was observed from the Royal Observatory, Greenwich by astronomer Edward Walter Maunder and by John Rand Capron from Guildown, Surrey.

== Magnetic effects ==
The magnetic storm that caused the brilliant auroral display of November 1882 was reported in The New York Times and other newspapers as having an effect on telegraph systems, which were rendered useless in some cases. The Savannah Morning News reported that "the switchboard at the Chicago Western Union office was set on fire several times, and much damage to equipment was done. From Milwaukee, the 'volunteer electric current' was at one time strong enough to light up an electric lamp". Measurements taken in the United Kingdom, where the telegraph also was affected, indicated that a telluric current five times stronger than normal was present.

== Aurorae ==
=== Polar observations ===
During the event, bright auroral phenomena were recorded from across the world, including several observations from polar latitudes, thanks to the event occurring during the First International Polar Year. In one case, two members of the ill-fated Lady Franklin Bay Expedition, including the astronomer, Edward Israel, while observing at Fort Conger near the north magnetic pole, instinctively ducked to avoid an aurora described as "as bright as the full moon".

=== Observations in the United States ===
The Philadelphia Inquirer of November 18 reported a "brilliance as bright as daylight" at Cheyenne, and a "blood red" sky at St Paul. In a 1917 paper for the National Academy of Sciences, the electrical engineer, Elihu Thomson, described seeing "colored streamers passing upward from all around towards the zenith from north, east, west and south", with "great masses or broad bands to the east and west".

=== Capron's beam ===
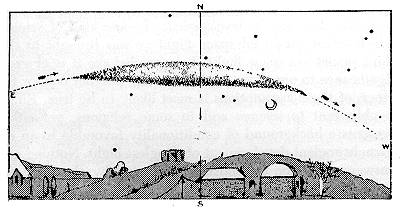
Strange phenomenon on November 17, 1882, observed and described by Edward Walter Maunder in The Observatory, June 1883 (pp. 192–193) and April 1916 (pp. 213–215), which he termed "a strange celestial visitor," the drawing above is by astronomer and aurora expert, John Rand Capron of Guildown Observatory, Surrey, United Kingdom, who also observed it and the crescent moon is represented below it to the right: Philosophical Magazine, May 1883

The most unusual phenomenon of the auroral storm, witnessed from Europe at approximately 6 p.m. on November 17, was described in detail in various ways, including as a "beam", "spindle", "definite body" with a "Zeppelin"-like shape and pale green colour, passing from horizon to horizon above the Moon. The phenomenon, which transited the sky in approximately seventy-five seconds, was witnessed and documented by the amateur scientist and astronomer, John Rand Capron, at Guildown, Surrey. Capron made a drawing of what he referred to as the "auroral beam"; it subsequently was published along with an article in the Philosophical Magazine. In the article, Capron collected twenty-six separate accounts, of which the majority came from the United Kingdom: these included reports of the object's torpedo-shaped appearance and an apparent dark nucleus. Several of Capron's correspondents speculated that the phenomenon might have been a meteor, but Capron (and Maunder, who wrote a note in The Observatory on Capron's study) thought it could have represented a transient illumination of an otherwise invisible auroral arc.

The writer, Charles Hoy Fort, later referred to this incident in his book The Book of the Damned, in which he collected further reports from various articles (including several in the journal Nature) published both at the time and subsequently:

In the London Times, Nov. 20, 1882, the Editor says that he had received a great number of letters upon this phenomenon. He publishes two. One correspondent describes it as "well-defined and shaped like a fish … extraordinary and alarming." The other correspondent writes of it as "a most magnificent luminous mass, shaped somewhat like a torpedo."

Although Fort suggested the event had supernatural overtones, scientific opinion was that the "beam" likely represented an extremely unusual auroral phenomenon.

Maunder commented:

This "torpedo-shaped" beam of light was quite unlike any other celestial object that I have ever seen. The quality of its light, and its occurrence while a great magnetic storm and a bright aurora were in progress, seem to establish its auroral origin. But it differed very widely in appearance from any other aurora that I have ever seen.

== Solar phenomena ==
In a 1904 article, Maunder was to describe the storm as a "very intense and long-continued disturbance", which in total, lasted between November 11 and 26. He pointed out that this synchronised "with the entire passage across the visible disc" of sunspot group 885 (Greenwich numbering). This group originally had formed on the disc on October 20, passed off at the west limb on October 28, passed again east–west between November 12–25, and returned at the east limb on December 10, before finally disappearing on the disc on December 20.

The association of the November 1882 sunspot, or group of sunspots, with the strong auroral display, the collapse of the telegraph system, and variations in the magnetic readings taken at Greenwich was to prompt Maunder to pursue further research of the link between sunspots and magnetic phenomena.

== See also ==
- List of solar storms
