= George Luck =

British Army officer (1840–1916)

General Sir George Luck GCB
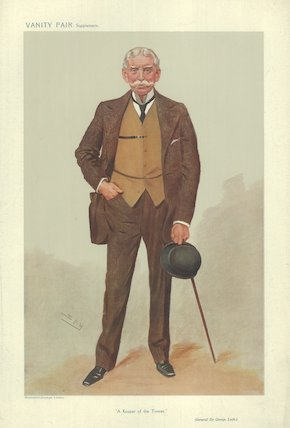
- Born: 24 October 1840; Blackheath, Kent, England
- Died: 10 December 1916 (aged 76) Salisbury, Wiltshire, England
- Allegiance: United Kingdom
- Branch: British Army
- Rank: General
- Commands: Bengal Command
- Conflicts: Second Anglo-Afghan War
- Awards: Knight Grand Cross of the Order of the Bath

General Sir George Luck, GCB (24 October 1840 – 10 December 1916) was a British Army officer.

== Military career ==
Luck was commissioned into the 15th Regiment of Foot in 1858. He commanded the 15th Hussars during the Second Anglo-Afghan War between 1878 and 1880. He became Inspector-General of Cavalry in India in 1887, and Inspector-General of Cavalry in the UK in 1893. Returning to India in 1898, he was appointed Commander-in-Chief of the Bengal Command. In early November 1902 he left India on eight months′ sick leave, at the end of which he retired from the army in 1903.

He was given the colonelcy of the 15th (The King's) Hussars in 1904, a position he held until his death in 1916. He was promoted full general on 23 May 1906.

In retirement he lived at Landford Lodge near Salisbury, Wiltshire and was appointed Lieutenant of the Tower (1905–07).

He married Ellen Georgina Adams; they had no children.

Military offices
Preceded by Sir Baker Russell	C-in-C, Bengal Command; 1898 – 1903	Succeeded by Sir Alfred Gaselee
