= Sheffield Socialist Society =

Late 19th century British socialist organisation

- Formation: 1886
- Founder: Edward Carpenter
- Headquarters: Solly Street, Sheffield (initially); Scotland Street, Sheffield
- Key people: Raymond Unwin; John O'Dwyer Creaghe

The Sheffield Socialist Society was an early revolutionary socialist organisation in Sheffield, England.

The Society was founded in 1886 on the initiative of Edward Carpenter. Carpenter was influenced by Henry Hyndman's book England for All, and struck up a friendship with William Morris. Carpenter originally intended the Society to become the first regional branch of the Social Democratic Federation (SDF), but this idea was abandoned when the Socialist League, led by Morris, split from the SDF, and the Society remained unaffiliated to any national current.

Financed largely by Carpenter, the Society opened a building on Solly Street containing a low-cost café, lodgings and meeting room; it moved the following year to Scotland Street. The Society began organising stalls on Fargate, with speakers extolling the virtues of socialism, and organised meetings with a wide range of speakers, including Hyndman, Morris, Annie Besant and Peter Kropotkin. The Society grew, with new members including Raymond Unwin and John O'Dwyer Creaghe.

Regular disturbances forced the Society to close its café, after which it launched a successful campaign to increase the relief paid by the Poor Law Commissioners. The Society then instituted a campaign against high rents, encouraging non-payment as a protest action. However, by following this policy, the Society members lost their own building, and a decline set in as the group failed to respond to rising trade union militancy.

The Society remained open to all revolutionary socialists, and soon a split emerged between the Carpenter-led proponents of non-violence, and an opposing faction of anarchists. In 1891, the anarchists split from the Society, organising around the publication The Sheffield Anarchist. Carpenter drifted away from the surviving group, which maintained its activity at a lower level. In 1902, some members left to create a branch of the SDF.
