= The Intermediate Sex =

1908 work on homosexuality by Edward Carpenter

The Intermediate Sex: A Study of Some Transitional Types of Men and Women
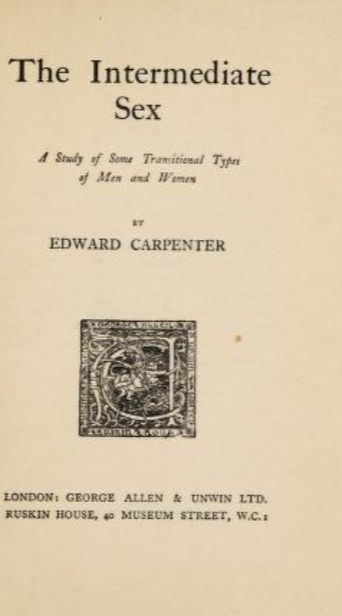
- Title page for The Intermediate Sex: A Study of Some Transitional Types of Men and Women (1908)
- Author: Edward Carpenter
- Publication date: 1908

The Intermediate Sex (full title: The Intermediate Sex: A Study of Some Transitional Types of Men and Women) was a 1908 work by Edward Carpenter expressing his views on homosexuality. Carpenter argues that "uranism", as he terms homosexuality, was on the increase, marking a new age of sexual liberation. The work was an influence on Robert Graves and Siegfried Sassoon, both young war-poets and officers in British trenches when they met.
