= Booker's Tower =

19th-century tower in Guildford, England

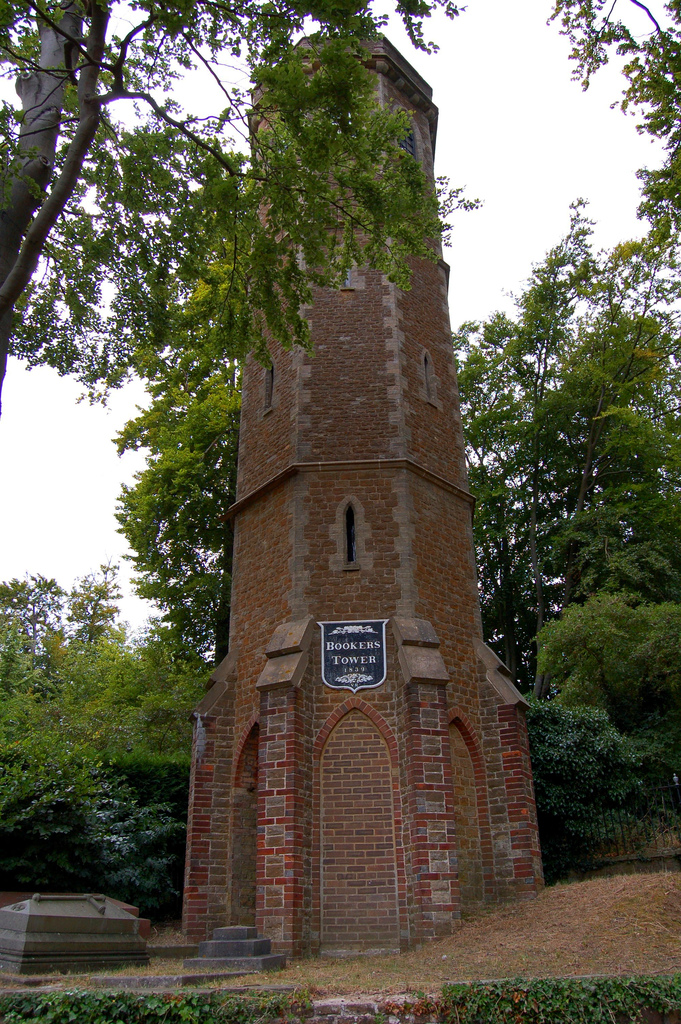

- Location within Surrey
- 51°13′48″N 0°34′52″W
- Type: Tower
- Location: The Mount, Guildford
- OS grid reference: SU 99141 48839

History
- Built: 1839

Site notes
- Area: Surrey
- Architectural style: Gothic
- Owner: Guildford Borough Council

Listed Building – Grade II
- Official name: Bookers Tower Guildford
- Designated: 15 March 1988
- Reference no.: 1188100

Bookers Tower (also Booker's Tower) is a Grade II-listed four-storey octagonal tower built in the 19th century, in the Gothic style. It is in Guildford, Surrey, to the west of the town centre on Beech Lane. It is adjacent to the Mount Cemetery, the resting place of Lewis Carroll.

== History ==
Built on high ground to the west of Guildford town centre, it was commissioned by the then Mayor of Guildford, Charles Booker in memory of his sons, Charles and Henry, who had both died at the age of 15. The structure was completed in 1839 and was constructed by a local builder, John Mason, in Bargate stone with ashlar and brick dressings.

At the opening celebration in 1840, the tower was dedicated to mark the marriage of Queen Victoria to Prince Albert. The ceremony involved the ringing of bells and the lighting of cannons and fireworks. Booker subsequently entertained friends at the tower and invited guests to view the construction of the railway lines to Woking and Guildford from the top.

In later years Bookers Tower was used by the Victorian scientist and Guildford resident, John Rand Capron, to observe astronomical phenomena. He is also thought to have conducted experiments involving lightning at the site.

Guildford Borough Council considered demolishing the tower in 1927, but repairs were carried out in 1928, supervised by the Borough Surveyor, J. W. Hipwood. During the Second World War, it was used as an air raid observation post. Two further restoration projects were carried out in 1984 and 2014. The tower is not open to the public.

== See also ==
- Camberley Obelisk - ruined tower in northwest Surrey, built c. 1765 – c. 1770
