= Alfred Gaselee =

British Indian Army general (1844–1918)

General Sir Alfred Gaselee GCB GCIE
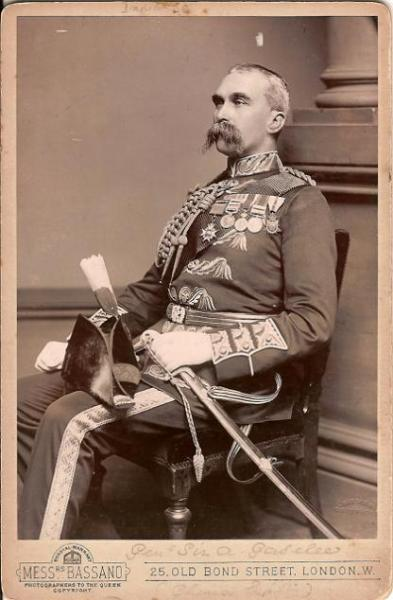
- Born: 3 June 1844
- Died: 29 March 1918 (aged 73)
- Military career
- Allegiance: United Kingdom; British India
- Branch: British Army; British Indian Army
- Service years: 1863–1908
- Rank: General
- Commands: 1st Bn 5th Gurkha Rifles; Northern Army, India
- Conflicts: Second Anglo-Afghan War; Boxer Uprising
- Awards: Knight Grand Cross of the Order of the Bath; Knight Grand Cross of the Order of the Indian Empire

General Sir Alfred Gaselee, GCB, GCIE (3 June 1844 – 29 March 1918) was a soldier who served in the British Indian Army.

== Early life ==
Gaselee was born at Little Yeldham, Essex, the eldest son of the Reverend John Gaselee, rector of Little Yeldham, and his wife, Sarah Anne Mant. He entered Felsted School in 1853 and the Royal Military College, Sandhurst, in 1861.

== Career ==
Gaselee was commissioned as an ensign into the 93rd regiment (later the Sutherland Highlanders) on 9 January 1863. He was involved in the campaign on the North-West Frontier of India in that year. He was promoted lieutenant on 11 October 1866, transferred to the Bengal staff corps, and joined the 4th Punjab infantry on 27 September 1867.

Gaselee went with the Indian force to Abyssinia, where he acted as assistant to the director-general of transport and was present at the capture of Magdala (13 April 1868). He was promoted captain on 9 January 1875, and served with the Jowaki expedition of 1877–8.

In the Second Anglo-Afghan War, Gaselee was a deputy assistant quartermaster-general, and accompanied Lord Roberts on the march from Kabul to the relief of Kandahar. He was made a brevetted major on 2 March 1881.

Gaselee was promoted to major on 9 January 1883, and lieutenant-colonel on 9 January 1889, and was made a Companion of the Order of the Bath (CB) on 19 November 1891. On 27 September 1892, he was promoted to the command of the 1st battalion, 5th Gurkha Rifles. On 1 February 1893, he was promoted to colonel and appointed aide-de-camp to Queen Victoria. He served in the Isazai expedition (1892), the Waziristan field force (1894–5), and the Tirah campaign (1897–8). For his services in Tirah, Gaselee was created a Knight Commander of the Order of the Bath (KCB) on 20 May 1898. From 25 July 1898 to 3 June 1901, he served simultaneously as quartermaster-general of the Army in India and brigadier-general commanding Bundelkhand district.

== Boxer Uprising ==
In the summer of 1900, when the Boxer Uprising in China was at its height, Gaselee was chosen to command the British element in the international expeditionary force, and on 3 July 1900 promoted to major-general. Gaselee was nominally put in charge of the Gaselee Expedition because the Eight-Nation Alliance refused to the allow the Japanese general Yamaguchi Motomi to lead it, even though he was the highest-ranking officer present. As a reward for his services, he was created Knight Grand Commander of the Order of the Indian Empire (GCIE) on 24 July 1901.

== Later career ==
Gaselee was appointed to command the Lucknow district in Bengal in April 1901, but was granted an extended leave of office after his return home from China and did not take up the position until late 1902. He was promoted lieutenant-general on 30 June 1903 on appointment as General Sir George Luck's successor as Commander-in-Chief Bengal Command and to full general on 30 June 1906. He became General Officer Commanding-in-Chief of the Northern Army in India in 1907. He retired in November 1908 and, having been created a Knight Grand Cross of the Order of the Bath (GCB) on 25 June 1909, he died at his residence in Guildford on 29 March 1918. He was buried at Mount Cemetery.

== Family ==
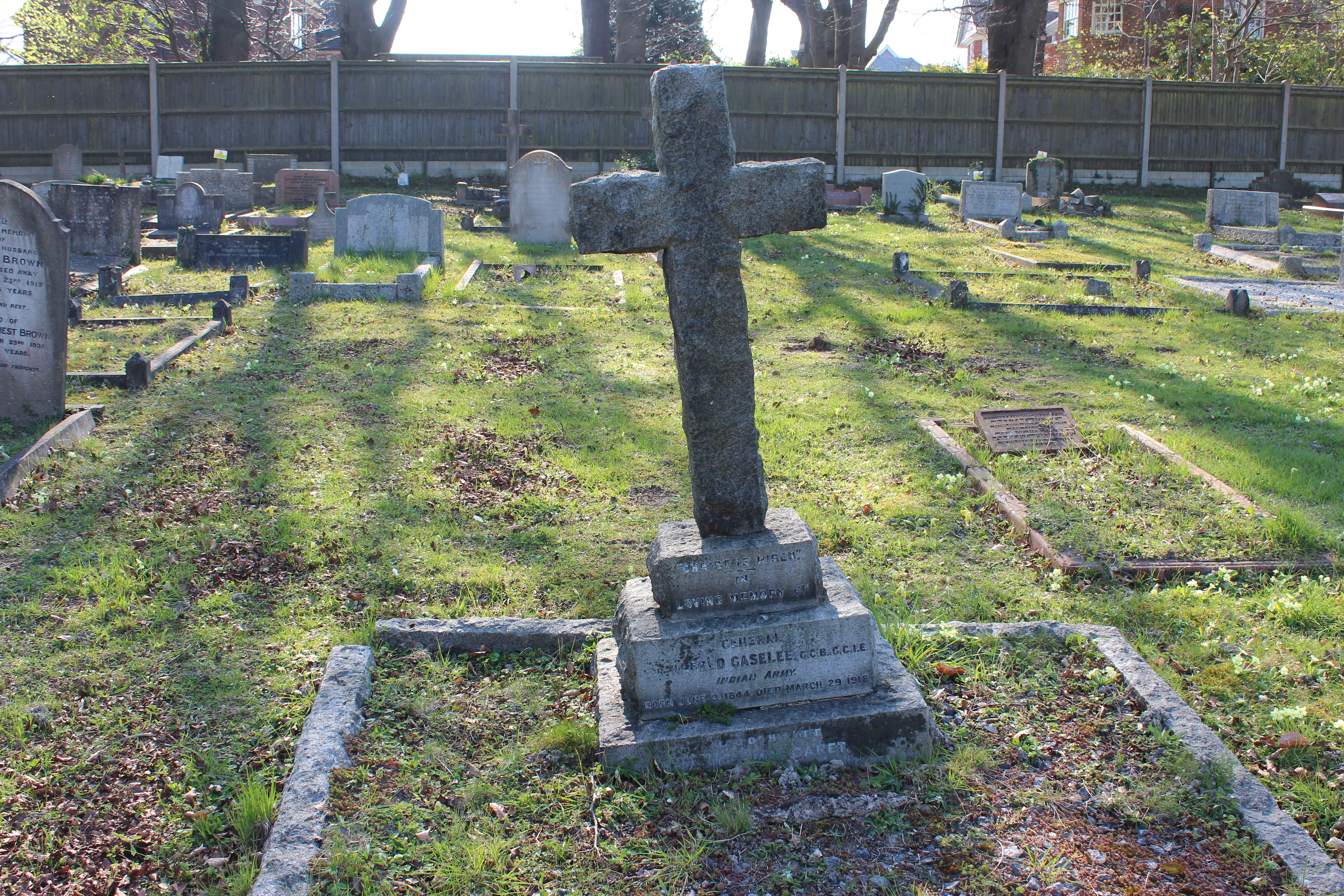
Grave at Mount Cemetery in Guildford

On 20 August 1895 he married secondly Alice Margaret, daughter of Gartside Gartside-Tipping of Rossferry, County Fermanagh, Ireland, who outlived him.

== Notes ==
Military offices
Preceded by Sir George Luck	C-in-C, Bengal Command; 1903–1907	Succeeded by Command disbanded
Preceded by Sir Bindon Blood	GOC-in-C, Northern Army, India; 1907–1908	Succeeded by Sir Josceline Wodehouse
