= William Harrison Riley =

William Harrison Riley (c.1835–1907) was an early British socialist.

Riley was born in Manchester, his father being the manager of a cloth printing factory and Methodist preacher. He trained as an engraver before moving to the United States for three years, then returned to England to work as a commercial traveller.

In the late 1860s, Riley returned to the U.S., where he became an active socialist and gained experience as a journalist. In 1870, he returned to England once more, and got in touch with Karl Marx and Friedrich Engels. He settled in London, where he published Yankee Letters to British Workmen in 1871, and became active in the First International, editing its British journal, the International Herald, from 1872. By 1875, he had moved to Bristol, then in 1876 he moved to Sheffield on the invitation of John Ruskin to manage St George's Farm at Totley on a communitarian basis. In Sheffield, he launched a monthly journal, The Socialist, which ran for only six months.

The farm project was not a success; the workers, former shoemakers, fell into dispute with each other and with Riley, and the land was not as productive as had been hoped. With the failure of the project, Ruskin permitted Riley to remain at the farm, but in 1880 Riley moved back to the U.S., where he based himself in Massachusetts, writing socialist articles and farming. In 1884, Edward Carpenter stayed with Riley while he was visiting Walt Whitman. In 1889, he moved to Lunenburg, Massachusetts, where he lived until 1896.
