= James Carpenter (Royal Navy officer) =

British Royal Navy admiral

Admiral James Carpenter
- Born: 1760
- Died: 16 March 1845 (aged 84–85)
- Occupation: Royal Navy admiral

James Carpenter (1760 – 16 March 1845) was a British Royal Navy admiral.

== Biography ==
Carpenter entered the navy in 1776 on board HMS Foudroyant, then commanded by Captain Jervis, afterwards Earl St. Vincent. From the Foudroyant he was sent in the following year to North America in the frigate HMS Diamond, and from her was transferred to HMS Sultan, in which he was present at the Battle of Grenada, 6 July 1779. In 1780 he was for some time in HMS Sandwich, bearing Sir George Rodney's flag, and was appointed from her to HMS Intrepid as acting lieutenant, in which capacity he was present in the action off Martinique, 30 April 1781, and in that off the Capes of Virginia, 5 September 1781. He was not confirmed in his rank till 18 April 1782. In 1793 he was appointed to the Boyne, flagship of Sir John Jervis in the West Indies, and was promoted by the admiral to the command of HMS Nautilus, 9 January 1794. He was then employed on shore at the reduction of Martinique, and on 25 March 1794 was posted to the command of the Bienvenu, prize-frigate, from which he was moved in rapid succession to the Veteran of 64 guns and the Alarm of 32. He continued actively employed in the West Indies till the following year, when he returned to England. In 1799 he was appointed to the Leviathan of 74 guns, bearing Sir John Duckworth's flag in the Mediterranean and afterwards in the West Indies, whence he was compelled to invalid; and, taking a passage home in a merchant ship, he was captured by a French man-of-war and carried to Spain as a prisoner. He was, however, shortly afterwards exchanged through the exertions of Lord St. Vincent, and for a short time had command of the San Josef. From 1803 to 1810 he had charge of the Devonshire Sea Fencibles, and in 1811 went out to Newfoundland in the Antelope, again as flag-captain to Sir J. T. Duckworth. It was only for a year, for on 12 August 1812 he became a rear-admiral. He had no further service, but was advanced in course of seniority to be vice-admiral on 12 August 1819, and admiral on 10 January 1837. He died on 16 March 1845.
