= Sam Mainwaring =

Welsh political activist (1841–1907)

- Born: Samuel Mainwaring; 15 December 1841; Penrhiwtyn, Neath, Wales
- Died: 29 September 1907 (aged 65); London, England
- Occupation: Machinist

Samuel Mainwaring (15 December 1841 – 29 September 1907) was a Welsh machinist and socialist political activist who was a founding member and key leader of the Socialist League, one of the first socialist political parties in Britain. In his later years, he turned from Marxist socialism to the libertarian socialist doctrine of anarcho-communism. He is best remembered as the father of the term "anarcho-syndicalism".

== Biography ==
=== Early years ===
Known to his contemporaries as Sam, Mainwaring was born 15 December 1841 in Penrhiwtyn, Neath, Wales. He was a native speaker of Welsh and retained an affinity for the tongue throughout his life. Mainwaring was raised by his family as a Unitarian. He developed into a quiet yet persuasive public speaker and a tireless worker for activities which he believed important. In 1868, he married the daughter of a customs officer from Cardiff.

Mainwaring worked as an engineer, moving to the United States for a short period of time before returning to the United Kingdom to work in London, where he was a member of the Amalgamated Engineering Union.

=== Political career ===
Late in the 1870s, Mainwaring joined the East London Labour Emancipation League and was an early member of the Social Democratic Federation. However, this group proved to be a disappointment, failing to garner support of an appreciable section of the working class and was believed by many members to be overly dominated by the intellectual pretensions and nationalist political views of its patriarch and patron, Henry Hyndman.

In 1885, there came a split in which Mainwaring joined with Eleanor Marx, Ernest Belfort Bax and his friend William Morris in forming the Socialist League. Over time, Mainwaring's views gradually evolved from revolutionary socialism to those of anarcho-communism.

In 1891, Mainwaring moved to Swansea and there started the Swansea Socialist Society. He became associated with the fledgling anarchist newspaper Liberty, edited by James Tochatti, formerly of the Hammersmith branch of the Socialist League.

In 1900, he played an active role in the movement opposing the Boer War.

In September 1903 and March 1904, Mainwaring published two issues of a short-lived newspaper called The General Strike, a publication which made detailed criticisms of the "officialism" of union bureaucracy and which publicised strikes in Europe making use of syndicalist tactics.

=== Death ===
In his later years, Mainwaring lived in London. On Sunday, 29 September 1907, while addressing a meeting on Parliament Hill Fields, Mainwaring was stricken by faintness and subsequently died. He was 65 years old at the time of his death.

== Legacy ==
Mainwaring is credited with coining the phrase "anarcho-syndicalism" and it is for this he is best remembered.

Mainwaring was cited as a major intellectual inspiration by the radical British labour leader Tom Mann. In his 1923 memoirs, Mann credited Mainwaring with having been "one of the very first to understand the significance of the revolutionary movement, and the first, as far as my knowledge goes, to appreciate industrial action as distinct from parliamentary action". Mann had met Mainwaring when the latter was a foreman of a shop which employed him.

Mainwaring was the namesake of a nephew whom he adopted, Sam Mainwaring Jr., himself an important radical activist in the international labour movement.
