= W. J. Nairn =

William J. Nairn (1856–1902) was a Scottish socialist activist, the most prominent Scottish Marxist in the late 1890s.

Nairn worked as a stonebreaker and educated himself. He was a founder member of the Glasgow branch of the Social Democratic Federation (SDF), and served on the national executive of the SDF in 1895, 1896, 1898 and 1899. During this period, he wrote for Justice under the pseudonym "Sandy McFarlane".

In his spare time, Nairn supported the co-operative movement and the temperance movement.

Nairn died of pneumonia early in 1902.
