= Charles Fitzgerald (disambiguation) =

Charles Fitzgerald (1791–1887) was governor of the Gambia and Western Australia.

Charles Fitzgerald may also refer to:

- Charles FitzGerald, 1st Baron Lecale (1756–1810), Irish peer and politician
- Charles FitzGerald, 4th Duke of Leinster (1819–1887), Irish duke and politician
- Charles Cooper Penrose-Fitzgerald (1841–1921), British naval officer
- Charles Fitzgerald (rugby, born 1899) (1899–1961), New Zealand rugby union and rugby league footballer
- Charles Fitzgerald (rugby union, born 1879) (1879–1958), Irish rugby union player
- C. L. Fitzgerald (Charles L. Fitzgerald, 1836–?), British socialist activist and journalist
- C. P. Fitzgerald (Charles Patrick Fitzgerald, 1902–1992), British-born Australian academic
- Charles Borromeo Fitzgerald (1865–1907), barrister and politician from Queensland, Australia
