= C. L. Fitzgerald =

British activist and journalist

Charles L. Fitzgerald (born 1836) was a British socialist activist and journalist.

Fitzgerald was commissioned in the West India Regiment, and served in India from 1855 until 1857, the period leading up to the Indian Rebellion.

In the 1880s, Fitzgerald was an early member of the Democratic Federation, serving as its assistant secretary, then after it became the Social Democratic Federation (SDF), he was appointed as the first editor of its newspaper, Justice; however, after a few weeks, party leader H. M. Hyndman replaced him. Fitzgerald also served briefly as secretary of the SDF, but after a scandal in which Hyndman secretly accepted money from a Conservative Party agent to stand candidates in the 1885 general election, he resigned from the group.

Fitzgerald worked with James MacDonald to form the Socialist Union, but it made little impact and dissolved two years later. He then disappeared from the socialist movement. Ernest Belfort Bax claimed that he went to the Balkans as a journalist and was murdered by agents of the Ottoman Empire. However, H. W. Lee claimed that he emigrated to the Western United States in the early 1890s and lived there until his death in about 1930.

Media offices
Preceded by New position	Editor of Justice; 1884	Succeeded by H. M. Hyndman
