= Rose Jarvis =

British politician (1857–1923)

Amy Rose Jarvis (1857–1923) was a British socialist politician.

Rose's father John Bigwood was a Baptist minister. She was born in 1857 in Brompton (1871 census, Harrow) and was educated at home. She began working in the Temperance movement, and advocating Christianity. While living in Tunbridge Wells, she became alarmed at the poor sanitary condition of many rented properties, and wrote about this in the local newspaper. Although threatened with a libel action, she continued her campaign, and took a university extension class in politics to gain knowledge. While attending it, she became aware of the Social Democratic Federation (SDF), and she soon joined the party.

Rose married Tom Jarvis, also an SDF member, but he was in increasingly poor health. She looked after him, while maintaining her political activism. She stood for the London School Board in Hackney in 1894, stood unsuccessfully for the SDF executive in 1895, and attended the 1896 Congress of the Second International in London.

Tom died in 1903, and Rose settled in Croydon, winning election as a Poor Law Guardian the following year. However, she met Charles J. Scott, an SDF member living in Northampton, and relocated there early in 1906. She won election to the town's Board of Guardians in May, and in 1920 was the first woman elected to Northampton Town Council. She died unexpectedly in 1923.
