= Arthur Whiting =

British politician

Arthur Whiting (1878 – 16 August 1938) was a British politician.

Born in Burnham-on-Crouch, in Essex, Whiting moved with his parents to Southend-on-Sea when he was three years old. He left school at the age of twelve, working as a brickmaker in the summer, and as a general labourer in the winter. Six years later, he moved to Barking and found work at the Beckton Gas Works, where he joined the National Union of Gas Workers and General Labourers, working for the union as a full-time organiser from 1917.

Inspired by Will Thorne, leader of the union, Whiting joined the Social Democratic Federation in his youth, and then its successor, the British Socialist Party (BSP). He first won election to Barking Urban District Council in 1909. One of the minority in the BSP who supported World War I, he joined the National Socialist Party (NSP) split in 1916, and served on its first provisional committee. He also served two terms as chair of the Urban District Council.

The NSP adopted Whiting as its candidate in Romford at the 1918 UK general election. Although the NSP was affiliated to the Labour Party, Whiting failed to be selected as the Labour candidate, and he came last in a three-way race. For the 1922 UK general election, he was selected as the Labour Party candidate for Great Yarmouth, where he lost his deposit.

The Gas Workers became part of the National Union of General and Municipal Workers, and Whiting remained an organiser for the union. Barking became a Municipal Borough in 1931, and Whiting served as Mayor of Barking in 1934/35. For the 1935 UK general election, his union sponsored him as a Labour Party candidate in Chorley. This was considered a winnable seat, but Whiting ultimately took second place, with 41.4% of the vote.

Whiting died in 1938, while still serving on the council and working for the union.

Civic offices
| Preceded by Alfred George Edwards | Mayor of Barking; 1935 | Succeeded by William Joseph James |
