= Women's Industrial Council =

British organization active 1894–1917

The Women's Industrial Council (WIC) was a British organisation active from 1894 to about 1917, promoting the interests of women at work.

== Federation ==
The organisation originated as the Women's Trade Union Association, founded by Clementina Black in the East End of London in 1889. It was intended to be a federation of women's trade unions, with early affiliates including the East London Ropemakers' Union, led by Amie Hicks, and the confectioners' union, whose leader, Clara James, became assistant secretary of the association.

The federation was supported by leading figures from the Social Democratic Federation, including Hicks, and also male trade unionists such as John Burns and Tom Mann. However, its membership soon began to fall, and it was refounded as the "Women's Industrial Council" in 1894, with a focus on investigating and reporting on the conditions under which women worked.

== Investigation ==
Under the new leadership of Catherine Webb, this new mission proved more successful, with more than one hundred trades investigated. Most research was conducted in London, but some in other British cities. Hicks and James objected to the research focus and finally left in 1908, but many other women, later to become prominent, became involved. They included Margaret Bondfield, Ishbel Gordon, Elizabeth Leigh Hutchins, Mary Macarthur, Margaret MacDonald, Lucy Wyatt Papworth and Dorothea Margaret Zimmern, and suffragette Louise Eates.

The work of the organisation slowed during World War I and it appears to have disbanded around 1917.

== Archives ==
Archive material from 1895 to 1910 is held at the British Library of Political and Economic Science. Other material from 1907 to 1909 is held in the Trades Union Congress (TUC) Library Collection at London Metropolitan University.
