= Rosalind Travers Hyndman =

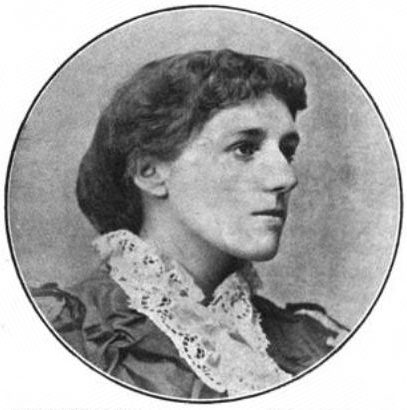
- In The Bookman, February 1908
- Born: Rosalind Caroline Travers; 1874; Horsham, West Sussex, England
- Died: 7 April 1923 (aged 48–49); Hampstead, London, England
- Occupation(s): Poet, writer, suffragist, socialist
- Organization: Social Democratic Federation
- Spouse: Henry Hyndman (m. 1914; died 1921)

Rosalind Travers Hyndman (1874 – 7 April 1923) was an English poet, writer, suffragist, and socialist.

== Life ==
Rosalind Caroline Travers was born in Horsham in 1874, the daughter of John Amory Travers and Florence Ellicot, whose father was the Bishop of Gloucester. John Amory Travers was an Army officer, who attained the rank of colonel. Raised in a comfortable home, Tortington House, Arundel, Sussex, Rosalind was drawn into politics through the women's suffrage movement.

She published two books of plays and poems. For one of these, The Two Arcadias (1905), Richard Garnett wrote an introduction. In a letter to Edward Dowden, he said: "all through there are evidences of strong feeling and occasionally of deep thinking", concluding "It may be that Miss Travers will eventually find other modes of expression more congenial than poetry, but I am confident that, one way or other, she will achieve something remarkable". Reviewing it in Twentieth Century, Dowden wrote:

If we were to classify certain poets into two groups, those who sink deeper and deeper through beauty towards its centre, like Keats, and those who, like Shelley, mount towards beauty from level to level of clear air, the writer of these poems must be ranked among the spirits who climb or soar.

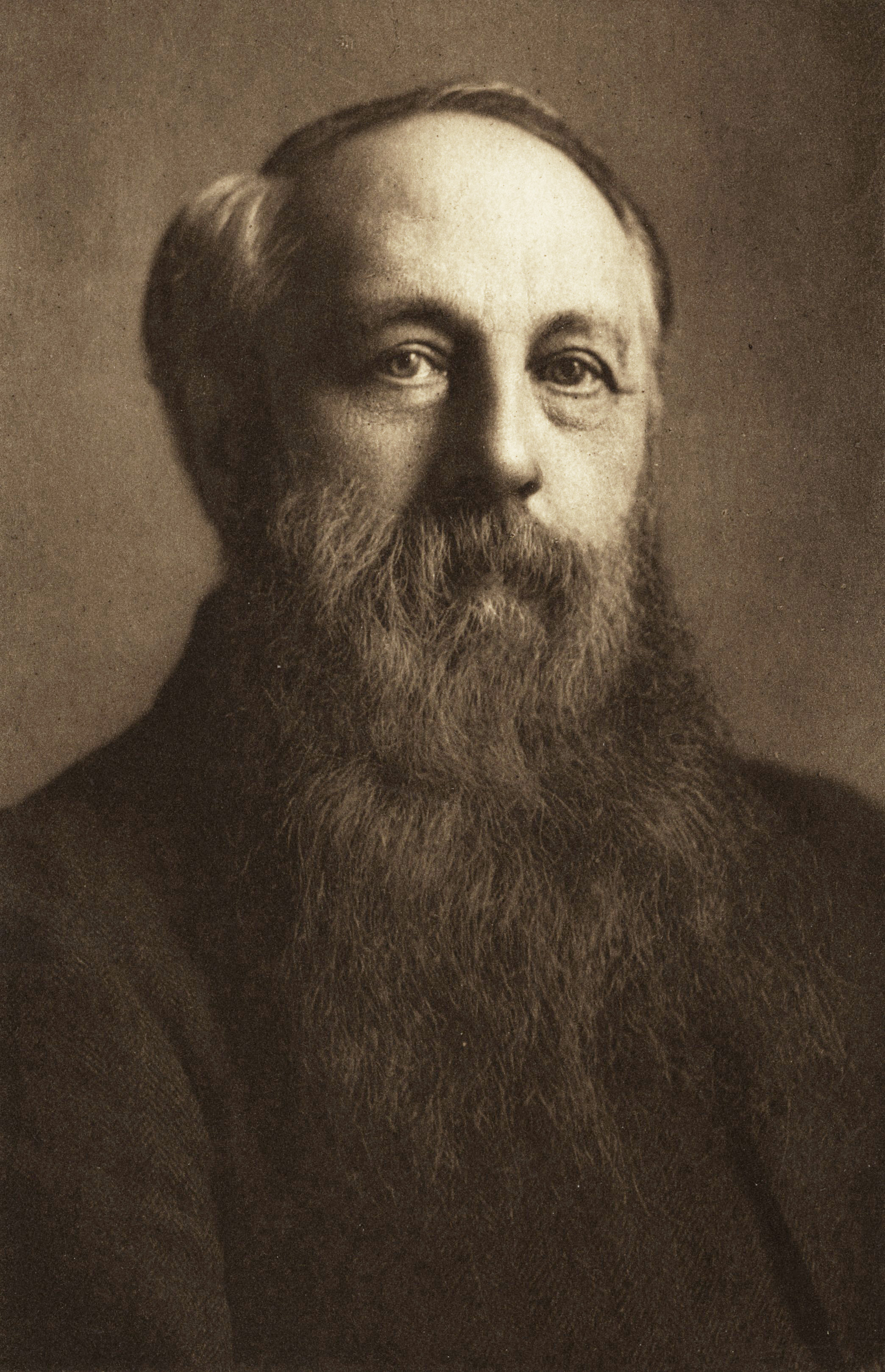
Henry Hyndman, whom Rosalind Travers married in 1914

In 1908, Travers travelled to Finland, developing a sympathy for the Finnish struggle against Russian rule. She met H. M. Hyndman in 1909 at a demonstration in Trafalgar Square. That year, Travers published Letters from Finland. One reviewer wrote that this contained:

an amount of humour which give to her narrative a peculiar charm. She is a poet, and though in her preface she expresses her diffidence as to the ability of a "verse-maker" to undertake a prose book of travel, the reader, and Finland too, have good reason to be thankful that she is a poet. For Finland is a country which, described by a prosaic pen, would leave one cold and unenthusiastic.

Travers wrote admiringly of Finland, known for its educational achievements and positive record with regards to women's rights. For Travers, in this latter respect, Finland could be seen as "the only civilised country in Europe". She corresponded closely with Maikki Friberg, a Finnish suffragist and peace activist.

On 14 May 1914, aged 39, Travers married Henry Hyndman. This put her at odds with her parents, who disapproved. It was said that Rosalind's "ardent support for the Finnish cause reinforced his own lifelong concern for oppressed nationalities". He dedicated The Awakening of Asia (1919) to her.

Hyndman died on 22 November 1921 aged 79. In 1923, Travers published a memoir of the last decade of her husband's life: The Last Years of H. M. Hyndman.

== Death and legacy ==
Soon after submitting her manuscript for publication, Rosalind Travers Hyndman took an overdose of sleeping tablets, and died on 7 April at her home in Well Walk, Hampstead. Her will stated that her estate be devoted to such causes as would keep H. M. Hyndman's legacy alive, alongside £600 to be divided among members of the Social Democratic Federation in need.

Funds derived from either of the Hyndmans' literary works were intended to finance a Hyndman Literary Trust, publishing works by or about Henry. As a result, a pamphlet called Introduction to 'The Life to Come' was published - the preface of a work unfinished at his death. Books of a Lifetime, also by H. M. Hyndman, was an account of the four books which had most influenced him: Lewis H. Morgan's Ancient Society; Karl Marx's Das Kapital; P.B. Shelley's Prometheus Unbound; and Eugène Sue's Le Juif Errant.

Rosalind Hyndman's funeral at Golders Green Crematorium was led by humanist Frederick James Gould. In the course of his address, Gould said:

She was, in the finest sense, a citizen of the world, and her heart burned In service of the idea of liberation.
