= Hendin =

Hendin is a surname. Notable people with the surname include:

- Clara Hendin, British socialist activist
- David Hendin (born 1945), American medical journalist and numismatist
- Josephine Gattuso Hendin (born 1944), American writer and critic
- Marty Hendin (1948–2008), American baseball executive
