= E. J. Pay =

British labour movement activist

Edward J. Pay (c.1875-1931), often known as Teddy Pay, was a British labour movement activist, who was known for his interest in rural affairs.

== Biography ==
Pay was born c.1875 (Kent and Sussex Advertiser, 1 January 1932). He joined the Social Democratic Federation (SDF) in about 1898, at which time he was based in Hastings. However, opposition to his views led him to leave the town and move to Tunbridge Wells, where he became a manager in the local co-operative society. Having worked for many years as a farm labourer, this gave him a keen interest in rural affairs, and he held numerous administrative posts within the co-operative movement, including sitting on its General Agricultural Committee, Land Cultivation Sub-Committee, and Wages and Conciliation Committee.

The SDF became the British Socialist Party (BSP), and Pay was member of the minority in the party who supported British involvement in World War I. As a result, he joined the National Socialist Party, a split from the BSP which affiliated to the Labour Party. After a few years, the National Socialist Party was renamed the "Social Democratic Federation", and Pay became its National Organiser in 1932. In this role, he travelled around Britain, and was based at various times in Buckingham, the East Riding of Yorkshire and Surrey.

Pay stood as the Labour candidate for Buckingham at the 1923 and 1924 general elections, with the sponsorship of the SDF, although he missed out on election on both occasions. He stood in Rugby at the 1931 general election, his Labour Party obituary claiming that he made a "good fight" of the contest.
