= Clara James =

British trade unionist

Clara Grace James (30 October 1866 – 10 August 1954) was a British trade unionist.

Born in Deptford, then in Kent, James's parents died when she was young, and she was brought up by a former employee of her father. She found work making confectionery, and in 1889 she joined the Women's Trade Union Association (WTUA). As a result, she was sacked from her job, but the WTUA helped her find work as a typist, while she volunteered as an organiser and assistant secretary of the WTUA. Its activist Amie Hicks provided her with accommodation and legally adopted James as her daughter.

Through the WTUA, James founded the Confectioners' Union, and served as its general secretary. She worked with Clementina Black and John Burns to win a strike among chocolate makers in 1890, but the union faced high levels of opposition from employers and a highly mobile workforce, leading to its decline and dissolution in 1892. Thereafter, James focused her efforts on trying to organise box-makers. Lilian Gilchrist Thompson paid the WTUA £70 a year for two years to employ James as an investigator.

James and Hicks were the only two women to give evidence to the 1891 Royal Commission on Labour. James also served as a delegate to the London Trades Council, and for a time was the only woman to do so.

The WTUA was refounded in 1894 as the Women's Industrial Council (WIC), and James remained active within it, serving on both its investigation and organisation committees. However, with her sponsorship having concluded, Thompson instead paid for her training as a gymnastics teacher. Once she had completed this, James set up a series of "Working Girls' Clubs", providing lectures, physical drills, social meetings and citizenship classes. These proved popular, and in 1899 the WIC founded the Clubs Industrial Association to formalise this activity. Among the young women who attended her classes was Margaret Bondfield.

James eventually left the Clubs Industrial Association, founding the rival Working Girls at Play organisation, which by 1909 organised 22 regular clubs across London. She began suffering from poor health and had to give up teaching, retiring to Canvey Island. There, she served as a parish councillor, and ran a holiday home for working girls from London.
