= Scottish Amicable =

Scottish Amicable may refer to

- Scottish Amicable Life Assurance, a mutual society established in 1836
- Scottish Amicable Building Society, a building society established in 1892
