= Socialist Union (UK) =

The Socialist Union was a British political party active from February 1886 to 1888.

The group was formed by socialists around C. L. Fitzgerald who left the Social Democratic Federation (SDF) in protest at SDF leader H. M. Hyndman's acceptance of money which Maltman Barry had obtained from the Conservative Party, in order to campaign against the Liberal Party. The group published a newspaper, The Socialist. It succeeded in gaining the support of the Bristol Socialist Society, but elsewhere, membership was small.

The group disbanded in 1887. James MacDonald, a prominent leader, rejoined the SDF, after Hyndman promised never again to accept money from bourgeois politicians. Other notable members of the group included future Prime Minister Ramsay MacDonald.

== See also ==
- Socialist League (UK, 1885)
