= Margaretta Hicks =

Margaretta Hicks was a British socialist activist.

The daughter of trade union activist Amie Hicks, Margaretta joined the Social Democratic Federation in 1883, along with her mother. She soon began speaking on behalf of the party, and developed a particular interest in supporting unemployed women.

In 1904, Hicks stood for the St Pancras Board of Guardians, but she was not elected. She succeeded Dora Montefiore as chair of the SDF's Women's Committee in 1910. The following year, the SDF became part of the new British Socialist Party (BSP). Hicks led the organisation of women in the new party, and launched a women's socialist newspaper, The Link. In 1914, Hicks became the first full-time woman organiser of the BSP.
