= Thomas Webb (co-operator) =

English co-operator (1829–1896)

- Born: Thomas Edward Burgess Webb; July 1829; Battersea, London, England
- Died: 2 December 1896 (aged 67); Raynes Park, London, England
- Movement: Co-operative
- Spouse: Catherine Young (m. 1854)
- Children: 5, including Catherine and Arthur

Thomas Edward Burgess Webb (July 1829 – 2 December 1896) was an English co-operator who was for 45 years a leading figure in the Battersea and Wandsworth Co-operative Society, as well as involvement in the People's Co-operative Society, Co-operative Permanent Building Society, Co-operative Printing Society, and the Co-operative Wholesale Society. Two of his children, Catherine and Arthur, were themselves prominent co-operators.

== Biography ==
Webb was born in July 1829 in Battersea, London, to James and Mary Ann Webb (née Burgess). From a young age until 1878 he worked as a coppersmith at Price's Candle Factory in Vauxhall.

In 1854 he married Catherine Young, with whom he would have five children, including the co-operators Catherine and Arthur Webb.

In 1854 he was a founding member of the Battersea and Wandsworth Co-operative Society, serving on the committee until 1860, then as the chairman until 1874, then as secretary until 1878. From 1878 to 1890 he served as permanent secretary and manager of the society, then from 1890 until his death as honorary president of the society.

He served as the first president of the People's Co-operative Society. From 1884 he was a founding member and chairman of the Co-operative Permanent Building Society, and was on the board of the Co-operative Printing Society from 1866. From 1874 until his death he served as a director of the Co-operative Wholesale Society.

He died in Raynes Park, London, on 2 December 1896 and was survived by his wife and four of his children. He is buried in St Mary's Cemetery, Battersea.
