= Fred Knee =

British trade unionist and politician

Fred Knee (16 June 1868 – 8 December 1914) was a British trade unionist and socialist politician.

Born in Frome, Somerset, Knee became a printer and moved to London in search of work. By 1892, Knee was living in Wimbledon and had joined the Social Democratic Federation and the Co-operative Society. Becoming well known through a campaign for cheap workmen's train tickets, he moved to Battersea and in 1898 founded the Workmen's Housing Council to campaign for better housing for workers.

Knee was elected to Metropolitan Borough of Battersea on its formation in 1900. He became an alderman and the chair of the Housing Committee, instituting a major programme of construction, producing some of the nation's first council housing. Even as an adult, Fred barely reached 5 feet in height and was plagued by ill health: he became known as 'The Mighty Atom'. He moved to Radlett in Hertfordshire in 1901, but remained active in Battersea until 1906. Knee remained a prominent member of the SDF and its successor, the British Socialist Party. In 1913, Knee became the Secretary of the London Trades Council, but he died the following year and is buried in Radlett.

A plaque on the school where he was educated in Milk Street, Frome has been placed in 2014 by the Frome Society for Local Study. He has another (1986) from the Greater London Council at 24 Sugden Road, in Clapham, Wandsworth where he lived.

Trade union offices
Preceded by James MacDonald	Secretary of the London Trades Council; 1913–1914	Succeeded by John Stokes
Party political offices
Preceded by New position	Secretary of the London Labour Party; 1914	Succeeded by Herbert Morrison
