= Dan Irving =

British politician

- Irving in 1908

Member of Parliament for Burnley
- In office 14 December 1918 – 25 January 1924
- Preceded by: Philip Morrell
- Succeeded by: Arthur Henderson

Personal details
- Born: 31 October 1854 Birmingham, England
- Died: 25 January 1924 (aged 69)
- Party: Labour

David Daniel Irving (31 October 1854 – 25 January 1924) was a British socialist activist and Labour Party Member of Parliament.

== Biography ==
Born in Birmingham, Irving moved to Bristol in 1875, where he began working on the railways. After he lost his leg in an industrial accident, the Midland Railway forced him to take a pay cut. Angered by this injustice, he joined the Bristol Socialist Society and became an activist in a gasworkers' union, which soon merged into the National Union of Gas Workers and General Labourers.

In 1892, Irving worked with Herbert V. Mills in an attempt to start a utopian socialist community at Starnthwaite, but this soon disintegrated, and Irving eventually won a legal case against Mills. Instead, he became a socialist lecturer, and then in 1894, secretary of the Burnley branch of the Social Democratic Federation (SDF).

Burnley was one of the SDF's most important branches, and Irving kept its profile high. In the 1906 general election, SDF leader H. M. Hyndman stood in the Burnley constituency, and came within 350 votes of winning the seat. In 1902, Irving was elected to Burnley Town Council, a post he held (with one gap) until 1922.

In the 1906 election, Irving himself stood for Accrington; he then stood in the 1908 Manchester North West by-election, and in the January and December 1910 general elections he stood in Rochdale. While his votes varied considerably, as an SDF candidate he never came close to winning a seat.

In 1911, Irving followed the SDF into the formation of the British Socialist Party. In 1914, he was a supporter of British action in World War I, and as a result, when the SDF split on the issue, he joined Hyndman's new group, the National Socialist Party. This group affiliated to the Labour Party, and as a Labour candidate he was finally able to win a Parliamentary seat, taking Burnley in the 1918 general election. He held the seat in 1922 and 1923, but remained a low-profile MP and died in 1924 aged 69.

In 1921 Irving gave evidence to the Select Committee on Members' Expenses. He said that it was not possible for him to live on the salary of £400 that MPs received. He had to keep up his house in Burnley and also pay £165 for a third-class railway pass. He rented a single room when in London. He spoke of feeling "a little sense of humiliation" when in contact with other MPs who did not have to think so carefully about what they spent.

Parliament of the United Kingdom
Preceded by Philip Morrell	Member of Parliament for Burnley; 1918 – 1924	Succeeded by Arthur Henderson
Party political offices
Preceded by Will Thorne	President of the Social Democratic Federation; 1901	Succeeded by F. J. Jones
Preceded by H. M. Hyndman	President of the British Socialist Party; 1913	Succeeded by John Stokes
