= Arthur Webb (co-operator) =

British co-operator

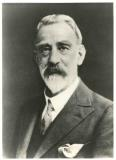
- Born: 8 July 1868; Battersea, London, England
- Died: 16 October 1952 (aged 84); Wimbledon, London, England
- Years active: 1892–1952
- Organization: Co-operative Permanent Building Society
- Movement: Co-operative
- Spouse: Mabel Elizabeth Edwards (m. 1899)
- Children: 4
- Father: Thomas Webb
- Relatives: Catherine Webb (sister)

Arthur Webb (8 July 1868 – 16 October 1952) was an English co-operator who is best known for his work in the Co-operative Permanent Building Society.

== Biography ==
Arthur Webb, the son of Thomas Burgess Webb and Catherine (née Young) Webb, was born in Battersea, London on 8 July 1868. He had an older brother Thomas (26 August 1857 – 14 June 1866) and older sister Katherine 'Kate' (1859 – 29 July 1947). He was educated at Sir Walter St John's Grammar School.

His father was one of the founders of the Co-operative Permanent Building Society and Webb followed in his footsteps when he was appointed secretary of the Co-operative Permanent Building Society in 1892; joined the board in 1927; held the position of managing director between 1928 and 1939, then became president and continued on the board until 1951.

According to Mike Cassell, author of Inside Nationwide, Webb believed that "building societies represented a golden opportunity to raise the standard of living for millions of ordinary people" and much of the early success of the Society can be ascribed to Webb's hard work and determination. Albert Mansbridge, who wrote Brick Upon Brick, also praised Webb's abilities and focus at the Co-operative Permanent Building Society.

In 1930, Webb wrote a short reflective article on the foundation of the Society in which he described the motivation of the Society members to provide houses for people and the value of homeownership to those who had been tenants. Over 50 years, and by 1934, the Society had provided homes for about 208,000 people in 52,000 houses, having provided more than 26 million pounds in mortgages.

During the Second World War, Webb's home in Wimbledon was bombed and destroyed on 18 September 1940 and he and his family moved to High Wycombe to share a small bungalow with the family of the Society's secretary who has also lost his home due to bombing. Later that same year, Webb stepped down as president while retaining his place on the board. The minutes record that a cheque for £1000 was to be presented to him in appreciation for his work for the Society and to help recover from the bombing.

In 1942, his book Signposts of Building Society Finance was published. Webb retired from the board in 1951. On his departure he presented the society with a shield which was to be presented each year to the branch or office which had made the most outstanding contribution to the Society's prestige and progress. The Arthur Webb Challenge Cup (as it was known) was then awarded every year until the early 1970s.

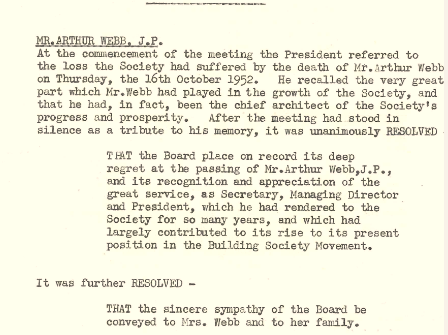
Extract from board minutes of Co-Operative Permanent Building Society from October 1952

Arthur Webb died on 16 October 1952 at home in Wimbledon, London. His death was recorded in the minutes of the next board meeting of the Co-operative Permanent Building Society.

His wife was the cookery writer and broadcaster Mrs Arthur Webb.
