= Elizabeth Leigh Hutchins =

Elizabeth Leigh Hutchins (20 April 1858 – 17 October 1935), also known as B. L. Hutchins, was a British social researcher and socialist activist.

Born in Hanover Square in London, Hutchins was educated privately and at King's College, London, then as one of the first students at the London School of Economics (LSE).

Hutchins developed an interest in socialism, joining the Women's Industrial Council in 1899 and the Fabian Society in 1900. She wrote more than twenty works on matters relating to women's work, including History of Factory Legislation, and Women in Modern Industry. In this work, she championed laws protecting women's working conditions, including minimum wages, and criticised some middle class feminists for opposing these. She served on the executive of the Fabian Society from 1907 until 1912, and lectured at King's College on behalf of the Women's Industrial Council.

After World War I, Hutchins focused her time on the League of Nations Union, and she also funded a permanent scholarship at the LSE. She remained active in the Fabian Society, and was a member of the committee of the Fabian Women's Group until her death in 1935.
