= John Stokes (trade unionist) =

John Stokes (12 May 1872 – 17 September 1942) was a British trade unionist and political activist.

Stokes came to prominence as secretary of the small London Glass Bottle Makers union. He was also a member of the British Socialist Party (BSP), who put him forward as their proposed candidate for Bradford East at the election which was expected to take place in 1914 or 1915. However, this was against the wishes of local BSP activists, and he failed to gain the support of the local Independent Labour Party.

Long active on the London Trades Council, Stokes replaced his BSP comrade Fred Knee as its secretary in 1914, serving for three years. Also in 1914, the BSP affiliated to the Labour Party, and Stokes immediately took a leading role in founding the London Labour Party, serving as its first Chairman.

Although Stokes strongly opposed conscription during World War I, he did not oppose the war overall. This placed him on the right wing of the BSP, and in 1916 he joined several other leading figures in splitting away to form the National Socialist Party (NSP).

Stokes remained secretary of his union, while also becoming chair of the National Federation of Glass Workers and Kindred Trade Unions.

Trade union offices
Preceded by Harry Quelch	Chairman of the London Trades Council; 1913–1914	Succeeded by Edward Friend
Preceded by Fred Knee	Secretary of the London Trades Council; 1914–1917	Succeeded by Duncan Carmichael
Preceded by Ben Cooper	Treasurer of the London Trades Council; 1917–1942	Succeeded by Harry Hynd
Preceded by Joe Hall and Jimmy Rowan	Trades Union Congress representative to the American Federation of Labour; 1934; With: Alexander Walkden	Succeeded by Andrew Conley and Andrew Naesmith
Party political offices
Preceded by Dan Irving	President of the British Socialist Party; 1914	Succeeded by Arthur Seabury
Preceded by New position	Chairman of the London Labour Party; 1915 – 1916	Succeeded by Fred Bramley
