= Clara Hendin =

British socialist activist

Clara Selina Hendin (née Bidwell; 13 April 1866 – 1941) was a British socialist activist.

Hendin was born in Paddington, London, the daughter of Walter Bidwell and Louisa Ellen Emmett. At aged 14, she was working as a dressmaker's apprentice. In 1890, she married Charles Terry Hendin.

She lived in Kensal Town, in London, and became active in the Social Democratic Federation (SDF) and the Women's Co-operative Guild. In 1896, she was a delegate to the Fourth Congress of the Second International in London, and she later became honorary secretary of the Socialist Women's Bureau. From 1902 until 1905, she served on the executive of the SDF, and she was active in the development of women's circles of the party.

In 1910, in line with Second International policy, Hendin dissolved the Socialist Women's Bureau and formed the Women's International Council of Socialist and Labour Organisations (British Section), becoming a vice-chair. She remained active in the SDF, and its successor, the British Socialist Party.
