= Mrs Arthur Webb =

Mrs. Arthur Webb née Mabel Elizabeth Edwards (1874-1957) was a writer who wrote for Farmer's Weekly and also appeared on BBC Radio during World War II in connection with the network's broadcasts for housewives.

Of concern in those days was the conservation of kitchen fuel. As a writer for Farmer's Weekly Mrs Arthur Webb recommended cooking full meals in a steamer including puddings and cakes. When Mrs. Arthur Webb's Economical Cookery was published in 1934 it didn't appeal much to the working class British public.

One of her projects with the BBC was to collect recipes from British farmhouses in all parts of the country. The recipe she recorded for "Norfolk dumplings" was a simple yeast-leavened bread dough, "not a sweet", cooked by boiling and often served as a substantial part of the meal, or on their own if there wasn't any meat.

"Making the Most of a Wartime Larder" was broadcast with Mrs. Arthur Webb at 9:45 AM in September 1939. Beginning in 1940, The Ministry of Food prepared recipes and information to be broadcast to British housewives daily by the BBC Home Service everyday between 8:15 and 8:20, timed in the morning before housewives did their daily shopping. Part of the purpose of these broadcasts was to give women information on what types of foods were available at markets and what they needed to conserve as part of the war effort.

She was married to Arthur Webb, the building society administrator.
