= Henry W. Lee (socialist) =

Henry William Lee, often known as H. W. Lee (10 July 1865 – 5 March 1932) was a prominent British socialist.

Born in London, Lee worked in the printing industry, then joined the Social Democratic Federation (SDF) soon after its foundation. He became the full-time Assistant Secretary of the party in 1885 and soon after became its General Secretary. He held this position until the organisation dissolved itself into the new British Socialist Party. Again appointed the Secretary, he held the post for only two years, in 1913 taking over from Harry Quelch as editor of Justice.

Lee supported British involvement World War I, alongside such prominent party members as H. M. Hyndman and Will Thorne. However, this proved to be a minority position in the party, and Lee was a member of the right-wing split of 1916 which founded the National Socialist Party. This group opposed the October Revolution, and Lee wrote a pamphlet entitled "Bolshevism: A Curse and Danger to the Workers".

Lee stepped down from his editorial post in 1923, but remained on the national executive of the associated group, now again known as the "Social Democratic Federation". He spent his last years working at the headquarters of the Trades Union Congress.

In 1935, Lee's Social-Democracy in Britain, a history of the movement to date, was published.

Party political offices
Preceded by Henry Hyde Champion	Secretary of the Social Democratic Federation; 1885–1911	Succeeded by Position abolished
Preceded by New position	Secretary of the British Socialist Party; 1911–1913	Succeeded by Albert Inkpin
Media offices
Preceded by Harry Quelch	Editor of Justice; 1913–1923	Succeeded by Tom Kennedy?
