= Arthur Charles Bannington =

British political activist

Arthur Charles Bannington (1 December 1878 – 4 February 1951) was a British political activist.

== Biography ==
A carpenter and joiner by trade, Bannington was born in Birmingham, the fourth child of Thomas and Alice Bannington.

Living in Coventry, Bannington came to prominence as a member of the Marxist Social Democratic Federation (SDF). At the January 1910 general election, he stood for the SDF in Carlisle. Although he visited on several occasions, his campaign was hampered as he was unable to take much time off work to visit the seat, so William Gallacher deputised for him. He took 11.3% of the vote and was not elected.

The SDF became the British Socialist Party (BSP), and it locally affiliated to the Labour Party. Under this label, in 1913, Bannington was elected to Coventry City Council, defeating a long-standing Liberal Party councillor. The BSP soon disaffiliated from Labour, with Bannington's departure considered the greatest loss.

In 1916, the BSP adopted a position opposing British involvement in World War I. Bannington strongly objected to this and resigned from the party, joining the Army Tank Corps. He rose to the rank of sergeant, but was invalided out in 1918, suffering with shell shock.

In Bannington's absence, other former BSP members in the city had formed a local branch of the National Federation of Discharged and Demobilized Sailors and Soldiers. This adopted Bannington as its candidate for Coventry at the 1918 general election, and his campaign focused on attacking the official Labour Party candidate, R. C. Wallhead. Wallhead was a member of the Independent Labour Party who had opposed the war, but he was able to remind crowds of anti-militarist statements made by Bannington before the war. Ultimately, both candidates were defeated by Edward Manville, a Coalition Conservative politician; Bannington took 3,806 votes and fourth place in poll, behind Wallhead. Soon afterwards, Bannington left the city, relocating to Oxford, where he devoted his time to the Amalgamated Society of Woodworkers.

Party political offices
Preceded by H. M. Hyndman	President of the Social Democratic Party; 1911	Succeeded by Party merged
