= Catherine Webb (co-operative activist) =

British activist

- Born: 4 May 1859; Battersea, London, England
- Died: 29 July 1947 (aged 88); Wimbledon, London, England
- Burial place: Streatham Vale Cemetery, Streatham Vale, London, England
- Education: Co-operative Women's Guild
- Occupations: Activist, writer and educator
- Employer: Morley College
- Organization(s): Women's Industrial Council, Co-operative Women's Guild
- Known for: Early cooperative movement
- Father: Thomas Webb
- Relatives: Arthur Webb (brother)

Catherine Webb (4 May 1859 – 29 July 1947) was an influential activist in the early cooperative movement, writer and educator. She was general secretary of the Women's Industrial Council (WIC), general secretary of the Co-operative Women's Guild and vice-president of Morley College.

== Early life ==
Webb was born on 4 May 1859 in Battersea, London, and she had a brother, Arthur Webb. She was the daughter of Thomas Edward Burgess Webb, a journeyman coppersmith and the manager of the Battersea and Wandsworth Cooperative Society. Her mother was Catherine Webb (née Young). Her father worked his way up from poverty through the cooperative movement, allowing his children to be raised as middle-class. Webb's comfortable upbringing raised questions in the class, which she later referred herself as “a working woman.”

== Career ==
Webb joined the Women's Co-operative Guild in 1883 and became one of the most visible women of the movement, along with Rosalind Nash and Margaret Llewelyn Davies. In the 1890s, her interests also lay in women's waged labour, which led her to become involved with the Women's Industrial Council (WIC). Webb was elected WIC's general secretary from 1895 to 1902 and was also elected to the Southern Section of the Central Board of the Cooperative Union in 1895. During the 1890s, she attended university extension courses at Morley College.

Webb served as a trusted lieutenant to Margaret Llewelyn Davies during her tenure as general secretary of the Co-operative Women's Guild from 1889 to 1911. Webb also edited the Guild's “Notes” feature in the “Women’s Corner” of the Co-operative News, writing about women workers and their unions and organizations, such as the Women's Industrial Council and Lady Emilia Dilke's Women's Trade Union League. From 1905 to 1930, she served as secretary of the Guild's Convalescent Fund, which had been established in 1895 to support members in need or recuperating.

Webb believed that once women workers were unionised, wages would increase and that co-operators should collaborate with trade unionists to organize workers. Webb also considered the guildsmen to have a special role in this project because, as shoppers, women could influence factory conditions and management by not buying products made with sweatshop labour and by encouraging stores not to sell products made by sweatshops. The result would be that sweatshop owners would be put out of business. She agreed with co-operative activist J.T.W. Mitchell that "there is no power greater than that of a woman when rightly exercised." Webb was the author of The Woman with the Basket, one of the most comprehensive sources for the early history of the Co-operative Women's Guild.

From 1915, Webb served on the council of her former college, Morley, retaining her position until she became vice-president of the college in 1946. The following year, she wrote a history of the institution, titled History of Morley College for Working Men and Women in Lambeth, London.

== Death ==
Webb died on 29 July 1947 in Wimbledon, London. She was cremated and buried at Streatham Vale Cemetery in Streatham Vale, London, on 1 August 1947.

== Publications ==
- Webb, Catherine. The Woman with the Basket (1927) Manchester: Co-operative Wholesale Society Print Works.
- Webb, Catherine. History of Morley College for Working Men and Women in Lambeth, London.
