= L. S. Bevington =

English anarchist and poet (1845–1895)

- Born: Louisa Sarah Bevington; 14 May 1845; St John's Hill, Battersea, Surrey, England
- Died: 28 November 1895 (aged 50); Willesden Green, London, England
- Other name: Louisa Sarah Guggenberger
- Occupations: Poet; Writer
- Movement: Anarchism
- Spouse: Ignatz Felix Guggenberger

Louisa Sarah Bevington (14 May 1845 – 28 November 1895) was an English anarchist, essayist and poet. Among those who attended her funeral was Peter Kropotkin.

== Early life and works ==
Bevington was born in St John's Hill, Battersea, Surrey, now London Borough of Wandsworth, on 14 May 1845, the oldest of eight children (seven daughters) born to the Quaker family of Alexander Bevington and his wife Louisa. Her father's occupation was given as "gentleman"; in 1861–1871 he was a member of Lloyd's. Details of her education are unknown, but the 1861 England census lists her among 30 scholars at a school run by a Miss Eliza Hovell at Marlborough House, Winchcombe Street, Cheltenham, while her parents and siblings are said to reside at Walthamstow, with four house servants and a coachman. She began to write poetry at an early age, probably appearing first with two sonnets in the Friends' Quarterly Examiner in October 1871.

Bevington's first collection, the 23-page Key Notes, appeared in London in 1876 under the pseudonym Arbor Leigh. A second publication, Key-Notes: 1879, appeared under the name L. S. Bevington and seemed to query some established Christian codes of conduct. A further volume, Poems, Lyrics and Sonnets (1882) contained metrical experiments and remarks on the moribund state of Christianity.

One London weekly wrote admiringly of a poem in Bevington's 1879 Key-Notes, describing it as "an exposition of the theory, physical and moral, of Evolution, which she entitles, 'Unto This Present'. If it were nothing else, it would be quite remarkable, as a literary tour de force, for the extraordinary ingenuity and success with which the writer has reduced to verse that never ceases to have a certain smoothness and even harmony, an argument bristling, so to speak, with philosophical terms. But it is more than this. It is a very eloquent and lucid philosophical statement, which, we take it, a scientific teacher would allow to give a clear and well-defined outline of the theory." Another reviewer, however, found that Bevington's style was one for which, "in the present condition of the English language, there is no vocabulary, but which exactly corresponds to the peculiar qualities known as 'goodiness,' 'cant,' and 'unctuosity,' when the writer or speaker happens to be content with the faith of his or her fathers. To us the style is equally offensive, whatever may be the opinions of the stylist, and we have rarely come across a more offensive example of it than these Key Notes... [although] in the midst of this come a series of poems on the months, and a few miscellaneous songs which possess great simplicity, melody, and truth."

More widely read and appreciated were her prose arguments on similar subjects. In an article in The Nineteenth Century in October 1879, entitled "Atheism and Morality", Bevington took a clear secularist position that provoked a clerical response. In December the same year, Bevington concluded a two-part essay entitled "Modern Atheism and Mr. Mallock". This reacted to an attack on atheism in the same paper by a young Oxford graduate, by putting forward a spirited defence of secular morality: "So far as human life is worth living, so far is it worth protecting. So far as it is not worth living, so far is it needful to ameliorate it. Duty, on secular principles, consists in the summarized conduct conducive to the permanent protection and progressive amelioration of the human lot.... Religion's foster-child, Society, must eventually learn to trust her own two feet of civil and moral law, and run alone."

A further contribution to the debate was prompted by a letter to Bevington from the philosopher Herbert Spencer, pointing out that rationalists showed greater humanity than adherents of organized religion. Her exposition of this appeared in The Fortnightly Review in August 1881, entitled "The Moral Colour of Rationalism". The discussion continued as an altercation between Spencer and the historian Goldwyn Smith in The Contemporary Review.

In 1883 Bevington travelled to Germany, where on 2 May that year she married the artist Ignatz Guggenberger in Munich. However, writing under her maiden name in 1888, she complained, "The minor and superficial domesticities of the hour are [the German woman's] only field of aspiration; klatsch [gossip] with her feminine acquaintances, or hanging out of window, are the most usual delights of her leisure hours; and even within the province assigned to her she habitually shrinks from the smallest mental departure on her own account.... [The] majority of German women are decidedly poor company, and the German home is humdrum and barren of all attraction for the other sex." Her marriage lasted only until 1890, when she returned to London. There she began to move in anarchist circles and continued to use her maiden name. (In 1891 she commented to an unknown correspondent that she preferred "L. S. Bevington" to "Miss Bevington", as she routinely objected to "Mrs" and "Miss", and suggested that her married name, Guggenberger, would have value only as an afterthought in a German publication. The letter was signed "L. S. Guggenberger".)

== Anarchist writings ==
Bevington quickly came to know many London anarchists and gain a name as an anarchist poet. This was probably achieved through Charlotte Wilson, who with Peter Kropotkin had founded the anarchist paper Freedom in 1886. However, Bevington rejected the tactics of bombs and dynamite and became associated with another paper, Liberty, edited by the Scottish anarchist and tailor James Tochatti, for which she wrote numerous articles and poems. She also contributed to The Torch, which was edited by Helen and Olivia Rossetti, nieces of the painter, and in an Anarchist Manifesto distributed in 1895 for the short-lived Anarchist Communist Alliance. She translated an essay on the Paris Commune by Louise Michel, who became a friend.

Shortly before her death from dropsy and mitral heart disease on 28 November 1895 on Lechmere Road, Willesden Green, Middlesex (now London Borough of Brent), at the age of fifty, Bevington wrote further articles for Liberty and published a final collection of poems, of which some were later set to music. One of those she contributed to Liberty that year was "The Secret of the Bees", which includes the lines, "What man only talks of, the busy bee does;/Shares food, and keeps order, with no waste of buzz."

Among those attending the funeral of Louisa Sarah Bevington at Finchley Cemetery were Tochatti, Kropotkin, and the Rossetti sisters.

The Collected Essays of L. S. Bevington were reprinted in 2010.

== External resources ==
- Poems and articles by Bevington online. Mantex Victorian Women Writers – 07 (Archived)
- "Bevington, L. S. (Louisa Sarah), 1845-1895". onlinebooks.library.upenn.edu.
