= Lorenzo Quelch =

British trade unionist and politician

Lorenzo Edward Quelch (5 January 1862 – 19 May 1937) was a British trade unionist and politician.

Born in Little Bedwyn in Wiltshire, Quelch was the younger brother of Harry Quelch. He worked for a livestock dealer from the age of eight then, when he reached fourteen, followed his father into working in an iron foundry. He moved to a rival firm for a promised increase in wages, but this was not delivered and he was instead soon laid off, rendering him unemployed for two years until he was able to regain work at his original employer. This enabled him to complete an apprenticeship; during this period, he also married Harriet Rosier, and became prominent in the local temperance movement.

Quelch's brother Harry had moved to London and joined the Democratic Federation. Lorenzo was influenced by this and distributed literature from the group, but was also associated with the local Liberal Party. They gave him funds to start a working men's club in Hungerford, and Lorenzo used this to promote the ideas of the Democratic Federation in the town. In 1891, he was elected as the Berkshire secretary for the English Land Restoration League, then as regional organiser the following year. In order to further this, Quelch moved to Reading in 1893, and also joined the renamed Social Democratic Federation (SDF). He proved an effective organiser, in particular rallying unemployed workers and encouraging town councils to provide paid labour for them. Through it, he became active in the Agricultural and General Workers' Union, and attended the Trades Union Congress in 1895 on its behalf.

Quelch stood for the Reading Board of Guardians on three occasions from 1894 to 1897; he was not elected, although several other SDF candidates were. In 1896, the AGWU collapsed, leaving Quelch unemployed, although he was able to find work for the SDF itself, initially in Reading, then by co-option to the SDF executive as a national propagandist. He campaigned for his brother in the 1898 Reading by-election, then afterwards spent time in Gibraltar, organising the Coal Porters' Union. He spent six successful months there before moving to London, alternating work in foundries and for the SDF. The SDF became the core of a new British Socialist Party (BSP), and Quelch was its delegate to the Reading Trades and Labour Council, becoming the council's secretary in 1917.

The BSP affiliated to the Labour Party, and with its support, Quelch was elected to Reading Town Council for the Minster ward in 1914. He also became president of the town's new Trade Union Club. Quelch organised a vote of local BSP members to gauge their views on British involvement in World War I; they were in favour, and so Quelch gave pro-war speeches, and joined the National Socialist Party (NSP) split from the BSP. He hoped to be the Labour candidate for Reading at the 1918 general election, but instead an anti-war Independent Labour Party member was chosen, and Quelch stood against him as an independent NSP candidate. He took only 5.2% of the vote and came bottom of the poll. Following the declaration of the result, he conceded that standing against Labour was a mistake, and he thereafter devoted his time to the party.

Quelch remained on the town council, and was also elected to the Board of Guardians in 1919, focusing his time on finding solutions to problems of unemployment and promoting house building in the town. He became an alderman in 1933, serving until his death four years later.
