= National Socialist Party (UK) =

British political party (1916–1941)

- Secretary: Tom Kennedy
- Founder: H.M. Hyndman
- Founded: 1916
- Dissolved: 1941
- Split from: British Socialist Party
- Merged into: Labour Party
- Newspaper: Justice
- Ideology: Defencism; Social democracy; Democratic socialism
- Political position: Centre-left to left-wing

The National Socialist Party was a small political party in the United Kingdom, founded in 1916. It originated as a minority group within the British Socialist Party who supported British participation in World War I; while historically linked with the Marxist left, the party broke with internationalism. The National Socialist Party was affiliated to the Labour Party and was eventually absorbed by it.

Despite its name, it was not ideologically connected to the Nazi Party or National Socialism.

== Origins ==
The National Socialist Party was founded by H.M. Hyndman and his followers after his defeat in the leadership elections of the British Socialist Party. They believed that it was desirable to support the United Kingdom in World War I against "Prussian militarism". Although maintaining that they were a Marxist party, after affiliation to the Labour Party in 1918, they renounced vanguardism and saw in the Russian Revolution only the danger that it might weaken the United Kingdom's war effort. The party was grouped around the newspaper Justice.

Three members of the party were elected to Parliament in the 1918 election; Dan Irving and Will Thorne were elected for the Labour Party, and Jack Jones under the National Socialist Party name.

== Social Democratic Federation ==
In 1919, the group changed its name to the Social Democratic Federation, reverting to the name that the British Socialist Party had used. At one point eleven MPs were members, but after Hyndman died in 1921, the group gradually dissolved into the Labour Party. The party sponsored several candidates at each election until 1924, all of whom ran for Labour. After 1924, its MPs were instead sponsored by their local Labour Party. The party finally disbanded in 1939 due to a lack of funds, although some remaining members formed a "Social Democratic Fellowship".

Other prominent members included Henry W. Lee, Hunter Watts, John Stokes and Joseph Burgess.

== Election results ==
Election	Seats won	±	Total votes	%	Position	Leader
1918	1 / 670	▲	11,013 (#21)	0.1%		Henry Hyndman

=== 1918 UK general election ===
Constituency	Candidate	Votes	Percentage	Position
Burnley	Dan Irving	15,217	41.9	1
Reading	Lorenzo Quelch	1,462	5.2	4
Romford	Arthur Whiting	2,580	14.4	3
Silvertown	John Joseph Jones	6,971	51.6	1

=== By-elections, 1918–1922 ===
Election	Candidate	Votes	Percentage	Position
1921 Kirkcaldy Burghs by-election	Tom Kennedy	11,674	53.4	1

=== 1922 UK general election ===
Constituency	Candidate	Votes	Percentage	Position
Burnley	Dan Irving	17,385	39.1	1
Kirkcaldy Burghs	Tom Kennedy	12,089	48.6	2

=== 1923 UK general election ===
Constituency	Candidate	Votes	Percentage	Position
Buckingham	Edward J. Pay	11,824	47.0	2
Burnley	Dan Irving	16,848	37.8	1
Islington South	William Sampson Cluse	7,764	37.0	1
Islington West	Frederick Montague	7,955	41.4	1
Kirkcaldy Burghs	Tom Kennedy	14,221	54.4	1

=== 1924 UK general election ===
Election	Candidate	Votes	Percentage	Position
Buckingham	Edward J. Pay	8,939	30.6	2
Islington South	William Sampson Cluse	10,347	42.8	1
Islington West	Frederick Montague	10,174	45.3	1
Kirkcaldy Burghs	Tom Kennedy	14,038	52.7	1
