= Justice (newspaper) =

Weekly newspaper of the Social Democratic Federation in the UK

Socialist postcard depicting Justice.

Justice was the weekly newspaper of the Social Democratic Federation (SDF) in the United Kingdom. It was started at the beginning of 1884 with the help of a donation of £300 from Edward Carpenter, who two years previously had inherited his father's estate. (Note: E. Belfort Bax: Early Days of the SDF (1923) Many issues appeared with the by-line "Organ of the Social Democracy".)

The paper was initially edited by C. L. Fitzgerald, and later by H. M. Hyndman, Henry Hyde Champion, Ernest Belfort Bax, then Harry Quelch for many years, and finally Henry W. Lee. It attempted to present scholarly ideas in a serious fashion, featuring work by William Morris, Peter Kropotkin, Edward Aveling, Alfred Russel Wallace and Charlotte Wilson (Note: Wilson made two contributions to the November 1844 issue under the pen name "An English Anarchist". (Quail 2019, p. 67).)

After the SDF became the British Socialist Party, in 1911, Justice continued as the weekly publication of that party, but in 1916, the group around Justice split away to form the National Socialist Party. The paper then became the organ of that party, which soon joined the Labour Party and renamed itself the Social Democratic Federation again. In 1925 Justice was renamed the Social Democrat and became a monthly. It was edited by William Sampson Cluse until its demise in 1933.

== Editors ==
1884: C. L. Fitzgerald
1884: H. M. Hyndman
1886: Harry Quelch
1889: H. M. Hyndman
1891: Harry Quelch
1913: Henry W. Lee
1923: Tom Kennedy
1929: Walton Newbold
1931: William Sampson Cluse
