= Harry Quelch =

British trade unionist

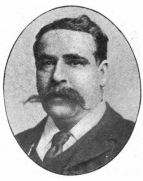
Quelch in the early 1900s.

Henry Quelch (30 January, 1858 – 17 September, 1913) was one of the first Marxists and founders of the social democratic movement in Great Britain. He was a socialist activist, journalist and trade unionist. His brother, Lorenzo "Len" Quelch, was also a socialist activist, while his son, Tom Quelch, achieved note as a prominent communist activist.

== Biography ==
=== Early years ===
Harry Quelch was born 30 January 1858 in the small town of Hungerford, Berkshire, England. He was the son and grandson of a village blacksmith; his maternal grandfather had been an agricultural labourer.

Circumstances forced the eldest child, Harry, into the world to contribute to the family's maintenance from a very young age, with Harry taking his first job at the age of 10. He worked variously in an upholsterer's shop and later for a local dairyman and cattle dealer. At the age of 14 he left Berkshire for good to make his way in the big city of London.

In London the boy worked a succession of jobs in a biscuit factory, in a tannery, and in an iron foundry before landing a better job as a packer in a paper warehouse. This last job allowed the boy sufficient free time to teach himself French. It was in this language that he first read the writing of Karl Marx as part of the process of his self-education. It was in this way that he was converted to the ideas of Social-Democracy. He also later taught himself German, the de facto official language of international socialism.

Quelch married in 1879 and soon fathered a family of his own. His son, Tom, followed in his father's footsteps as a radical political activist, becoming a founding member of the Communist Party of Great Britain.

=== Political career ===
Harry Quelch joined the Democratic Federation (forerunner of the Social Democratic Federation, SDF) in 1881 at the age of 23. Just two years later the young man was elected to its executive. In April 1884 Quelch became an international delegate of the British socialist movement for the first time when he and Hyndman were sent to Paris to attend a congress of the French Workers' Party.

When a large section of the party's active membership, led by William Morris, departed the SDF in 1884 to form the Socialist League, Quelch stayed behind, redoubling his efforts on behalf of the organisation. it was around this time that Quelch's abilities as a speaker and journalist began to fully develop.

Quelch became the full-time editor of the SDF's newspaper, Justice. He also represented the SDF on bodies including various strike committees and the Trades Union Congress, and at socialist conferences across Europe. He was heavily involved in the London dock strike of 1889, and was the main organiser and first general secretary of the South Side Labour Protection League, a union for dock workers founded after the strike. He was elected several times as the chair of the London Trades Council, and was one of the founders of the Labour Representation Committee. From 1892 until the end of 1908, he was also the business manager for the 20th Century Press, a radical publisher.

In 1901, Quelch arranged for the SDF to print Vladimir Lenin's newspaper Iskra which had been banned in Russia. A thin partition was installed in a small corner of the printing works and Quelch was forced to "squeeze up" into these cramped quarters as a makeshift editorial office to make room for the Russians. There was only room for a small writing desk with a bookshelf above it and a single chair.

Quelch was a perennial representative of the British socialist movement to international gatherings of the Second International. He attended Congress of the International in Paris in 1889, Brussels in 1891, Zurich in 1893, London in 1896, Paris in 1900, Amsterdam in 1904, Stuttgart in 1907, and finally at Copenhagen in 1910.

It was as a delegate of the SDF to the 1907 Stuttgart Congress that Quelch achieved his greatest notoriety as an international socialist. There in a speech he condemned an international conference of diplomats then sitting at The Hague, attended by Tsar Nicholas II, as a "thieves' supper." Government authorities were swift in expelling Quelch from the country for his remarks, an action which boosted British esteem in the eyes of their radical peers.

=== Death and legacy ===
Harry Quelch was chronically ill from about the beginning of 1912 until his death in London on 17 September 1913, at the age of 55. Sanitariums and bracing sea air proved insufficient to cure whatever the illness from which he suffered. His funeral was a political event, attended by socialists from all over the country. He was buried at Camberwell Old Cemetery, Southwark, on Saturday, 20 September.

Lenin remembered his friend with a memorial article published in the Bolshevik newspapers Pravda Truda [Labour Truth] and Nash Put' [Our Path]:

Harry Quelch was one of the most energetic and devoted workers in the British Social-Democratic movement. He was active not only as a Social-Democratic Party worker, but also as a trade unionist. The London Society of Compositors repeatedly elected him its chairman, and he was several times Chairman of the London Trades Council.

He took a very active part in all the work of the British Social-Democratic movement and regularly addressed party and public meetings. On many occasions he represented British Social-Democracy at international congresses and on the International Socialist Bureau.

Quelch was in the front ranks of those who fought steadfastly and with conviction against opportunism and a liberal-labour policy in the British working class movement.... [O]ver the whole of Britain the Social-Democrats, and they alone, have for decades been carrying on systematic propaganda and agitation in the Marxist spirit. This is the great historical service rendered by Quelch and his comrades.

== Footnotes ==
Media offices
Preceded by Henry Hyndman	Editor of Justice; 1886–89	Succeeded by Henry Hyndman
Preceded by Henry Hyndman	Editor of Justice; 1891–1913	Succeeded by Henry W. Lee
Trade union offices
Preceded by Joe Gregory	Chairman of the London Trades Council; 1904–1906	Succeeded by Harry Gosling
Preceded by Harry Gosling	Chairman of the London Trades Council; 1910–1913	Succeeded by John Stokes
