= Scottish Amicable Building Society =

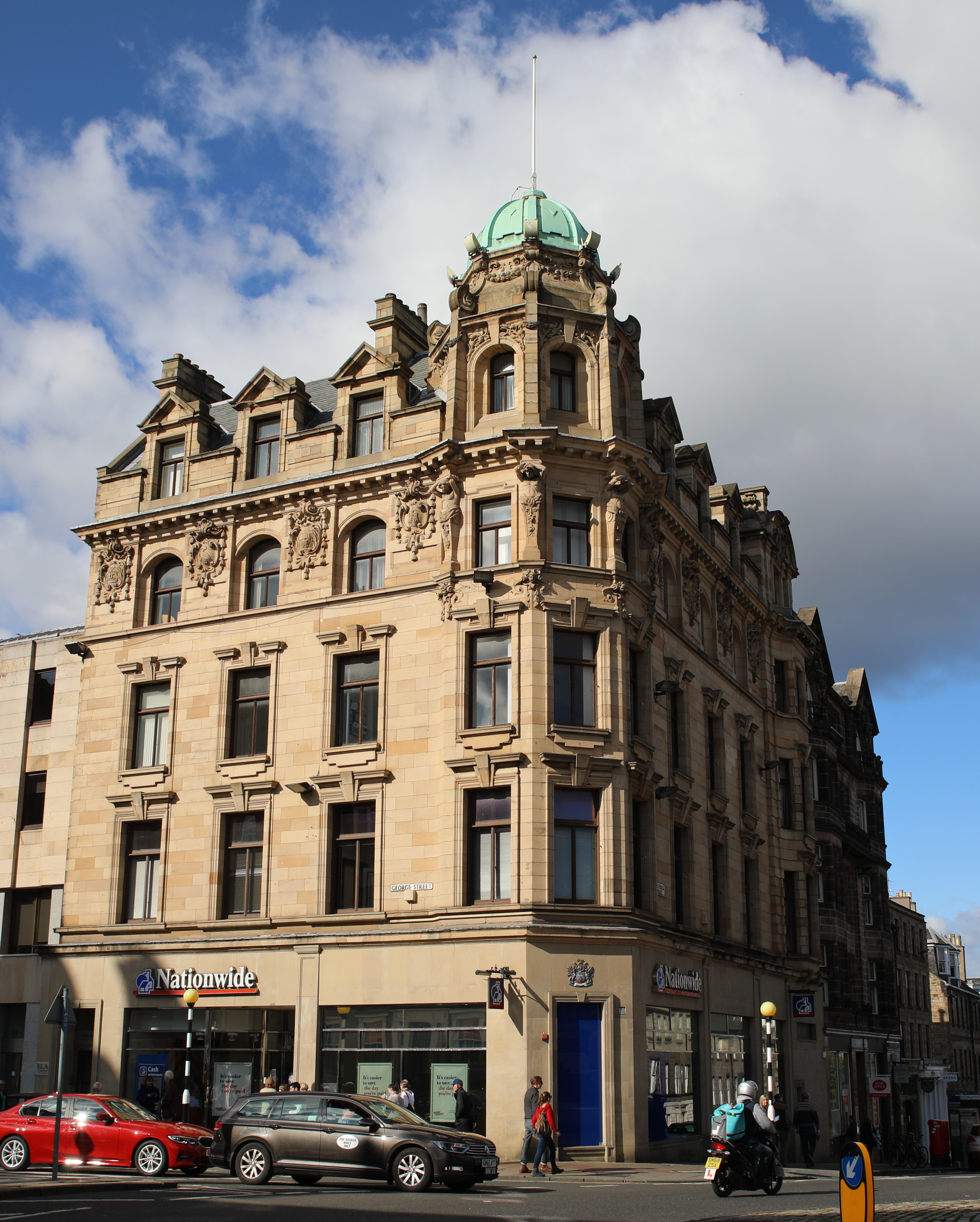
- The former head office at 71 George Street in Edinburgh
- Founded: 1892
- Defunct: 1958
- Fate: Rescued by the Co-operative Permanent Building Society
- Headquarters: Edinburgh, Scotland

The Scottish Amicable Building Society was founded in 1892 and became Scotland's largest building society with coverage across the United Kingdom. It faced a run on its funds in 1958 and was rescued by the Co-operative Building Society.

== History ==
The Society was founded in Edinburgh in 1892 as the Amicable Property Investment Building Society, later shortened to the Scottish Amicable Building Society. It remained of very modest size until after WWI – in 1922 there were only 416 members and assets totalled £86,000. The subsequent growth in the Society stemmed from the recruitment of William Allison in 1921 as manager. Allison had been a principal lecturer in business studies and joined as manager, becoming managing director and chairman. At the time of the Diamond Jubilee brochure in 1952 he was still chairman and managing director (with his son as Deputy Managing Director). By that date the Society had around 53,000 members and assets had grown to £18m. The coverage across the United Kingdom was extensive. There were district offices in Aberdeen, Ayr, Glasgow, Dundee, London, Birmingham, Liverpool and Manchester; beneath those were 13 chief branches offices in Scotland, 14 in England and one in Belfast followed by a further 104 ordinary branches. It was later described as Scotland's largest building society.

Six years after the Society celebrated its Diamond Jubilee, it had to be rescued by the Co-operative Permanent Building Society. Ashworth described the Scottish Amicable as “a well-educated and sound society whose only trouble was that it made investments in undated and long-dated gilt-edged securities that had fallen in value owing to the rise in interest rates”. Its assets had risen to £25m but press comments indicated that the depreciation in the investments exceeded the reserve funds of the Society and there was “a flood of withdrawal notices” which the Society was unable to meet.

The society established a new head office at 71 George Street in Edinburgh in October 1931.
