= International Socialist Workers and Trade Union Congress, London 1896 =

4th Congress of the Second International

The International Socialist Workers and Trade Union Congress held in London from July 26 to August 1, 1896 was the fourth congress of the Second International. The congress has been described as "the most agitated, the most tumultuous, and the most chaotic of all the congresses of the Second International" because of the many factional disputes between and within the national delegations.

The congress was the only one of the Second International to have its proceedings published in English. The chairman was Henry Hyndman.

Country	# of delegates	Notes
Germany	48	Representing the Social Democratic Party
Great Britain	475	Representing the Social Democratic Federation, Fabian Society, Miners' Federation of Great Britain
Austria	6	
Australia	1	The Australians had deputized a London doctor to represent them Represented the Australian Socialist League.
Bohemia	1	
Bulgaria	4	
Belgium	19	
Denmark	7	
Spain	6	
United States	7	
France	129	
Netherlands	13	
Hungary	3	
Italy	13	
Poland	13	
Portugal	1	
Romania	1	
Russia	7	
Sweden	2	
Switzerland	12	

== Resolutions ==
The Congress passed resolutions on the Agrarian question, political action, education, the position of the working class regarding militarism, the industrial question and the further organization of social democracy. It also passed motions regarding the independence of Cuba, Macedonia and Armenia, tsarism, monarchism, and adopted a special address from the Bulgarian Social Democrats.
