= Co-operative Permanent Building Society =

Mutual building society, providing mortgages and savings accounts to its members

- Company type: Building Society (Mutual)
- Founded: 1884
- Defunct: 1970
- Fate: Change of name
- Successor: Nationwide Building Society
- Headquarters: London, United Kingdom

The Co-operative Permanent Building Society was a mutual building society, providing mortgages and savings accounts to its members. Its head office was located at New Oxford House in London. In 1970, it was renamed the Nationwide Building Society.

== History ==
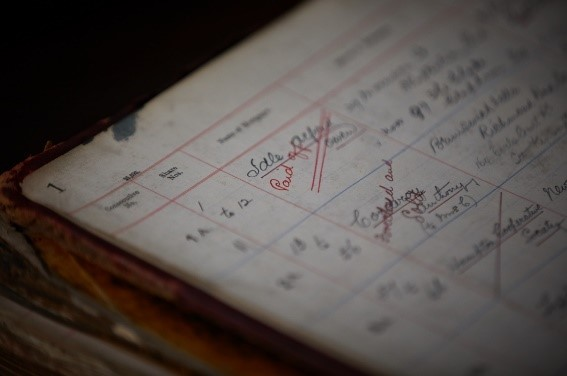
The first mortgage ledger of the Southern Co-operative Permanent Building Society

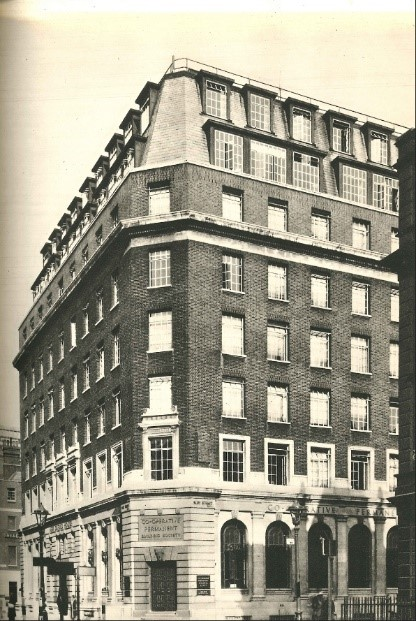
New Oxford House in London 1929

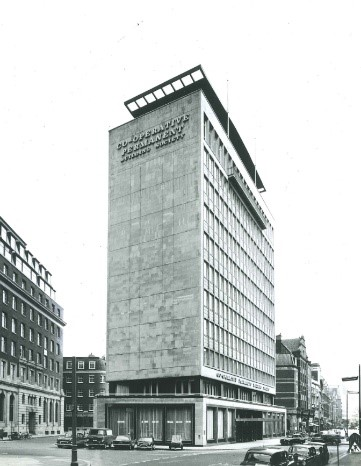
New Oxford House in High Holborn, opened by the Duke of Hamilton and Brandon

The Southern Co-operative Permanent Building Society was formed in 1884, initially to provide a service to the members of the co-operative movement, enabling them to own their own properties. To begin with the Society built the houses but soon changed its direction to lend money to members for them to build their own or purchase existing properties. Competition soon began between societies and members from outside the movement joined.

Through rapid expansion and strategic planning the Society soon grew to become a major competitor and by 1943 it was fifth largest in the United Kingdom with assets of £32,724,112.

In 1970, it was renamed the Nationwide Building Society.

=== Transfers of engagements ===
Date	Society	Assets	Ref.
1918	Bournemouth, Hants & Dorset Building Society	—	
June 1942	Whitehall Building Society	£141,671	
September 1942	Southampton & South Hants Building Society	£130,566	
October 1942	The Institute Permanent Benefit Building Society	£242,225	
December 1942	Finsbury Building Society	£430,029	
December 1942	Nineteenth Building Society	£313,612	
February 1943	Wandsworth Building Society	£334,603	
February 1943	Kensington Permanent Benefit Building Society	£84,538	
February 1943	Great Torrington Building Society	£217,275	
June 1943	Bournemouth Working Men's Building Society	£66,236	
November 1943	Lombardian Permanent Benefit Building Society	£75,171	
April 1944	Western Equitable Permanent Mutual Benefit Building Society	£20,540	
May 1944	Thames Estuary Building Society	£303,311	
February 1945	Picadilly Permanent Building Society	£30,485	
July 1946	Rock (Llanelly) Permanent Building Society	£33,795	
April 1947	Middlesex Building Society	£14,515	
October 1951	Empire Benefit Building Society	£93,999	
February 1956	Exeter Benefit Building Society	£3,624,142	
September 1956	Merthyr & Dowlais Permanent Benefit Building Society	£14,684	
June 1958	Scottish Amicable Building Society	£22,578,901	
September 1963	British Co-operative Building Society	£21,046	
June 1966	Coleraine Building Society	£301,539	

== Arms ==
Coat of arms of Co-operative Permanent Building Society
Notes The Shield is divided per chevron Azure and Or in allusion to the Pyramid which was the Emblem of the Society for many years. The Castle refers to the "Englishman's Home", and is built upon a rock, this being the security afforded by the society. The Dragon is, of course, the guardian of the treasure, and also emphasises the feeling of security which all may enjoy who invest in the Society. The Keys stand for house ownership. There are four of them together with the National Emblems of England, Scotland, Ireland, and Wales to show that the Society's activities cover those four countries. The Cockatrice is a combination of a Cock and a Dragon, the former representing the homestead, the latter being the guardian of the Treasure; the one provides the home which is represented by the other. The Escutcheon is taken from the Arms of the Borough of Holborn, to represent the Headquarters of the Society. Adopted 27 September 1954 Crest Four Keys wards upwards and outwards in saltire Or enfiled by A Chaplet of Daffodils proper, Roses Gules and Thistles and Shamrock also proper. Escutcheon Per chevron Azure and Or in chief on a Rock proper a triple towered Castle Gold and in base a Dragon couchant wings elevated and addorsed Gules. Supporters On either side a Cockatrice Argent combed wattled and armed Gules each gorged with a Collar or pendent therefrom an Escutcheon barry wavy of ten, also Argent and Azure. Motto STEP BY STEP

== See also ==
- British co-operative movement
- History of the cooperative movement
- Arthur Webb (co-operator)
- Albert Mansbridge, Brick upon Brick Co-operative Permanent Building Society 1884-1934, 1934, London
