= Charles Fitzgerald (rugby union, born 1879) =

Irish rugby union player

- Full name: Charles Conway Fitzgerald
- Born: 1 August 1879 Lurgan, County Armagh, Ireland
- Died: 10 February 1958 (aged 78) Downpatrick, County Down, Northern Ireland
- School: Royal School Dungannon
- University: University of Glasgow

Rugby union career
- Position: Wing
International career
Years	Team	Apps	(Points)
1902–03	Ireland	3	(0)

Charles Conway Fitzgerald (1 August 1879 – 10 February 1958) was an Irish international rugby union player.

Born in Lurgan, County Armagh, Fitzgerald attended the Royal School Dungannon and studied medicine at the University of Glasgow. He played rugby in his youth and was capped three times for Ireland as a wing three-quarter.

Fitzgerald served as an officer in the Royal Army Medical Corps and Royal Flying Corps during World War I.

== See also ==
- List of Ireland national rugby union players
