= Ernest Belfort Bax =

English barrister, journalist, philosopher, socialist and historian (1854–1926)

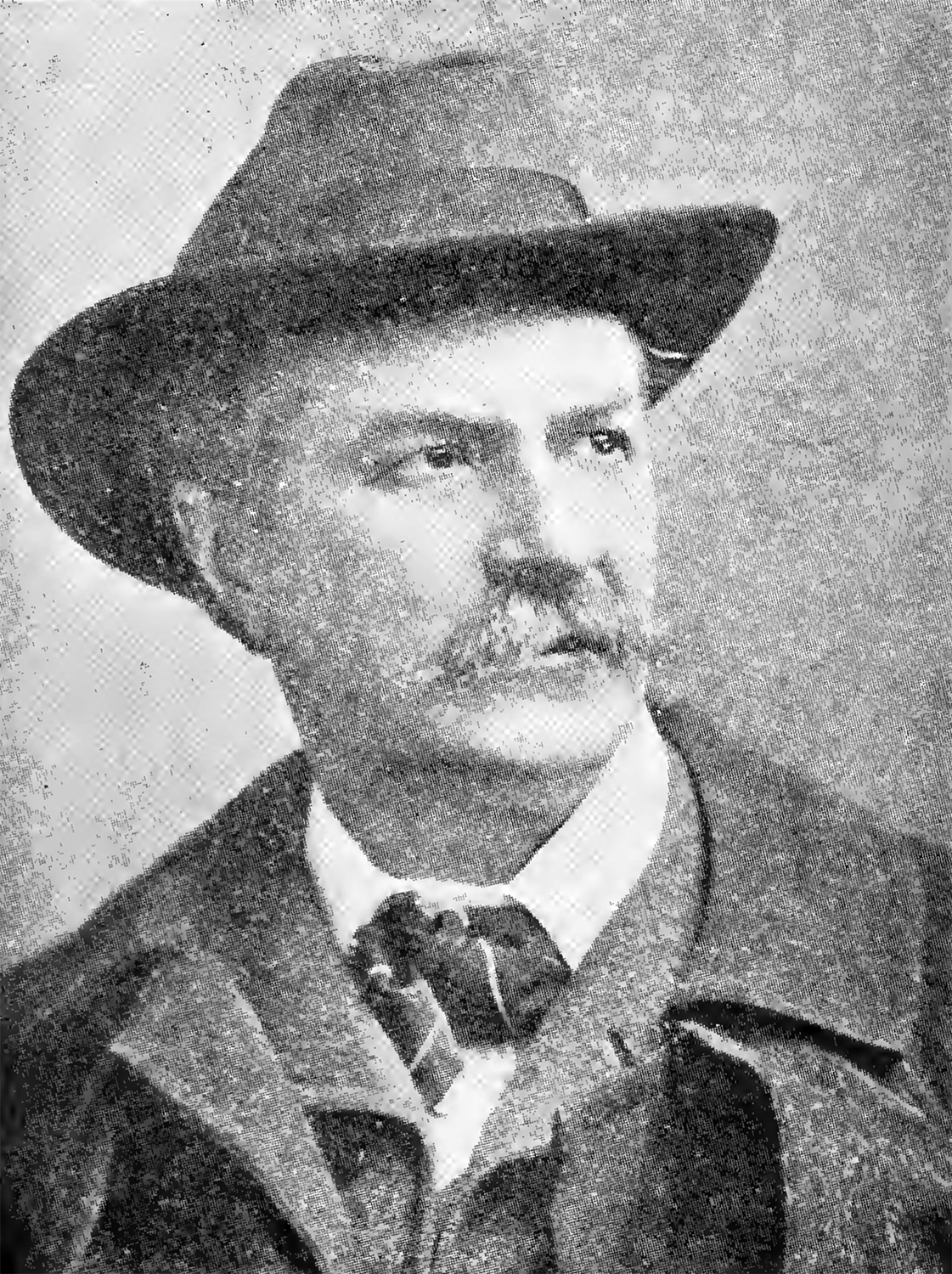
- Bax c. 1905
- Born: 23 July 1854; Leamington Spa, Warwickshire, UK
- Died: 26 November 1926 (aged 72)
- Occupation: Barrister
- Known for: Men's rights, Socialism
- Notable work: The Legal Subjection of Men (1896)

Ernest Belfort Bax (/bæks/; 23 July 1854 – 26 November 1926) was an English barrister, journalist, philosopher, men's rights advocate, socialist, and historian.

== Biography ==
Ernest Belfort Bax was born on 23 July 1854, in Leamington Spa, son of Daniel Bax, a wealthy Mackintosh raincoat manufacturer and traditionalist nonconformist. Bax's elder brother, barrister Alfred Ridley Bax, was father of the composer and writer Arnold Bax and the playwright and essayist Clifford Bax. In his Reminiscences and Reflexions of a Mid and Late Victorian (1918), he describes the narrow Evangelicanism and Sabbatarianism in which he was brought up which he describes as having left "an enduringly unpleasant reminiscence behind it".

He was privately educated by tutors between the years 1864–1875, and influenced by George Lewes, William Lecky, Alexander Bain, Herbert Spencer and John Stuart Mill, which contributed to his dedication to rationalism. At the age of sixteen his interest in public affairs was awakened by the Franco-German War and the Paris Commune. His political ideas during this period amounted to a commonplace radicalism combined with aspirations to economic equality.

In his youth Bax had an interest in music and could play the piano, and at the age of 21 (1875) he went to Germany to study music. He visited there again in 1880 as Berlin correspondent of The Standard. It was then that he met with Eduard von Hartmann and came into contact with German philosophy in general. After studying for a period, his interest in Mill, Spencer and Bain yielded to the German greats Kant and Hegel, and his philosophical interests remained with him for life.

== Studies in philosophy ==
In 1880 at the age of 26, Bax began studying philosophy in Germany, beginning with Kant and Hegel. In 1883 he produced an English translation of Kant's Prolegomena, and Metaphysical Foundations of Natural Science, and in 1884 he wrote his Handbook to the History of Philosophy, which was published in 1885 for Bohn's Philosophical Library.

Later philosophical works by Bax include The Problem of Reality (1892), The Roots of Reality: Being Suggestions for a Philosophical Reconstruction (1907), Problems of Men, Mind and Morals (1912), and The Real, The Rational, and The Alogical (1920).

== Men's rights advocacy ==
Bax was a passionate advocate for the social and legal rights of men, which he saw as lacking in comparison to the legal rights of women. His first major article on the subject was "Some Bourgeois Idols; Or Ideals, Reals, and Shams" (1886), in which he proposed that women were privileged under law at the expense of men. He was to continue writing articles on this topic for most of his life, published notably in Social Democrat, and Justice, and later in The New Age.

In 1896, he wrote The Legal Subjection of Men whose title is a play on John Stuart Mill's 1869 essay "The Subjection of Women." In the volume, Bax draws on his extensive experience as a barrister to demonstrate the numerous ways in which the legal code favoured women to the detriment of men and boys. Chapters in the book include 'Matrimonial Privileges of Women', 'Non-Matrimonial Privileges of Women', 'The Actual Exercise of Women's Sex Privileges', and 'A Sex Noblesse'.

"The most elaborate cruelty in the way of insolence and insult is unpunishable by the law when committed by the wife. The husband remains bound to support his torturer, who may publicly waylay and insult him, harass him at his work, procure his dismissal, libel him by postcards sent to his workshop, or to his club. If he be a rich man, he can get some tardy redress in the way of palliation; but he remains liable to divorce and expropriation at his wife's behest. Now the feminine noblesse can torture their slaves with impunity. If the husband retaliates, the magistrate's order promptly consigns him to gaol and the prisoners' lash."

Bax was an active antifeminist since, according to him, feminism was failing to address inequities for both sexes evenly. According to Bax, the "anti-man crusades" of his day were responsible for anti-man laws being both preserved from the old legal canon, and for new laws being passed that were also anti-male and sexist. Bax wrote many articles in The New Age and elsewhere about English laws partial to women against men, and women's privileged position before the law, and expressed his view that women's suffrage would unfairly tip the balance of power to women. In 1913 he published a book, The Fraud of Feminism, critiquing feminism. In it, he described chivalry as "the deprivation, the robbery from men of the most elementary personal rights in order to endow women with privileges at the expense of men."

Bax's concern for men's equality fuelled his interest in socialism, to which he turned for a potential solution to what he viewed as the exploitation of males by the capitalist system:

"The highest development of modern capitalism, as exemplified in the English-speaking countries, has placed man to all intents and purposes, legally under the heel of woman. So far as the relations of the sexes are concerned, it would be the task of Socialism to emancipate man from this position, if sex-equality be the goal aimed at. The first step on the road towards such equality would necessarily consist in the abolition of modern female privilege."

== Socialism ==
Bax was first introduced to socialism while studying philosophy in Germany in 1879. He combined socialist ideas with those of Immanuel Kant, Arthur Schopenhauer and Eduard von Hartmann. Keen to explore possible metaphysical and ethical implications of socialism, he came to describe a "religion of socialism" as a means to overcome the dichotomy between the personal and the social, and also that between the cognitive and the emotional. He saw this as a replacement for organised religion, and was a fervent atheist, keen to free workers from what he saw as the moralism of the middle-class.

Bax moved to Berlin and worked as a journalist on the Evening Standard. On his return to England in 1882, he joined the Social Democratic Federation, but grew disillusioned and in 1885 left to form the Socialist League with William Morris. After anarchists gained control of the League, he rejoined the SDF, and became the chief theoretician, and editor of the party paper Justice. He opposed the party's participation in the Labour Representation Committee, and eventually persuaded them to leave.

Almost throughout his life, he saw economic conditions as ripe for socialism, but felt this progress was delayed by a lack of education of the working class. Bax supported Karl Kautsky over Eduard Bernstein, but Kautsky had little time for what he saw as Bax's utopianism, and supported Theodore Rothstein's efforts to spread a more orthodox Marxism in the SDF. Bax also opposed the reform minded policies of the Fabian Society.

Initially very anti-nationalist, Bax came to support the British in World War I, but by this point he was concentrating on his career as a barrister and did little political work.

== Historian ==
As well as his contributions to philosophy, men's rights, and socialism, Bax published several in depth historical studies of individuals, and cultures. He records in his Reminiscences that he always felt, from childhood on, the need of an intelligible doctrine of history.

Among his historical works are: Jean-Paul Marat: The People's Friend (1879), German Society at the Close of the Middle Ages (1894), The Social Side of the Reformation in Germany (1894), The Peasants' War in Germany (1899), The Rise and Fall of the Anabaptists (1903), The Last Episode of the French Revolution (1911), and German Culture Past and Present (1913).

== Works ==
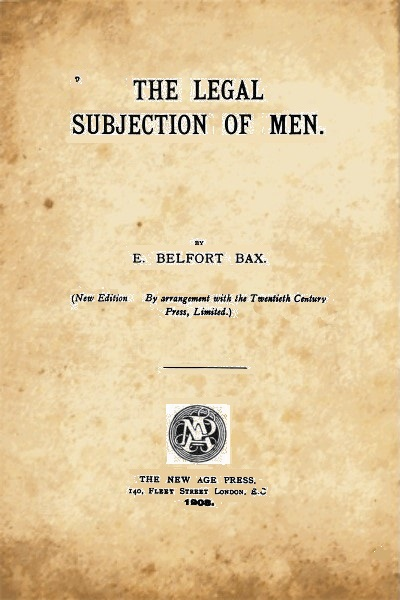
Inside cover of Legal Subjection of Men, first published 1896

He wrote the following books on various subjects:

- Jean-Paul Marat: A Historico-Biographical Sketch (1882)
- A Handbook of the History of Philosophy (1886)
- A Short Account of the Commune of Paris of 1871, with Victor Dave & William Morris (1886)
- Religion of Socialism (1886)
- The Story of The French Revolution (1890)
- Outlooks From a New Standpoint (1891)
- The Problem of Reality (1893)
- The Ethics of Socialism (1893)
- German Society at the Close of The Middle Ages (1894)
- A Short History of The Paris Commune (1894)
- Socialism; Its Growth and Outcome, with William Morris (1894)
- The Legal Subjection of Men (1896 with Twentieth Century Press) with an unnamed Irish barrister, (republished in 1908 with New Age Press).
- The Peasants War in Germany (1899)
- Jean-Paul Marat: The People's Friend (1901)
- The Rise and Fall of the Anabaptists (1900)
- A New Catechism of Socialism, with Harry Quelch (1903)
- Essays in Socialism, New and Old (1906)
- The Roots of Reality (1908)
- The Last Episode of the French Revolution: Being a History of Gracchus Babeuf and the Conspiracy of the Equals (1911)
- Problems of Men, Mind, and Morals (1912)
- The Fraud of Feminism (1913)
- Reminiscences and Reflexions of a mid and late Victorian (1918)
- German Culture Past and Present (1915)
