= James MacDonald (trade unionist) =

British trade unionist

James MacDonald (1857 – 21 May 1938) was a British trade unionist.

Born in Edinburgh, MacDonald trained as a tailor and moved to London in 1881. He joined the Central Marylebone Democratic Association and the Manhood Suffrage League, but it was reading Friedrich Engels' articles in the Labour Standard that convinced him of socialism. As a result, he joined the Social Democratic Federation (SDF), but left in 1885 to join the Socialist Union. However, he rejoined the SDF in 1887.

In 1888, MacDonald worked with Lewis Lyons to unite both East End and West End tailors, which became the Amalgamated Society of Tailors. He then founded a newspaper, Journeyman, and joined the Independent Labour Party (ILP).

In 1891, MacDonald was elected to the executive of the London Trades Council, and in 1896 he became its secretary, a post he held until 1913. Despite being based in London, he twice stood for Parliament in Dundee as an ILP candidate, failing to win a seat. He also spent some time on the Parliamentary Committee of the Trades Union Congress and in 1893 successfully proposed an amendment requiring it to support only those Labour candidates who accepted the principle of collective ownership.

In 1898, MacDonald organised merger talks between the SDF and ILP, but these proved unsuccessful, the ILP withdrawing. Increasingly radical, in 1900 he proposed a motion that the ILP should be an organisation of class war, but this was voted down. He was also elected to the first Labour Representation Committee (LRC) as a representative of the SDF. Some reports claimed that Ramsay MacDonald was elected Secretary of the LRC in part because he was confused with James, although Arthur Henderson strongly denied that this was the case.

MacDonald launched the London Trades and Labour Gazette in 1901, editing it until 1913. Initially publishing it personally, it became the official journal of the London Trades Council in 1903.

In 1905, he left the Amalgamated Society of Tailors to found the London Society of Tailors and Tailoresses. He later retired to Australia, but returned to the UK a few years before his death.

Trade union offices
Preceded by George Shipton	Secretary of the London Trades Council; 1896–1913	Succeeded by Fred Knee
