= Amie Hicks =

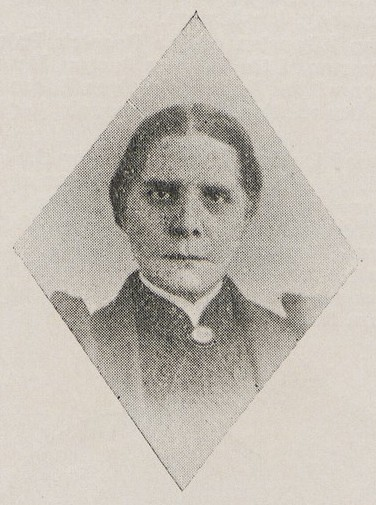
Amie Hicks as depicted in Program of 1899 International Congress of Women at which she was a representative.

Amelia Jane Hicks (26 February 1839 – 5 February 1917), nee Cox, known as Amie Hicks, was a British suffragist, trade unionist and socialist activist.

Born in Southwark, to Richard George Cox, a bootmaker, and his wife Harriet, Hicks grew up in the house of her uncle, Thomas Francis Dicksee. She returned to live with her father when she was fourteen, helping run his business. By the age of 25, she was married to William Hicks with three children, and the family moved to New Zealand. However, the move was unsuccessful, and they returned to England a few years later. The 1881 census gives her profession as a certified midwife. She and William had eight children in all, but two died young.

Inspired by her father's experience in the Chartist movement, Hicks joined the Democratic Federation in 1883, along with her husband and her daughter, Margaretta. She soon became known within the organisation for her focus on women's suffrage. She was elected to the executive council of the renamed Social Democratic Federation (SDF) in 1884, serving for a year.

Hicks stood for the London School Board in 1885 and 1888, although she was not elected. In 1889, she founded the East London Ropemakers' Women, which represented poorly paid women, and through it she became prominent in the Women's Trade Union Association, and its successor, the Women's Industrial Council. In 1894, she joined the Trades Union Congress' delegation to the American Federation of Labour, with John Burns and David Holmes. She was struck by illness and so was unable to participate in the convention once she arrived, but she later addressed various meetings.

Hicks was also a member of the National Union of Women Workers, the central National Society for Women's Suffrage, and the Women's Emancipation Union. In 1896, she worked closely with Charlotte Perkins Gilman, who toured the UK giving speeches on women's suffrage. She resigned from the Women's Industrial Council in 1908 to focus on her work with the Clubs' Industrial Association and, later, the National Organisation of Girls' Clubs. She remained involved with the SDF, and in 1914 was appointed as the women's organiser of its successor, the British Socialist Party.
