= Henry Hyndman =

English writer and politician (1842–1921)

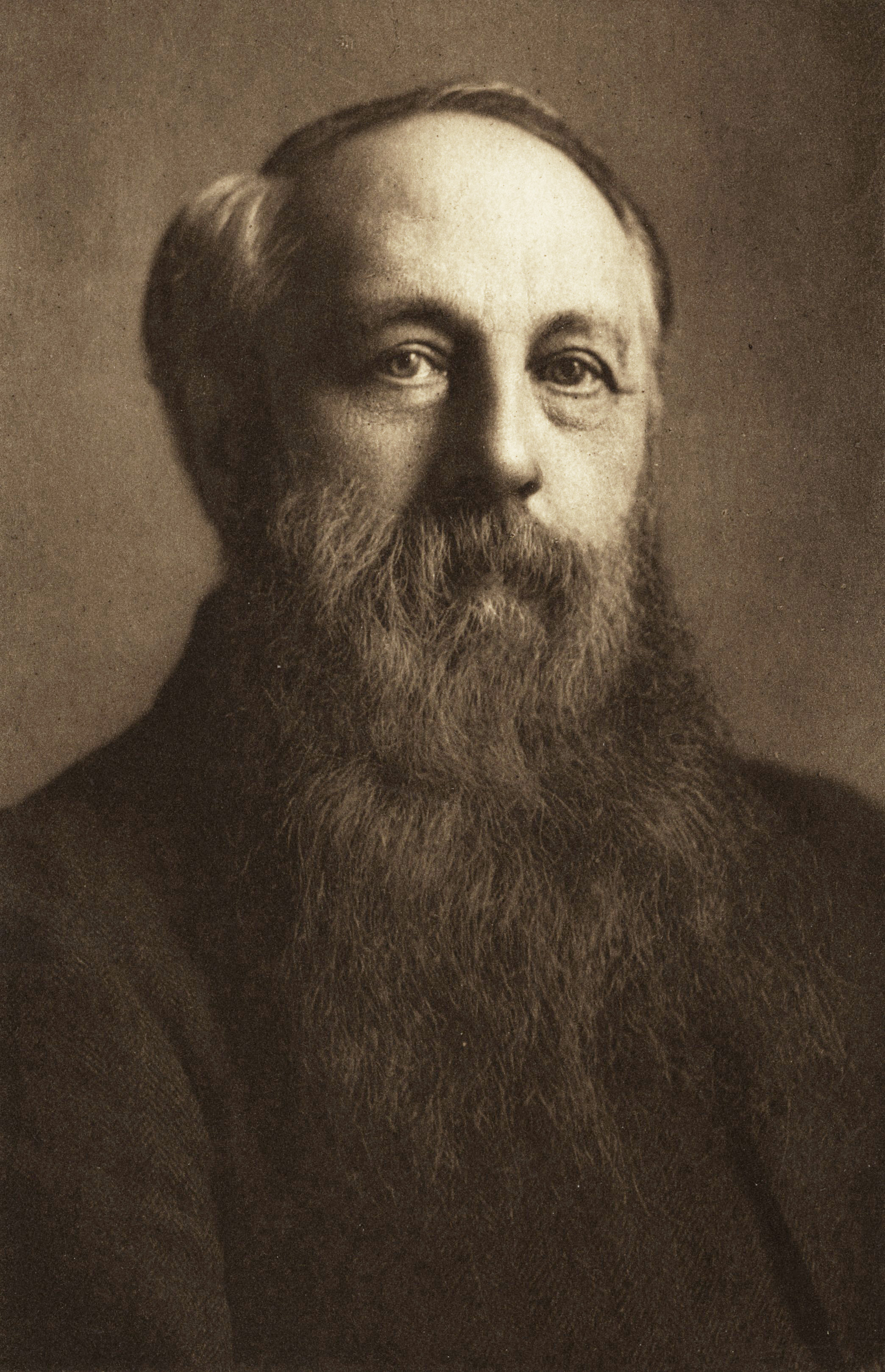
- Hyndman c. 1911

Leader of the National Socialist Party
- In office 1916 – 22 November 1921 (his death)
- Preceded by: Party established

Leader of the British Socialist Party
- In office 1911 – 1915
- Preceded by: Party established
- Succeeded by: Dan Irving

Leader of the Social Democratic Federation
- In office 7 June 1881 – 1911

Personal details
- Born: Henry Mayers Hyndman; 7 March 1842 London, England
- Died: 22 November 1921 (aged 79) Hampstead, England
- Party: Conservative (until 1881); Social Democratic Federation (1881–1911); British Socialist Party (1911–1916); National Socialist Party (1916–1921)
- Spouse(s): Matilda Ware (m. 1876; died 1913) Rosalind Travers (m. 1914)
- Education: Trinity College, Cambridge

Henry Mayers Hyndman (/ˈhaɪndmən/; 7 March 1842 – 22 November 1921) was an English writer, politician and socialist.

Originally a conservative, he was converted to socialism by Karl Marx's Communist Manifesto and launched Britain's first socialist political party, the Democratic Federation, later known as the Social Democratic Federation, in 1881.

Although this body attracted radicals such as William Morris and George Lansbury, Hyndman was generally disliked as an authoritarian who could not unite his party. Nonetheless, Hyndman was the first author to popularise Marx's works in English.

== Early life ==
The son of a wealthy businessman, Hyndman was born on 7 March 1842 in London. After being educated at home, he entered Trinity College, Cambridge. Hyndman later recalled:

I had the ordinary education of a well-to-do boy and young man. I read mathematics hard until I went to Cambridge, where I ought, of course, to have read them harder, and then I gave them up altogether and devoted myself to amusement and general literature. ... Trinity or, for that matter, any other college, is practically a hot-bed of reaction from the social point of view. The young men regard all who are not technically "gentlemen" as "cads," just as the Athenians counted all who were not Greeks as barbarians. I was a thorough-going Radical and Republican in those days—theoretically ... with a great admiration for John Stuart Mill, and later, I remember, I regarded John Morley as the coming man.

After his graduation in 1865, Hyndman studied law for two years before deciding to become a journalist. As a first-class cricketer, he represented Cambridge University, Marylebone Cricket Club (MCC) and Sussex in thirteen matches as a right-handed batsman between 1864 and 1865.

In 1866, Hyndman reported on the Italian war with Austria for The Pall Mall Gazette. Hyndman was horrified by the reality of war and became violently ill after visiting the front line. Hyndman met the leaders of the Italian nationalist movement and was generally sympathetic to their cause.

In 1869, Hyndman toured the world, visiting the United States, Australia and several European countries. He continued to write for The Pall Mall Gazette, where he praised the British Empire and criticised those advocating for Irish Home Rule. Hyndman was also very opposed to politics of the United States.

Hyndman married Matilda Ware (c. 1846–1913) in 1876 and then Rosalind Travers (c. 1875–1923) in 1914.

== Political career ==
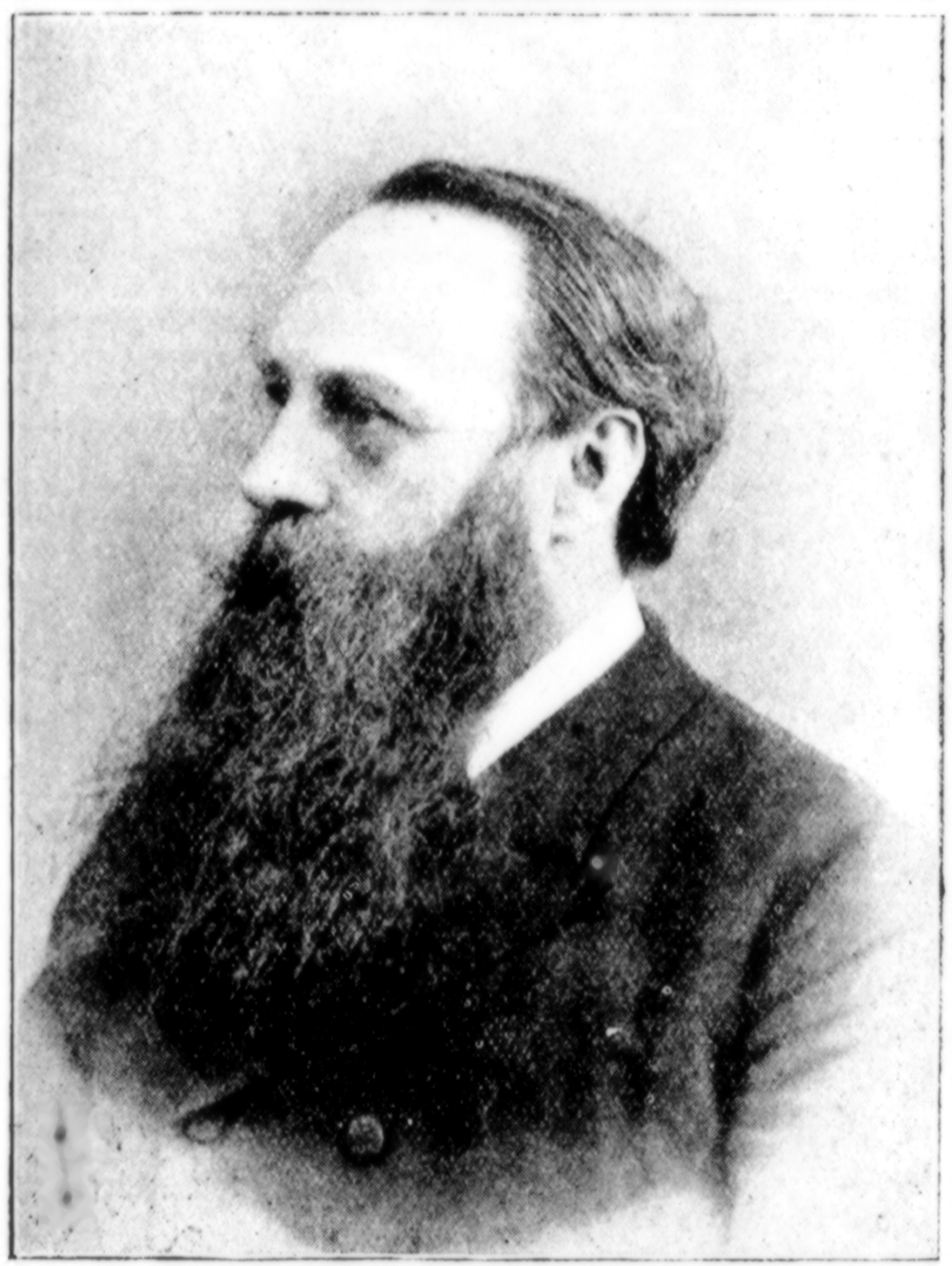
Hyndman, c. 1895

Hyndman decided on a career in politics. Unable to find a party that he could fully support, he decided to stand as an independent for the constituency of Marylebone in the 1880 general election. Denounced as a Tory by William Ewart Gladstone, Hyndman gained very limited support from the electorate and withdrew from the contest, facing certain defeat.

Soon after the election, Hyndman read a novel based on the life of Ferdinand Lassalle. He became fascinated with Lassalle and decided to research this romantic hero who had been killed in a duel in 1864. Discovering that Lassalle had been a socialist, sometimes a friend and sometimes an adversary of Karl Marx, Hyndman read The Communist Manifesto. Although he had doubts about some of Marx's ideas, Hyndman was greatly impressed by his analysis of capitalism.

Hyndman was also greatly influenced by the book Progress and Poverty and the ideology of Henry George known today as Georgism.

Hyndman decided to form Britain's first socialist political party. The Social Democratic Federation (SDF) had its first meeting on 7 June 1881. Many socialists were concerned that in the past Hyndman had been opposed to socialist ideas, but Hyndman persuaded many that he had genuinely changed his views and those who eventually joined the SDF included William Morris and Karl Marx's daughter Eleanor Marx. However, Friedrich Engels, Marx's long-term collaborator, refused to support Hyndman's venture.

Hyndman wrote the first popularisation of the ideas of Karl Marx in the English language with England for All in 1881. The book was extremely successful, a fact that stoked Marx's antipathy, given the fact that he had failed to credit Marx by name in the introduction. The work was followed in 1883 by Socialism Made Plain which expounded the policies of what by then had been renamed as the SDF. They included a demand for universal suffrage and the nationalisation of the means of production and distribution. The SDF also published Justice, edited by the journalist Henry Hyde Champion.

Many members of the SDF questioned Hyndman's leadership qualities. He was extremely authoritarian and tried to restrict internal debate about party policy. At an SDF meeting on 27 December 1884, the executive voted by a majority of two (10–8) that it had no confidence in Hyndman. When he refused to resign, some members, including William Morris and Eleanor Marx, left the party, forming the Socialist League.

In the 1885 general election, Hyndman and Henry Hyde Champion, without consulting their colleagues, accepted £340 from the Conservatives to run parliamentary candidates in Hampstead and Kensington, the objective being to split the Liberal vote and therefore enable the Conservative candidate to win. This ploy failed and the two SDF's candidates won only a total of 59 votes. The story leaked out and the political reputation of both men suffered because they had accepted "Tory gold".

During the 1880s, Hyndman was a prominent member of the Irish National Land League and the Land League of Great Britain. He took part in the unemployed demonstrations of 1887 and was put on trial for his share in the West End Riots of 1886, but he was acquitted.

Hyndman was chairman at the International Socialist Congress held in London in 1896. He was pro-Boer during the second Boer War.

Hyndman continued to lead the SDF and took part in the negotiations to establish the Labour Representation Committee (LRC) in 1900. However, the SDF left the LRC when it became clear that it was deviating from the objectives he had set out. In 1911, he set up the British Socialist Party (BSP) when the SDF fused with a number of branches of the Independent Labour Party.

== Political thought ==
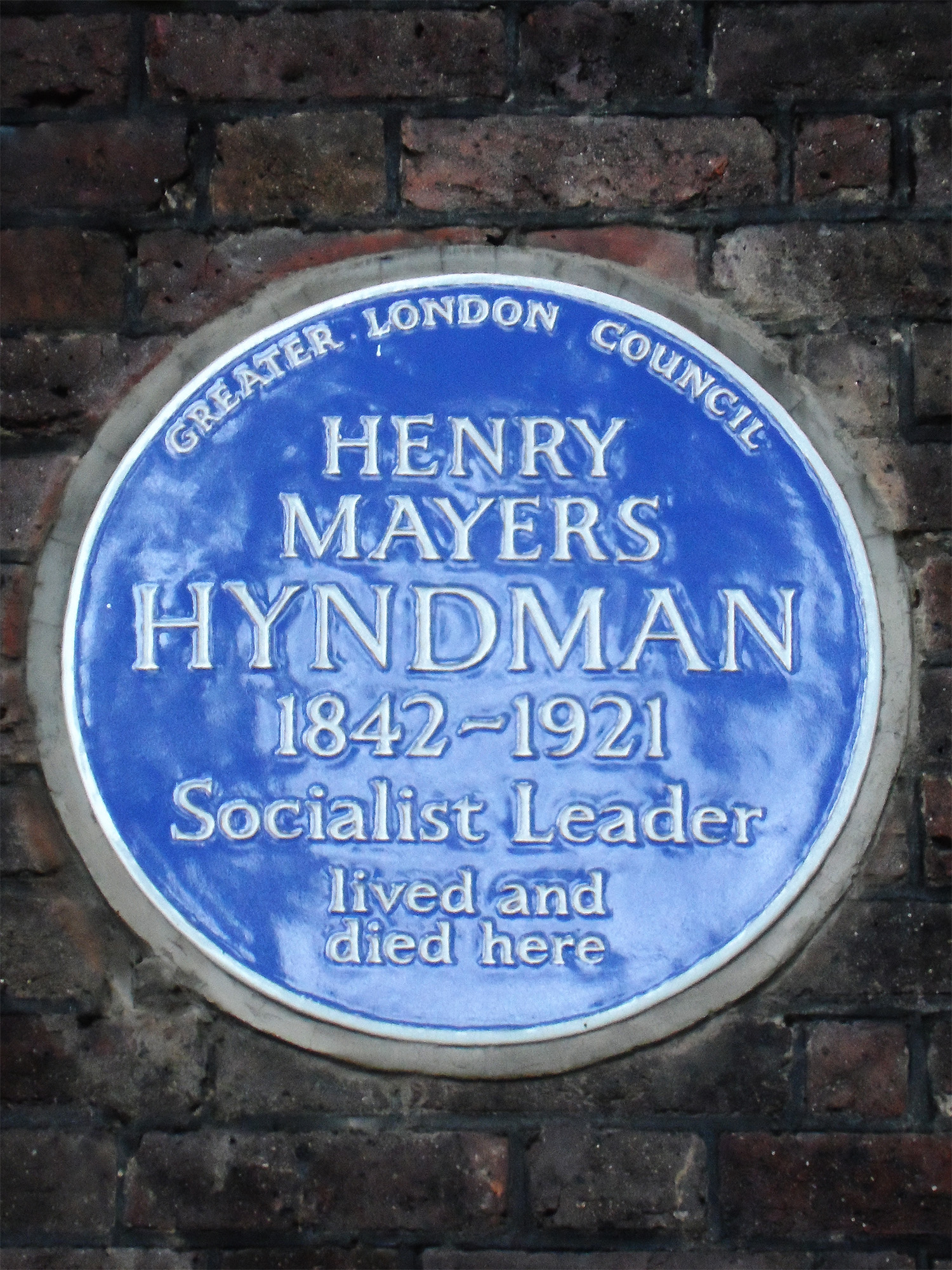
Blue plaque commemorating Hyndman in Well Walk, Hampstead

Hyndman's thought was influenced by John Stuart Mill and his protégé John Morley as well as Charles Dilke, Henry Fawcett and Giuseppe Mazzini, Karl Marx "erstwhile adversary" at the time of the First International. According to Hyndman, "Mazzini's greatness ... was obscured for younger socialists by his 'opposition to Marx in the early days of the 'International,' and his vigorous condemnation a little later of the Paris Commune", insisting that "'Mazzini's conception of the conduct of human life' had been 'a high and noble one'", praising the "No duties without rights" mention in the "General Rules" that Marx composed and passed as "a concession Marx made to Mazzini's followers within the organisation". Friedrich Engels, Marx's collaborator, "censured Hyndman's Mazzinian moralism" and also accused Hyndman of "jingo aspiration". Seamus Flaherty argues that "Hyndman's views on the beneficence of the 'great democracies of the English speaking peoples'" were inspired not by Benjamin Disraeli as historians such as Mark Bevir have argued, but rather by Dilke and Mill, whom Hyndman combined their ideas "on the unique character of 'the Angloe-Saxon race' with Mazzini's cosmopolitan patriotism, thus constructing a nationalism fully compatible with 'a good internationalism'.

In his two volume autobiography, Hyndman spoke at length about Mazzini, even comparing him to Marx. For Vladimir Lenin, "that Hyndman should do so was preposterous; more astonishing still was that Hyndman should admire Mazzini". However, Flaherty writes that "when situated within its proper context, Hyndman's 'intellectual republicanism', so far from being unintelligible, is predictable, insofar as it was characteristic of mid-Victorian liberalism. Lenin's view was anachronistic. Similarly anachronistic was Lenin's complaint that Hyndman 'very poorly understood in 1880 ... the difference between bourgeois democratic and a socialist'. For the difference was, often, not clear-cut; many socialists, including Marx, accepted the representative state. The 'association between Marx and a 'Marxist' language of revolution' was, in the main, a twentieth-century invention, which Lenin in no small part helped to create. And Marx himself, moreover, allayed Hyndman's fears about the necessity of revolution in England, stating that he considered 'an English revolution not necessary, but according to historic precedents—possible'".

== Controversy ==
=== Antisemitism ===
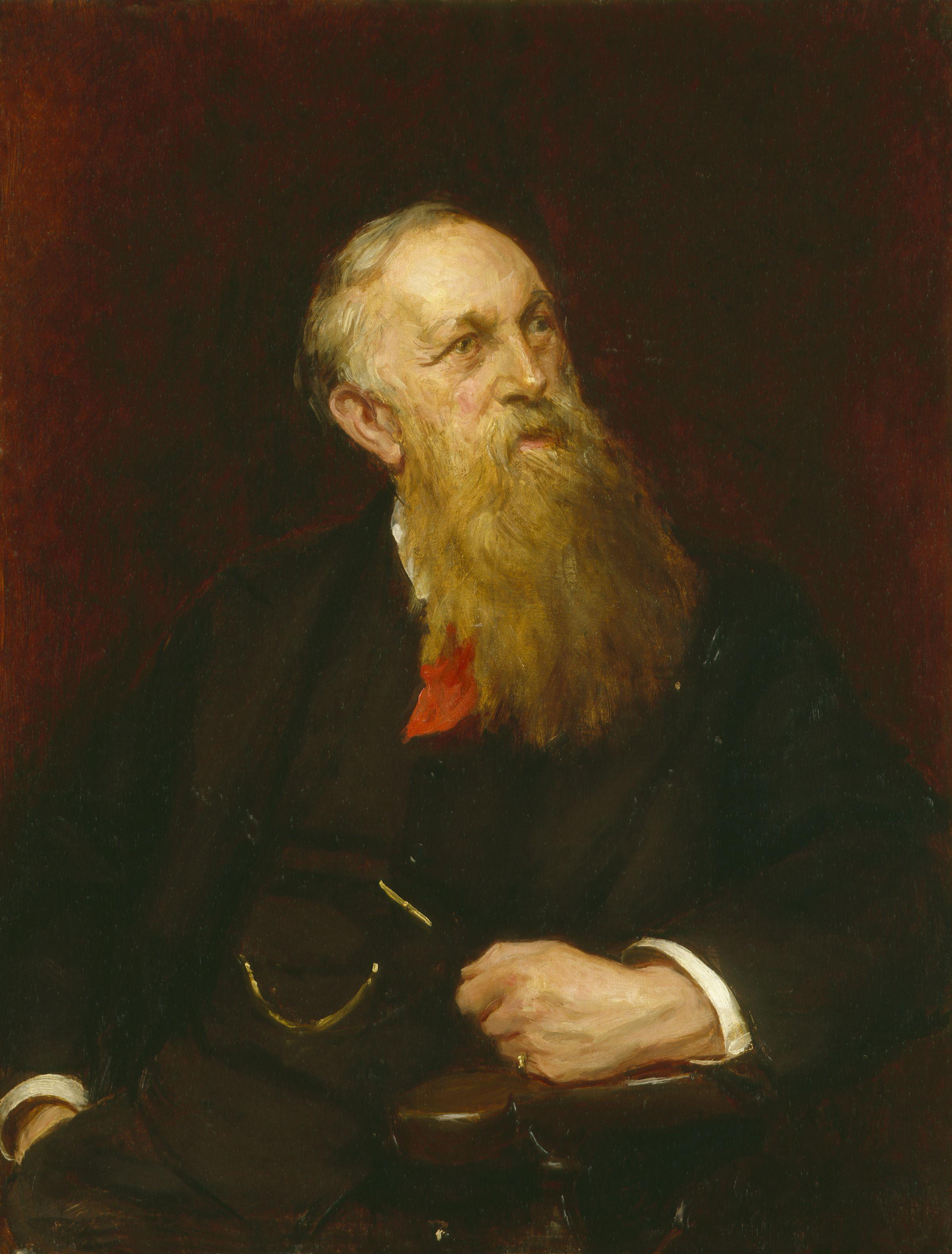
Hyndman by Sydney Prior Hall

Hyndman was an antisemite, voicing antisemitic opinions with regard to the Second Boer War and blaming "Jewish bankers" and "imperialist Judaism" as the cause of the conflict. Hyndman charged "Beit, Barnato and their fellow-Jews" as aiming to create "an Anglo-Hebraic Empire in Africa stretching from Egypt to Cape Colony".

Hyndman believed Jews were central to "a sinister 'gold international' opposed to the 'red international' of socialism". Hyndman supported the antisemitic Viennese riots of 1885, arguing that they represented a blow against Jewish finance capital. Hyndman repeatedly denounced what he saw as the overwhelming power of "capitalist Jews on the London Press", believing that the "Semitic lords of the press" had created war in South Africa. Hyndman remained committed to conspiracies concerning Jews, remarking that "unless you said that they [Jews] were the most capable and brilliant people of the earth, you had the whole of their international agencies against you".

Such antisemitism disillusioned erstwhile supporters. Eleanor Marx wrote privately to Wilhelm Liebknecht that "Mr Hyndman whenever he could do with impunity has endeavoured to set English workmen against foreigners". Hyndman had previously attacked Eleanor Marx in antisemitic terms, noting that she had "inherited in her nose and mouth the Jewish type from Marx himself".

=== After the war ===
Hyndman upset members of the BSP by supporting the United Kingdom's involvement in World War I. The party split in two, with Hyndman forming a new National Socialist Party. Hyndman remained leader of the small party until his death from pneumonia at his home in Well Walk, Hampstead, on 22 November 1921.

== Bibliography ==
- A Commune for London (1888)
- England For All (1881)
- The Bankruptcy of India
- Commercial Crisis of the Nineteenth Century (1892)
- Economics of Socialism (1890)
- The Record of an Adventurous Life
- The Future of Democracy (1915)
- The Awakening of Asia (1919)
- The Evolution of Revolution (1921)

== See also ==
- History of the socialist movement in the United Kingdom

Media offices
Preceded by C. L. Fitzgerald	Editor of Justice; 1884–1886	Succeeded by Harry Quelch
Preceded by Harry Quelch	Editor of Justice; 1889–1891	Succeeded by Harry Quelch
Party political offices
Preceded by E. H. Jarvis	President of the Social Democratic Party; 1910	Succeeded by Arthur Charles Bannington
Preceded by New position	President of the British Socialist Party; 1911–1915	Succeeded by Dan Irving
