= Social Democratic Federation =

- Leader: Henry Hyndman
- Founded: 7 June 1881
- Dissolved: 1 October 1911
- Preceded by: Manhood Suffrage League
- Succeeded by: British Socialist Party; Socialist Party of Great Britain
- Headquarters: London
- Newspaper: Justice
- Ideology: Socialism; Marxism; Lassallism (After 1880s)
- Political position: Left-wing

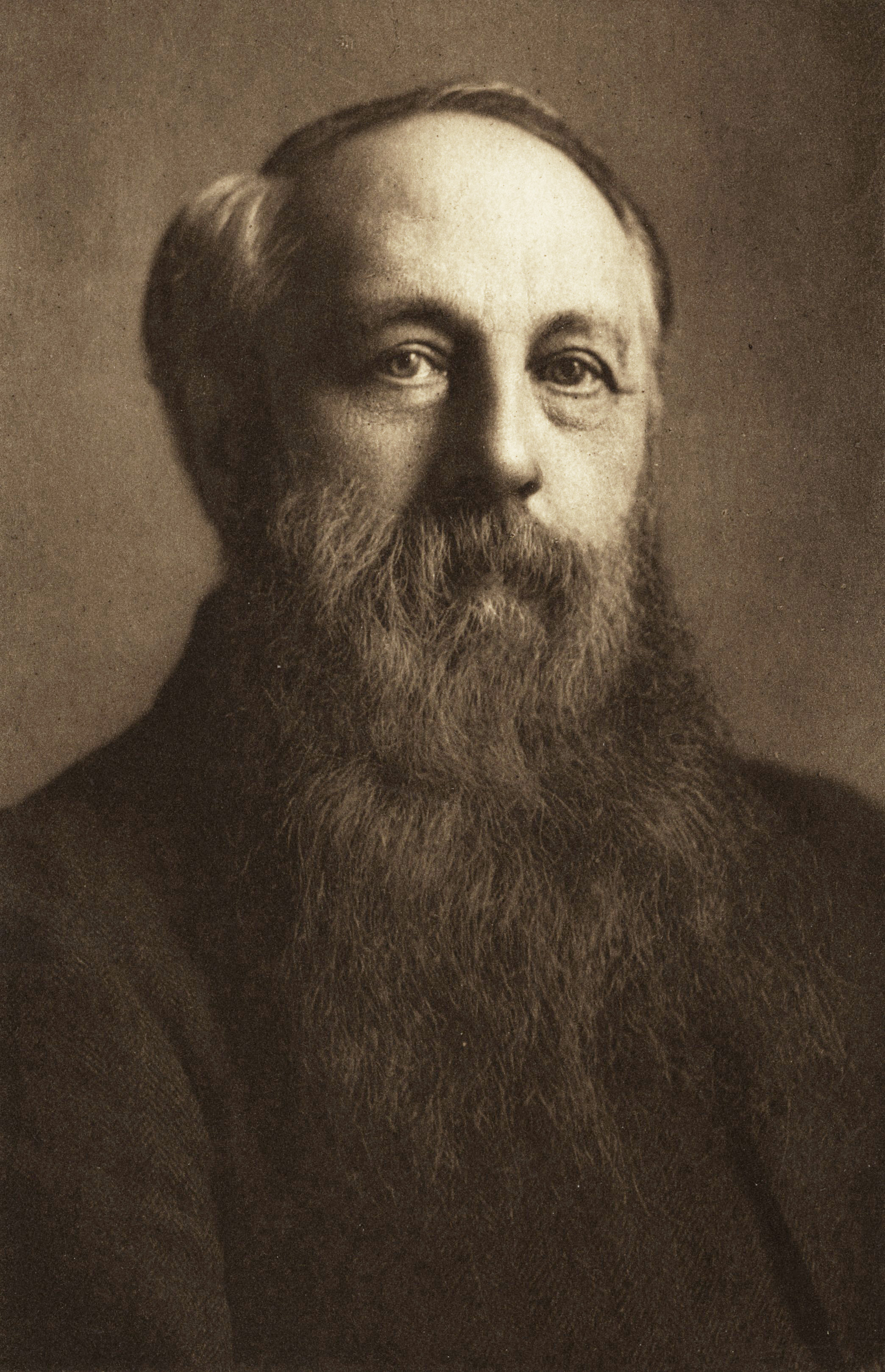
SDF founder Henry Hyndman

The Social Democratic Federation (SDF) was a British socialist political party. The first socialist party in Britain, it was founded by H. M. Hyndman in 1881. Its members included William Morris, George Lansbury, James Connolly and Eleanor Marx. Many of its early leading members had previously been active in the Manhood Suffrage League.

The SDF battled through defections of its right and left wings to other organisations in the first decade of the twentieth century before uniting with other radical groups in the Marxist British Socialist Party from 1911 until 1920.

== Organizational history ==
=== Origins and early years ===
The British Marxist movement effectively began in 1880 when a businessman named Henry M. Hyndman read Karl Marx's Communist Manifesto in French translation while crossing to America. Upon his return to London, Hyndman sought out Marx, then an exile living not far from his home. Hyndman, who had run for parliament earlier that year, decided to start a new political organization which he called the Democratic Federation and in June called its foundation convention, consisting of an assortment of radical grouplets and individuals.

In preparation for the convention, Hyndman circulated among the delegates his book England for All, which paraphrased Marx's Capital without crediting the original author. Marx took great offence and broke off personal relations with his English epigone. Marx's distaste for Hyndman was shared by Friedrich Engels, who succeeded his close friend as his literary executor at Marx's death on 14 March 1883.

In 1884 the Democratic Federation was transformed into the Social Democratic Federation (SDF) when the group adopted an explicitly socialist platform. The Federation was strongly opposed to the Liberal Party which then claimed to represent the labour movement in parliament. The programme of the SDF was strongly progressive, calling for (amongst other measures) a 48-hour workweek, the abolition of child labour, compulsory and free and secular education, equality for women, and the nationalisation of the means of production, distribution, and exchange by a democratic state.

The party attracted to its banner a number of Britain's leading radicals, including William Morris, Edward Aveling and his partner Eleanor Marx, Karl's youngest daughter.

Henry Hyndman dominated the SDF from the beginning. One key to his personal authority lay in his purse, which paid the bulk of its administrative expenses, and its weekly newspaper, Justice, lost money despite a healthy circulation of about 3,500. Some in the Federation were unhappy, regarding Hyndman as domineering in personal relations and sectarian in political thinking. Hyndman's detractors considered him politically ambitious and lacking in principle, and their ill will and personal antipathy came to a climax at Christmas 1884.

=== The split of 1884 ===
On 23 December 1884, a meeting of the Executive Council of the SDF was held at which Hyndman was attacked for several alleged offences: defaming a comrade in Edinburgh by calling him an "anarchist" without cause, corresponding in the name of the organisation without authority and in defiance of the Council's decisions, and withholding correspondence meant for the organisation as a whole. Hyndman was additionally accused of stirring up strife between members of the Council and fabricating a provincial branch from thin air so as to ready himself to wield undeserved voting authority at a future convention of the organisation.

Hyndman gathered his factional supporters for his defence, while his opponents, who included William Morris, Belfort Bax, Eleanor Marx, and Edward Aveling, mustered their own forces. After protracted debate, on 27 December a motion of censure on Hyndman was adopted, after which the majority of the Council, freshly victorious, promptly resigned from the SDF.

The individuals leaving the party formed a new organisation called the Socialist League, supported financially by William Morris, who particularly objected to Hyndman's rigid control of the party press and what he considered his excessive personal influence. They considered Hyndman opportunistic and obsessed with parliamentary politics to the detriment of trade union organisation. Hyndman retained the party publications Justice and To-Day and the 500 or so members of the SDF chose sides as one small organisation became two smaller ones. Friedrich Engels was jubilant about the split, declaring to Eduard Bernstein: "I have the satisfaction of having seen through the whole racket from the outset, correctly sized up all the people concerned, and foretold what the end would be."

Unfortunately for Engels' best laid plans, it was the Socialist League that wound up "shipwrecked" by the split, while the SDF emerged from the factional strife with Hyndman and his followers in tighter control than before.

=== The SDF in the 1880s ===
The defection of assorted and sundry anti-parliamentary members from the Social Democratic Federation, including a fair number of anarchists, to form the Socialist League in 1885 left the SDF a relatively more homogeneous unit than its new offshoot. While Hyndman and the SDF used scare tactics about some impending national catastrophe that would prove the catalyst for socialist revolution in the mid-1880s, his eyes remained on the parliamentary prize. In the general election of 1885 the SDF stood three candidates for office—subsidised by a £340 campaign contribution obtained by SDF leader Henry Hyde Champion from a Conservative Party agent named Maltman Barry. Despite this somewhat shady attempt of the Tories to split the opposition, the SDF fared extremely poorly, with John Burns receiving 598 votes in Nottingham while Jack Williams in Hampstead and John Fielding in Kensington netted a mere 27 and 32 votes, respectively. The SDF's foray into electoral politics had proven to be both controversial and wholly ineffective. It led to another split in the SDF when a group around C. L. Fitzgerald formed the Socialist Union.

In the winter of 1885/86 the SDF made its first appreciable advance in the public eye. With economic depression sweeping the country, a demonstration was planned to be held in Trafalgar Square in February 1886 to agitate against free trade and in favour of protectionist trade policies, a move which many believed would lessen the unemployment problem in Great Britain. The SDF agitated for the "Right to Work" and made demands for the establishment of state-directed co-operative colonies on underutilised lands. The police forced the SDF-led demonstration out of the Square. John Burns led the protesters down Pall Mall en route to Hyde Park bearing a red flag. Along the way the marchers scuffled with jeering onlookers and a riot ensued, with smashed windows and fisticuffs. The party claimed a big boost in membership in the aftermath, with its official organ, Justice, selling 4,000 copies of each issue.

The next autumn a protest of socialists and radicals was called for Trafalgar Square for 13 November 1887. This time, still smarting from the riot of the previous January, political and police officials had committed a massive body of personnel to the Square, including some 4,000 constables, 300 mounted policemen, 300 soldiers from the Grenadier Guards, and 350 members of the Life Guards. This body of police and military forces used horses, batons, and rifle butts against an estimated 20,000 demonstrators out of the square, injuring hundreds and killing two in the process. Some 200 demonstrators were taken to the hospital, 150 of whom needed surgical treatment. Three hundred demonstrators were arrested and 112 police officers injured. This demonstration and its forcible suppression became known as "Bloody Sunday" to a generation.

The next week, 20 November 1887 the popular mood of protest continued to expand. Some 40,000 demonstrators turned out at Hyde Park to voice their outrage over the "Bloody Sunday" killings, while an additional large crowd gathered in Trafalgar Square. For a second straight week, mounted police charged the crowd, supported by volunteer "special constables. One demonstrator, Alfred Linnell, was crushed by the horses and died of his injuries 12 days later. A massive demonstration of 120,000 Londoners turned out for his funeral."

In the aftermath of these protests, the SDF assumed a place in the public imagination far beyond the role which the organisation's actual size and efficacy would ordinarily have merited. For some in the party itself, however, the futility of mass action to achieve positive results seemed clear. A renewed effort for working-class representation in parliament began to show itself. This trend was led by Keir Hardie, a Scot adhering to the intellectual tradition of ethical socialism rather than Marxism. Together with labour leaders Tom Mann, John Burns, and socialist activist Henry Hyde Champion, the movement to launch a Labour Party established outside of the existing two parties was begun in earnest.

When these ideas were rejected by the SDF at its 1888 Annual Conference in favour of a limitation of party support to candidates endorsing the notion of class war, these advocates of an ameliorative Labour Party set out on their own, abandoning the SDF to its own fate.

=== The SDF shatters ===
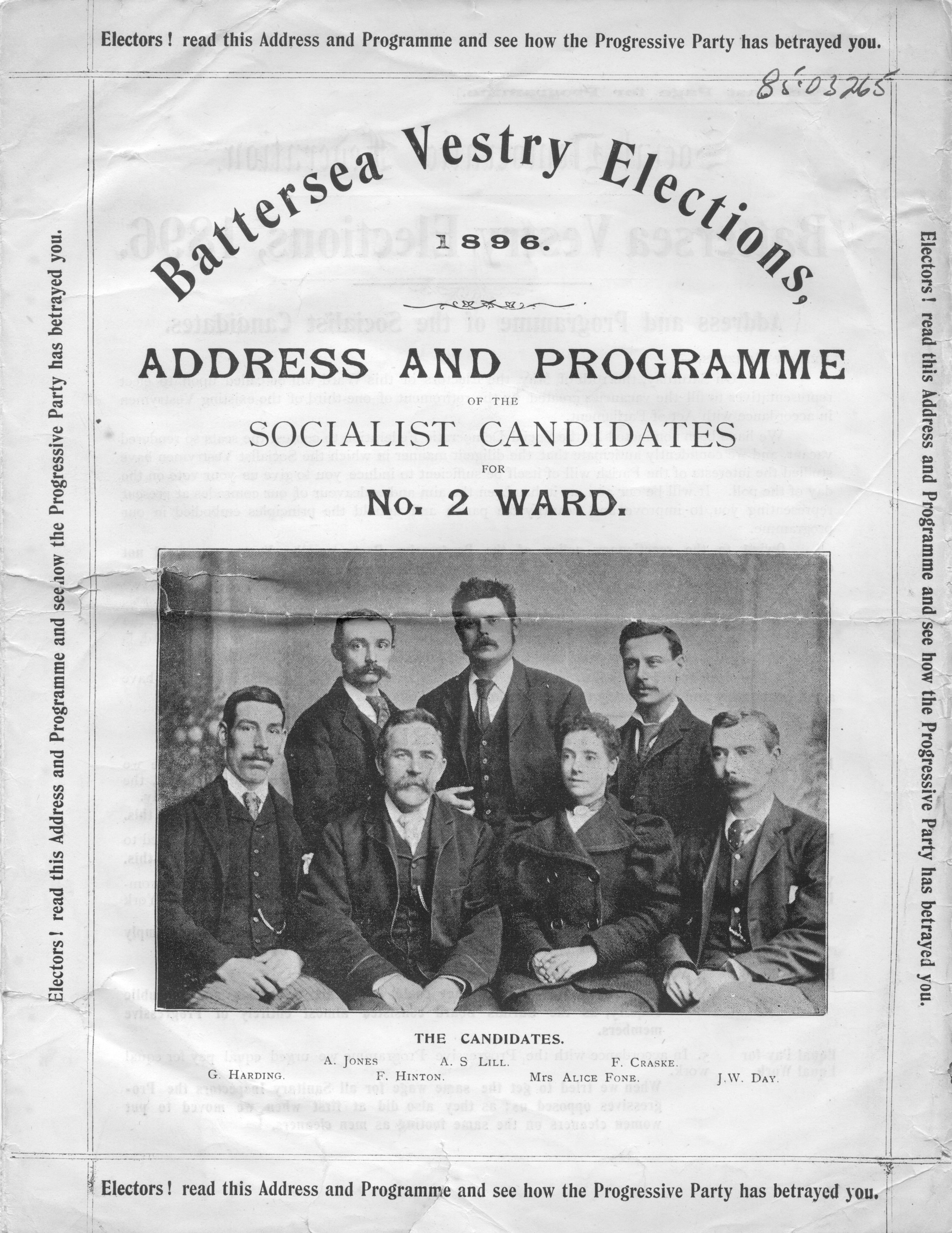
SDF election leaflet, 1896

Many trade unionists who were members of the SDF felt that the Federation neglected trade union activities. This group believed that the SDF was obsessed with parliamentarian pursuits and should be instead more active in the industrial struggle. Hyndman disagreed, seeking a continued concentration on political activities. Hyndman's control of the party organisation and press proved pivotal and the SDF refused to change its politically-dominated strategy, causing Burns and Mann to leave the party in 1890.

At the turn of the century, the SDF optimistically claimed to have 96 branches with about 9,000 members. Many of these branches failed to pay their subscription to the organization, however, with the dues of a penny per member per month paid to the central office irregularly. One historian has estimated the actual strength of the organization in 1900 at approximately 50 functioning branches with an active membership of around 1,000.

Despite the weakness of its adult organisation, the SDF was instrumental in the development of the movement of Socialist Sunday Schools for children, institutions which taught socialist ideas and ethical principles to youngsters in competition with various denominations' Sunday schools.

During this interval the SDF experienced the atrophy of its ultra-parliamentary right wing to the Independent Labour Party (ILP). This party, led by Keir Hardie, was a big tent party of the left, more heavily influenced by Christian Socialism than by the atheistic Marxism of the SDF. The ILP also had the advantage of having Hardie as a member of the House of Commons after winning the West Ham South seat in the 1892 General Election. This enabled the ILP to argue that it was a more effective vehicle for change than the SDF. Prominent figures such as Henry Hyde Champion, Ben Tillett, Jim Connell and George Lansbury, all left the SDF for the ILP.

Initially, there was progress towards a unification of the SDF with its rivals of the parliamentarian left. On 27 February 1900 Hyndman and the SDF met with the ILP, the Fabian Society and trade union leaders at the Memorial Hall in Farringdon Street, London. After a debate the 129 delegates decided to pass Hardie's motion to establish "a distinct Labour group in Parliament, who shall have their own whips, and agree upon their policy, which must embrace a readiness to cooperate with any party which for the time being may be engaged in promoting legislation in the direct interests of labour."

To make this possible the Conference established a Labour Representation Committee (LRC). This committee included two members from the Social Democratic Federation and the Independent Labour Party, one member of the Fabian Society, and seven trade unionists. The LRC eventually evolved into the Labour Party. Despite the formal unification of forces, many members of the party were uncomfortable with the Marxism of the SDF and Hyndman had very little influence over the development of this political group, eventually leaving the alliance in 1907.

In addition to the loss of the party's right wing, the SDF experienced defections of some of its most radical members for different reasons. Hyndman's personalistic leadership and the policies of the organisation generated proved to be an ongoing inspiration for a river of internal criticism. One major source of contention surrounded the attitude of Hyndman and other party leaders towards the Boer War of 1899–1902. While the party adopted an anti-war stance, the rhetoric of the leadership seemed to these members to be far removed from a principled socialist opposition to the conflict, with Hyndman going so far as to declare in July 1901 that further anti-war agitation was "a waste of time and money." Charges of reformism and chauvinism were made by left wing members, who began publishing their oppositional criticism in the official organ of the Socialist Labor Party of America.

At the March 1902 annual conference of the SDF, held in Blackburn, the battle between the insurgent left wing and Hyndman's leadership group came to a head. A motion by the left wing to oppose continued unity negotiations with the ILP was roundly defeated, as were other motions to advance an explicitly radical programme, such as one proposal calling for establishment of socialist dual unions and another which would have banned SDF members from joining other political organisations. At the conclusion of the conference SDF editor Harry Quelch commented upon the acrimony which had ensued from the programmatic efforts of the left wing, threatening that the dissidents "must either fall into line or fall out altogether."

The 1903 annual conference, held 10–12 April at Shoreditch Town Hall, marked the final showdown. Before the proceedings began, George Yates was informed that he was to be expelled from the party for purportedly obstructing left unity, failing to sell Justice, and writing an editorial for The Socialist in which he declared that there was a "distinct tendency" of the SDF to alter their former revolutionary attitude in favour of "opportunist tactics of the worst kind." Delegates agreed to Yates' expulsion by a vote of 56 to 6, with the resolution further empowering the executive to expel, without the right of appeal, anybody endorsing Yates' views.

Those members of the left wing located in Scotland, who controlled the SDF apparatus there, could see little sense in remaining in the SDF further and they shortly left en bloc to launch the Socialist Labour Party, inaugurated at a conference held 7 June 1903. Others, tending to be based in London, left to form the Socialist Party of Great Britain in 1904. The departing left wing particularly faulted the SDF's perceived failure to concentrate on work to radicalise the nation's trade unions, which was envisioned as being the key to the revolutionary transformation of society.

=== New traction for an old party ===
While the SDF stagnated and split during the first decade of the 20th century, the various failures of those who departed paved the way for new growth. Unhappiness with the Labour Party's performance in parliament, hampered as it was by electoral alliance with the Liberal Party, led to renewed calls for a reorganisation of socialist forces. In 1910, Victor Grayson named Hyndman, Robert Blatchford, and Keir Hardie as the political leaders most capable of forging a new alliance.

In 1911 this idea came to realisation when a Socialist Unity Conference was held, bringing together representatives of the SDF, the left wing of the ILP, the network of clubs associated with The Clarion newspaper, and various local socialist societies. Together these groups formed a new organisation, the British Socialist Party. While the group initially had 35,000 members across 376 branches, the SDF's leadership did not fully commit to the organisation.

=== Social Democratic Federation reprised (1919–1939) ===
Hyndman was a initially a leading figure in the early British Socialist Party, but a growing split over which position to take in the First World War saw him leave to form in 1916 the rival National Socialist Party (NSP). After 1919, the NSP would take the name of the old Social Democratic Federation. The group enjoyed some short-term success but gradually faded into the Labour Party, being wound up in 1939.

== Conferences of the SDF ==
Year	Description	City	Dates	Chair	Delegates	Proceedings
1881	Annual Conference	London	8 June	H. M. Hyndman	N/A	
1882	Annual Conference	London	31 May	H. M. Hyndman	150	
1883	Annual Conference	London	16? May	H. M. Hyndman		
1884	Annual Conference	London	4 August	H. M. Hyndman		
1885	Annual Conference	London	3 August			
1886	Annual Conference	London	2 August	James F. Murray		
1887	Annual Conference	Manchester	1 August			
1888	Annual Conference	London	6 August		26	
1889	Annual Conference	Birmingham	10 August		20	
1890	Annual Conference	London	4 August		26	
1891	Annual Conference	Sheffield	3 August		23	
1892	Annual Conference	London	1 August	Herbert Burrows	33	
1893	Annual Conference	Burnley	6–7 August			
1894	Annual Conference	London	5–6 August	H. M. Hyndman		
1895	Annual Conference	Birmingham	4–5 August	Joseph Chatterton		
1896	Annual Conference	London	2–3 August	George Lansbury	82	
1897	17th Annual Conference	Northampton	1–2 August	Frederick George Jones	55	Report.
1898	18th Annual Conference	Edinburgh	31 July-1 August	John Leslie	54	
1899	19th Annual Conference	Manchester	6–7 August	T. M. Purvis		
1900	20th Annual Conference	London	5–6 August	Will Thorne	60	Report.
1901	21st Annual Conference	Birmingham	4–5 August	Dan Irving	59	
1902	22nd Annual Conference	Blackburn	28–30 March	F. J. Jones	72	
1903	23rd Annual Conference	London	11–12 April	Joseph Frederick Green	62	Report.
1904	24th Annual Conference	Burnley	1–3 April	Peter Walker	68	Report.
1905	25th Annual Conference	Northampton	21–23 April	James Gribble	56	Report.
1906	26th Annual Conference	Bradford	13–15 April	Edward Hartley	83	
1907	27th Annual Conference	Carlisle	29–31 March	Ernest Lowthian	140	
1908	29th Annual Conference	Manchester	17–19 August	John Moore	149	Report.
1909	30th Annual Conference	Bristol	9–11 April	Harry Jarvis	144	
1910	31st Annual Conference	London	25–27 March	H. M. Hyndman	200	
1911	32nd Annual Conference	Coventry	14–16 April	Arthur Charles Bannington	70	

Data from Kendall, The Revolutionary Movement in Britain, pp. 310–311; supplemented by published report titles, per WorldCat.

== National election results ==
Election	Seats won	±	Total votes	%	Position	Leader
1885	0 / 670	▲	657 (#8)	0.0%	No Seats	Henry Hyndman
1892	0 / 670	▲	659 (#7)	0.0%	No Seats	Henry Hyndman
1895	0 / 670	▲	3,122 (#6)	0.1%	No Seats	Henry Hyndman
1906	0 / 670	▲	18,446 (#5)	0.4%	No Seats	Henry Hyndman
1910	0 / 670	▼	13,479 (#6)	0.2%	No Seats	Henry Hyndman
1910	0 / 670	▼	5,733 (#6)	0.1%	No Seats	Henry Hyndman

== Notable members ==
- Guy Aldred
- Edward Aveling
- Ambrose Barker
- John Barlas
- E. Belfort Bax
- Tom Bell
- Hubert Bland
- John Burns
- Herbert Burrows
- Edward Carpenter
- Henry Hyde Champion
- Jim Connell
- James Connolly
- Walter Crane
- Jack Fitzgerald
- John Bruce Glasier
- Mary Gray
- Clara Hendin
- Amie Hicks
- Margaretta Hicks
- Mabel Hope
- H.M. Hyndman
- Albert Inkpin
- Dan Irving
- T.A. "Tommy" Jackson
- Rose Jarvis
- Jack Jones
- James Leigh Joynes
- Zelda Kahan
- Tom Kennedy
- Jack Kent
- Fred Knee
- George Lansbury
- Henry W. Lee
- Con Lehane
- Tommy Lewis
- James MacDonald
- Ramsay MacDonald
- Valentine McEntee
- John Maclean
- Sam Mainwaring
- Tom Mann
- Eleanor Marx
- Dora Montefiore
- William Morris
- Hans Neumann
- Harry Orbell
- Harry Quelch
- Lorenzo Quelch
- Archibald Robertson
- Will Thorne
- Ben Tillett
- Robert Tressell

== See also ==
- Social Democratic Federation election results
- Justice, official organ of the SDF
