= Executive Committee of the Communist Party of Great Britain =

The Executive Committee of the Communist Party of Great Britain (EC of the CPGB) was the governing body of the Communist Party of Great Britain between 1920 and 1991. It governed the party between congresses, at which successive ECs were appointed/elected. The EC played an important leadership role, according to the principles of democratic centralism to which the CPGB adhered.

== Provisional Committee for the Communist Party ==
The Provisional Executive Committee of the Communist Party of Great Britain was based at 21a Maiden Lane, Strand, London, W.C.2.

- CUG: Communist Unity Group, a group set up within the Socialist Labour Party (SLP) which favoured joining a newly formed Communist Party.
- BSP: British Socialist Party
- SWSS: South Wales Socialist Society, of which the South Wales Communist Council was the pro-unity faction
- WSF: Workers Socialist Federation
- PRP: Prohibition and Reform Party

In June 1919, the first of a series of meeting to discuss founding a Communist Party for Great Britain took place. Eventually the following proposal was formulated:

“That the membership of the various organisations be consulted as to their willingness to merge the existing organisations in a united party, having for its object the establishment of Communism by means of the dictatorship of the working class working through Soviets; and that the question of the affiliation of the new Party to the Labour Party be settled by a referendum of the members three months after the party is formed.”

Whereas the BSF were firmly behind affiliation to the Labour Party, the WSF rejected such a proposal, along with sections of the SWSS and the SLP. However, sections within the SWSS formed the South Wales Communist Council in favour proposal, just as the Communist Unity Group was formed within the SLP, only to be expelled by the SLP executive committee.

The provisional committee then proceeded to organise a National Convention, at which the proposal was to be turned into a resolution, which if carried would transform the convention into the Founding Congress of the Communist Party. Those groups attending the convention were obliged to pledge to pass the resolution and transform all the branches, groups, and societies sending delegates to the convention would be transformed into branches of the new party, bound by the decisions of the convention. This was in line with Lenin's democratic centralism and was rejected by the WSF.

The Foundation Congress took place at Cannon Street Hotel, London and the International Socialist Club, London, 31 July – 1 August.

| Name | Role | Location | Political organisation | Ethnicity | Social class |
|---|---|---|---|---|---|
| Tom Bell | | London | (CUG, SLP) | Scottish | Working Class |
| George Deer (BSP) | South Wales Communist Council | Lincoln | (BSP) | English | Working Class |
| Will Hewlett | | Abertillery | (SWCC) | Welsh | Working Class |
| Fred Hodgson | | Reading | (BSP) | English | Working Class |
| Albert Inkpin | Secretary | London | (BSP) | English | Working Class |
| Arthur MacManus | Chairman | London | (CUG, SLP) | Scottish | Working Class |
| Cecil Malone | | London | (BSP) | English | Minor aristocracy |
| Dora Montefiore | | Crowborough | (BSP) | English | Middle class |
| William Paul | | Derby | (CUG, SLP) | Scottish | Working class |
| Fred Shaw | | Huddersfield | (BSP) | English | Working class |
| Bob Stewart | | Dundee | (PRP, CUG) | English | Working class |
| Alf Watts | Treasurer | London | (BSP) | English | Working class |
| Fred Willis | | London | (BSP) | English | Working class |

== First EC of the CPGB ==
Foundation Congress, 31 July – 1 August 1920

- Tom Bell (CUG, SLP)
- George Deer (BSP)
- Will Hewlett (South Wales Communist Council)
- Fred Hodgson (BSP)
- Albert Inkpin (BSP)
- Arthur MacManus (CUG, SLP)
- Cecil Malone (BSP)
- William Mellor (Guild Communists)
- Dora Montefiore (BSP)
- William Paul (CUG, SLP)
- Fred Shaw (BSP)
- Bob Stewart (Socialist Prohibition and Reform Party, CUG)
- Alf Watts (BSP)
- Fred Willis (BSP)
