= Council of Workers' and Soldiers' Delegates =

Organisation set up to co-ordinate the socialisation of the British economy

The Council of Workers' and Soldiers' Delegates was established on 3 June 1917 at the Leeds Convention held in Leeds, England. The founding conference was attended by 1,150 delegates. It was inspired by the events of the Russian February Revolution.

When news of the February Revolution (8–12 March 1917) in Russia spread to the British Isles, it inspired the labour movement to celebrate the event. The first event was a meeting organised in the Royal Albert Hall, London, on 31 March. This was attended by 10,000 people with a further 5,000 outside, for whom there was no space.

The Leeds Convention established the organisation, which had the support of both the Independent Labour Party and the British Socialist Party. However, a few months later, the Bolshevik October Revolution took place; the participants had different attitudes towards it, and the council collapsed.

== The Leeds Convention ==
The Leeds Convention, originally to be held at the Albert Hall, Leeds but then moved to the Coliseum Theatre, was held on Sunday 3 June 1917. It was organised by the United Socialist Council, a body which contained representatives of the British Socialist Party (BSP), the Independent Labour Party (ILP) and the Fabian Society, and was attended by 1,150 delegates from various political organisations, trades unions and pressure groups. The event was claimed to be a "Democratic Conference to establish Democracy in Great Britain" and "To Follow Russia" and four resolutions were passed - 1. hailing the Russian Revolution; 2. on foreign policy and war aims, calling for a negotiated end to the war; 3. on civil liberties, including calls for equal political rights, freedom of speech, and release of political and religious prisoners (including conscientious objectors); 4. to form Workmen's and Soldiers' Councils in Britain "for initiating and co-ordinating working-class activity". It heard messages of support from George Lansbury, Clifford Allen and the Executive of the Soldiers’ and Workmen’s Deputies in Petrograd.

=== Speakers ===
The convention was addressed by:

- Ramsay MacDonald, MP, Chairman of the Parliamentary Labour Party
- Robert Smillie, President of the Scottish Miners' Federation
- Dora Montefiore, British Socialist Party
- Philip Snowden, MP,
- Edwin C. Fairchild
- William O'Brien
- Charles Roden Buxton
- Edward Tupper, National Sailors' and Firemen's Union
- Ernest Bevin
- Tom Mann
- Charles Ammon
- Charlotte Despard
- Frederick Pethwick Lawrence
- Bertrand Russell
- William Crawford Anderson MP
- Robert Williams
- Ethel Snowden
- Sylvia Pankhurst
- Fred Shaw
- Richard Wallhead
- J. Sanders
- Nellie Cressall
- Joseph Toole
- Willie Gallacher
- Noah Ablett

The organising committee was made up of Henry Alexander (B.S.P.), Charles Ammon, William Crawford Anderson, M.P., Charlotte Despard, Edwin C. Fairchild, Joseph Fineberg, Fred Jowett, M.P., George Lansbury, Ramsay MacDonald, MP., Tom Quelch, Robert Smillie, Philip Snowden, MP., and Robert Williams. The Joint Secretaries of the Convention were Albert Inkpin (B.S.P.) and Francis Johnson (I.L.P.). Others in attendance at the Leeds Convention included Ben Tillett, Fred Jowett, Arthur MacManus, J. T. Murphy, Margaret Bondfield and Alf Mattison.

== See also ==
- Labour Parliament (1854)
