= Edwin C. Fairchild =

Socialist activist

Edwin Charles Fairchild (1874–1955) was a socialist activist and conscientious objector during the First World War.

== Biography ==
A long-term member of the Social Democratic Federation (SDF), Fairchild was a member of its radical Central Hackney branch, alongside Zelda Kahan and Theodore Rothstein. As early as 1909, he was a signatory to a resolution denouncing party leader H. M. Hyndman's anti-German rhetoric. He supported closer links with the Independent Labour Party and other socialists, and worked with Alf Purcell and Victor Grayson on the Provisional Committee for the Promotion of Common Ground Among the Socialists. This was opposed by the right wing of the SDF, but proved successful, as it constituted the British Socialist Party (BSP), and the SDF merged itself into the new party.

Fairchild was elected to the BSP's first standing orders committee, alongside Duncan Carmichael, Peter Petroff and C. T. Douthwaite. The four worked together to ensure voices in the party opposing British rearmament were heard. He was also elected to the party's executive, representing the party's left-wing.

At the 1913 London County Council election, Fairchild stood for the BSP in Bow and Bromley. He took 1,609 votes, but was not elected. In 1915, the party selected him as its delegate to the Zimmerwald Conference, but he was refused a passport and could not attend. During this period, Fairchild was close to John Maclean. When Maclean's newspaper, Vanguard, was suppressed, Fairchild launched The Call as a replacement.

The BSP was divided over British entry to World War I; although the majority of the party opposed it, much of the leadership was in favour. Fairchild was an opponent of the war, although he was considered a centrist within the party, as he also argued against action which would endanger "national defence". The party's right-wing were defeated at its conference in 1916 and walked out; following this, Fairchild was elected as the party's chairman, and The Call became the party's official newspaper. The BSP affiliated to the Labour Party, and Fairchild was selected by the Rochdale Trades and Labour Council as the party's candidate for Rochdale the 1918 UK general election. However, a dispute over his support for conscientious objection during World War I led to his replacement by R. H. Tawney.

Like the majority of his party, Fairchild welcomed the February Revolution in Russia, and he spoke at the launch of the Council of Workers' and Soldiers' Delegates in Leeds. However, he remained committed to parliamentary democracy even when many in his party preferred setting up workers' councils. He and Henry Alexander resigned from the BSP in 1919, after it voted to seek affiliation to the Third International.

Media offices
Preceded by New position	Editor of The Call; 1916 – 1919	Succeeded by Fred Willis
