= Leeds Convention =

1917 socialist meeting

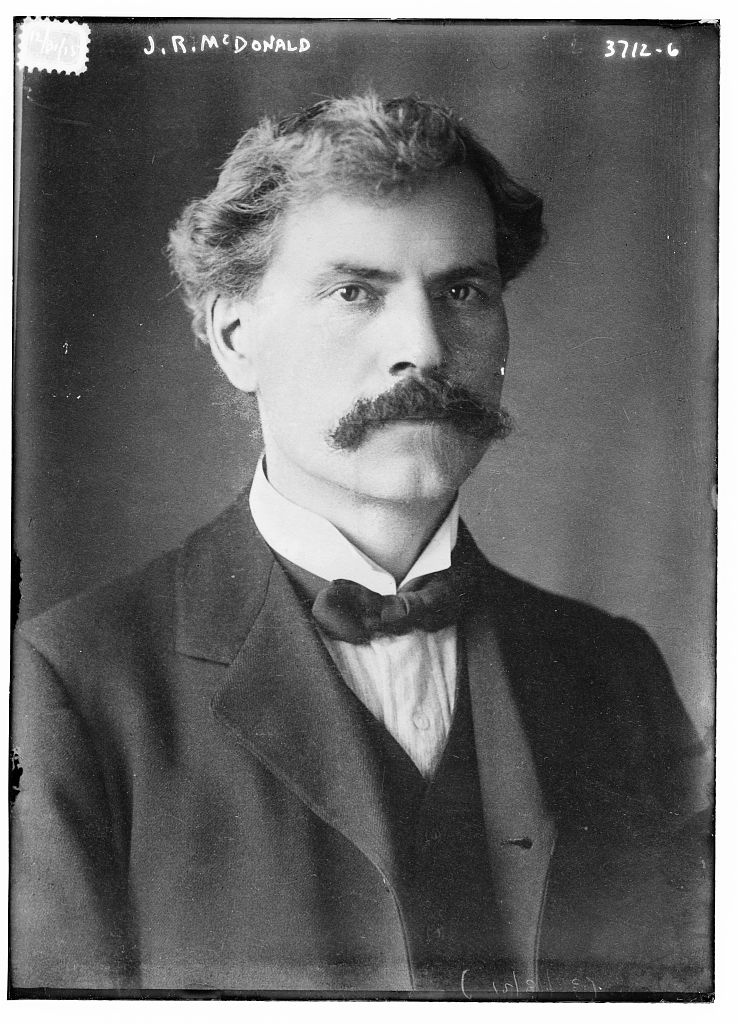
Member of the organising committee and speaker at the conference James Ramsay MacDonald, pictured in 1916

The Leeds Convention was a socialist meeting in Leeds, England, held on 3 June 1917. It was organised by the British Socialist Party and Independent Labour Party in the wake of the February Revolution, which had seen the abdication of Nicholas II of Russia. The Labour Party organisers hoped it would instigate a shift within the party towards support of a peace treaty to end the First World War. Many leading British socialist figures spoke at the convention and it supported, almost unanimously, the four resolutions proposed. These were to support the Russian Revolution, to support a peace treaty, to support civil liberties and to establish a network of councils of workers' and soldiers' delegates.

The convention was criticised in the right-wing press and raised the concerns of British king George V but ultimately led to little progress. The Labour Party came to dominate the movement and, with prominent member Philip Snowden declaring "I am for Socialism coming through parliament and no other way", almost none of the workers' and soldiers' councils were established. The international Third Zimmerwald Conference came to be seen as the more prominent organisation calling for a "people's peace". Although characterised as a revolutionary body one historian, Stephen White writing in 1974, states that the convention was predominantly a pacifist meeting. Many of its attendees went on to found the Communist Party of Great Britain in 1920

== Background and planning ==
Britain had been engaged in the First World War, as an ally of Russia and France, fighting against the Central Powers since Summer 1914. The February Revolution in Russia in March 1917, which forced the abdication of Nicholas II, led to rallies in solidarity in Britain and a rising militant sentiment in socialist circles. The British Socialist Party and Independent Labour Party, which had come together under the United Socialist Council, called for a national conference to be held at Leeds, Yorkshire, on 3 June.

An organising committee was established that included many leading British left-wing figures including Labour Party members Ramsay MacDonald MP, Philip Snowden and George Lansbury (who sought to use the event to adopt a pro-peace policy for the party) and trade unionists Robert Williams and Robert Smillie. Notices of the meeting were distributed, stating that "the plans of the imperialists, militarists, and aggressionists throughout Europe can only be thwarted by concerted action on the part of the working class, now rapidly returning to their adherence to the principles of the International Solidarity of Labour".

In May the organising committee published the four resolutions to be voted on at the convention: to hail the success of the Russian Revolution, to call for an end to the war, to support civil liberties and, for the first time in Britain, to establish "in every town, urban, and rural district" councils of workmen and soldiers' delegates, under an overarching Council of Workers' and Soldiers' Delegates. The last resolution was inspired by the success of the soldiers' and workers' soviets in Russia. The British authorities were worried by the convention and the British cabinet considered banning it under the Defence of the Realm Act and the convention was criticised in the right-wing press.

== Convention ==
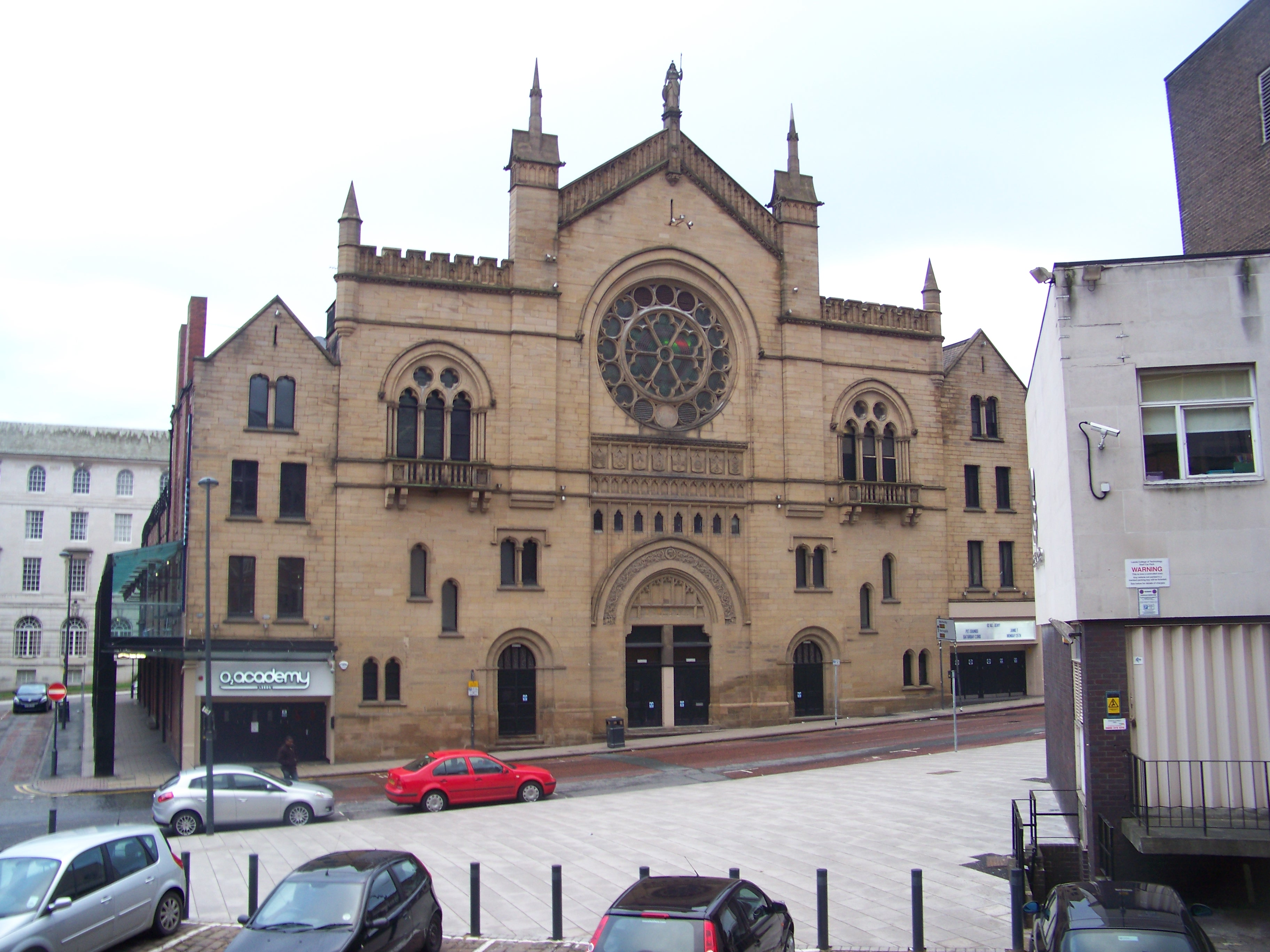
The Coliseum, now the O2 Academy Leeds, pictured in 2010

The convention assembled at the Leeds Coliseum on 3 June 1917. It was attended by 3,500 people which socialist writer Ralph Miliband described as "perhaps the most remarkable gathering of the period".

A telegram message of greeting from the Petrograd Soviet was read after which voting proceeded on the four resolutions, all of which were passed almost unanimously. Speakers at the convention included MacDonald, Snowden, Bertrand Russell, Sylvia Pankhurst, Tom Mann, Charlotte Despard, Ernest Bevin, Dora Montefiore and Willie Gallacher.

The convention congratulated the people of Russia on the revolution which "has overthrown a tyranny that resisted the intellectual and social development of Russia, which has removed the standing menace to aggressive imperialism in Eastern Europe, and which has liberated the people of Russia for the great work of establishing political and economic freedom on a firm foundation and of taking the foremost part in the international movement for working class emancipation from all forms of political, economic and imperialist oppression and exploitation". A reply to the Petrograd Soviet was agreed, which noted that the Leeds Convention "approved Russia's declaration of foreign policy and war aims, and has pledged itself to work through its newly constituted workmen's and soldiers' council for an immediate democratic peace".

Will Thorne, pictured in 1903

The convention led to concern from the British monarch George V, who asked British Socialist Party Member of Parliament Will Thorne: "Do you think that any ill will come from this Conference at Leeds and the decisions that were made there?". Thorne responded to placate the king, but noted that he "seemed greatly disturbed at the famous Leeds Conference". Yorkshire Evening Post referred to it as a "disloyal convention" and interpreted it as a sign of "developing opposition".

The convention had little practical impact. The movement came under the control of the Labour Party; almost none of the planned workers' and soldiers' councils were established (it is known that one was started in Clydeside). At the time Snowden declared that he preferred to operate through the existing democratic process noting "I do not rule it out of theoretical consideration, that Workers' and Soldiers' Councils or Soviets may come to Britain but I am for Socialism coming through parliament and no other way". British political scientist Stephen White considers that the councils were not established as they were superseded in their primary function, campaigning for a "people's peace" without annexations or indemnities, by the international Third Zimmerwald Conference.

== Legacy ==
Snowden described the convention as "not only the largest Democratic Congress held in Great Britain since the days of the Chartist agitation [but also a] spontaneous expression of the spirit and enthusiasm of the Labour and Democratic movement". Labour Party MP Fred Jowett described it as "the highest point of revolutionary fervour he had seen in this country". Social history writer WA Orton in 1921 described the convention as "the most spectacular piece of utter folly for which [the Socialist left] during the whole war-period, was responsible – which is saying not a little". The convention has generally been characterised as a failed attempt to start a revolution in Britain and an indication that the Labour Party had become over-excited by the events in Russia, but Stephen White, writing in 1974, thought it was more of a pacifist meeting than a revolutionary one. Many of the attendees of the convention would go on to found the Communist Party of Great Britain in 1920.
