= F. H. Gorle =

British activist

Fred H. Gorle (died 7 September 1931) was a British social democratic activist.

Gorle qualified as a solicitor, and worked as a civil servant. He joined the Social Democratic Federation (SDF), and by 1910 was serving as its treasurer.

The SDF became part of the British Socialist Party, and Gorle was elected as a councillor for the party in Watford. He was also prominent in the Labour Church movement, serving a term as president of the Labour Church Union.

in which he was a leading figure in its pro-World War I faction, alongside H. M. Hyndman and Victor Fisher. As a result, he joined the National Socialist Party split, serving on its executive for many years, and often acting as its delegate to the International Socialist Congress. He was also active in the Fabian Society.

In the late 1920s, Gorle moved to Tunbridge Wells, dying there in 1931.

Party political offices
Preceded by J. F. Green	Treasurer of the Social Democratic Party c.1910–1911	Succeeded by Position abolished
