= Duncan Carmichael =

British trade unionist and socialist activist (born 1870)

Duncan Carmichael (1870 – 31 August 1926) was a British trade unionist and socialist activist.

== Biography ==
Living in Battersea, Carmichael joined the Social Democratic Federation (SDF) in 1903, and served on its executive committee from 1909 to 1911. He stood for the group in local elections to the Battersea Metropolitan Borough Council on several occasions. The SDF became the main component of the British Socialist Party (BSP), and Carmichael was elected to its first standing orders committee, alongside C. T. Douthwaite, E. C. Fairchild and Peter Petroff, the four working together to ensure voices within the party which opposed British re-armament were heard.

The BSP affiliated to the Labour Party, and this enabled Carmichael to win a seat in the Winstanley ward, which he held until his death in 1924. He championed the Battersea Right to Work Movement and the Workers' Welfare League for India. While regarding himself as a revolutionary Marxist, proposed only motions which he believed had the support of a large number of local workers.

Carmichael was one of the leading members of the National Union of Shop Assistants, Warehousemen and Clerks in London. Through this, he unionised workers at Smithfield Market and founded the Journeymen Butchers' Federation of Great Britain. He was also one of the main founders of the National Union of Police and Prison Officers.

During World War I, Carmichael sat on the London Food Vigilance Committee, and argued that rationing should be introduced in order to prevent starvation of workers due to food shortages. He was also a leading campaigner against conscription. Following the war, he became the first president of the National Union of Ex-Service Men.

In 1917, Carmichael was elected as the secretary of London Trades Council, and held the post until his death in 1924. In this post, he was known as an ally of the Communist Party of Great Britain, although he does not appear to have joined the party, and by this time was known for his interest in guild socialism.

Trade union offices
Preceded by John Stokes	Secretary of the London Trades Council; 1917–1926	Succeeded by Alfred M. Wall
