= GameCity Prize =

- Awarded for: A game's accomplishments and contribution to popular culture
- Location: United Kingdom
- Presented by: GameCity
- First award: 2011
- Website: http://gamecity.org/prize/

The GameCity Prize is an annual games prize celebrating games as a form of cultural expression. Established in 2011 as part of the annual GameCity festival, the prize seeks "to drive understanding and appreciation of videogames within a wider cultural context".

Nominations are made by a secret Academy of experts, who are asked to select the six games they deem to be the most "interesting and exciting released in the previous twelve months". A jury of non-gamers is then convened to consider the shortlist, first by playing the games and then meeting to select the one game they consider to be "the most interesting, exciting and excellent".

The prize has been described as "gaming's answer to the Bookers", although it has been pointed out that the comparison is flawed in the sense of scope since the GameCity Prize is not specifically designed to reward British games.

== Winners and shortlisted nominees ==
Year	Winner	Shortlisted nominees	Jury	Ref(s)
2014	Papers, Please - Lucas Pope	Animal Crossing: New Leaf – Nintendo; Brothers: A Tale of Two Sons – Starbreeze Studios; Gone Home – The Fullbright Company; Grand Theft Auto V – Rockstar North; Kentucky Route Zero – Cardboard Computer; Papers, Please - Lucas Pope	Darren Aronofsky; Gemma Jackson; Peter Gabriel; Samira Ahmed; Lisa Pollack; Jeremy Farrar	
2013	Spaceteam - Sleeping Beast Games	FIFA 13 – Electronic Arts; FTL: Faster Than Light – Subset Games; The Last of Us – Naughty Dog; Soundshapes – SCEE; Thomas Was Alone – Mike Bithell; XCOM: Enemy Unknown – 2K; Spaceteam - Sleeping Beast Games	Samira Ahmed; Louise Brealey; Tabitha Jackson; Uta Frith; Dinos Chapman; Phil Beadle	
2012	Journey - thatgamecompany	Catherine – Atlus Persona Games; Fez – Polytron; Johann Sebastian Joust – Die Gute Fabrik; Journey – thatgamecompany; Mass Effect 3 – BioWare; Proteus – Ed Key and David Kanaga; Super Mario 3D Land – Nintendo	Lord Puttnam (chair); Charlie Higson; David Gibbons; Lucy Kellaway; Wayne Hemingway; Samira Ahmed; Ekow Eshun; Louise Brealey; Jo Whiley	
2011	Minecraft – Mojang	Ilomilo – Southend Interactive/Microsoft; Superbrothers: Sword & Sworcery EP – Superbrothers/Capybara Games; Pokémon Black – Game Freak/Nintendo; Portal 2 – Valve/EA; Child of Eden – Q? Entertainment/Ubisoft; Limbo – Playdead	Jude Kelly (chair); Charlie Higson; Tom Watson; Nitin Sawhney; James Crabtree; Ed Hall; Frances Barber; You Me At Six; Dave Rowntree	
