= Christopher Thomas Douthwaite =

British socialist politician (1875–1949)

Christopher Thomas Douthwaite (17 November 1875 – 11 February 1949) was a British socialist politician.

Born in Manchester, Douthwaite left school at the age of eleven, working first for a tea merchant, then for the Bradford Dyers Association. He moved to Romiley, then in Cheshire, where he joined the Hatherlow Mutual Improvement Society, then the Independent Labour Party (ILP).

Douthwaite soon became secretary of the ILP's branch in Romiley, and by the late 1900s was active at the national level. He supported Victor Grayson at the 1907 Colne Valley by-election and, like Grayson, launched attacks on the ILP leadership. He proposed that the ILP disaffiliated from the Labour Party, but this motion was heavily defeated at the 1909 ILP Conference; his proposal that the ILP should back independent socialist candidates was defeated much more narrowly. He was elected to the ILP's National Administrative Committee (NAC) in 1910, defeating W. Williams to represent Cheshire and North Wales, then later in the year contributed along with J. M. McLachlan, Leonard Hall and J. H. Belcher to the Green Manifesto. This was condemned by the majority on the NAC, and Douthwaite lost his seat on it at the next election, in 1911. However, that year he was elected to Bredbury and Romiley Urban District Council (UDC), winning on the drawing of lots, as he had tied with a Conservative candidate.

In 1912, Douthwaite attended the Socialist Unity conference organised by the Social Democratic Federation. This formed the British Socialist Party (BSP), and Douthwaite joined the new party. He was immediately elected to its Standing Order Committee, alongside Duncan Carmichael, Peter Petroff and E. C. Fairchild, and the four worked together to ensure voices in the party opposing British rearmament were heard. The BSP affiliated to the Labour Party, and Douthwaite devoted much of his time to it, being re-elected to the council in its colours in 1914, soon leaving the BSP.

Douthwaite focused on local politics during and after World War I, chairing the UDC and the Macclesfield Divisional Labour Party. He stood unsuccessfully for Stockport at the 1935 general election, but was elected to Cheshire County Council in 1937. He finally lost his seat on the UDC in 1947, but served on the county council until his death in 1949.

Party political offices
Preceded by William Williams	Lancashire Division representative on the Independent Labour Party National Administrative Council; 1910–1911	Succeeded by R. C. Wallhead
