= Peter Petroff (communist) =

Peter Petroff (Russian: Петр Петров; 1884 – 12 June 1947) was a Russian activist, journalist, active in the United Kingdom, and Germany.

== Early life and the 1905 Revolution ==
Born to a Jewish family in Ostropol, Ukraine, Petroff became a carpenter. With a yearning to learn and 'an urge for the distant', Petroff moved to Odessa in 1898 where he informally attended university classes and organised his first workers' study circle and in 1901 joined the (illegal) Russian Social Democratic Labour Party (RSDLP), spending several stints in prison for his activities. He was a party organiser by the time of the 1905 Russian Revolution, during which he was very active, organising a socialist group within the Russian Army, and leading an uprising in Voronezh. He was seriously injured, captured and exiled to Siberia, but escaped and made his way to Geneva, then on to the UK in April 1907 for the congress of the RSDLP in London.

== Coming to prominence in Britain ==
Once in London, Petroff initially encountered the cultural life of Jewish emigres, an inter-party centre of Russian emigres and was introduced to the Communist Club which functioned as the central rendez-vous of the capital's foreign socialists. Morgan (2013) corrects the historical record: "Petroff had not therefore Made his way to London through Leith and Glasgow, as has previously been understood. Nor was it Maclean who taught him English, which he 'seriously took to learning' in the East End and describes speaking fluently before ever setting foot in Glasgow." Petroff's autobiography describes his first visit to Scotland to carry out political work among four hundred Russian sailors stationed with a new Russian flagship sometime around 1907. It was there, in Glasgow-Clydebank, he wrote that he linked up with organised Social Democratic Party and several significant figures, although his political connections with Maclean at this time now appear from Petroff's own account appear to have been considerably overstated.

After a further interlude in Paris, Petroff settled once more in London making his living through journalism and translations. For 1910-1915 Petroff was a delegate at all but one of the SDP's national conferences, the exception being the unity conference of 1911 giving rise to the British Socialist Party (BSP).

However, he became a leading opponent of the party's leadership, which he felt was ineffective, undemocratic, and nationalistic. The SDF reformed as the British Socialist Party (BSP) in 1912, and Petroff was elected to its first standing orders committee, alongside Duncan Carmichael, E. C. Fairchild and C. T. Douthwaite. The four worked together to ensure voices in the party opposing British rearmament were heard. Maclean shared Petroff's views on the party leadership, and led an unsuccessful campaign in 1914 for a reduction in the leadership's control and also for a more stable party programme, adopting one overall programme for each general election. Petroff stood as an anti-militarist candidate for the executive of the BSP that year, but was defeated by H. M. Hyndman . Instead, he accepted work as the political organiser of the Glasgow branch of the BSP.

== Red Clydeside ==
An opponent of World War I, he gave talks which attracted large crowds and influenced members of the Clyde Workers Committee (CWC). He criticised the CWC for focusing solely on industrial action and not campaigning on wider political issues.

Nonetheless, he wrote articles on the progress of the movement for Nashe Slovo and Berner Tagwacht, raising its profile among socialist anti-war activists across Europe.

Increasingly alarmed by the growth of anti-war feeling in the party, Hyndman attacked his opponents through the party's pro-war socialist newspaper, Justice. Hyndman's December 1915 article, "Who and What is Peter Petroff", gave useful information to the authorities about Petroff's activities, and within the next month he was twice fined for breaking the Aliens Protection Order, then imprisoned for two months which was extended into indefinite internment being removed to Cornwallis Road, Islington; his wife, Irma Gellrich, was interned separately.

== Soviet Union and later life ==
In January 1918, Petroff and Gellrich were repatriated to the Soviet Union alongside Georgy Chicherin, the British government acceding to a request by Trotsky; Petroff was made Vice-Commissar for Foreign Affairs, taking over from Zalkind. He subsequently served as Chairman of the Foreign Relations Committee, and Chairman of the Political Section of the Supreme Military Inspection of the Red Army. Although barred from visiting the UK, he remained in contact with Maclean, and also Tom Quelch and James Clunie. In 1921, he was sent to Germany, to support the communist party there. He was sympathetic to Trotsky's Left Opposition, and resigned from the Bolshevik Party in 1925, but remained active in the German communist movement until the Nazi rise to power.

Petroff and Gellrich fled to Britain in 1933, where he worked as a journalist, principally for overseas newspapers. Given his opposition to Stalin, he faced hostility from the Communist Party of Great Britain, and instead joined the Labour Party, writing extensively for its journal, Labour. In 1934 he and his wife wrote The Secret of Hitler`s Victory: The Causes of the Breakdown of the German Republic published in hardback by the Hogarth Press. With the onset of World War II, his work dried up, but he remained in London until his death, eight years later.
