= Workers Party of Hungary =

Political party in Hungary

Workers Party of Hungary Magyarországi Munkáspárt
- Abbreviation: MÁMP
- Founded: 1878
- Dissolved: 1880
- Merged into: General Workers Party of Hungary
- Headquarters: Budapest
- Newspaper: Népszava
- Ideology: Socialism
- Political position: Left-wing

The Workers Party of Hungary (Hungarian: Magyarországi Munkáspárt, MÁMP) was a political party in Hungary, founded around the time of the 1878 election. The mainly made up by socialists from Budapest, and the party strove to create trade unions and fought for minimum wage and a 10-hour working day. The main organ of the party was Népszava. The party was in conflict with the other contemporary Hungarian socialist party, the Non-Voters Party, which it accused of being government stooges. In 1880 the two parties did however merge, forming the Hungarian General Labour Party.
