= Eleanor Barton =

British co-operative movement activist

Eleanor Barton JP
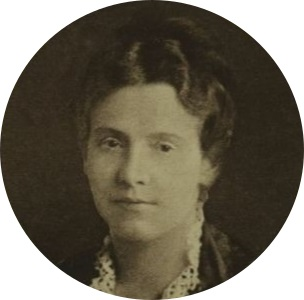
- Barton in 1922
- Born: Eleanor Stockton; 13 July 1872; Ardwick, Manchester, England
- Died: 9 March 1960 (aged 87); Papatoetoe, New Zealand
- Movement: Co-operative
- Spouse: Alfred Barton (m. 1872; died 1933)
- Children: 2

Eleanor Barton JP (née Stockton; 13 July 1872 – 9 March 1960) was a British co-operative movement activist from Manchester.

== Early life and family ==
Barton was born in Manchester, the daughter of William Stockton, a prison warden born from Shropshire, and Julia [née Farrar] Stockton from Liverpool. Her maternal grandmother, born in Ireland, also lived with them while Eleanor was growing up. Little is known of her early life, but it is believed her family was active in the labour movement in Manchester.

== Activism ==
In 1894, she married Alfred Barton, a librarian and active anarchist at the time, and the two moved to Sheffield. Both became heavily involved in the local socialist and co-operative movements; Eleanor joined the Brightside and Carbrook Co-operative's Women's Co-operative Guild, and became secretary of its Hillsborough branch, then serving in succession on the district, Yorkshire and central committees of the Guild. She was elected as national treasurer in 1913, then as president the following year.

Barton went on a speaking tour of the United States in 1919, invited by the Labor Party of America, talking about child welfare. In 1921, she became assistant secretary of the guild, then secretary in 1925, serving until 1937. She spent her time in office refocusing the guild away from handicrafts and towards education and the social sciences.

In 1919, Barton was elected to Sheffield City Council as a joint Labour Party and Co-operative Party candidate, one of the first two women elected in the city. She stood for the Co-operative Party in Birmingham King's Norton at the 1922 and 1923 general elections, then in Nottingham Central in 1929, but was never elected.

During the 1930s, Barton promoted the white poppy symbol for the Guild, and was prominent in the Peace Pledge Union and Hands Off Russia campaign. She also held numerous co-operative movement posts, including directorships of the Co-operative Permanent Building Society and the Co-operative Newspaper Publishing Society.

By 1949, Barton's husband and son had both died, and she moved to Papatoetoe, New Zealand to live with her daughter, Mrs. Linda Bennett. She died at their home in Papatoetoe in 1960.

Non-profit organization positions
Preceded by Honora Enfield	Secretary of the Women's Co-operative Guild; 1925–1937	Succeeded by Rose Simpson
