= Alf Watts =

British communist (1862–1928)

Alfred Augustus Watts (1862–1928), also known as A. A. Watts and "Alf" Watts, was an early organiser and politician in the British socialist and communist movements.

Born in Bow, London, Watts learned the compositor trade. His political activism began when he joined the Social Democratic Federation (SDF). In 1904, he became a member of the Board of Guardians in Poplar, a post he held until his death. After the SDF evolved into the British Socialist Party (BSP), he was part of the BSP leadership team (alongside Albert Inkpin and John Maclean), serving as Treasurer. Watts was an outspoken opponent of World War I, while supporting the October Revolution. He was a founding member of the Communist Party of Great Britain (CPGB).

In 1919, Watts was elected as the Labour Party's candidate for London County Council representing Battersea North. In March 1922 he was re-elected as an openly Communist Councillor. In 1925, he was elected as a Councillor for Poplar Council, with the support of both Labour and the CPGB.

Watts died on 11 February 1928, after an illness of several weeks.
