= Alf Barton =

British socialist politician

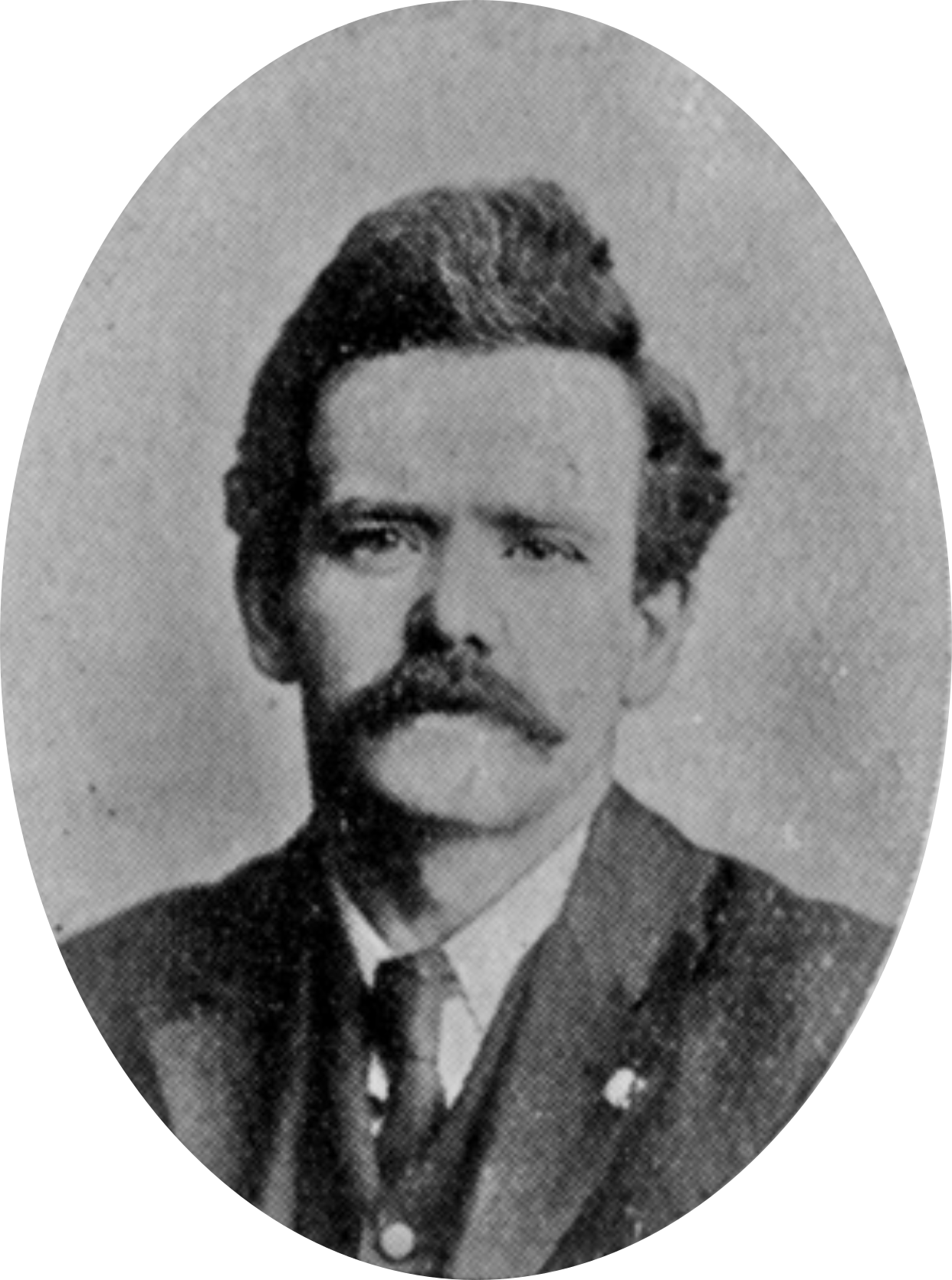
- Born: Alfred Barton; 30 July 1868; Kempston, Bedfordshire, England
- Died: 9 December 1933 (aged 65)
- Political party: Independent Labour Party; Social Democratic Federation; British Socialist Party; Labour Party
- Spouse: Eleanor Stockton (m. 1894)

Alfred Barton (30 July 1868 – 9 December 1933) was a British socialist politician.

== Early life ==
Born in Kempston in Bedfordshire, Barton began working in a library at the age of twelve. He joined the Socialist League at some point in the 1880s, then in about 1890, he moved to Manchester, where he quickly found work at the John Rylands Library. At this time, Alf was on the anarchist wing of the Socialist League, and was prominent in the protests following the police provocations against Walsall Anarchists. Although he was arrested several times for making speeches, he was firmly opposed to violence in the anarchist cause.

== Later life ==
Barton married Eleanor Stockton in 1894, who was to become prominent in the co-operative movement, and the two moved to Sheffield in 1897. Alf joined the Independent Labour Party (ILP) and quickly became prominent locally through his opposition to the Second Boer War; he later also joined the Social Democratic Federation. He joined the Shop Assistants' Union and was its delegate to Sheffield Federated Trades Council, and within it campaigned for it to affiliate to the Labour Representation Committee. It did so, but resulting disagreements about local candidates led the council to split, Barton being prominent on the local Labour Representation Committee. In 1907, he was elected to Sheffield City Council for the renamed Labour Party, representing Brightside.

In 1907, Barton was appointed as secretary of the Sheffield ILP, and he also edited its weekly newspaper, the Sheffield Guardian. However, he lost his council seat in 1910, and in 1911 he resigned from the ILP entirely due to disagreements between himself and Joseph Pointer. The Labour Party would not endorse him in that year's local elections, so he instead ran for the SDF in Heeley, and was not successful. He persuaded Labour not to stand against him in Brightside in following years, and won his seat back in 1913. The SDF became the British Socialist Party (BSP) and in 1914 affiliated to the Labour Party, Barton becoming an official part of its group on the council once more. He was shortlisted as the party's candidate for the 1914 Sheffield Attercliffe by-election, but was not selected.

Barton supported British involvement in World War I, but he remained in the BSP rather than joining one of its pro-war splits. He stood unsuccessfully for Labour in Sheffield Park at the 1918 general election, then briefly joined the Communist Party of Britain (CPGB) on its formation, but resigned after less than a month, to rejoin the ILP and, by extension, the Labour Party. He stood in Harwich at the 1922 general election, losing his deposit, and the same year also lost his council seat, although he won a seat in Hillsborough in 1926. In 1929, he moved to represent Owlerton, also becoming an alderman, and served until his death in 1933.

Party political offices
Preceded by Fred Shaw	President of the British Socialist Party; 1919	Succeeded by Joe Vaughan
