= The Call (BSP) =

British socialist magazine (1916–1920)

The Call was a publication of the British Socialist Party (BSP) which appeared in London from 24 February 1916 until 29 July 1920. Originally it was the voice of the British Socialist Party's anti-war faction, who succeeded in changing the BSP's earlier pro-war stance. After the Easter conference, 24-25 April 1916, it became the official publication of the BSP. The first editor was Fred Willis of Willesden, but Albert Inkpin subsequently took over the role.

== Contributors ==
The Call published contributions from many notable writers:

- Dora Montefiore
- Walton Newbold
- Theodore Rothstein
- John MacLean
