= Edward Tupper =

British trade unionist

Tupper addressing a strike meeting in 1911

Edward Tupper (12 April 1872 – 22 October 1942) was a British trade unionist active in the National Sailors' and Firemen's Union, who was particularly prominent in the 1911 strike in Cardiff.

Born in Worthing in West Sussex, Tupper joined the British Army in 1888, but was soon discharged on medical grounds. He joined the Liberal Party, and in 1903 was asked to be a Liberal-Labour candidate in Buckingham at the next general election, but turned this down.

In 1910, Tupper met Havelock Wilson, leader of the National Sailors' and Firemen's Union (NSFU). Impressed by Tupper's skills, Wilson employed him as a private detective, and then in various union roles. Tupper was prominent in organising the 1911 seamen's strike. By this time, he had invented a colourful history for himself. In a newspaper article, Tupper claimed to have been born in Hamilton, Ontario. However this and a number of other claims — that he had been a captain, that he was awarded the VC and that he had trained for the priesthood in a monastery – have not been substantiated and do not appear in his autobiography. Numerous travel logs for Tupper list his place of birth as England, and there is no record of his birth in Ontario.

Tupper attended the Council of Workers' and Soldiers' Delegates held on 3 June 1917 in Leeds.

Tupper served as National Organiser of the union for many years, until his retirement in 1936.
