= Non-Voters Party =

Non-Voters Party Nemválasztók Pártja
- Abbreviation: NVP
- Leader: Leó Frankel
- Founded: 1878
- Dissolved: 1880
- Merged into: General Workers Party of Hungary
- Ideology: Socialism
- Political position: Left-wing

The Non-Voters Party (Hungarian: Nemválasztók Pártja, NVP) was a socialist political party in Hungary, founded around the time of the 1878 election. At the founding meeting of the party, 79 delegates participated. The party sought to represent the non-enfranchised population, and advocated universal suffrage and democratic reforms. The party was led by Leó Frankel. In 1880 the party merged into the Hungarian General Labour Party.
