= W. P. Coates =

Irish labour activist (1883–1963)

William Peyton "Pat" Coates (1883, Kinsale – 8 August 1963) was an Irish labour activist and communist who was active in the sphere of Anglo-Soviet relations.

== Biography ==
In 1901, he took a clerical position on the railways, and by 1903 was a member of the Railway Clerks Association and subsequently its successor, the Transport Salaries Staffs Association. He joined the Social Democratic Federation, later joining the British Socialist Party (BSP).

In 1913, he married Zelda Kahan.

He became the BSP's National Organiser in March 1919 and was involved in founding the Communist Party of Great Britain.

In September 1919, when the National Hands Off Russia Committee was formed at a conference in Manchester, Coates became its secretary. He filled this post until the Ramsay MacDonald government established diplomatic relations with the U.S.S.R. The committee was then transformed into the Anglo-Russian Parliamentary Committee. Coates retained the position of secretary of this organisation until his death.

In 1923, he visited Russia.

== Works ==
- (1923) Present Position of Anglo-Russian Relations London: National "Hands off Russia" Committee
- (1923) Export credit schemes and Anglo-Russian trade London: National "Hands off Russia" Committee
- (1924) Why Russia should be recognised London: National "Hands off Russia" Committee
- (1924) Russia's counter-claims London: National "Hands off Russia" Committee
- (1928) Why Anglo-Russian Diplomatic Relations Should be Restored London: Anglo-Soviet Parliamentary Committee
- (1931) Is Soviet Trade a Menace? London: Anglo-Soviet Parliamentary Committee (with Zelda Kahan)
- (1935) Armed Intervention in Russia 1918-1922 London: V. Gollancz
- (1938) From Tsardom to the Stalin Constitution London:G. Allen and Unwin
- (1939) World Affairs and the U.S.S.R.
- (1940) Russia, Finland and the Baltic London : Lawrence and Wishart
- (1940) The Soviet-Finnish Campaign: Military & Political, 1939-1940
- (1943) A History of Anglo-Soviet Relations Vol. I. (1943)
- (1948) Six Centuries of Russo-Polish Relations London: Lawrence and Wishart
- (1951) Soviets in Central Asia
- (1958) A History of Anglo-Soviet Relations Vol. II.
