= International Socialist Congress =

International Socialist Congress may refer to:

- International Workers Congresses of Paris, 1889
- International Socialist Congress, Paris 1900
- International Socialist Congress, Amsterdam 1904
- International Socialist Congress, Stuttgart 1907
- International Socialist Congress, Copenhagen 1910

== See also ==
- International Workers Congresses of Paris, 1889
