= Sheffield Co-operative Society =

Consumers' co-operative in England

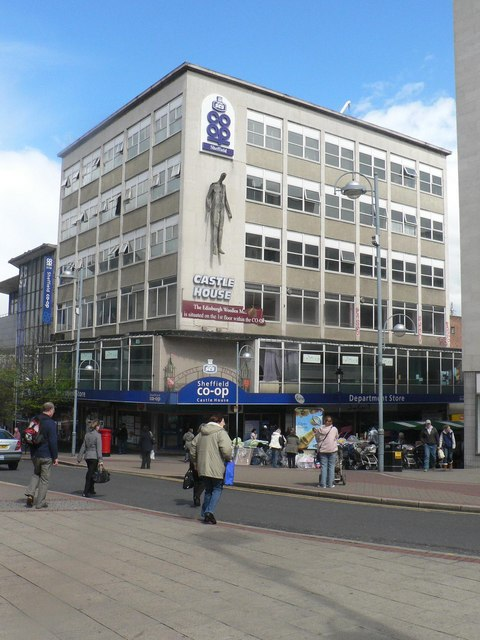
Castle House, former Sheffield Co-operative department store

The Sheffield Co-operative Society was a local consumers' co-operative trading in Sheffield, South Yorkshire, England.

The Society was founded as the Brightside and Carbrook Co-operative and opened its first shop in 1868, in the Carbrook suburb of Sheffield.

== Castle House ==
The Co-op opened shops around the city, and set up its first branch in Sheffield City Centre in 1929, on the corner of Exchange Street and Waingate, on part of the former site of Sheffield Castle. In 1962, this moved to a new site named "Castle House", in tribute to the site of the old store.

The Castle House department store was designed by G. S Hay of the Co-operative Wholesale Society and occupied a large site, with entrances on King Street, Angel Street and Castle Street. The store, which also housed the headquarters of the Brightside and Carbrook, featured a massive granite facade with a zigzag canopy. Inside, the focus was on a cantilevered spiral staircase connecting all the floors, under a partially glazed dome and a sculpture of a bird.

In 2009, the building was granted Grade II listed building status. In 2018, the National Videogame Museum opened on the ground floor.

== Members ==
Eleanor Barton, a prominent co-operative movement activist, was for many years the secretary of the Brightside and Carbrook's Hillsborough branch, and later became a director of the organisation. Other prominent members included Michael Palin, who joined the Brightside and Carbrook Co-operative Players in the 1960s.

== Mergers ==
In the 1980s, the Brightside and Carbrook Co-op planned to merge with the Sheffield and Ecclesall Co-operative to form the Sheffield Co-operative Society. It never happened, but the name change went through.

By 2006, the Society had 35 grocery shops, six travel stores, four petrol stations, seven funeral parlours and three department stores. However, the group faced competition within Sheffield from both the United Co-operatives and the Co-operative Group.

In 2007, the Society voted to merge with the United Co-operatives, which itself merged with the Co-operative Group shortly afterwards. All three of the former Society's department stores, including Castle House, were closed in 2008.
