= Zelda Kahan =

British communist (1886–1969)

Zelda Kahan (1886 – 1969) was a British socialist and later communist activist.

Born into a Jewish family in Russia in 1886, Kahan's family were forced to emigrate, and she moved to Britain at an early age. The Kahans lived at 6 Clapton Square in Hackney, London. She became an active socialist and joined the Social Democratic Federation (SDF). Within the SDF, she was a leading opponent of Ernest Belfort Bax's anti-feminism, and an ardent anti-militarist. After a resolution she proposed to the conference of the SDF's successor, the British Socialist Party, was approved against the wishes of the party leadership, she was elected to its executive. She worked alongside Theodore Rothstein in opposition to World War I, and supported the foundation of the Communist Party of Great Britain (CPGB).

Kahan married fellow communist William Peyton Coates (died 8 Aug 1963), and became known as Zelda Coates. Together, they set up the Anglo-Russian Parliamentary Committee. The Coates lived at 37 Coolhurst Road, Hornsey, London N8 in later days.

== Works ==
- (1918) Karl Marx: His Life and Teaching London: British Socialist Party
- (1920) The life and work of Friedrich Engels London: The Communist Party of Great Britain
- (1968) "Memories of Lenin in London, 1902-3 and 1907", Labour Monthly, November 1968, pp 506–508

Co written with W. P Coates:

- (1935) Armed Intervention in Russia 1918-1922 London: V. Gollancz
- (1938) From Tsardom to the Stalin Constitution London:G. Allen and Unwin
- (1939) World Affairs and the U. S. S. R. London : Lawrence and Wishart
- (1940) Russia, Finland and the Baltic London : Lawrence and Wishart
- (1940) The Soviet-Finnish Campaign: Military & Political, 1939-1940
- (1942) Why Russia Will Win London : Eldon Press
- (1943) A History of Anglo-Soviet Relations (Volume I Volume II London: Lawrence and Wishart
- (1951) Soviets in Central Asia London: Lawrence and Wishart
