= International Workers Congresses of Paris, 1889 =

Two congresses which were held in Paris, beginning on 14 July 1889

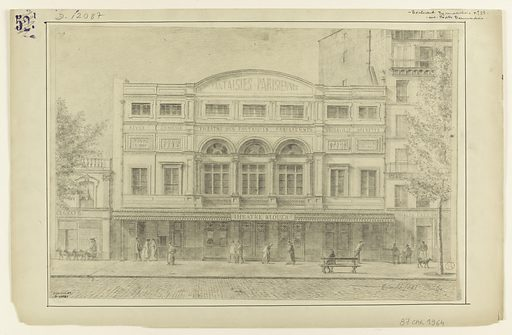
The theatre "Fantaisies parisiennes," site of the initial Marxist congress, in 1881.

The first meetings of the Second International were held in Paris, beginning on 14 July 1889, on the centenary of the storming of the Bastille. Internecine conflicts within the French socialist movement had prompted the "possibilist" and Marxist factions to hold their own congresses at the same time. The Marxist congress resolved to arrange a second meeting at Zurich, while the Possibilists would arrange one in Brussels. However the Marxist organizing committee would later decide to join the Brussels congress, and the next congress would meet in 1891.

== Question of unity ==
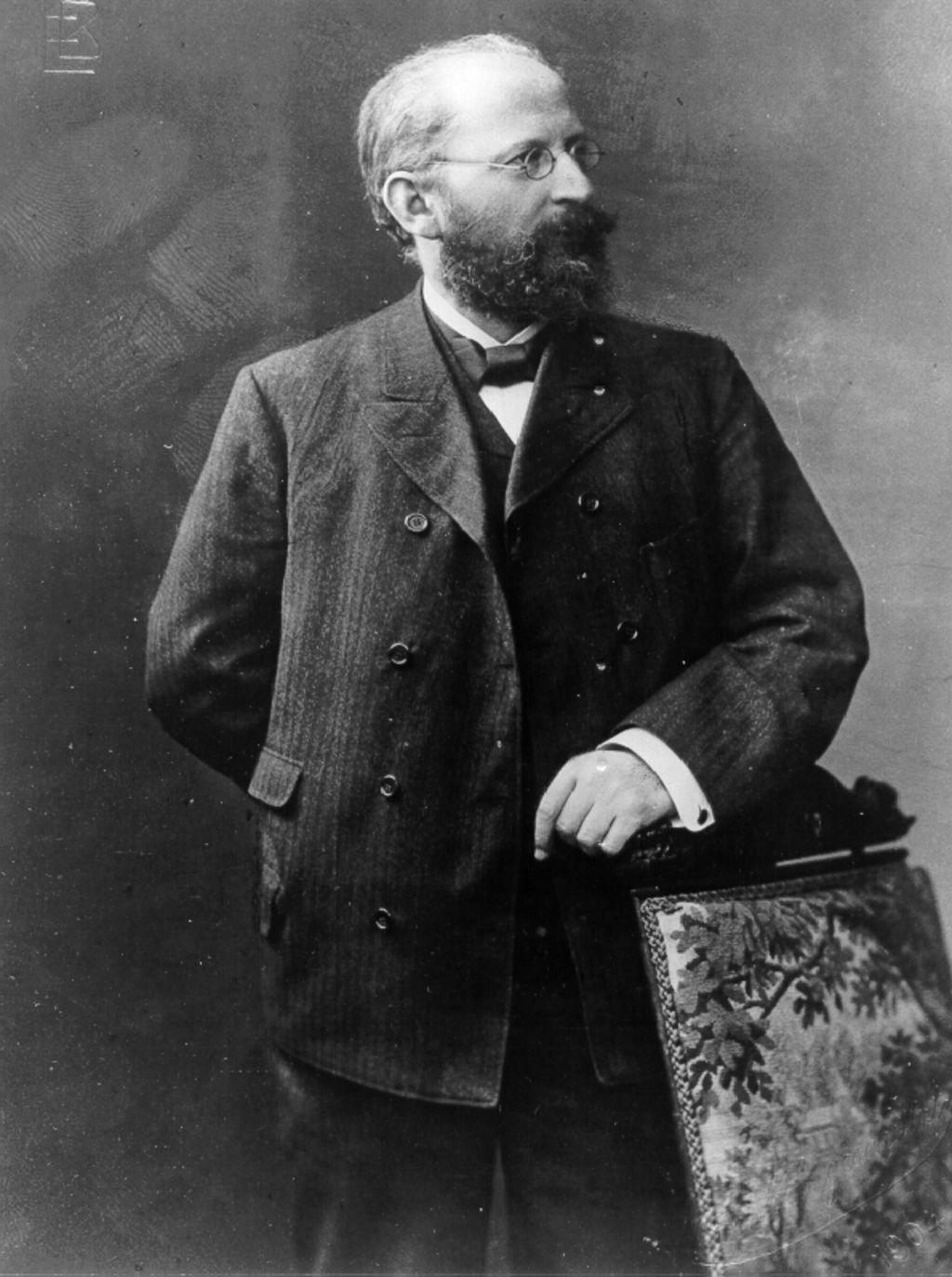
Eduard Bernstein later alleged that the split conferences resulted from mistreatment of the SPD by the French possibilists.

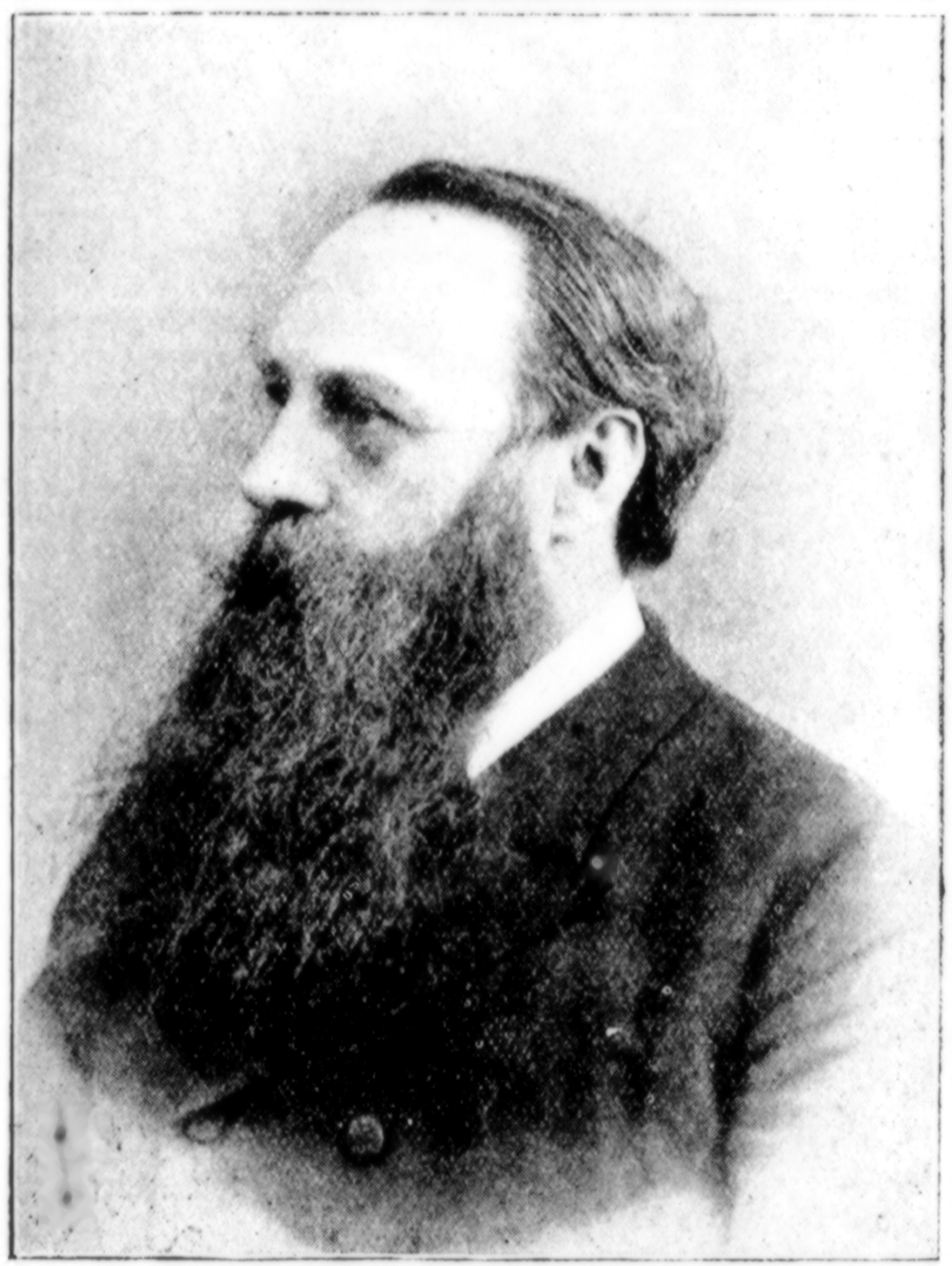
Henry Hyndman argued that only "bona fide" workers' parties could be represented at the congress.

The split between the Marxist and possibilist factions had a long history within the Federation of the Socialist Workers of France. From its founding in 1879, a faction inspired (though not always endorsed) by Paul Brousse had moved away from revolutionary socialism towards a more reformist approach, arguing that socialists should pursue whichever reforms are "possible" at any given time, while still taking advantage of revolutionary opportunities. A Marxist faction led by Jules Guesde and Paul Lafargue, and supported by Karl Marx and Friedrich Engels, denounced the possibilist faction as opportunists, founding the rival French Workers' Party in 1882. Confusingly, both parties would call themselves the Parti Ouvrier (workers' party), and so were generally known as the Marxist party and possibilist party.

The possibilist party had convened international congresses several times before, in 1883, 1884, and 1886. At the 1886 convention, it was decided that another convention would be held in 1889, but the Social Democratic Party of Germany had disagreed with the decision, and the decisions at the 1886 convention were generally seen to have lacked legitimacy. The SPD had held its own convention in St. Gallen in 1887, whereupon they decided to hold their own international conference the following year. When the London International Trades Union Congress declared that a new international meeting would be called in Paris in 1889, both the SPD and Possibilists decided to fold their next congress into the new one, creating one large international meeting. However, the SPD had joined the new meeting on the condition that the hosts would not ask for records and names from the delegates, since the SPD could have faced immediate dissolution and ejection from the Reichstag if the German government discovered it had sent delegates abroad. When the Trade Union Congress responded that delegates would only be considered legitimate if they could prove their mandate with appropriate records, the SPD and their Marxist supporters decided to hold a separate congress near the Possibilist congress, with the hope of uniting the two at a later date. The separation into two congresses in 1889 effectively forced foreign delegations to divide themselves up between supporters of the Possibilists, and supporters of the SPD.

Despite the split, both congresses began their meetings with a discussion of unifying with the other congress. At the possibilist congress, unity was first proposed by John Burns, and was opposed by Henry Hyndman and Adolphe Smith, who questioned whether the Marxist delegates really represented workers' organizations or simply themselves. When Burns insisted upon unity, Hyndman countered that such a proposal could only be considered upon the "verification of mandates," or proof that the Marxists represented real parties. While Burns and Amilcare Cipriani advocated for unconditional unity, the majority of the congress came to agree with Hyndman after an impassioned speech from Annie Besant, who repudiated accusations that the appeal for verification was made in bad faith, and argued that only "bona fide" parties should be represented. After conditional unity was agreed upon, the Italian delegation was entrusted with negotiating between congresses.

Much like the possibilist congress, the Marxist congress had itself split into factions over the question of unity, with one side in favor of accepting any terms from the other congress, and the other opposing unity. The latter camp was led by William Morris and the Socialist League, who had a long history of conflict with Hyndman, arguing that the possibilist congress were not socialists, and were not internationalists since they had excluded the German delegation. The French were also strongly opposed to union, while the Belgian, Dutch, and Italian delegates wished to bring the conferences together. Wilhelm Liebknecht ultimately put forward a motion that unity would be accepted, but only on an unconditional basis, which was passed with a large majority. Since it became clear that the Possibilist congress would only accept unity after the verification of mandates, and the Marxists could not agree to those terms, the unity negotiations were broken off soon after.

Despite failing to achieve unity, many delegates chose to travel between conferences, such as Burns and Cipriani. Generally speaking the various international delegations that did not fall into the competing British, French, and German factions tried to represent themselves at both congresses.

== Marxist Congress ==
The International Socialist Workers Congress of Paris was scheduled to meet at the Salle Petrelle, but soon had to move to larger accommodations at 42, rue Rochechouart. The initial reception was held at the music hall, the Fantaisies Parisiennes, wherein a high platform and rows of boxes had been erected to evoke the image of the National Assembly of 1793.

The Marxist congress passed resolutions on international labor legislation (the eight-hour workday, night work, labor conditions for women and children), the abolition of permanent armies, and the various means to attain these goals. It also passed a resolution calling for an international demonstration for the eight-hour working day on 1 May.

While it was known as the Marxist congress due to the large French Workers' Party and Social Democratic Party of Germany delegations, many of the delegates were in fact Blanquists, anarchists, or other revolutionary non-Marxists. As a result, there was not a great deal of ideological unity, and the congress had to restrict itself to very broad proposals. When these broad proposals were objected to, there was often very little tolerance of dissent, such as when the anarchist Francesco Saverio Merlino was nearly attacked by other delegates, only to be shielded by members of the Socialist League.

The Marxist Congress is traditionally considered the founding Congress of the Second International, although the International as a distinct organizational body was not formalized until the incorporation of the International Socialist Bureau in 1900.

=== Attendees ===
Country	# of delegates	Remarks
Alsace-Lorraine	1	Representing the Republican Socialist Union of Alsace-Lorraine
Argentina	1	Representing the "Socialist group of Buenos Aires"
Austria	9	
Belgium	14	Representing the Belgian Labour Party.
Bohemia	1	
Bulgaria	1	Represented by one of the Romanian delegates
Denmark	3	Representing the Socialist Party of Denmark
Finland	1	
France	221	Representing the French Workers' Party
Germany	81	Representing the Social Democratic Party of Germany
Great Britain	20	Representing the Socialist League; Scottish Labour Party; Bloomsbury Socialist Society;
Greece	1	
Hungary	3	
Italy	13	Representing the Italian Workers' Party
Netherlands	4	Representing the Social Democratic League
Norway	3	
Poland	4	Representing Second Proletariat
Portugal	1	Representing the Labour Party of Portugal
Romania	5	
Russia	6	Representing Emancipation of Labour
Spain	2	Representing PSOE
Sweden	2	Representing the Swedish Social Democratic Party
Switzerland	2	Representing the Social Democratic Party of Switzerland
United States	5	Representing the Socialist Labor Party of America; German Workers Union of New York; United Hebrew Trades; United Brothers League of Iowa

== Possibilist Congress ==
The International Workers Congress, or possibilist congress met at #10, rue de Lancry.

The possibilist congress passed resolutions on universal suffrage, trust, international labor legislation, and on the means of creating a permanent means of relation between the autonomous socialist and workers groups.

In one incident a boulangist delegate was accused of disrupting the proceedings and threatened with expulsion, but was allowed to stay after a speech on tolerance by a Mr. Fenwick.

=== Attendees ===
Country	# of delegates	Remarks
Austria	6	Representing the Social Democratic Party of Austria
Belgium	8	Representing the Belgian Labour Party.
Denmark	2	
France	477	Representing the Federation of the Socialist Workers of France
Great Britain	39	Representing the Dublin Socialist Club; Metropolitan Radical Federation; Fabian Society; Knights of Labour, Birmingham; National Union of Gas Workers and General Labourers; Social Democratic Federation
Hungary	6	Representing the General Workers Party of Hungary
Netherlands	2	
Poland	1	
Russia	1	
Spain	5	
Switzerland	1	
United States	4	Representing the International Typographical Union; Knights of Labor
