= Fred Willis (communist) =

Frederick George Willis (1873 – 1947) was a British socialist activist.

Born in London, Willis began working in the field of woodworking machinery, later working as a collector for the London Society of Tailors and Tailoresses. He joined the Social Democratic Federation (SDF) in the 1890s, and stood unsuccessfully for its executive committee in 1898. He remained in the SDF's successor, the British Socialist Party (BSP), and became prominent when the anti-World War I majority of the party overthrew its pro-war leadership.

Willis supported the BSP's affiliation to the Labour Party, and became one of the party's leading figures in Willesden. Inspired by the October Revolution, the BSP decided to form a single, national, communist party, and this led Edwin C. Fairchild to resign from the party. Willis succeeded Fairchild as editor of the BSP's newspaper, The Call, in which he advocated for the formation of soviets.

The Communist Party of Great Britain was founded in 1920, and Willis became the first editor of its newspaper, The Call, and was also elected to its executive committee. He soon lost both positions, instead working at the party's headquarters, in charge of its publishing. This position was not a success, and he moved to be a cashier for Arcos and ROP, two Soviet companies.

Willis remained active in the CPGB, regularly attending its congresses, and serving on its control commission in 1927/1928. He left the cashier role in 1928, and resigned from the CPGB in 1929.

Media offices
| Preceded by Edwin C. Fairchild | Editor of The Call; 1919–1920 | Succeeded by Newspaper closed |
| Preceded by New position | Editor of The Communist; 1920–1921 | Succeeded by Francis Meynell |
