= Proteus (video game) =

2013 video game

- Designers: Ed Key; David Kanaga
- Composer: David Kanaga
- Platforms: Windows, OS X, Linux, PlayStation 3, PlayStation Vita
- Release: Windows, OS X 30 January 2013; Linux; 8 April 2013; PS3, Vita: NA: 29 October 2013; PAL: 30 October 2013
- Genre: Adventure
- Mode: Single-player

Proteus is a 2013 adventure game designed and created by Ed Key and David Kanaga for Microsoft Windows, OS X, Linux, PlayStation 3, PlayStation 4 and PlayStation Vita. In the game, the player traverses a procedurally generated environment without prescribed goals. The world's flora and fauna emit unique musical signatures, combinations of which cause dynamic shifts in audio based on the player's surroundings.

The game began development in 2008. Key first conceived Proteus as an open-ended role-playing game akin to The Elder Scrolls IV: Oblivion but, because of the work required for such a project, later redesigned it to be "nontraditional and nonviolent". Audio designer and composer David Kanaga joined the project in 2010. Versions for the PlayStation 3 video game console and Vita handheld console were developed by Curve Studios, whose team added new gameplay features to the Vita edition at Sony's request.

Proteus won the prize for Best Audio at the 2011 IndieCade awards, and was a finalist for the 2012 Independent Games Festival's Nuovo Award. Following its release, critics praised the game, especially for its audio features, although some criticised the game's brevity and limited replayability. The game was frequently mentioned in discussions of video games as art, with some debating whether it could be considered a video game at all.

== Gameplay ==
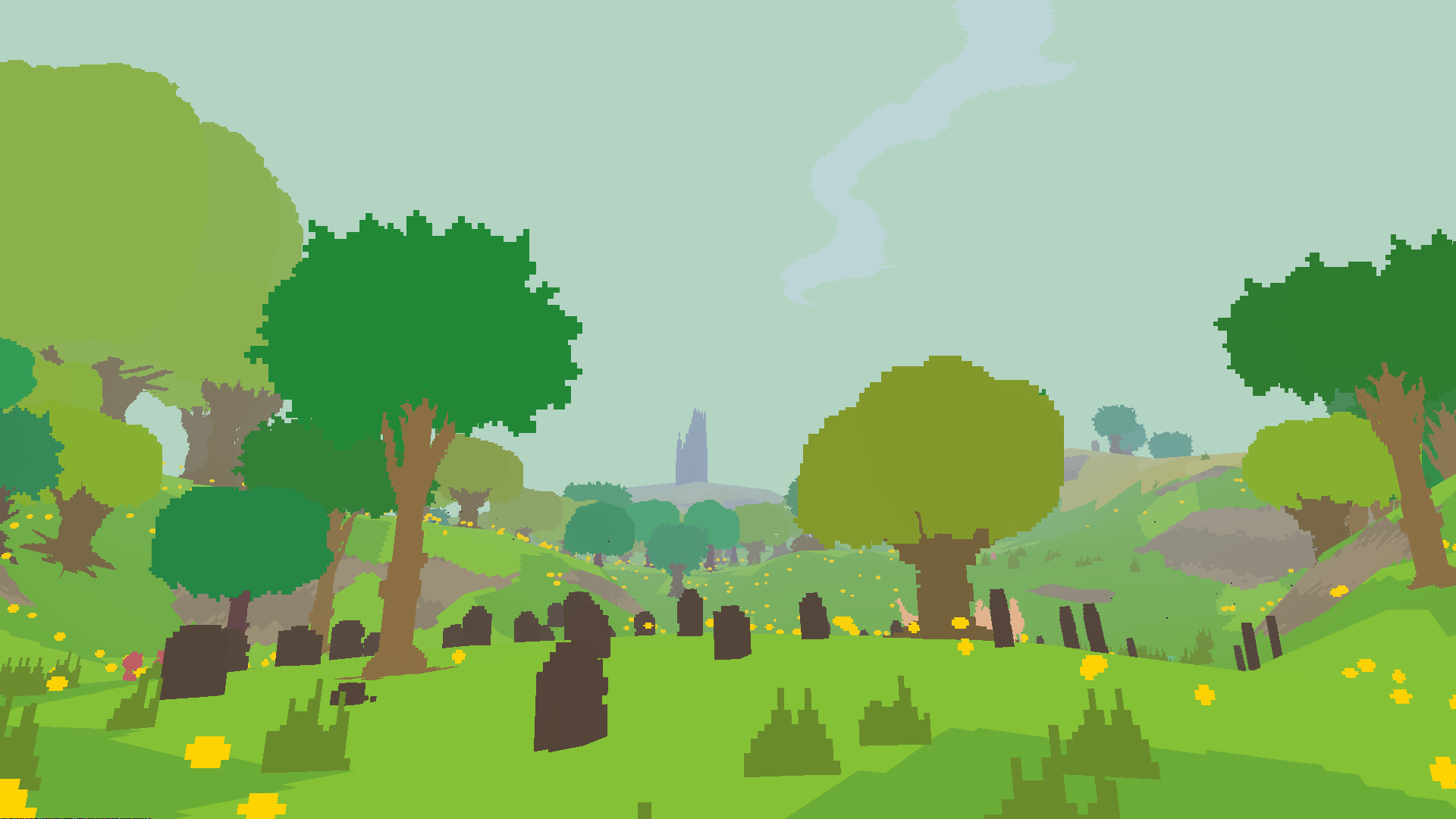
Areas have different sounds and music when players walk near or through them.

In Proteus the player explores an island from a first-person perspective. The island is drawn in a pixel art style and consists of hills, trees, structures, and animals such as frogs and rabbits; the layout of these elements is different each time the game is played. The focus of the game is on exploration rather than interaction, as there is no narrative and the player is given no instructions on how to proceed. Possible interactions are limited—for example, animals may run away when the player comes too close. The game's soundtrack varies depending on the player's movements and location; it may fall silent when the player is at the top of a hill and become sonically dense as they travel down it. The soundtrack layers additional sounds and notes when the player nears objects and animals in the world. Many things on the island are rendered as two-dimensional sprites, contrasting with the three-dimensional landscape.

When the game begins, the player is situated away from the island and must move across an ocean to reach it. Upon arrival, players are free to explore the whole island during the initial season of spring. During the night, the player can enter a designated area to advance time to the next season, exploring each until the end of winter, after which the game ends. The landscape changes with the season—for example, trees shed their leaves in autumn. The player can capture a screenshot via a "save a postcard" feature, through which they can save and load their progress.

In addition to the base gameplay elements, the PlayStation Vita version allows the player to directly affect the environment with the console's rear touch panel and to generate islands based on the current date and location in the real world.

== Development ==
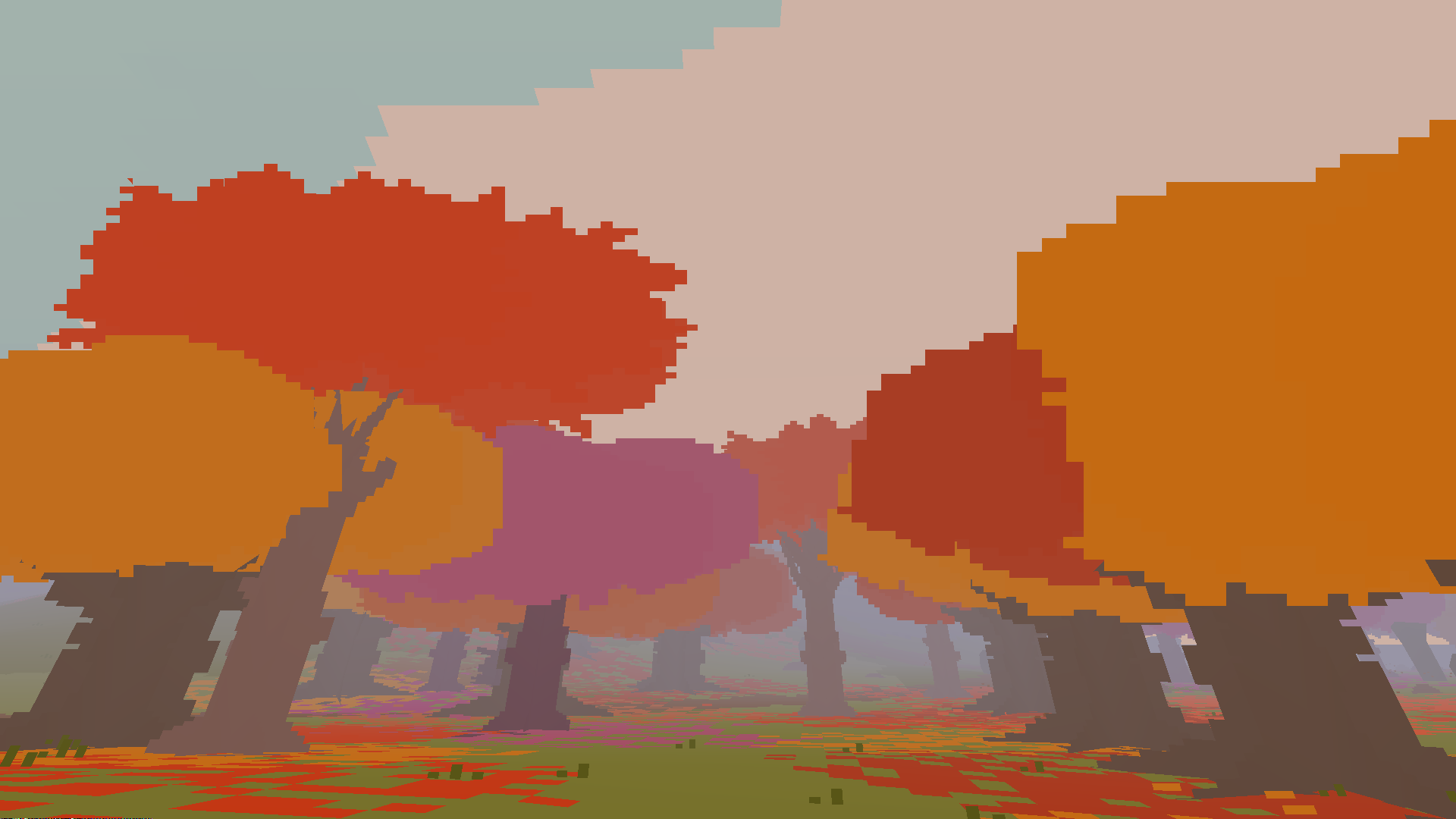
The island's visuals change with the seasons, such as orange and brown leaves during autumn.

British game designer Ed Key began work on Proteus in 2008 during his evenings and weekends, though the game neared its final form only when David Kanaga joined development in 2010. Key originally envisioned the game as a procedural role-playing game in the same vein as The Elder Scrolls IV: Oblivion, in which the player would visit towns and complete quests. Realizing the extent of the work that would be needed for such a game, the developers decided to instead make something "nontraditional and nonviolent". The first technology developed for the game was the landscape generator, for which Key was inspired by walking in the village of Avebury, England. While he knew he wanted to make an exploration game, Proteus went through a variety of early iterations as Key explored different gameplay ideas.

Key developed Proteus using a game engine written in the C# programming language. He found the game's visual style early in development, with the impressionistic tree design being one of the first he settled on. Art Deco and the work of Paul Nash have been cited as "big influences". After Kanaga joined the development team as its audio composer, the game's music and sound mechanics were refined through testing a wide range of ideas, including allowing players to create their own music within the game. This idea was ultimately cut because Key and Kanaga felt it would detract from the game's exploratory emphasis and instead turn it into a creative tool. During development, and after the game's release, the developers expressed interest in allowing player-created mods of the game; some have since been created by the community.

Proteus was released on 30 January 2013 for Windows and OS X, and on 8 April of the same year for Linux. When pre-orders opened in 2012, an Artifact Edition was also available—a version which included a boxed copy of the game containing artwork, the soundtrack, and notes on the game's development. Key apologised when the Artifact Edition had not yet shipped at the end of its release year, and offered to refund customers upon request. The edition became available for purchase in July 2016.

Around the time of the game's release, Curve Studios approached the developers to port the game for release on PlayStation 3 and Vita. These versions of the game use Curve Studio's own game engine. Sony requested that new features be added to the game, though Key said that the company never attempted to steer the direction of the development of these features. Key added location and date-based world generation and a method for changing the world's colours, using the Vita's rear touchpad. He stated in 2013 that the location- and date-specific world generation feature may come to the game's other versions in the future. The PlayStation 3 and Vita versions were released in October 2013.

== Reception ==
Reception

Aggregate score
Aggregator	Score		
Aggregator	PC	PS Vita	PS3
Metacritic	80/100	77/100	72/100

Review scores
Publication	Score		
Publication	PC	PS Vita	PS3
4Players	85%	85%	85%
Destructoid	8.5/10	N/A	N/A
Edge	8/10	N/A	N/A
Eurogamer	8/10	N/A	N/A
GameSpot	8/10	N/A	N/A
GameTrailers	7.4/10	N/A	N/A
IGN	8.5/10	N/A	N/A
PlayStation Official Magazine – UK	N/A	N/A	8/10
PC Gamer (UK)	76%	N/A	N/A
Pocket Gamer	N/A	3.5/5	N/A
Push Square	N/A	N/A	7/10
The Telegraph	4/5	N/A	N/A
The Guardian	5/5	N/A	N/A
The Digital Fix	N/A	N/A	3/10
Digital Spy	3/5	N/A	N/A

Awards
Publication	Award
Indiecade 2011	Best Audio
A MAZE. Indie Connect Festival	Most Amazing Indie Game

=== Pre-release ===
Before its full release, a beta version of Proteus was featured in a number of indie game festivals and received coverage from video game journalists. It won the 2011 IndieCade Award for Best Audio, and was shortlisted for the 2012 GameCity Prize, ultimately losing to Journey. Proteus was a finalist for the 2012 Independent Games Festival's Nuovo Award, a prize aimed at abstract and unconventional game development, and received honorable mentions in the Excellence in Audio and Seumas McNally Grand Prize categories. The game also won the Most Amazing Indie Game prize at the 2012 A MAZE. Indie Connect Festival and in the same year, was featured in the Museum of Modern Art's "Common Senses" exhibit.

In an article that discussed 2011's exploration games, Jim Rossignol of Rock Paper Shotgun described Proteus as "one of the most charming experiences" he had had in an indie game. An IGN preview found the game to be "delightfully intoxicating", unique, and intriguing, with the author replaying it multiple times. PC Gamer likewise responded positively, drawing particular attention to the game's changing soundtrack and the ways in which it coherently reacts to the player's movement.

=== Post-release ===
The PC version received "generally favorable" reviews according to the review aggregation website Metacritic. A Shacknews staff poll named the PC version the seventh-best game of 2013, calling it "delightfully devoid of explanation".

Reviewers praised the game's dynamic audio, commenting positively on how it accompanied them through the game. Patrick Hancock of Destructoid called the game's dynamic soundtrack its "biggest accomplishment", with Hancock investigating every object he saw to uncover its musical contribution. IGN wrote, "It's oddly captivating to just walk around and let [the sounds] wash over your surroundings", going on to say that investigating the sounds that each object and animal made was an enjoyable experience. PC Gamer described the audio as "a deeply satisfying emergent arrangement". A review in Edge⁣, however, though generally positive about the soundtrack, said that the music "never truly gets going", particularly because of the lack of drums in most seasons.

The game's variety and replay value received mixed reactions. IGN's reviewer commented positively on the replayability, finding that the game provided a deeper experience on each subsequent playthrough. GameSpot was less positive, writing that while some events and locations were not guaranteed on each generated island, later portions of the game were less interesting due to their familiarity. Likewise, PC Gamer said that towards the end of the game they began to find it aimless and unstimulating, in particular because of the sparsity of animal life.

The PlayStation Vita version received "generally favourable reviews", while the PlayStation 3 version received "mixed or average reviews", according to Metacritic. Pocket Gamer gave a positive review, praising the audio and the extra features present in the Vita version such as PlayStation Trophies, which provided a reason to replay the game. They noted, however, that the game had some performance issues, particularly when moving the camera. Metro's review described the game as a "fascinating interactive experience", particularly as a result of the music. PlayStation Official Magazine – UK called the PlayStation 3 version "simple but wonderfully effective", commenting positively on the game's uniqueness and sense of wonder.

Many players and journalists debated Proteus' status as a video game, citing aspects such as the lack of goals or objectives. Some, including the game's developers, called it an anti-game, a description which was controversial. Ian Bogost proposed that the game was intentionally unconventional, arguing that "Proteus is a game about being an island instead of a game about being on one". IGN noted that Proteus does contain an action (walking) and a goal (proceeding through the seasons). Edge's reviewer contended that the day/night cycle, changeable weather, and a player-triggered change of seasons qualified Proteus as a legitimate game. Key responded by pointing out that, while the product does include rudimentary game mechanics, interacting with them is optional and they do not usually provide feedback. However, Key also stated that "encouraging a strict definition of 'game' does nothing but foster conservatism and defensiveness".
