= Journeymen Butchers' Federation of Great Britain =

- Predecessor: Barnsley Journeymen Butchers' Union
- Merged into: National Union of Distributive and Allied Workers
- Founded: 1902
- Dissolved: February 1946
- Headquarters: 42 Wentworth Chambers, Pinstone Street, Sheffield
- Location: United Kingdom
- Members: 7,943 (1946)
- Key people: Joe Couldwell (Gen Sec)
- Affiliations: TUC

The Journeymen Butchers' Federation of Great Britain was a trade union representing workers in the meat trade in Britain.

The union was founded in 1902 by Joe Couldwell, bringing together the Barnsley Journeymen Butchers' Union, which had been founded earlier in the year, and a Sheffield-based union of butchers. Initially, the union was only a loose federation with a mere 75 members. The union became more centralised in 1907, and appointed Couldwell as its first general secretary. Duncan Carmichael founded a branch in London 1908, and by 1914 the union had fourteen branches around Great Britain. By 1916, the union was able to employ Couldwell on a full-time basis.

During World War I, the union began to gain recognition from the government for negotiation purposes, in particular working with the Smithfield Control Board. It had 153 branches by 1921, and membership peaked at 7,000 in 1922, including 500 women. The union then went into decline, bottoming out at only 3,000 members in 1928, the year that Couldwell died. It then began to grow once more, and by 1946 it had reached a new peak of 7,943 members. That year, it merged into the National Union of Distributive and Allied Workers.

== General Secretaries ==
1907: Joe Couldwell
1928: Ewart Beeley
