= National Videogame Museum (United Kingdom) =

Video game museum in Sheffield, England

- Established: 2018
- Location: Sheffield; England
- Coordinates: 53.383632°N 1.465708°W
- Public transit access: Castle Square
- Website: thenvm.org/

The National Videogame Museum is located in Sheffield, England and exhibits contemporary and historic video games.

== History ==
In 2015, the National Videogame Arcade opened in Nottingham, as the world's first cultural centre dedicated entirely to videogames.

The NVA moved to Castle House in Sheffield in 2018, and was renamed the National Videogame Museum.

In November 2023, the NVA celebrated its fifth birthday in which was its busiest year to date with over 50,000 visitors to the Castle House venue.

== Collection ==
The museum features playable exhibits including the following hardware:

- BBC Micro
- Super Nintendo Entertainment System
- Sega Megadrive
- Game Boy Advance
- Nintendo Switch
- PlayStation
- Xbox
- PC

The exhibited games include:

- Dancing Stage Fusion
- Duck Hunt
- Gunblade NY
- QWOP
- Rock Band
