= GameCity =

Independent organisation in Nottingham, UK

- GameCity Logo
- Status: Active
- Genre: Gaming
- Locations: Nottingham, England
- Country: UK
- Founded: 2006
- Website: http://www.gamecity.org

GameCity is an independent organisation based in Nottingham, UK, which has worked since 2006 with the support of Nottingham Trent University to bring videogames to the widest possible audiences. This has been done through an annual GameCity Festival, described as the "Sundance of the video games world", the GameCity Prize since 2011, and the National Videogame Arcade since 2015. Each year, GameCity hosts talks and presentations from individuals and companies working in the games industry.

== GameCity Festivals ==
The GameCity Festival has run annually in Nottingham since 2006.

Gamecity 3 was held over Halloween 2008. To coincide with this, GameCity arranged a successful world record attempt at the largest number of people to dress as zombies in one place. The record was set to 1227 people, although even more 'unregistered zombies' were present at the attempt. Also during the 2008 event, the National Videogame Archive for the UK was launched with the Save the Videogame campaign. This was led by the recording of the first public Director Commentary event, with Martin Hollis and David Doak playing Goldeneye 64 live.

GameCity Squared took place from 27 to 31 October 2009. Events in 2009 included: Brickstock (a LEGO Rock Band celebration); Elite: Paper Universe - which celebrated 25 years of Elite by bringing together David Braben, Ian Bell, Robert Holdstock and others involved in its creation; Crysis: LIVE - a large scale re-enactment of Crysis; and various industry talks from Jagex and Masaya Matsuura. The final location of the Keita Takahashi-designed playground was also revealed as being Woodthorpe Grange Park in Nottingham.

GameCity 7 took place in Nottingham from 20 to 27 October 2012. There were several events held over the 8 day festival, including keynotes from Leigh Alexander, Phil Fish, Adam Saltsman, Ed Stern and many more. The festival also had the first UK showing of the LEGO: Lord of the Rings game, demonstrated by LEGO's Creative Director Jonathan Smith. A World Record was broken on the final day of the festival, as GameCity attempted to host the World's Largest Practical Science experiment. 292 people participated in the event, succeeding the previous record of 276.

=== GameCity Prize ===
The GameCity Prize was announced on 15 September 2011. As part of the annual GameCity Festival it is awarded for a game's "accomplishments and contribution to popular culture". Minecraft won the first GameCity Prize in 2011.

== National Videogame Arcade ==
In March 2015, GameCity opened the UK's first permanent cultural centre for videogames. Located in the centre of Nottingham, the National Videogame Arcade is "a place where the whole family can discover videogames, play videogames and make videogames". Spread across five floors, the NVA has three floors of playable galleries showcasing games both old and new, and exploring videogame culture through unique interactive exhibits. Alongside this, the NVA further features a floor dedicated to education and the National Curriculum, allowing students a hands-on experience of game-making through a variety of workshops.

In 2016, the NVA in Nottingham fell into cash flow difficulties. An eleventh hour investment by a director-led consortium, led by director Iain Simons, saved all 40 jobs. The destination was being taken into administration in August 2016.

In 2018, the NVA closed down in Nottingham. The same team has since launched the UK National Videogame Museum in Sheffield.
