= Spaceteam =

2012 video game

- Developer: Sleeping Beast Games
- Platforms: iOS, Android
- Release: iOS, Android: NA: December 1, 2012; Apple TV: NA: November 4, 2015
- Mode: Multiplayer

Spaceteam is a free-to-play local cooperative multiplayer video game developed and published by Henry Smith of Canadian studio Sleeping Beast Games for iOS, Android, and tvOS operating systems. It was released on December 1, 2012 and is described as a "cooperative shouting game for phones and tablets". The game uses multiple smartphone or tablet devices, connected via wifi or bluetooth, to enter a shared game of two to eight players.

== Gameplay ==
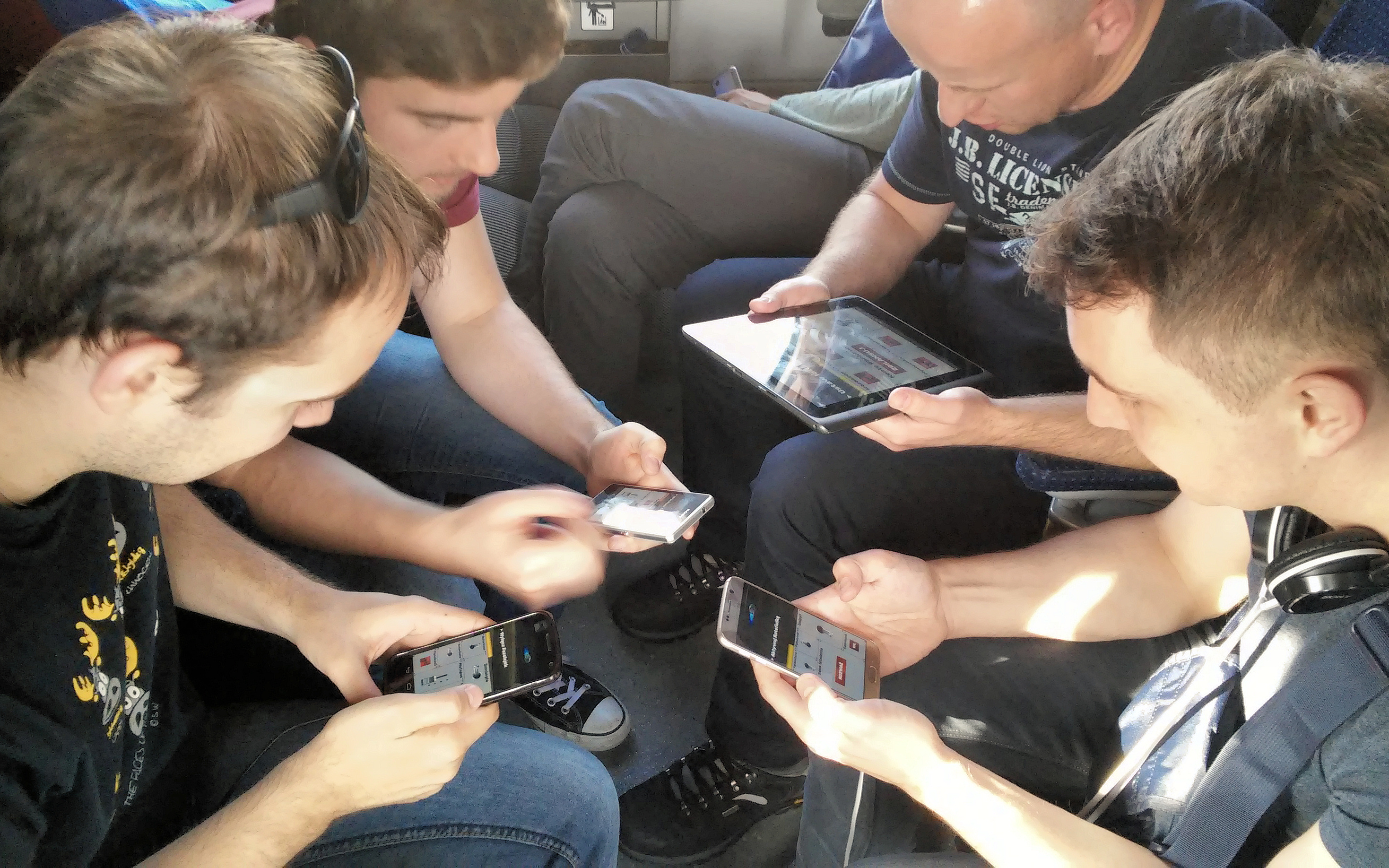
Four people playing Spaceteam together

Each player is responsible for a different spaceship control panel on their individual device's screen, with various knobs and dials labelled with a variety of technobabble. The players perform individual functions as members of the ship's crew, with the goal of keeping the vessel from crashing. As the game begins, differing orders are given to each player via their device as a task to pilot the ship. The player must then verbally tell the group the order that needs to be accomplished until the person with the relevant control panel activates the order correctly. Simultaneously, the player must listen for any orders that are relevant to their control panel and activate them accordingly.

Upon correctly applying multiple orders from all players, the ship enters warp, and the group of players continues to the next stage of increasingly difficult gameplay. "The tasks get harder. Sometimes you may find your instruments mislabeled, for example." If mistakes are made, damage will occur to the ship in the form of different players control panels breaking, and if too many mistakes are made, the group's ship is consumed by a supernova and the game ends. "There also are events that require everyone to do something three-dimensional with their phones. If you hit a wormhole, you have to tip your devices upside down. To avoid asteroids, you have to all shake your devices, ideally without flinging them across the room."

The hectic gameplay makes most players inevitably begin shouting their orders. Smith suggests this was not an intended feature. "People start shouting because it's the only way to getting someone to hear your instruction. In harder levels, you basically have to talk over each other otherwise the timer runs out too quickly ... it's just what you do in that situation – all hell's breaking loose, and you're trying to get people to hear your instructions."

== Development ==
Henry Smith, who had worked on a failed Irrational Games project as well as Dead Space 2 with Electronic Arts, left his job at BioWare in 2012 to pursue his own work. He began Spaceteam as an experiment in order to learn how to code for iOS and Android devices inspired by science fiction culture, including Doctor Who, Red Dwarf and The Hitchhiker's Guide to the Galaxy. Smith stated that his biggest inspiration came from the co-op board game Space Alert.

Smith has stated that the user interface (UI) and icon design is "supposed to be stylized letters 'S' and 'T' joined together. As a bonus, the negative space between them is in the shape of a lever." In addition, the connection flow was to be made as simple as possible, which includes: no host or join, server lists, IP addresses or system dialogs. Smith used a variety of programs and tools to build the game. For example, Cocos2d and extensions for the core engine and CocoaAsyncSocket and HHServices for networking.

== Reception ==
Reception

Aggregate score
Aggregator	Score
Metacritic	91/100

Review score
Publication	Score
TouchArcade	5/5

Spaceteam has been met with resounding critical success. It received lavish praise from GameSpot, Kotaku, The Verge, Polygon, and many other video game news and critical outlets. It also won numerous awards and recognition, and has received over three million downloads across the Apple store and Google Play store as of Nov 11, 2015. Despite the popularity of the game and the offerings of in-game purchases available to enhance the gameplay, the game has only made a total of $49,700 directly as of Nov 11, 2015, and $25,000 tangentially through prize money. Smith insists that making money from Spaceteam was never his original design, but comments that the game is finally nearing profitability.

=== Spin-off board game ===
Given the mobile game's popularity, "in late 2014, Henry teamed up with Tommy West and Matt Sisson to create a table top version of Spaceteam. Throughout 2015, the team experimented on and off with different concepts, from complex board games to strategy based card and token games...". In addition, the co-creator, Elan Lee, of Exploding Kittens is helping test and produce the cards. On September 23, 2015 a Kickstarter campaign was made to produce a party-style card game while staying true to the original mobile version. As of 2016, there have been approximately 4,220 backers that have pledged a total of $181,600 exceeding their goal of $7,500.

The gameplay of the game is similar to the original. The maximum number of players are from 3 to 6 with playing time being 5 minutes. "Your goal is to ensure that all ship systems are functioning properly before time runs out. Each player must deal with the various malfunctions in their sector by flipping cards from the malfunction deck in front of them, and fixing the ship's systems." "As the cards are drawn from the malfunction stack, players will have to work together to apply the correct tools to the malfunctions that pop up. Each tool is unique however, and players must communicate at the table to pass the right tool to the right player." "There are no turns; everyone plays and shouts at the same time. Victory is achieved if enough malfunctions are corrected to reveal the 6 hidden System-Go Cards before time is up".

== Awards ==
Award	Date	Category	Result	Ref.
Game City Prize 2013's Best Game of 2013	January 30, 2013	Winner 2013	Won	
IndieCade Interaction Award	October 6, 2013	Interaction Award	Won	
A MAZE Indie Connect Festival's Winner 2013	April 26, 2013	Winner	Won	
10th Annual International Mobile Gaming Awards	June 6, 2011	Excellence in Innovation	Won	
Independent Games Festival 2013	March 17, 2013	Nuovo	Nominated	
PAX East Indie Showcase 2013	March 17, 2013	Showcase	Nominated	
