= General Workers Party of Hungary =

Political party (1880–1890)

General Workers Party of Hungary Magyarországi Általános Munkáspárt
- Abbreviation: MÁMP
- Leader: Leó Frankel; Antal Ihrlinger
- Founded: 1880
- Dissolved: 12 December 1890
- Merged into: Hungarian Labour Party; Non-Voters Party
- Succeeded by: Social Democratic Party of Hungary
- Newspaper: Népszava; Arbeiter-Wochen-Chronik
- Ideology: Socialism
- Political position: Left-wing
- International affiliation: Second International

The General Workers Party of Hungary (Hungarian: Magyarországi Általános Munkáspárt, MÁMP) was a socialist political party in Hungary 1880-1890. The party was led by Leo Frankel. The party was formed through the merger of two parties, the Hungarian Labour Party and the Non-Voters Party. The Ministry of Interior had forbidden the party of using the name 'Social Democratic Party', since the term was seen to have revolutionary connotations.

The main organs of the party was Népszava (People's Voice) and the German language edition Arbeiter-Wochen-Chronik.

The ideological line was largely based on the Gotha Programme, but with some differences. After Frankel's arrest in 1881, the party came under control of more moderate elements, which moved away from the ideas of class struggle and proletarian internationalism.

In 1889 the party took part in the founding of the Second International. In 1890 it founded a new party, the Social Democratic Party of Hungary.
