= J. F. Hodgson =

Left-wing activist

John Frederick Hodgson (10 April 1867 – 1947) was a British socialist activist.

Born in York, Hodgson trained as a tailor, becoming a foreman cutter in clothing wholesale. He moved to Reading in the 1890s, joining the Social Democratic Federation, and then its successor, the British Socialist Party. He was part of the majority in the party which opposed World War I, and in 1918, he was elected to its executive.

The BSP affiliated to the Labour Party and Hodgson was unsuccessfully nominated for the party's National Executive Committee. He also became its Prospective Parliamentary Candidate for Islington East, though he did not ultimately stand.

In 1920, the BSP became the main constituent of the new Communist Party of Great Britain. Hodgson was part of the Joint Provisional Committee which organised the formation, and he then served as the party's first treasurer, and as a member of the executive. He also attended the Conference of the Amsterdam Bureau in 1920.

Hodgson married, had two children, and was widowed early in life. In 1898, he met Anne Holton, and the two began living together, although they did not marry. The two separated in 1921 after Hodgson began an affair, and he was fined £200 for breach of promise. This led him to leave the CPGB in 1922, change his name to Edwin Player, and become the manager of a clothing company.
