= Leó Frankel =

Hungarian communist revolutionary (1844–1896)

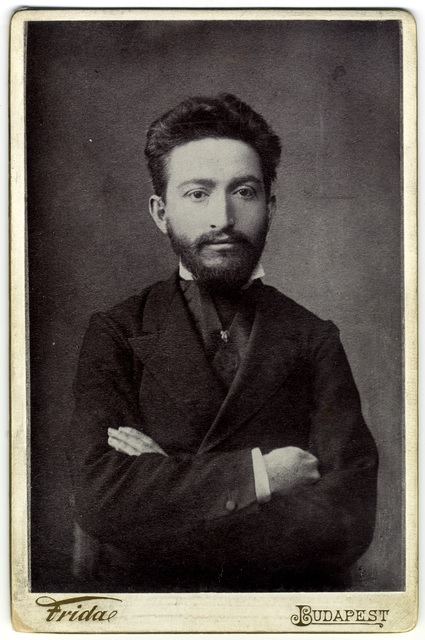
Leó Frankel, c. 1876.

Leo Fränkel (25 February 1844, Altofen-Neustift, Austro-Hungarian Empire – 29 March 1896, Paris) was a socialist revolutionary, labour leader of Jewish descent. In France where he participated in the Paris Commune of 1871 as a member of the First International, also known as the International Workingmen's Association. After his return to Paris in 1889, he was known as Léo Frankel.

== Life ==
Fränkel was born in 1844, in Újlak (now part of Budapest, Hungary but at the time known in German, the ruling language of the Austrian [after 1867: Austro-Hungarian] Empire, as Altofen-Neustift). As Jewish subjects of the empire, Fränkel and his family likely spoke German, hence the spelling of his name here. Trained as a goldsmith, Fränkel first went to work in Germany in 1861, where he became involved with Ferdinand Lassalle's Allgemeiner Deutscher Arbeiterverein sometime between 1865 and 1866. In 1867, he was appointed as the Paris correspondent for the Sozialdemokraten, a Lassallist journal published in Switzerland.

In Paris he participated in the work of the First International, organizing German, Hungarian and other foreign workers within the city. He was arrested in January 1870 for his political activity and being a member of the International. Freed from prison after the declaration of the Third Republic on 4 September 1870 during the Prussian siege of Paris, he, along with other Internationalists, was highly critical of the French Government of National Defense's efforts to oppose the Prussians. After the French government's surrender to the Prussians on 28 January 1871, the National Guards in charge of the defense of Paris, including Fränkel among their members, refused to surrender their arms to the Prussians or the Government of National Defense. This refusal, in collaboration with radical members of the government of Paris, led to a confrontation on 18 March 1871, and to the declaration of an independent Paris Commune.

On 26 March 1871, the Central Committee of the National Guard and the Revolutionary Socialist Party held elections. Fränkel was elected as a member of the Paris Commune, which he served as the delegate responsible for labor, industry, and trade, regulating hours of work, and the organization of workers' cooperatives. Upon the defeat of the Commune, wounded in its defence, the revolutionary escaped the impending death sentence to Switzerland, along with Elisabeth Dmitrieff, who had founded and run the Union of Women during the Commune.

Later in 1871 he settled in London, where he joined the leadership of the First International, founded by Karl Marx and others in 1864. He was elected to serve as First Internationale representative for the Austro-Hungarian Empire. He worked closely with Marx and Engels and was a regular guest at the Marx home. In September 1872, he was tried in absentia and sentenced to death in France but, according to the memoirs, Denkwürdigkeiten, of fellow-exile Wilhelm Blos, the British government refused to allow Fränkel's extradition to France.

Fränkel returned to Budapest in 1876, where he edited the German/ Hungarian bilingual paper Arbeiter Wochen-Chronik and founded the Hungarian General Labour Party (1880). He also supported the international congress of socialist parties (French, German, Belgian and Swiss) that met in Chur, Switzerland, which would lead to the foundation of the Second International but was tried and sent to prison for a year and a half for the infringement of the prevailing press law in 1881. Upon his release, Fränkel married the Frenchwoman Adèle Perriaud. They emigrated to Vienna in 1884 where Fränkel wrote for several papers in different languages, such as Népszava in Budapest, Die Gleichheit, Stuttgart, Volksstimme und Arbeiter-Zeitung in Vienna. In 1889 he took part in the congress of the Second International in Paris and settled in France once again.

He died in Paris in 1896. He was buried wrapped in the red flag of the Commune in the north-east section of Père Lachaise Cemetery in Paris, where many other Communards are buried and where an obelisk was erected in his honor. In 1968, his remains were interred in the Budapest cemetery Kerepesi temető, also known as the Fiume Road Cemetery.

== Honors ==
Hungary issued a commemorative postage stamp on 20 May 1951 on the 80th anniversary of Paris Commune.

== See also ==
- fr:Commune de Paris (1871) : Élus
