= Will Hewlett =

British trade unionist and socialist activist (1876-1921)

William James Hewlett (1876 – 1921) was a British trade unionist and socialist activist.

Born in Abertillery, Hewlett was a coal miner who joined the South Wales Miners' Federation. He became interested in syndicalism, and during the Cambrian Combine dispute of 1911, he teamed with Noah Ablett, Will Hay and Bill Mainwaring to form the Unofficial Reform Committee. He also worked on The Miners' Next Step pamphlet.

Hewlett next joined the Socialist Labour Party, and the South Wales Socialist Society (SWSS) which was aligned with it. He championed independent working class education, becoming secretary of the Workers' Democratic Education League and then the Central Labour College League.

Hewlett was a supporter of the October Revolution, and he believed that British communists should form a single, national, communist party. This led him to join the Communist Unity Group of the SLP. He also led the reformation of the SWSS as the "South Wales Communist Council", and then participated in the formation of the Communist Party of Great Britain, serving on its provisional executive committee. He consistently argued that the new party should not seek to affiliate to the Labour Party.

Hewlett attended the third congress of the Comintern in 1921, and the subsequent congress at which Red International of Labour Unions was founded. He went on a visit to coal miners in Tula, but died in an accident on an experimental high-speed railcar during the trip. Tom Bell argued that the train may have been sabotaged, but there is no evidence of this. Hewlett, and the other victims, lay in state in the Great Hall of Columns, and he was then buried near the Kremlin Wall.
