= Theodore Rothstein =

Soviet journalist, author, and diplomat (1871–1953)

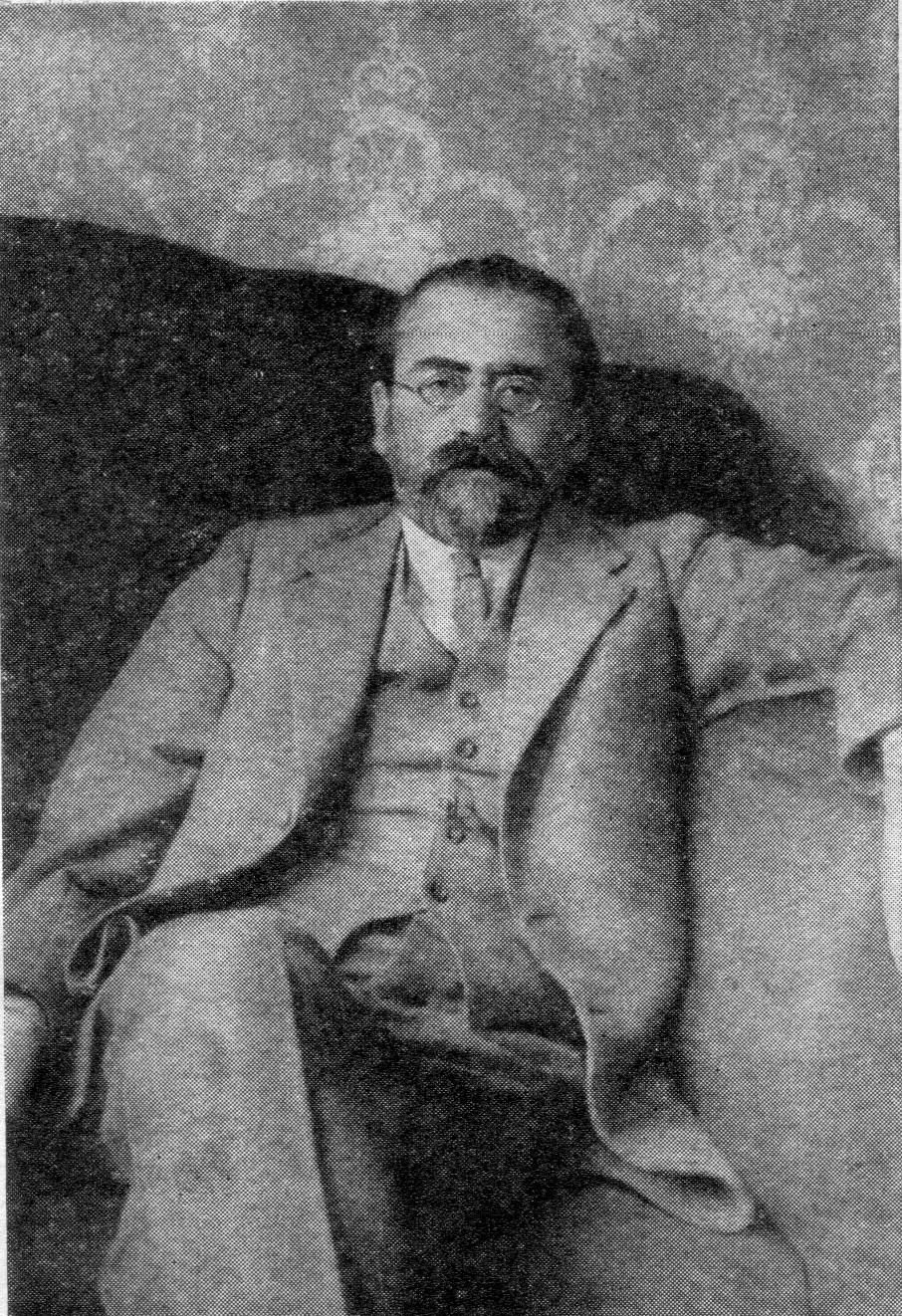
Theodore Rothstein.

Theodore Rothstein (Russian: Фёдор Аронович Ротштейн, Fyodor Aronovich Rotshteyn; 26 February 1871 – 30 August 1953) was a Russian-born journalist, author, and communist activist who spent his younger decades living in the UK. After the October Revolution, he emigrated to the Soviet Union and became an ambassador for that country.

== Biography ==
Theodore Rothstein was born in 1871 in the Imperial Russian city of Kovno, Kovno Governorate (present-day Kaunas, Lithuania), into a Jewish family.

=== Journalist and activist ===
Rothstein left Russia in 1890 for political reasons and settled in the United Kingdom. He worked as a journalist in the area of foreign policy for the Tribune, The Daily News, The Manchester Guardian, and was a member of the National Union of Journalists. He was also a London correspondent for several radical Russian-language newspapers. Rothstein wrote articles for the journal Die Neue Zeit—the organ of the Social Democratic Party of Germany (SPD)—that sought to present a consistent Marxism and participated in debates over theoretical questions within the Marxist left.

In 1895, Rothstein joined the Social Democratic Federation (SDF), which had been founded by Henry Hyndman in 1884. Rothstein occupied the left wing of the SDF and in 1900 was elected to its executive. He also joined the Russian Social Democratic Labour Party as a British member in 1901, and sided with the Bolshevik faction against the Mensheviks. He became a close comrade of Lenin, who often stayed at Rothstein's house on Clapton Square in the Hackney area of London.

In 1910, Rothstein authored Egypt's Ruin. It argued that Egypt was being exploited under British rule. He bolstered his argument with British government documents and correspondent reports from London newspapers. Although Rothstein was a vocal opponent of World War I, he worked for the Foreign Office and the War Office as a Russian translator and interpreter. Within the SDF's successor, the British Socialist Party (BSP), he led the opposition to Hyndman's support for the war.

After Hyndman and his faction left the BSP, Rothstein made numerous contributions to the BSP publication, The Call. His advocacy ensured that the BSP played a significant role in the formation of the Communist Party of Great Britain.

=== Soviet Ambassador to Iran ===
In 1920, following a visit to Moscow, Rothstein was refused permission to return to Great Britain. He remained in the Soviet Union, joined the Bolshevik Party, and took on the chairmanship of the "University reform commission" (1920–1921).

On 6 January 1921, Rothstein was accredited as the first Soviet Ambassador to Tehran. He departed for the posting on 6 February after having had conferred with Lenin. Rothstein took with him a large entourage of 150 people.

=== Later years ===
Beginning in 1922, Rothstein was a member of the "Collegium of the People's Commissariat for Foreign Affairs". He was appointed director of the Institute of World Economy and Politics in Moscow.

Rothstein's son Andrew stayed in Britain and also became a prominent communist.

Theodore Rothstein died in Moscow in August 1953.

== Works ==
- The Decline of British Industry, 1903.
- The Russian Revolution, 1907.
- Egypt's Ruin: A Financial and Administrative Record, London, 1910.
- Essays in the History of the British Labour Movement.
- From Chartism to Labourism - Historical Sketches of the English Working Class Movement, Dorrot Press Ltd., London, 1929.

== Sources ==
- Theodore Rothstein biography at the Marxists Internet Archive
- "Rothstein Andrew (and Theodore Rothstein)" - Profile of Theodore and his son in Graham Stevenson's Compendium of Communist Biographies
