= Fred Shaw (socialist activist) =

British socialist activist and trade unionist

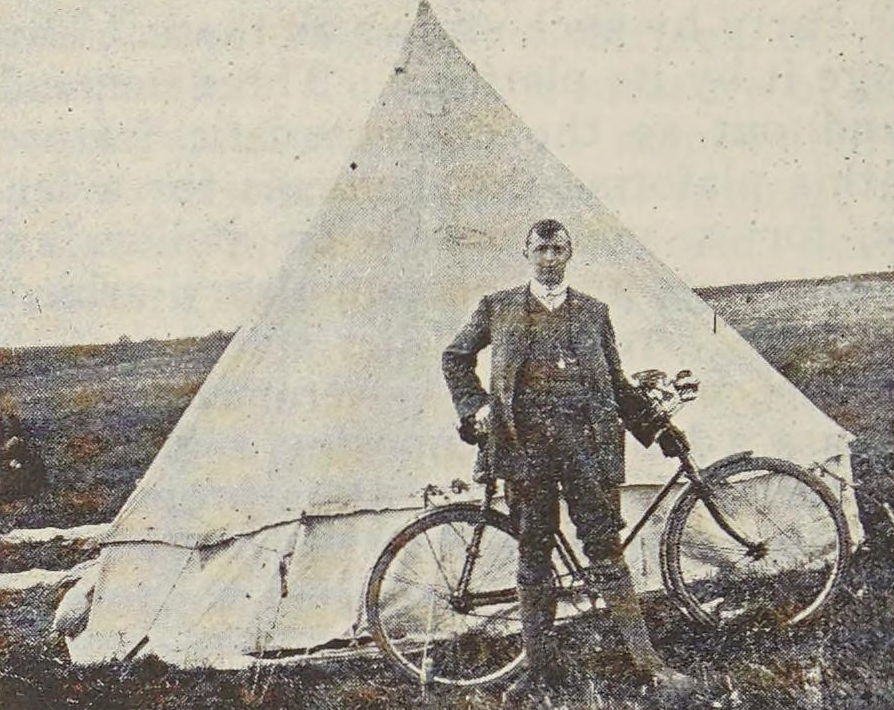
Shaw c. August 1910

Fred Shaw (25 May 1881 – 22 January 1951) was a British socialist activist and trade unionist.

== Early life ==
Born in Lindley, Shaw attended elementary school before working at the Wellington Mills as a blacksmiths' assistant. He gradually became a socialist.

== Organiser ==
By 1903 he was active in the Lindley Labour Representation Committee, and in 1905, he was a founder of the Huddersfield Socialist Labour Party. He became the first British agent for Charles H. Kerr & Co.'s socialist books and gradually became a popular speaker.

In 1912, Shaw was elected as secretary of his branch of the Amalgamated Society of Engineers and he had by this point joined the British Socialist Party (BSP), speaking on both their behalf and for the Independent Labour Party (ILP). Opposed to World War I, he was elected to the executive of the BSP in 1916, and at the 1918 general election, he stood for the party in Greenock, taking around 2,500 votes but not coming close to election. His employer fired him for taking time off to campaign, but he was reinstated following a strike, only to be fired again in 1921.

Shaw attended the 1920 Unity Convention that founded the Communist Party of Great Britain (CPGB) and sat on its first executive. In addition to trade union activity, he was prominent in the Hands Off Russia campaign, and served as president of Huddersfield Trades Council for much of the 1920s.

In 1919, he was elected to Huddersfield Town Council, serving for four years. By this point, he had been blacklisted by employers in his area and had various short-term jobs before he found regular work with the National Council of Labour Colleges. In 1923, he left the CPGB and joined the Labour Party, also joining the ILP. He filled various labour movement posts until his retirement in 1946, dying five years later.

Party political offices
| Preceded by Sam Farrow | President of the British Socialist Party; 1918 | Succeeded by Alf Barton |
