= Dora Montefiore =

English-Australian women's suffragist and writer (1851–1933)

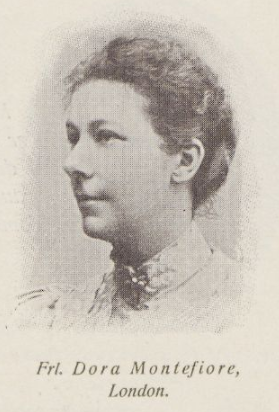
- Dora Montefiore, c. 1904
- Born: Dorothy Frances Fuller; 20 December 1851; Kenley, Surrey, England, United Kingdom of Great Britain and Ireland
- Died: 21 December 1933 (aged 82); Hastings, England, United Kingdom
- Occupations: Writer, suffragette
- Employer: International Socialist Review of Australasia
- Organization(s): Womanhood Suffrage League of New South Wales; National Union of Women's Suffrage Societies; Women's Social and Political Union; Women's Tax Resistance League; Women's Freedom League; Adult Suffrage Society
- Political party: British Socialist Party; Communist Party of Great Britain; Communist Party of Australia
- Spouse: George Barrow Montefiore
- Children: 2

Dorothy Frances Montefiore (née Fuller; 20 December 1851 – 21 December 1933), known as Dora Montefiore, was an English-Australian women's suffragist, socialist, tax resister, poet, translator and autobiographer active in Britain.

== Early life ==
Born Dorothy Frances Fuller at Kenley Manor near Coulsdon, Surrey, daughter of Francis Fuller and Mary Ann Fuller (née Drew). Montefiore's father was involved with railway engineering and was a driving force behind the Great Exhibition in 1851. Her mother was a daughter of George Drew, a property speculator who developed Caterham. Dora was educated by governesses and tutors and at Mrs Creswell's school at Brighton. In 1874, Dora went to Sydney to assist her brother's wife. Dora returned briefly to England, and on her return to Sydney married Jewish merchant George Barrow Montefiore, son of Joseph Barrow Montefiore. They had two children.

In 1889, her husband was lost at sea. When Montefiore learned that she had no automatic right to guardianship of her children, she became an advocate of women's rights. The first meeting of the Womanhood Suffrage League of New South Wales was held at Montefiore's home on 29 March 1891. In 1892 Montefiore left Australia and after spending several years in Paris, settled in England.

== Suffragette ==
An influence on her socialist views was from time with Julia Dawson, on the Clarion Van in the West Midlands and she continued to see the need for women to be given the right to vote, as a class issue.

In 1898, Montefiore produced a book of verse Singings Through the Dark. She also continued to be active in the suffrage movement, serving on the executive of Millicent Fawcett's National Union of Women's Suffrage Societies (NUWSS) and she joined the Women's Social and Political Union (WSPU) that had been formed by Emmeline and Christabel Pankhurst. In 1897, Montefiore proposed the formation of the Women's Tax Resistance League (WTRL). In 1906, to protest lack of political representation, Montefiore refused to pay her taxes and remained barricaded in her home for six weeks. The League used this occasion as an opportunity for demonstrations and publicity:

The house, surrounded by a wall, could be reached only through an arched doorway, which Montefiore and her maid barred against the bailiffs. For six weeks, Montefiore resisted payment of her taxes, addressing the frequent crowds through the upper windows of the house.

Her house had a banner displayed saying: “Women should vote for the laws they obey and the taxes they pay.” Montefiore said "I was doing this because the mass of non-qualified women could not demonstrate in the same way, and I was to that extent their spokeswoman. It was the crude fact of women's political disability that had to be forced on an ignorant and indifferent public." In October of the same year, Adela Pankhurst, Montefiore and others were arrested for demanding votes for women in the lobby of the House of Commons. Montefiore later described the experience and the interior of Holloway Prison. Montefiore also joined several socialist organisations around this time, including the Women's Freedom League (WFL), the Social Democratic Federation and the British Socialist Party. Montefiore was also a linguist and responsible for the first English translation of the work of Maxim Gorky.

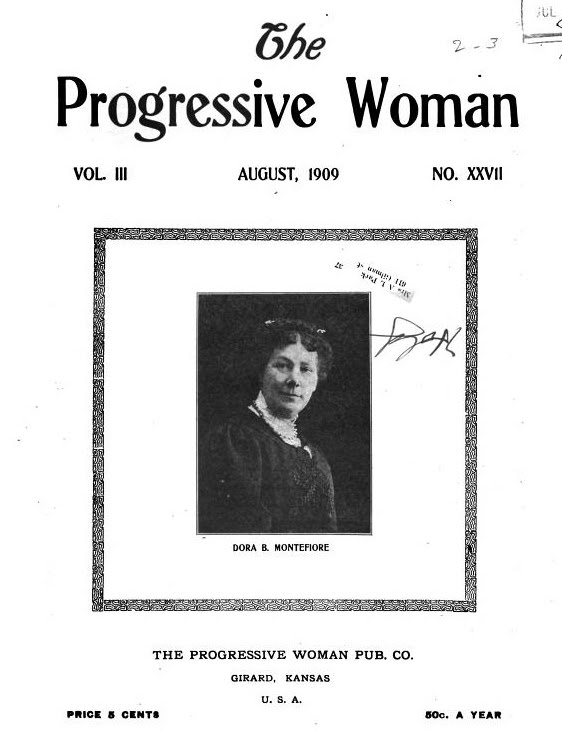
Montefiore on the cover of The Progressive Woman magazine, August 1909

Montefiore was friends with suffragettes Adelaide Knight and Minnie Baldock. Montefiore was one of the speaker's at Baldock's Canning Town WSPU group and wrote to support Baldock's 'noble stand' in visiting the Liberal leader in December 1906. Montefiore left the WSPU and joined the Adult Suffrage Society, for which she was elected as honorary secretary in 1909, to support the case for full suffrage not based on financial status but for all men and women over the age of majority (21), rather than the limited option, some argued as a first step of women with property being enfranchised. Montefiore's socialist views were shared by Sylvia Pankhurst whom she kept in contact with after the split with WSPU.

== Later life ==
Montefiore lectured in Holland, attended the Socialist International Conference and went on a lecture tour of Europe and in the US, then returned to Australia in 1910 to visit her son Gilbert. While in Australia, Montefiore edited International Socialist Review of Australasia when its owner Henry Holland fell ill in 1911. Montefiore also met Premier William Arthur Holman. In 1912 Montefiore went to South Africa and wrote about the effect of capitalism.

In October 1913, Montefiore was involved in a “holiday plan” to take the children of unionised workers locked out by employers in Dublin into the respite care of sympathetic families in England. Archbishop of Dublin William Joseph Walsh, wrote a public letter condemning the plan as dangerous to the children's Catholic faith. Those involved were arrested and charged with kidnapping. The charges were later dropped.

During World War I, Montefiore volunteered in France but also joined the British Socialist Party, and contributed articles to The Call. In 1920, she was elected to the provisional council of its successor, the Communist Party of Great Britain. When Montefiore's son died in 1921 from the effects of mustard gas poisoning acquired during his service in the War, the Australian government would not allow her to visit Australia until Holman spoke on her behalf and assured them that she promised not to engage in communist propaganda. Montefiore was allowed to visit, and also used the time to make connections in the Australian communist movement, meeting Christian Jollie Smith. Montefiore represented the Communist Party of Australia in Moscow in 1924.

Montefiore wrote her autobiography in 1927; it was called From a Victorian to a Modern.

Montefiore died at home in Hastings in 1933, and her cremation was at Golders Green, Middlesex.

== Posthumous recognition ==
Her name and picture (and those of 58 other women's suffrage supporters) are on the plinth of the statue of Millicent Fawcett in Parliament Square, London, unveiled in 2018.

== See also ==
- History of feminism
- List of suffragists and suffragettes
- Suffragette
- Women's suffrage in the United Kingdom
