= Albert Inkpin =

British communist politician (1884–1944)

Comrade Albert Inkpin

1st General Secretary of the Communist Party of Great Britain
- In office 31 July 1920 – July 1928
- Chair: Arthur MacManus
- Preceded by: Position established
- Succeeded by: J. R. Campbell

Personal details
- Born: Albert Samuel Inkpin; 16 June 1884 Haggerston, London, United Kingdom
- Died: 29 March 1944 (aged 59)
- Cause of death: Cancer
- Spouse: Julia Raven (m. 1910)
- Children: 3
- Education: St Paul’s School, Hackney

Albert Samuel Inkpin, (also written Inkpen) (16 June 1884 – 29 March 1944) was a British communist and the first General Secretary of the Communist Party of Great Britain (CPGB). Originally employed as a clerk, Inkpin joined the Social Democratic Federation (SDF) in 1904 and maintained his role as it evolved into the British Socialist Party (BSP). Following successful efforts to unite socialists groups including the BSP, Inkpin became the first General Secretary of the CPGB.

While leader of the CPGB, he served several terms in prison for political offences. In 1929 he was replaced as head of the CPGB and made head of the party's Friends of Soviet Russia organisation, a position he retained until his death in 1944.

== Early life ==
Albert Inkpin was born on 16 June 1884 in Haggerston, London. His family were members of the Church of England. His father was a cabinet-maker, and his mother planned that he would attend theological college. Inkpin's brother, Harry, also went on to become a communist and, at the fourth congress of the Communist Party of Great Britain, was charged with applying the organisational theses of the Communist International to the British context alongside Harry Pollitt and Rajani Palme Dutt.

== Career ==
At the insistence of his mother, Inkpin became a clerk. He joined the National Union of Clerks, becoming its assistant secretary in 1907. In 1904, at the age of 20, he joined the Marxist Social Democratic Federation (SDF), and became one of its Assistant Secretaries in 1907. He followed the SDF into the new British Socialist Party (BSP) in 1911, continuing to serve as an Assistant Secretary.

In 1913 Inkpin was elected General Secretary of the BSP. He was a committed internationalist and anti-militarist, an opponent of World War I, and a delegate to the Zimmerwald Conference. This placed him at odds with former SDF leader H. M. Hyndman's support of British participation in the conflict. This tension between the Left and Right the BSP ended in 1916 with Hyndman and his co-thinkers departing the group. Inkpin assumed editorship of the BSP's weekly newspaper, The Call, at this time. Inkpin's application in 1917 as a conscientious objector for exemption from military service was rejected by the Hornsey military service tribunal and the Middlesex Appeal Tribunal, but he was temporarily exempted as he was a leading figure in a political party and, ultimately, he did not serve.

Inkpin and the more radical elements were in a position of firm control of the BSP organisation after 1916. He represented the BSP at the foundation of the Hands Off Russia movement in 1919. He supported the unity discussions which led to the formation of the Communist Party of Great Britain in 1920.

=== Communist leader ===
Inkpin was Secretary of the Joint Provisional Committee of the Communist Party, the group of representatives of member organisations who set the agenda for the founding congress. This convention was held in London over the weekend 31 July to 1 August 1920 and was attended by 160 delegates, presenting 211 mandates. These delegates included Inkpin's wife, Julia, and brother, Harry. Inkpin delivered the keynote address to the gathering and was elected to the governing Central Committee of the new political organisation, becoming General Secretary.

Inkpin was named a member of the honorary presidium of the 3rd World Congress of the Communist International, held in Moscow during the summer of 1921. He returned from Soviet Russia to face more legal difficulties with British authorities. He was charged and convicted for printing and circulating Communist literature, serving a six-month term from January to June 1922. While in prison Inkpin stood as a candidate for London County Council. Inkpin emerged from jail to become the CPGB's National Organiser, but reverted to being General Secretary the following year.

In 1925 Inkpin was again imprisoned, this time as one of 12 prominent Communists charged under the Incitement to Mutiny Act 1797. He was sentenced to six months in prison and remained imprisoned until just prior to the eruption of the British General Strike of May 1926.

Inkpin stood down as General Secretary in 1929, to be replaced by Harry Pollitt, following his opposition to the "class against class" policy, and criticism of his leadership from internal opponents and the Comintern. He was dropped from the party's secretariat, and sent to Birmingham as an organiser. While the Comintern sought to end his employment, Pollitt made the case for retaining Inkpin, in particular because of his knowledge of the party's secrets. Early in 1930, he was appointed as secretary of the CPGB offshoot, the Friends of the Soviet Union, based in Berlin, then from 1933 in Amsterdam. Historians John McIlroy and Alan Campbell described this as an exile. Inkpin’s correspondences from this period reveal it to be a troubling time that brought stress to his family. Inkpin remained loyal to the Soviet Union, and during the early stages of World War II became a popular speaker on the possibility of British-Soviet collaboration.

== Personal life and death ==
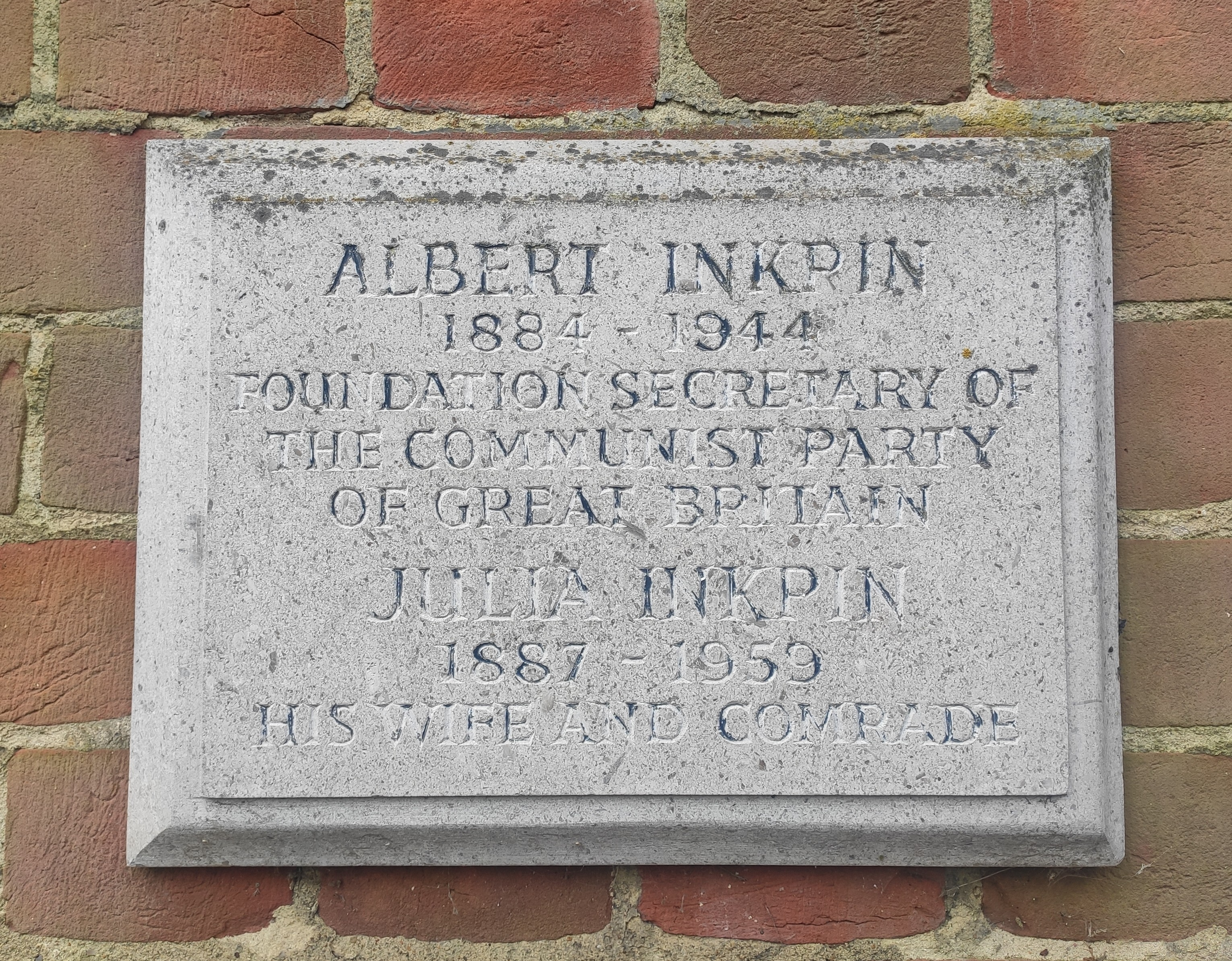
Plaque dedicated to Inkpin and his wife at Golders Green Crematorium

In 1910, Inkpin married Julia Raven, the daughter of Russian parents, who was employed by the Black Sea Shipping Company and Baltic Steamship Company. She was a member of the CPGB until her death in 1957. They had three children together: their son, Arthur, was a member of the Young Communist League employed by Russian Oil Products, and their daughters, Jean and Kathleen, both briefly worked for the Friends of the Soviet Union.

In September 1942, Inkpin became ill with cancer, and although he continued working and remained secretary of the British offshoot of the Friends of the Soviet Union, the Russia Today Society, he did not recover, and died in his home in on 29 March 1944. He was cremated at Golders Green Crematorium.

== Publications by Albert Inkpin ==
- "Re-Establishing" the Second International: The Communist Party of Great Britain Replies to a Letter of Appeal Signed by Arthur Henderson (for the British Labour Party), J.H. Thomas and Harry Gosling (for the Trades Union Congress), and J. Ramsay MacDonald (for the Second International). London: Communist Party of Great Britain, n.d. [c. 1921].
- The Glory of Stalingrad. London: Russia Today Society, 1942.
- Friends of the USSR: The Story of the Russia Today Society. London: Russia Today Society, n.d. [1942].

== Footnotes ==
Party political offices
Preceded by Henry W. Lee	General Secretary of the British Socialist Party; 1913–1920	Succeeded by Position abolished
Preceded by Position established	General Secretary of the Communist Party of Great Britain; 1920–1928	Succeeded by J.R. Campbell
Preceded by Bob Stewart	National Organiser of the Communist Party of Great Britain; 1922–1923	Succeeded by N/A
