= British Socialist Party =

- Abbreviation: BSP
- Founded: 30 September 1911
- Dissolved: 31 July 1920
- Preceded by: Social Democratic Federation
- Succeeded by: CPGB; NSP (split); SNDC (split)
- Newspaper: Justice; The Call
- Youth wing: Young Socialist League
- Ideology: Marxism; Socialism; Internationalists: Internationalism; Defencists (until 1916:); British nationalism After 1918: Communism; Revolutionary socialism
- Political position: Left-wing After 1918: Far-left

The British Socialist Party (BSP) was a Marxist political organisation established in Great Britain in 1911. Following a protracted period of factional struggle, in 1916 the party's anti-war forces gained decisive control of the party and saw the defection of its pro-war right wing. After the victory of the Bolshevik Revolution in Russia at the end of 1917 and the termination of the First World War the following year, the BSP emerged as an explicitly revolutionary socialist organisation. It negotiated with other radical groups in an effort to establish a unified communist organisation, an effort which culminated in August 1920 with the establishment of the Communist Party of Great Britain. The youth organisation the Young Socialist League was affiliated with the party.

== Organizational history ==
=== Formative period (1911–1914) ===
The founding conference which established the British Socialist Party was called by the Social Democratic Party (SDP), a group best remembered to history by its pre-1908 moniker, the Social Democratic Federation (SDF). The old SDF had long sought the unity of the British Left, having originally begun negotiations on the topic with the Independent Labour Party (ILP) not long after the formation of the latter in 1893. The ILP had long been unwilling to merge forces with a doctrinaire Marxist organization such as the SDF, however, and unity negotiations had reached an impasse. Finally, as the decade of the 1910s dawned, there seemed to be some interest in the topic among the rank and file of the ILP, and the 1910 Annual Conference of the SDF/SDP had decided to try again in earnest.

The gathering, held in Salford also drew some Independent Labour Party branches and groups adhering to the Clarion newspaper, alongside individuals and representatives of smaller socialist groups. It continued to publish the SDF's newspaper, Justice. The resulting organisation, the BSP, contained a multiplicity of views and was organized as a loose federation of clubs and branches rather than as a centralised and disciplined party.

Leading members of the former SDF, led by the party's patriarch, H. M. Hyndman, rapidly took control of the new organisation. This leading group advocated that the BSP place an emphasis on electoral politics and the effort to capture the state through the ballot box rather than through labour agitation, the formation of trade unions, and pursuit of an extra-parliamentary route to power via the strike movement.

This cautious, electoral orientation of Hyndman and the early BSP leadership put the party at odds with the tumultuous situation in workplaces around the country. The five years before the eruption of the First World War in August 1914 were a period of mass labour turmoil. As one historian has noted:

"The mass strike wave of 1910 to 1914 remains unique in British history. A wild, elemental, pent-up force seemed suddenly let loose, disregarding precedents and agreements, impatient of compromise, shaking the old complacent trade unionism by the ears, sometimes, as in the rail strike of 1911, forcing conservative leaders ahead of it like fallen leaves driven before an autumn wind. The trade union leaders, almost to a man, deplored it, the government viewed it with alarm... yet disregarding everything, encouraged only by a small minority of syndicalist leaders, the great strike wave rolled on, threatening to sweep away everything before it."

The 2nd Conference of the BSP was held from 10 to 12 May 1913 at the seaside town of Blackpool. It was attended by about 100 delegates, the majority of whom stood in opposition to the standing Executive Committee of the party. This executive was headed by Henry Hyndman one of the founders of the SDF, an individual who had grown steadily more nationalistic in viewpoint, coming to advocate for the increase of Britain's military budget to oppose potential German aggression. This proved increasingly controversial within the BSP, and opposition to militarism among the party's rank and file came to a head at the 2nd Conference.

The events of the 1913 Blackpool Conference were described by a radical Russian émigré named Vladimir Ulyanov, better known to history by his pen name, N. Lenin:

"[Hyndman] has been acting for a number of years without any attention to the party, and even against the party, on the important question of armaments and war. Hyndman has got it into his head that Germany is threatening to crush and enslave Britain and that socialists should, therefore, support the demand for a 'proper' (i.e., strong) navy for the defence of Britain! * * *

"Understandably, this fancy idea of Hyndman's pleased the British bourgeoisie (the Conservatives and the Liberals). It can also be understood that British Social-Democrats — be it said to their credit — would not tolerate this disgrace and shame and heatedly opposed it.

"The struggle was a long and stubborn one; attempts at a compromise were made, but Hyndman was incorrigible. It is greatly to the advantage of British Socialism that Hyndman was forced to leave the executive at this Conference and the composition of the executive was, in general, changed by 75 percent (of its eight members only two were reelected — Quelch and Irving)."

Further turnover of the executive soon followed, with Harry Quelch dying in London on 17 September 1913.

=== Internationalism versus national defence (1914–1916) ===
The party was hampered by a steady attrition of members and branches due to poor organization. A significant percentage of the membership had no clear conception of Marxist theory and were unwilling to dedicate time and effort to advancing the mission of the organization.

On 13 April 1914 a meeting was convened by the International Socialist Bureau between representatives of three of Britain's leading socialist organisations — the BSP, the Independent Labour Party, and the Fabian Society. The body recommended the formation of a United Socialist Council for the three groups, if the BSP would affiliate with the Labour Party. In line with this recommendation, the party's 1914 Annual Conference decided to take a membership referendum on the question.

The 2nd Conference of the BSP of May 1913 did not resolve the fundamental question facing the party — the decision as to whether it should pursue a policy of anti-militarist internationalism, come what may, or whether it should rally around the flag in the event of military conflict with foreign enemies. The nationalist Hyndman faction had been dealt a defeat at Blackpool, but they remained in the organisation and licked their wounds, preparing for the next battle in the factional war.

The eruption of the First World War in August 1914 made the question of unification of the British socialist movement largely moot. Many socialist organisations internationally split over the question to greater or lesser degree (an exception must be made for most anarchist and syndicalist groups, which were anti-war), into left-wing "internationalist" factions, which continued to seek the united action of the working class against worldwide capitalism without regard to territorial boundaries, and right-wing "defencists", who rallied to their national colors to defend their country in time of military conflict.

This tension between internationalism and national defence was particularly acute in the BSP, as the bitter disagreement had already shown itself in the factional politics of the organisation before the start of the war. Henry Hyndman was the unquestioned leader of the pro-nationalist BSP right, while Zelda Kahan (later Zelda Coates) and William Coates were among the leaders of the BSP's internationalist wing.

Early in 1915 came the inevitable split, with the conservative Hyndman wing of the party leaving to form the Socialist National Defence League, while the leadership was defeated in elections in 1916 by an internationalist group, essentially pacifist, supporting the programme of the Zimmerwald Conference. Hyndman and his followers established the National Socialist Party.

John Maclean, the party's leader in Scotland, was a revolutionary defeatist who played a leading role in the Red Clydeside strikes during the First World War.

=== Triumph of the anti-militarist wing (1916–1918) ===
The party's new leadership, around Secretary Albert Inkpin, Treasurer Alf Watts, and key labour movement leader John Maclean maintained the desire to join the Second International. The BSP was finally accepted into the Labour Party later in 1916.

=== BSP as a proto-communist party (1918–1920) ===
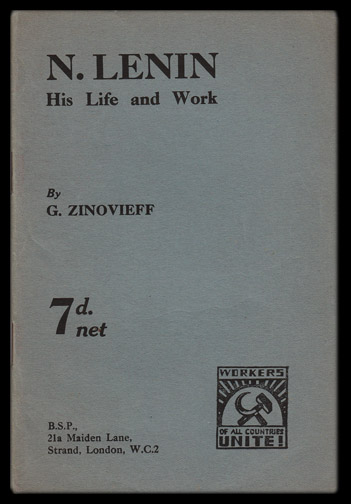
The BSP was a de facto Communist Party prior to the establishment of the CPGB in the summer of 1920.

By 1918, a large percentage of the party, including Inkpin and Maclean, were inspired by the lead of the Bolsheviks in the Russian Revolution and determined to establish a British Communist Party on the model of Lenin's organization in Russia. From this time forward the BSP, devoid of its right wing since 1916, emerged as a de facto Communist party.

Negotiations about unity began with the Socialist Labour Party, a group centred in Scotland espousing a vision of revolutionary industrial unionism not far removed from the Russian soviets, but no agreement could be reached on various organizational details, including the question of whether the new party should affiliate to the Labour Party. An interlude in which the British political landscape was sprinkled with an array of small radical grouplets followed.

The BSP remained the largest of the proto-Communist radical organizations, however, claiming a membership of about 6,000 in 1920. The BSP also gained the cachet of parliamentary representation when it was joined by former Liberal Party MP Cecil L'Estrange Malone.

The BSP remained patient and persistent in its efforts to establish a new Communist Party in Great Britain. During the weekend of 31 July to 1 August 1920, a founding convention was held in London at which the Communist Party of Great Britain was established. The new organization included some dissident members of the SLP and representatives of several other small radical groups, such as the South Wales Communist Council (SWCC), individuals affiliated with the radical shop steward's movement, and adherents of a pro-Comintern faction of the Independent Labour Party.

A Joint Provisional Committee was chosen to organise the foundation convention of the new party. Representatives of the BSP were J. F. Hodgson, A.A. "Alf" Watts, and Fred Willis, joined by Tom Bell, Arthur MacManus, and William Paul of the "Communist Unity Group" faction formerly associated with the SLP, as well as W. J. Hewlett of the SWCC. Secretary was Albert Inkpin of the BSP. The group agreed in advance that a Provisional Executive Committee should be established by the forthcoming Communist Party of Great Britain by the Convention electing six more to add to this list.

Effective with the merger, the BSP and its newspaper, The Call, was terminated, replaced by the new party with its new weekly publication published in London titled The Communist.

The former office of the BSP, located at 21a Maiden Lane, Strand, London, WC2, was made the first office of the newly formed CPGB, which moved to new accommodations within a year.

== Conferences of the BSP ==
Year	Name	Location	Dates	Chair	Delegates
1911	Socialist Unity Conference	Salford	30 Sept – 1 Oct	H. M. Hyndman	219
1912	1st Annual Conference	Manchester	25–27 March	H. M. Hyndman	250
1913	2nd Annual Conference	Blackpool	10–12 March	Dan Irving	106
1914	3rd Annual Conference	London	12–14 April	John Stokes	140
1915	No Conference Held.				
1916	5th Annual Conference	Salford	23–24 April	Arthur Seabury	108
1917	6th Annual Conference	Salford	8–9 April	Sam Farrow	77
1918	7th Annual Conference	Leeds	31 March – 1 April	Fred Shaw	70
1919	8th Annual Conference	Sheffield	20–21 April	Alf Barton	118
1920	9th Annual Conference	London	4–5 April	Joe Vaughan	78

Data from Kendall, The Revolutionary Movement in Britain, pg. 311.

== See also ==
- British Socialist Party election results

== Notable members ==
- Sammy Billthorne
- W. P. Coates
- Zelda Kahan-Coates
- Willie Gallacher
- F. H. Gorle
- Victor Grayson
- Edward Hartley
- J. F. Hodgson
- H. M. Hyndman
- Albert Inkpin
- Dan Irving
- Jack Jones
- Tom Kennedy
- Fred Knee
- Henry W. Lee
- James Litterick
- John Maclean
- Cecil L'Estrange Malone
- Tom Mann
- William McLaine
- Harry McShane
- Ivor Montagu
- Dora Montefiore
- Walton Newbold
- Conrad Noel
- Jacob Peters
- Harry Pollitt
- Harry Quelch
- Tom Quelch
- Andrew Rothstein
- Theodore Rothstein
- Will Thorne
- A. A. "Alf" Watts
- Tom Williams
- Fred Willis
