= Labour Elector =

The Labour Elector was a British socialist publication. The Labour Elector was edited by Henry Hyde Champion (a former member of the Social Democratic Federation) and published from London. The newspaper was sold at one penny. The founding of the newspaper was preceded by the May 1888 Southampton by-election, in which Champion's Labour Electoral Association had helped ensure the electoral victory of the liberal candidate Francis Evans. The Labour Elector argued in favour of the foundation of an 'Independent Labour Party'.

The Labour Elector was published monthly between June and October 1888, fortnightly between 1 November 1888 and 1 December 1888, and weekly between 5 January 1889 and 19 April 1890. The Labour Elector experienced a boom in its readership during the London Dock Strike of 1889. At the time the editorial board of the newspaper was joined by John Burns and Cunninghame Graham. However, the two soon found themselves uncomfortable with Champion's way of running the newspaper. Champion controlled the newspaper editorial line, assisted by Maltman Barry as his sub-editor. Burns and Graham left the newspaper in connection with an attack published in the pages of the Labour Elector on The Star editor Ernest Parke.

Publication was discontinued in April 1890, as its founder Champion left for Australia to organize trade unions there (an alternative account states that the shift to Australia was motived by health reasons). Publication of the Labour Elector was resumed in January 1893 (as a weekly). In June 1893 it was converted into a monthly publication, and in January 1894 the Labour Elector again ceased publication.
