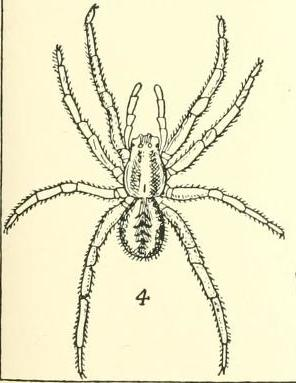
- 4. Venator marginatus (female)
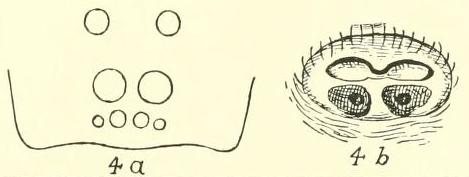
- 4a eyes, 4b genital structure

Scientific classification
- Kingdom: Animalia
- Phylum: Arthropoda
- Subphylum: Chelicerata
- Class: Arachnida
- Order: Araneae
- Infraorder: Araneomorphae
- Family: Lycosidae
- Genus: Venator
- Species: V. marginatus

Binomial name
- Venator marginatus Hogg, 1900

= Venator marginatus =

Species of spider

Venator marginatus is a wolf spider (i.e., in the Lycosidae family), endemic to Australia and found in Victoria.

It was described in 1900 by Henry Roughton Hogg. However, in 2015 Volker Framenau declared it "incerta sedis", stating that it was known from two female specimens, the morphology of whose genitalia failed to match those of the genus. (This view is accepted by the Australian Faunal Directory.)
