= Henry Hyde Champion =

British-Australian socialist journalist and activist

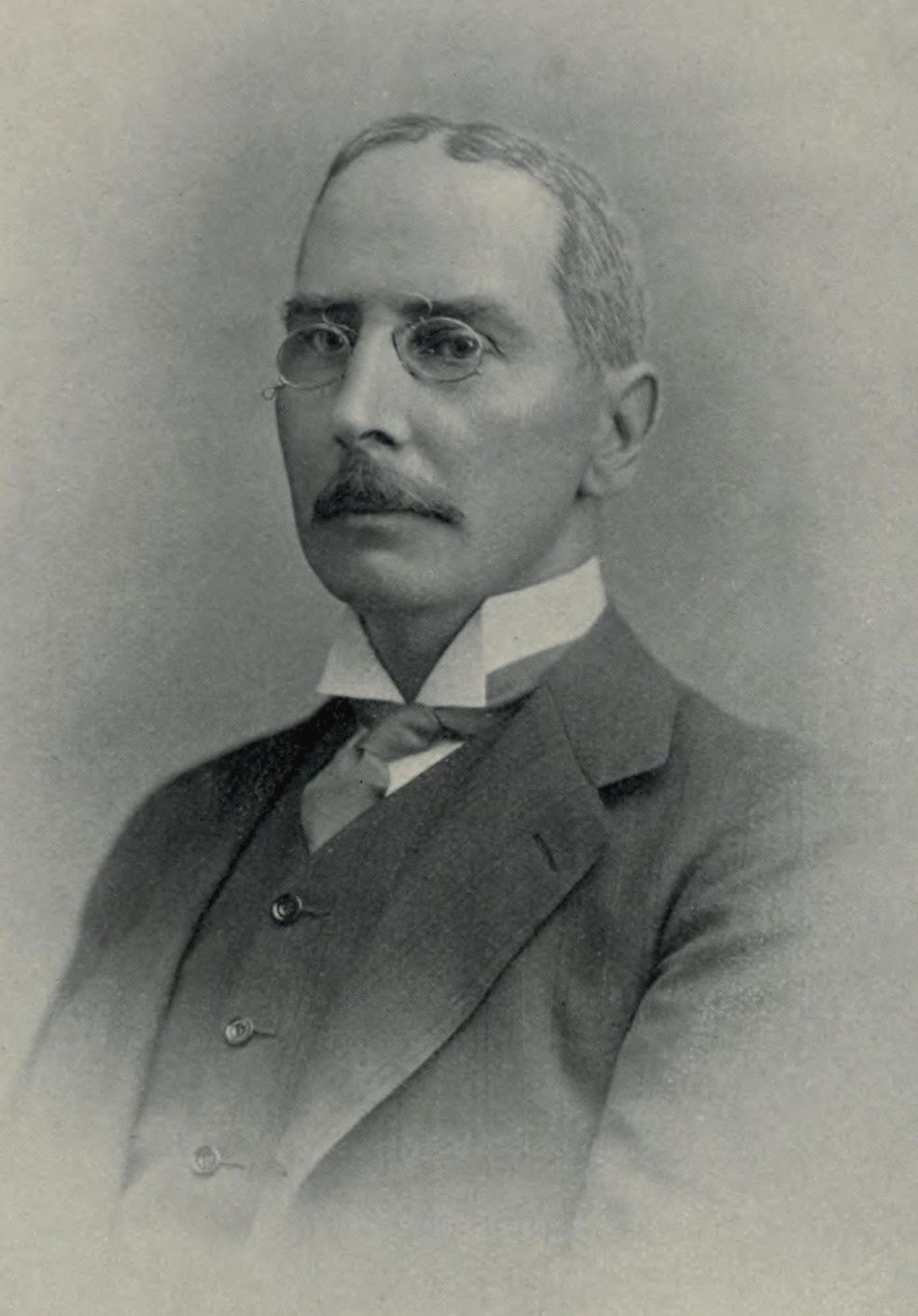
- Photographic portrait of Henry Hyde Champion.
- Born: Henry Hyde Champion; 22 January 1859; Poona, India
- Died: 30 April 1928 (aged 69); South Yarra, Melbourne, Australia
- Occupations: Writer, journalist, activist
- Spouse(s): (1) Juliet Bennett (2) Elsie Belle Goldstein

Henry Hyde Champion (22 January 1859 – 30 April 1928) was a socialist, journalist and activist, regarded as a leading figure in the early political organisations of the British labour movement. From a middle-class background, he was an early advocate of socialism in Britain. However, Champion was dogged by persistent mistrust within the labour movement arising from his lack of working-class roots and his self-presentation as a 'gentleman' with refined tastes and mannerisms. In 1894 he left Britain for Australia where he spent the latter part of his life.

From 1883 to 1887 Champion was a key member of the Social Democratic Federation (SDF), Britain's first socialist political organisation. In 1888 Champion became secretary of the Labour Electoral Association and established the Labour Elector journal. He was a member of the strike committee of the London dock strike of August and September 1889. Champion visited Australia from August 1890 to February 1891, during which his lukewarm support for a major industrial dispute led to him being described as a 'traitor' to the unionist cause. After returning to Britain he participated in various political activities and resurrected the Labour Elector. In 1893 his attempts to take a leadership role in the newly-formed Independent Labour Party were undermined by a growing suspicion of his allegiances to working class causes and labour politics.

After returning to Australia in 1894 Champion settled in Melbourne and made a living as a journalist and publisher. He supported various causes and participated in political activities, including the formation of the Victorian Socialist Party. In 1898 Champion married Elsie Belle Goldstein and the couple established the Book Lover's Library and Bookshop. Champion became a book publisher under the imprint of the Australasian Authors' Agency. After a period of declining health, Champion died in Melbourne in 1928.

== Biography ==
=== Early life ===
Henry Hyde Champion was born on 22 January 1859 in Poona, in the Maharashtra state in western India, the eldest son of James Hyde Champion, an officer in the Bombay Army, and his wife Henrietta (née Urquhart). Henry's mother was from a family of aristocratic Scottish descent and there was a military tradition on both sides of his family. When he turned four years of age Henry was brought to England by his mother to begin his schooling. From 1873, aged thirteen, he was educated at Marlborough College, a public school at Marlborough in the county of Wiltshire. Henry's father retired from service in India in 1877, having attained the rank of major-general.

After completing his secondary education Champion attended the Royal Military Academy at Woolwich in south-east London. In 1878, after graduation, he was commissioned as a lieutenant in the Royal Artillery and was posted to the Bombay Presidency of British India. During his service in India Champion participated in the Anglo-Afghan War of 1878-1880. After becoming ill with typhoid, in 1881 Champion was invalided back to England, by that stage disillusioned with British imperialism and the treatment of its subject population in India.

During his convalescence Champion was taken to the slums of London's East End by Percy Frost, a friend from his school days at Marlborough College and the son of a wealthy clergyman, where they witnessed the poverty that existed there. Later in 1881, while Champion was still on sick leave from the Army, the two friends visited the United States. In America Champion read Progress and Poverty by Henry George. The author argued for a tax on land as the answer to ending poverty and for a time Champion was a "devoted adherent" of the American reformer's economic philosophy. After returning to England, on 17 September 1882 Champion resigned from the British Army in protest at the British conquest of Egypt and joined the British socialist movement. Champion's commitment to socialism as a young man was described by his biographer, John Barnes, as being a process "akin to discovering a sense of mission".

=== The Socialist movement ===
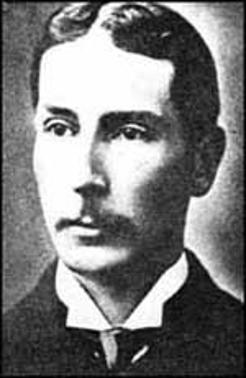
Photograph of Henry Hyde Champion (probably from the 1880s).

After he resigned his commission from the Army in late 1882, Champion received sufficient capital from his father to invest in an established publishing house. After three months he declined the offer of a directorship in the firm, withdrew his money and purchased a half-share in a printing press owned by John C. Foulger, a radical who was publishing a monthly journal called Modern Thought. Their printing business in Paternoster Row operated under the imprint of 'The Modern Press'.

Champion's earliest political associates were men with whom he shared a public-school background. By June 1883 he and James L. Joynes (who had been schooled at Eton College) were editing The Christian Socialist: A Journal for Thoughtful Men, a publication of the newly-formed Land Reform League. The journal identified with the Christian socialism of F. D. Maurice and Charles Kingsley and had an editorial policy of excluding "class hatreds and class prejudices".

On 9 August 1883 Champion married twenty-eight year-old Juliet Bennett. Champion makes no mention of his wife in his later writings and little is known of Juliet except that she died after less than three years of marriage, one of the causes of her death being ascribed to alcoholism.

Champion "played a central role" in the formation of the Fellowship of the New Life, an organisation based on the ideas of Scottish philosopher Thomas Davidson. The objective of the society was "cultivation of a perfect character in each and all" by setting an example of clean simplified living, with many of the Fellowship's members advocating pacifism, vegetarianism and simple living. Champion was one of sixteen present at the inaugural meeting on 24 October 1883 in the London suburb of Regent's Park. Others present at the first meeting were Henry Havelock Ellis and Champion's Christian Socialist co-editor James Joynes. Soon after its formation some of the Fellowship members, including Champion, expressed a desire for a degree of political involvement, leading to the formation of a separate organisation named the Fabian Society. Although involved in its formation, Champion took no further part in the Fabian movement after he became actively involved with the Social Democratic Federation.

In 1884 The Modern Press acquired and financed a periodical called To-day: The Monthly Magazine of Scientific Socialism which had been published since April 1883, edited by Ernest Belfort Bax and James L. Joynes. After the acquisition Champion became a joint editor. In 1884 an early novel by George Bernard Shaw, An Unsocial Socialist, was serialised in To-day magazine. An earlier novel by Shaw called Cashel Byron's Profession was serialised in To-day from April 1885 to March 1886 and published in book form by The Modern Press later in 1886 (the first of Shaw's works to be published as a book).

=== The Social Democratic Federation ===
By 1883 Champion was the secretary of the Democratic Federation, a political organisation whose chairman was Henry M. Hyndman, a journalist from a wealthy middle-class background who had been converted to socialism after reading Karl Marx's The Communist Manifesto. The Democratic Federation had been formed in 1881 as a union of radical and republican organisations with an agenda based on the collectivisation of property in Great Britain (as proposed in Hyndman's England for All). In 1883 the Democratic Federation issued a socialistic manifesto demanding adult suffrage, a republican government and nationalisation of land and "other means of producing and distributing wealth". Champion, as secretary, was one of ten signatories to the document. In January 1884 the Democratic Federation began producing a weekly newspaper called Justice, initially edited by Charles L. Fitzgerald but soon afterwards replaced in that role by Hyndman. Champion contributed to the Justice newspaper, including a series of articles on "wage slaves" focussing on the "intellectual proletariat" working in shops and offices. At the fourth annual conference of the Democratic Federation, held on 9 August 1884, the party's name was changed to the Social Democratic Federation (SDF).

From mid-1885 the SDF began holding open-air meetings at Dod Street, an established location for Sunday meetings and public oratory in the riverside Limehouse district of London. On 9 August 1885 a SDF member, W. B. Parker, was arrested while speaking to a crowd of onlookers on the corner of Dod and Burdett streets. He was charged with obstruction and bound over to keep the peace for six months (in default £20). During the week Champion wrote to the Home Secretary, Sir Richard Cross, objecting to the SDF being singled out by police. On the following Sunday Champion himself was arrested while speaking at Dod Street. These incidents led to a series of arrests of SDF speakers at Dod Street. As the crowds grew, the confrontation between the SDF and the police escalated. On 6 September Jack Williams was arrested and fined 40 shillings or one month's imprisonment, and chose the latter. This was followed by further meetings in support of free assembly, with other left-wing organisations also putting up speakers, supported by crowds of several thousand. Further arrests were made, and a large crowd gathered outside the courthouse when the cases were heard. A large socialist demonstration was held on 27 September 1885, with a crowd estimated to number sixty thousand. On the eve of a general election, the Conservative Party Home Secretary ordered that the police should not interfere.

The SDF decided to run a parliamentary candidate in the November 1885 general election in a seat in Nottingham (where three branches of the SDF had been established). John Burns, a strong public speaker with a working-class and unionist background (and member of the SDF executive), was chosen to contest the Nottingham West constituency, supported by a local committee and a local newspaper. At the last minute SDF candidates were also nominated for two seats in London (in Hampstead and Kennington), using funds offered to Champion from an unidentified source. Burns and the two London candidates (Jack Williams in Hampstead and John Fielding at Kennington) were the first socialist parliamentary candidates in British history. Although each of the SDF candidates were unsuccessful at the general election, the "pathetically small vote" for the two London candidates (a combined total of fifty-nine votes) damaged the public reputation of the SDF. The "fiasco of the London candidatures" prompted George Bernard Shaw to observe that "all England is satisfied we are a paltry handful of blackguards". The prevailing suspicion was that the funds had come from the Conservative Party with the intention of taking votes from the Liberal Party by splitting the progressive vote. Champion had received the offer of funds through his friend, the journalist Maltman Barry, a former Marxist variously described as a "maverick Tory Radical" and a "Conservative agent". The offer had been accepted and an amount of £340 was transferred to the SDF. After the election it was found that Hyndman and Champion had acted without consultation and that the SDF treasurer, J. Hunter Watts, was unaware of the transaction. Watts publicised details of the affair in an "angry letter" to The Pall Mall Gazette. In The Democrat journal of 12 December 1885 the journalist and member of the SDF executive council, Charles L. Fitzgerald, denounced Hyndman and Champion for their irresponsibility and for "trying to run the Federation in military style". Champion was subject to recurring accusations of having received 'Tory gold' and the controversy was to dog him for the remainder of his political life.^{[A]} After the details of the 'Tory gold' episode became known, Champion resigned as secretary of the SDF (possibly a decision forced upon him).

In certain ways Champion was not suited to formal organisational structures. The respected trade unionist Tom Mann described him as "a man of vigorous individuality" who would sometimes "act upon his own initiative" and "commit the organisation to plans and projects without consultation". Mann concluded that Champion "was profoundly convinced that his judgment was right" and when situations arose necessitating decisive action "he could not endure to wait several days before the committee met". Champion's biographer, John Barnes, makes the point that his subject favoured open-air meetings and demonstrations as a way of focussing attention on particular issues and playing "upon the anxieties of the governing class", with such occasions satisfying "his desire for action, and his taste for theatre".

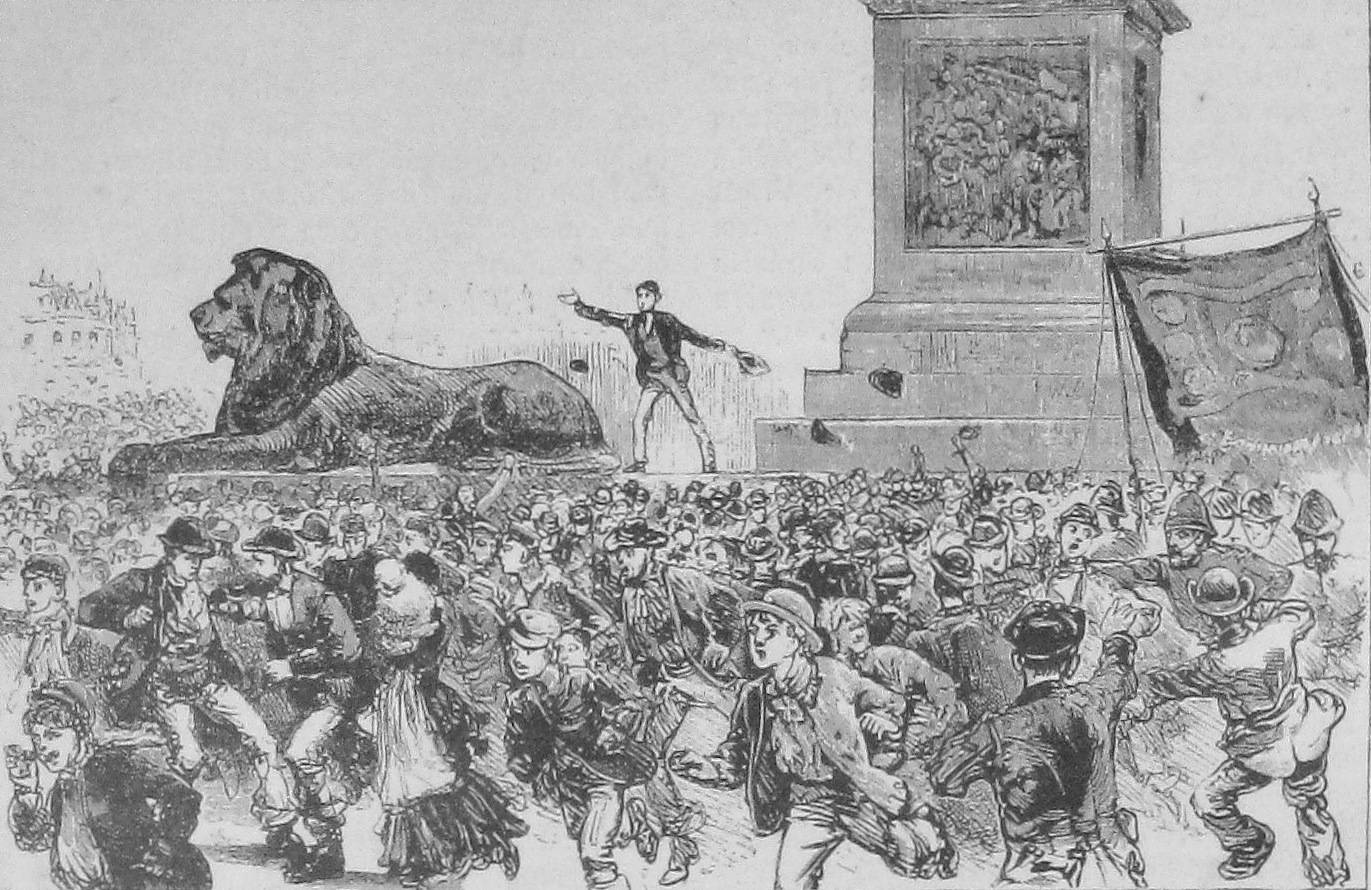
'Break up of the Trafalgar-Square meeting', published in The Illustrated London News, 13 February 1886.

The mid-1880s were years of high unemployment in Britain, a condition that liberal and leftist groups ascribed to cheaper foreign imports taking British jobs under free trade conditions. Agitation for tariff reform came from two distinct movements, the socialists (represented by groups such as the SDF) and protectionists such as the Fair Trade League, existing side-by-side but with distinct differences in ideology. The underlying idea common to both was Protectionism, but where the Fair Traders "postulated that the workers needed to be protected from enemies abroad", socialists by contrast maintained "their enemies were in their midst" with foreign competitors often being "financed by British capital unpatriotically invested in foreign lands".

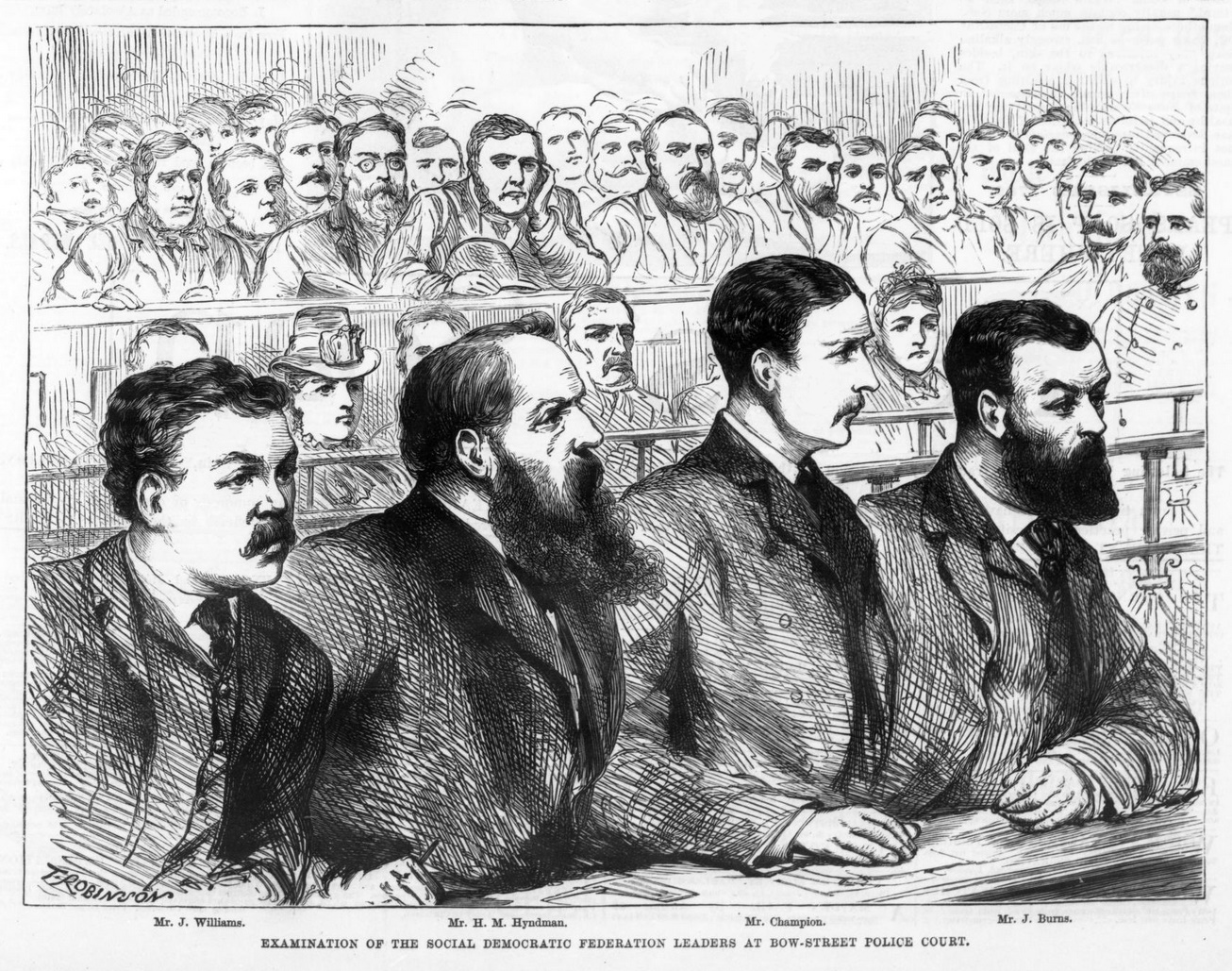
The SDF leaders in the Bow-Street Police Court, (left to right) Jack Williams, Henry M. Hyndman, Henry Hyde Champion and John Burns (published in The Illustrated London News, 27 February 1886).

The Trafalgar Square Riots of 8 February 1886 were disorders in the West End of London following a counter-demonstration by the Social Democratic Federation in Trafalgar Square against a meeting of the Fair Trade League. The meeting in Trafalgar Square ended in a riot and a destructive attack on the clubs in Pall Mall and St. James Street and on shops in Picadilly and Audley Street, after which another open-air meeting was held near the Achilles statue in Hyde Park. The four SDF speakers, Jack Williams, Henry Hyndman, Henry Hyde Champion and John Burns, were "charged with maliciously and seditiously contriving to disturb the peace, and to incite people to riot and tumult, by inflammatory words moving to hatred of the law and government of the realm". On 17 February they were brought before the chief magistrate at the Bow Street Police Court. After evidence was given by journalists regarding what was said by the defendants at the Trafalgar Square and Hyde Park meetings, the case was adjourned for a week, with the defendants admitted to bail. Belford Bax posted bail for Champion.

The four defendants were eventually brought to trial at the Old Bailey on 6 April 1886, charged with "uttering seditious words and with conspiring together to utter seditious words". Burns and Williams were defended by Mr. W. Thompson and Champion and Hyndman conducted their own defence. The prosecution was led by the Attorney-General Sir Charles Russell. On 10 April the jury returned a verdict of not guilty for each of the four defendants. In announcing the verdicts the foreman singled out Burns and Champion for a special comment, saying that the jury "are of opinion that the language of Messrs. Burns and Champion was highly inflammatory and greatly to be condemned, but on the whole of the facts brought before us we acquit those two defendants of any seditious intent".

=== Labour Elector ===
During 1887 Champion resigned his membership of the SDF.^{[B]} His views had become increasingly divergent from the SDF under Hyndman's direction; by then he was convinced "that the future of socialism in Britain depended upon gaining parliamentary power". In May 1887 he began a monthly journal called Common Sense. In June and July 1887 Champion delivered a series of four lectures "at a fashionable venue in Piccadilly", proposing a moderate socialist agenda. His final lecture, 'Constructive Socialism', proposed reforms such as "a more democratic parliament, free elementary education, an eight-hour day, graduated income-tax, nationisation of railways, and taxing of mining royalties". Champion's article in the September 1887 issue of Common Sense, titled 'The Future of Socialism in England', set forth his criticisms of the SDF, renounced the use of force, and advocated the putting up of socialist candidates for parliament.

In 1888 Champion joined the Labour Electoral Association and became secretary of that organisation. The Association, set up by the Trades Union Congress in 1886 to support the election to parliament of trade union candidates, provided a framework for Champion's campaign to intervene in the mainstream contest between the Conservative and Liberal parties by running labour movement candidates. His most significant effort was in Scotland, supporting the candidature of Keir Hardie for the Mid Lanarkshire by-election held in April 1888. Champion ran the by-election campaign from London, acquiring funds, arranging for a local organiser, writing articles and trying (without success) to persuade the Liberal party organisation to refrain from running a candidate. In the end, however, the by-election was won by the Liberal John Philipps. Hardie, running as an Independent Labour candidate received just 8.4 percent of the votes.

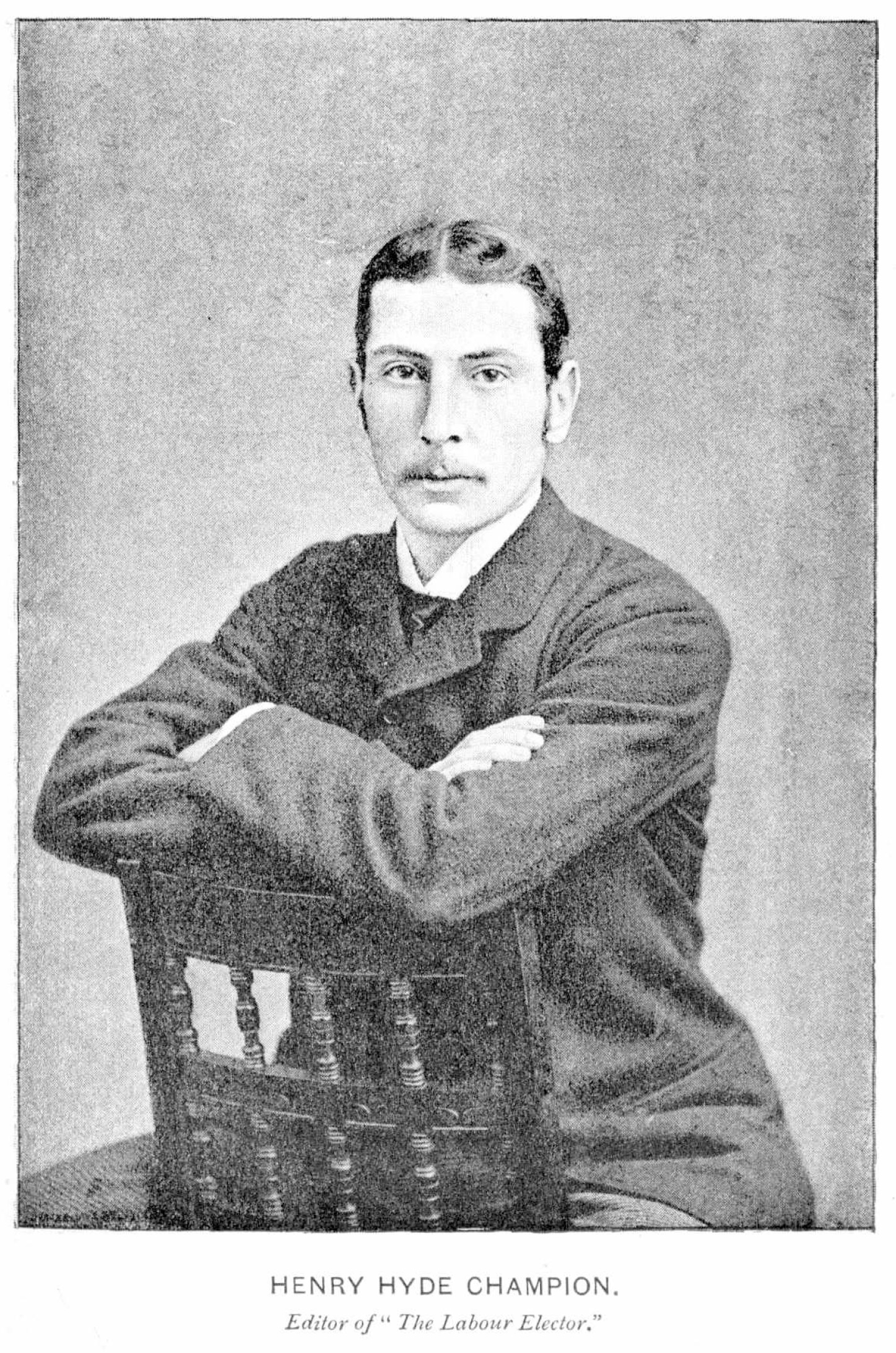
'Henry Hyde Champion, editor of Labour Elector', published in the booklet The Great Dock Strike in London, August, 1889, published in 1890.

In June 1888 Champion established the monthly journal Labour Elector (with Maltman Barry as a sub-editor), declaring that it was being published so that "all interested in the formation of a Labour Party may be provided with information about its progress and achievement". By August 1888 Hardie, realising that the labour movement could not rely on the Liberals for electoral success, collaborated with the former Liberal Cunninghame Graham and others to form the Scottish Parliamentary Labour Party. By the second issue of Labour Elector Champion had started a campaign against the British chemical industrialist and Liberal Party politician John Brunner, exposing the harsh conditions for workers at the Brunner-Mond chemical plant. From January 1889 the Labour Elector, by now subtitled "The Organ of Practical Socialism", was published weekly. In July 1889, after Brunner had initiated a libel suit against the journal and with growing financial concerns, the Labour Elector was placed under the control of a committee of management (with members including Tom Mann and John Burns), though Champion retained editorial control.

Champion was one of the speakers at a rally in Hyde Park on 28 July 1889 after the newly-formed National Union of Gas Stokers and General Labourers, headed by Will Thorne, gained an eight-hour day for its members.

When the London dock strike began in August 1889, the trade union organiser Ben Tillett asked both John Burns and Tom Mann to join the strike committee. It was also suggested that Champion's services would be useful. With his "Fleet Street contacts and his journalistic ability" Champion took on the role of press officer for the striking dockers. Though he was the only non-working-class member of the strike committee, he was nevertheless "trusted and respected" by the other strike leaders. In a report of a meeting of striking dock-workers in September 1889, a journalist for The Times observed that Champion's "influence is not great among the men, to whom cool reason and a cultivated accent do not appeal". The Labour Elector became the published mouthpiece of the strike, selling up to twenty thousand copies and occasionally being issued in several editions. The month-long strike, resulting in the successful granting of a pay claim of a minimum of sixpence per hour, was boosted by substantial funds contributed by the Australian labour movement.

An episode in early 1890 undermined whatever goodwill Champion may have acquired in progressive circles from his activities during the dock-workers' strike. In July 1889 a homosexual male brothel was discovered by the police in central London leading to a series of incidents that became known as the Cleveland Street scandal. The brothel keeper managed to leave the country to avoid prosecution, but several of the young male prostitutes were tried and received lenient sentences. During the investigation certain members of the British nobility were named as patrons of the brothel. By early January 1890 as many as sixty suspected patrons had been identified, many of whom had fled the country. In November 1889 Ernest Parke, the editor of a radical weekly journal The North London Press, named Henry FitzRoy, the Earl of Euston, as one who had fled abroad to escape being charged in the scandal. FitzRoy had been named as a brothel patron, but had not gone abroad, and sued Parke for criminal libel. On 16 January 1890 Parke was found guilty and sentenced to twelve months in prison, an outcome that outraged progressive opinion. On the front page of the 25 January 1890 issue of the Labour Elector a short article described Parke's sentence as "a salutary lesson", adding that if FitzRoy had gone to Parke's workplace "and there and then physically twisted the little wretch's neck nobody would have blamed him". It was later revealed that the article, "siding with a suspect aristocrat... against a hard-working, well-meaning editor, who favoured trade unionism", had been written by Maltman Barry, but Champion stood by his sub-editor and accepted editorial responsibility. Burns resigned from the journal's management committee over the matter and Mann and another committee member, George Bateman, both disavowed Barry's article in the pages of Labour Elector.

The Labour Elector ceased publication in April 1890. The decision to suspend the journal was probably forced upon Champion "by a lack of capital and declining readership", the support and good-will from its role in the dock strike having fully dissipated. In April 1890 an article by Champion was published in the monthly journal The Nineteenth Century; titled 'The Labour Movement: A Multitude of Counsellors', it was written under the pseudonym 'Blake the socialist'. On 17 May 1890 Champion was the main speaker at a labour rally of twenty thousand people at Aberdeen in north-east Scotland.

Champion decided to visit Australia, where the labour movement was active and had made significant gains (such as the eight-hour day in the colony of Victoria); in the words of an article about him in The Pall Mall Gazette (7 February 1891), Champion "went off to study the Labour Question in the Workman’s Paradise". He had also been commissioned to write reports for The Times and The Nineteenth Century during his visit to Australia. In early June Champion vacated his office in Paternoster Row and went to Germany for three weeks, possibly staying there with Margaret Harkness. On 5 July 1890 Champion, accompanied by his friend Percy Frost, departed for Australia aboard the Orient Company's steamer RMS Oruba. Champion's biographer, John Barnes, suggests that the socialist crusader's visit to Australia was made in order to "recover lost prestige and authority as a labour leader".

=== Visit to Australia ===
Champion disembarked from the RMS Oruba at Melbourne on 12 August 1890. On the same day he attended the Victorian Legislative Assembly and presented a letter of introduction to Alfred Deakin, the leading liberal politician in Victoria, who showed him over the houses of parliament. Champion's arrival in Australia had been preceded by a series of articles written by him, titled 'The Labor Movement in England', published in Melbourne's The Age newspaper from late June to mid-July 1890. Champion arrived bearing letters of introduction "to the leading labour organisers in Australia" from his colleague John Burns, the respected British unionist and hero of the 1889 London dock strike.

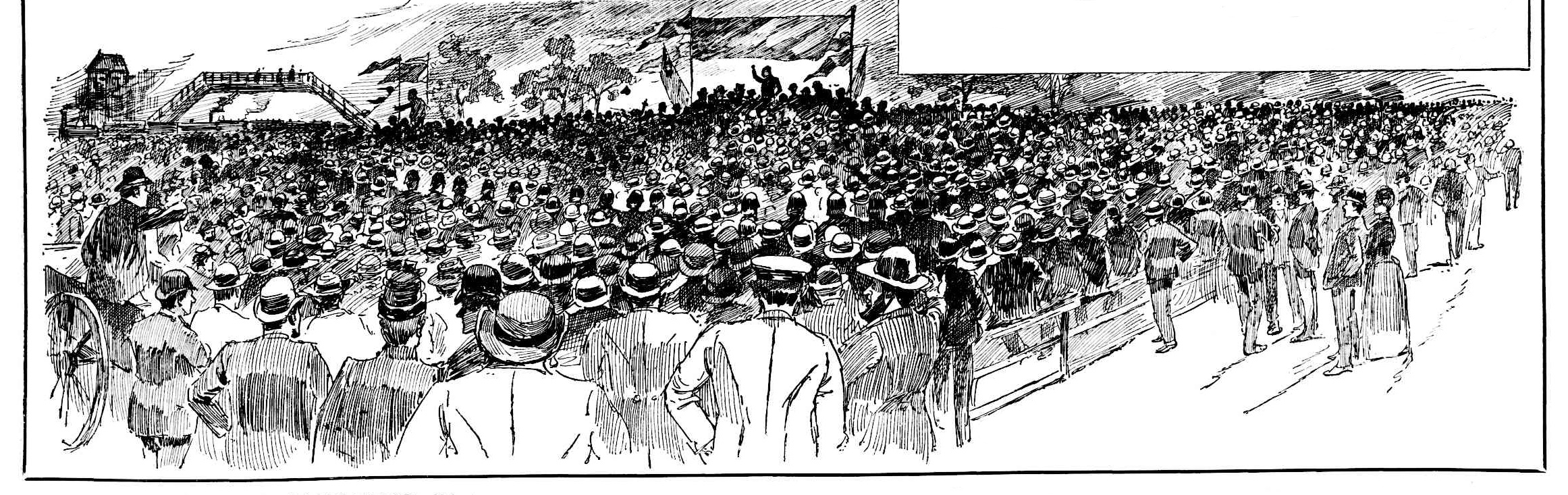
'The Mass Meeting of Trade Unionists in Flinders Park, Melbourne', published in Illustrated Sydney News, 27 September 1890.

Three days after Champion arrived in Melbourne a major industrial dispute commenced when the Mercantile Marine Officers' Association directed its members to give twenty-four hours notice after pay and conditions negotiations with the Steamship Owners' Association of Victoria broke down. Champion, described in The Age as "the well known English advocate of the rights of labor", was invited to address the Trades Hall Council on 20 August 1890. It was reported that the attending union members "warmed towards Mr. Champion as reference was made to his connection with the London Dock strike, and when he resumed his seat the building resounded with hearty applause". On 31 August he was one of the speakers at a "mass meeting of working men", estimated to number thirty to forty thousand, at Melbourne's Flinders Park. Champion followed the speech by William Trenwith, at that stage the only member of parliament representing the labour movement in the Victorian Legislative Assembly. Champion's address to the crowd was described as "a good speech, clever, forcible, just the right length, but the speaker lacks the quality which all the others possess, of personal interest in the movement".

After first claiming he had not come to offer advice, on 6 September 1890 The Age published a long article by Champion titled 'The Labor Crisis' in which he offered advice to both sides of the dispute. Describing himself in the article as "the most advanced and resolute trade unionist in Australia", Champion set out the principles he believed should be followed by the opposing parties. In general, however, Champion's analysis received an unfavourable reaction from trade unionists who interpreted his words as an endorsement of the employers' position. Champion's next contribution in The Age caused even more disquiet amongst unionists. In the article 'British Labor Congress: What Would Burns and Mann Say?' he implied that the heroes of the British trade-union movement, John Burns and Tom Mann (who Champion described as "my personal friends"), would fully endorse his views on the Australian dispute. Even though he had not directly communicated with them about the issues, Champion wrote: "My position is therefore the peculiar one of being the only person whom they know and trust who can, in this crisis, convey to them a trustworthy account of affairs here". Champion's comments led to a suspicion from labour leaders that he was responsible for adversely affecting the flow of funds from Britain to support striking workers.

The strike had begun with a walk-out of a few hundred ships' officers, but after a month of dramatic escalation it was joined by officers and seamen, wharf labourers, gas stokers and coal miners across Victoria, New South Wales, Queensland, South Australia and New Zealand. The employers in the eastern colonies presented a united front in response to the striking workers. Conditions of high unemployment enabled them to hire non-union labour, so they opted to resist direct negotiations with the unions. As the strike progressed it became increasingly unpopular and divisions within the union leadership grew. Champion travelled to Sydney in mid-September in the belief he could act as mediator in the dispute, but suspicions about his motives ensured that "he was not in a position to take the leadership role that so attracted him". In Sydney he met with the Lord Mayor and Edmund Barton, but was either ignored or experienced hostility from local union leaders. After he returned to Melbourne Champion's article 'A Way Out', published in The Age on 2 October, sought to clarify the issues between the opposing sides. However, with the employers resisting a conference with the unions and the absence of a cohesive strategy from the strike leadership, the widespread industrial dispute remained unresolved.

An intervention by Champion in mid-October 1890 led to him being openly described as a 'traitor' to the unionist cause. After a Sydney unionist had cabled John Burns in London asking for a loan of twenty thousand pounds to sustain the strike, Champion reacted by sending a telegram to Burns advising him that the Australian strike was being "grossly mismanaged" and that the requested funds would be wasted and "could not prevent its absolute failure". Champion followed this action by advising the editor of The Age of the contents of the telegram. Other disparaging rumours and accusations began to circulate about Champion within the labour movement (such as him being an accredited correspondent of the London Times and having enrolled as a special constable to assist the police in the case of disturbances by striking workers).

The strike finally ended in November 1890 after the marine officers had agreed to disaffiliate from the Trades Hall Council and the New South Wales unions capitulated. At a mass meeting in Melbourne on 13 November 1890 of wharf labourers, seamen, cooks and stewards and gas stokers at the Hiberian Hall, the strike was declared to be over. The committee chairman John Hancock explained that "they found it useless to maintain the fight any longer", especially with unemployed unionists from Sydney "coming to Melbourne and taking the positions of the men on strike". William Trenwith also addressed the meeting and spoke of Champion, describing him as "a champion of renegades" and remarking that "the unionists of Melbourne had received him with open arms only to find that they had taken a serpent into their bosom". Stimulated by comments from Trenwith and Hancock, Champion was denounced "as a traitor and capitalist stooge" at the meeting. At a meeting of the Trades Hall Council the next evening a letter from Champion was read, requesting permission to address the council members "at an early date". After discussing the matter a resolution was passed declining to hear him, but to ask him "to put any statement he wished to make in writing", citing as a reason "the injury Mr. Champion had done to the labor cause in this colony". Champion refused to take a backward step. In The Age of 17 November 1890 his article 'Experience Teaches' described the recent strike as a "fiasco" and denounced the labour leaders Trenwith, Hancock and William Murphy for their "shortsightedness" and their adoption of a "suicidal course". He accused them of "having to divert attention from their own blunders" by attacking him.

Even though there was growing disquiet and dissension within the Melbourne Trades Hall Council regarding the handling of the strike, in the end an appeal "to working-class solidarity always carried the day". The historian John Barnes observed that Champion was deaf to such an appeal and "in every way, he was tailor-made to be a union scapegoat". He looked and acted like the capitalist employers they opposed, he consorted with them and helped their cause "by exposing the weaknesses of the unions".^{[C]}

Champion contributed an article to the February 1891 edition of The Nineteenth Century on the subject of the Australian labour strike. He strongly condemned the actions of the union leaders, describing the striking labourers to an "army of lions led by asses". He claimed the results of the struggle was "a crushing defeat" for the labour movement and resulted in the "welding of the employers into a solid and irresistible force". A reply to Champion's criticisms was published in the same journal the following month written by John Fitzgerald, a unionist from Sydney who had travelled to London during the maritime strike to raise support for the striking Australian workers.

In August 1890, soon after his arrival in Australia, Champion had met Henry and Adelaide Hogg on a social occasion in Melbourne. Hogg was a Melbourne businessman with an interest in biology and taxonomy (most specifically of spiders). His wife Adelaide was the daughter of Alexander Lang Elder, founder of the successful wool-selling Elders company. Henry Hogg and Adelaide Elder had married in London in 1881; their only children was an adopted daughter (born in about 1885). At some stage, soon after they met, Adelaide Hogg and Henry Champion engaged in a secret love affair that lasted for a number of years.

Champion left Melbourne aboard the P. and O. steamer Valetta on 28 February 1891 and arrived in London on 7 April. In early April 1891, a little more than a month after Champion's departure, Adelaide Hogg and her adopted child left Melbourne to travel to London aboard the R.M.S. Ormuz.

=== The Independent Labour Party ===
In London Adelaide Hogg was involved in nursing her sister Annie, who was ill. During her stay she rekindled her relationship with Henry Champion.

On 19 June 1891 in Aberdeen, Champion gave a talk on 'The Future of Democracy' at a meeting organised by the Aberdeen Trades Council. In the July 1891 issue of The Nineteenth Century Champion's article 'A Labour Inquiry' (in the form of a dialogue) spoke of the need for "the educated class" to accept their "political duties" and "take their share in the guidance and education of the working class", otherwise the option for "the workman... is too often confined to the unscrupulous and the self seekers". Soon after Champion's return to London the editor of The Nineteenth Century James Knowles had offered him the job of sub-editor of the monthly journal. In December 1891 Knowles was stricken with typhoid and Champion took over as editor for two months. Champion remained in the role of sub-editor, working part-time, until 1893. During this period Champion divided his time between London and Aberdeen, his part-time position as sub-editor allowing him to continue his political activities.

Champion stood for the seat of South Aberdeen in the general election of July 1892 as an independent labour candidate. His opponents were the sitting member from the Liberal Party and a candidate from the break-away Liberal Unionist Party. He campaigned strongly but failed to win the seat, although he managed to secure the highest vote of any labour-aligned candidate in Scotland. At the declaration of the poll Champion made an assertive speech, telling his supporters that "so long as he had money, health, and leisure, he was quite ready to fight the battle of labour here or elsewhere". Elsewhere in the United Kingdom independent labour candidates met with success. Keir Hardie in South West Ham and John Burns in Battersea won their seats against Conservative opponents and J. Havelock Wilson in Middlesbrough was successful against a Gladstonian Liberal and a Liberal Unionist. Champion was actively involved in a movement that sought to consolidate and build upon the electoral gains by forming a national independent labour organisation. In September 1892 the Trades Union Congress appointed a committee to organise a conference in January 1893 of all the local independent labour parties. Champion began to contact groups in various parts of the country and rally supporters in an effort to gather a majority of delegates to support his views. However disquiet about his activities in Australia and his continued association with Maltman Barry, viewed by many as a Tory agent, served to undermine his efforts.

On 7 January 1893 the Labour Elector was resurrected, published for the first time since April 1890. The editorial in the new issue stated that "although Mr. Champion is not now nominally Editor of the Journal, his spirit will continue to animate and direct it". By this time Champion was ill to the extent that he was forced to miss the conference at Bradford, held a week later from 14 to 16 January, at which the Independent Labour Party (ILP) was formed. Politically Champion found himself isolated. He was the honorary president of the Aberdeen branch of the ILP, but elsewhere his support base was diminished. His determination to take a leadership role in the ILP organisation was alienating prominent labour leaders like Burns, Hardie and Cunninghame Graham. The Bradford conference was notable for "the presence of a new type of delegate", respectable, articulate working-class men able to speak for themselves and willing to take on positions of authority. As the historian John Barnes summarised it: "Champion had chosen to turn away from the educated elite to which he belonged by birth and education, but his conception of leadership remained elitist, out of tune with democratic and collectivist values".

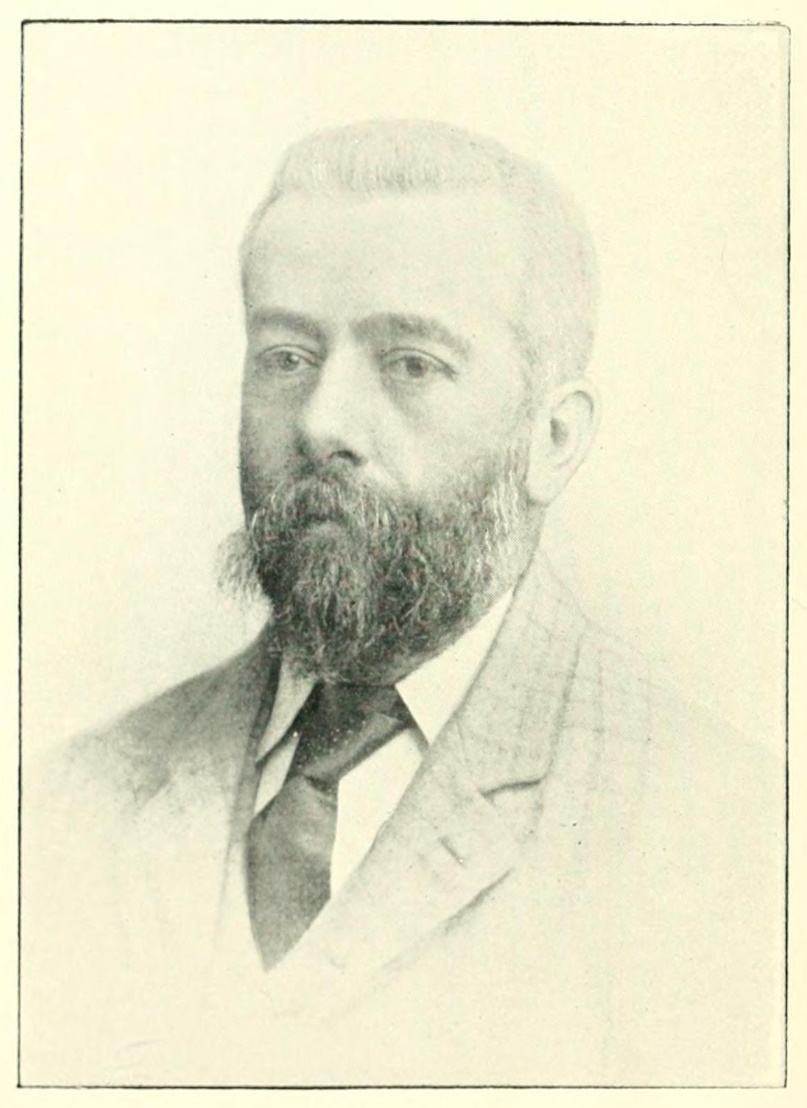
The 'Tory socialist' Maltman Barry, the continued support of whom was detrimental to Champion's influence within the labour movement.

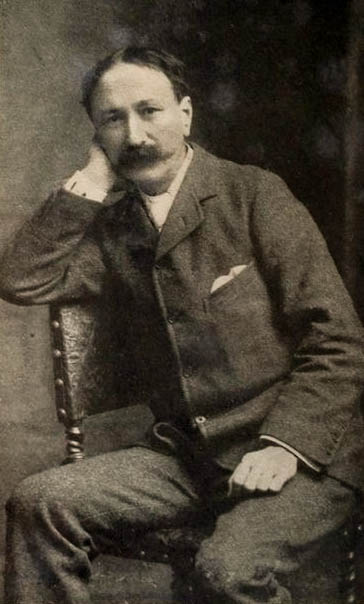
The writer Morley Roberts, Champion's close friend; Champion and Roberts both conducted love affairs with married women.

The Labour Elector in its new incarnation was largely written by Maltman Barry, at first published weekly but in May it became a monthly due to "the continued and serious illness of Mr. Champion, and his resultant inability to contribute to these columns". Barry wrote in the plural in the Labour Elector, "as if he and Champion were of one mind". In the issue of 1 April 1893 he wrote: "We have created the Independent Labour Party and set it on its legs, and we are going to take care that no one (inside of it or outside of it) injures it". On 22 April Barry wrote "we have openly declared our intention to do the work of the Independent Labour Party wherever and whenever the Independent Labour Party is unable or unwilling to do it". These comments were indicative of the attitude that prompted Joseph Burgess in the Workman's Times to make editorial attacks on "The Barry-Champion 'We'" during April and May 1893. The ILP executive began to increasingly view the behaviour of Champion and Barry as irresponsible. The Bradford conference had passed a resolution that "there should be a central electoral fund, with no funds accepted that imposed conditions, including the targeting of funds for particular candidates". Champion's funding of selected candidates and suspicions about the funding sources had caused tensions in the past, and his readiness to continue the practice outside of the central fund set him at odds with the new organisation.

Early in April 1893 Champion spent several weeks in Europe with the writer Morley Roberts, with whom he had developed a close friendship. After their return they shared a house at Kilburn in London and later in the year Champion also took rooms in Aberdeen. In June 1893 the Labour Elector began to use the sub-title "The Organ of the Independent Labour Party", a decision aggressively explained as being "in consequence of the pretensions put forward by ignorant and unprincipled individuals to speak in the name of the Independent Labour Party", followed by comments about "the follies and treasons of these individuals, whether acting singly or under the guise of 'councils' or 'committees'".

In September 1893, under Champion's guidance, the monthly Aberdeen Labour Elector became the weekly Aberdeen Standard, a local newspaper presenting a Labour view. The Labour Elector under Barry's editorship continued to appear, but it was increasingly marginal to the mainstream of Labour politics and "absorbed in self-justification". The Labour Elector finally ceased publication in January 1894.

Adelaide Hogg's sister Annie had died in London in 1892. Adelaide returned to Melbourne by about the end of 1893.

In the lead-up to the second ILP conference at Manchester in early February 1894 Champion recognised that his political ambitions on the national stage had been thwarted. He was being increasingly seen as "an upper-class adventurer, bent on taking over the ILP", and had become steadily more isolated from both the established and emerging labour leaders. At the conference on 2 February an administrative council minute was read to the assembled delegates repudiating both Champion and Barry. In a report in the Workman's Times Joseph Burgess wrote that "the arch-plotters" had been ignored at the conference and that the ILP was now "absolutely pure of Championate taint".

Champion decided to return to Australia, a decision he had made prior to the Manchester conference.

=== Back to Australia ===
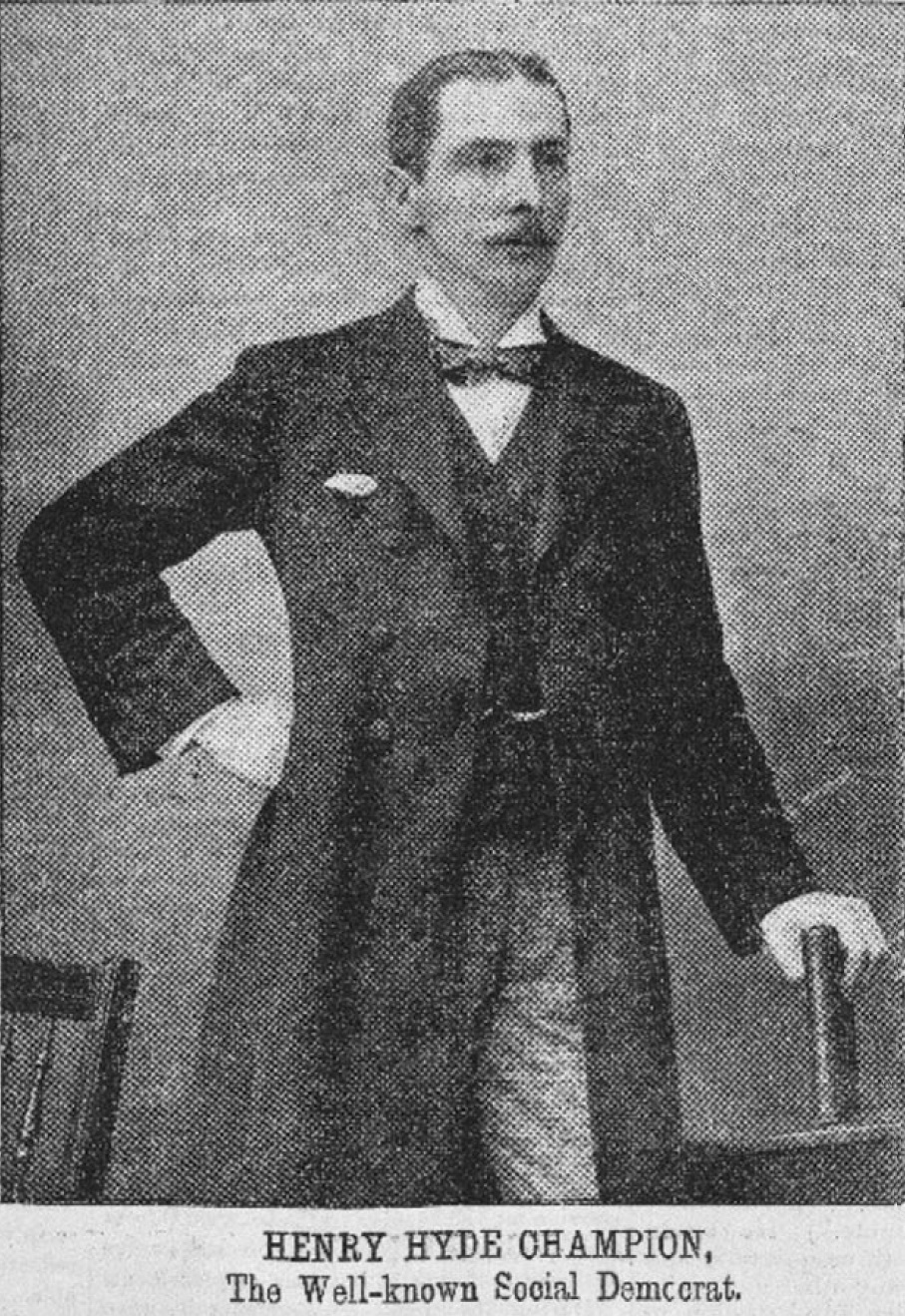
'Henry Hyde Champion, the Well-known Social Democrat', published in Weekly Times (Melbourne), 18 May 1895.

Champion left England aboard the R.M.S. Orient which departed from Plymouth on 24 February 1894 and arrived at Melbourne on 5 April. Morley Roberts' lover, Mrs. Alice Hamlyn, was also a passenger on the vessel. Champion arrived in Australia with "considerable debts and no expectations". He later wrote that in his political endeavours in Britain he had spent "his last farthing and over £5000 entrusted to him by private friends" and likened his arrival in Melbourne in 1894 to that of "a near-penniless migrant".

In Melbourne Champion was employed as a leader writer for The Age newspaper. There remained residual hostility towards Champion in Australia. A columnist in Melbourne Punch commented that "there is much indignation in the Trades Hall camp that Mr. H. H. Champion has presumed to come back to Melbourne", adding that "the old hatred of him survives strongly".

In late-May 1894 Morley Roberts arrived in Melbourne by train from Sydney. Roberts had left Britain in March and travelled to Australia via the United States and across the Pacific by steamer, planning to secretly join his married lover. By this time Champion and Mrs. Hamlyn (and possibly also Champion's lover Adelaide Hogg) were living at Beaconsfield, south-east of Melbourne. Whatever plans the two couples had in mind were disrupted when Roberts received a telegram shortly after his arrival demanding his "instant return to England". After Champion pawned his gold watch and chain to help pay the fares, Roberts and Mrs. Hamlyn departed on 9 June aboard the R.M.S. Oruba, bound for Naples.^{[D]} In August 1894 Adelaide returned to her husband, though Champion later claimed Henry Roughton Hogg was party to an agreement that Adelaide "should see me openly when and where she liked so long as no scandal was created". To what extent, the affair continued after August 1894 is a matter of conjecture, but Champion's private letters reveal only occasional and sometimes fractious meetings. By August 1897 the relationship had come to an end.

Champion mounted a campaign to contest the inner suburban electorate of Albert Park at the September 1894 election in Victoria. He ran on a liberal and protectionist agenda and his meetings were well attended, but he was eliminated as a contender in a pre-poll arbitration process involving two other liberal candidates, in an effort to consolidate the progressive vote against the sitting member.

Champion became involved with the Australian Church, a religious fellowship based on a liberal theology founded by Rev. Dr. Charles Strong. Other members of the church included the family of Jacob and Isabella Goldstein, Alfred Deakin and the poet Bernard O'Dowd. In 1894 Champion began to contribute to Strong's monthly journal the Australian Herald. He joined organisations associated with Dr. Strong and Australian Church members such as the Criminology Society, the Anti-Sweating League and the Co-operative Society. Champion advocated for the formation of a Melbourne branch of the Fabian Society, which had its first meeting in the Australian Church in January 1895. Champion was a member of the Women's Franchise League and in 1895 was elected vice-president of that body. He was active in the National Anti-Sweating League which was formed in July 1895 to investigate working conditions in the clothing, boot-making and other sweatshop industries in Victoria. Although he was generally shunned by trade unions and other working-class organisations, Champion was in demand as a public speaker on a range of political and social topics to middle-class clubs and societies.

From December 1894 to March 1895 a series of dialogues on social questions written by Champion, arranged in sixteen chapters under the title of 'The Root of the Matter: A Social Story', was serialised in Melbourne's The Herald, as well as a number of regional newspapers. In June 1895 the instalments were compiled in book called The Root of the Matter: Being a Series of Dialogues on Social Questions, published by E. W. Cole of Melbourne.

In April 1895 Champion joined the Melbourne May Day Committee as the representative of both the Women's Franchise League and the Melbourne Fabian Society. The Victorian Trades Hall Council had planned to participate in the celebration but withdrew its representation in protest at Champion's role as an organiser. The May Day demonstration was a success and the committee subsequently accepted Champion's proposal to set up a new organisation called the Social-Democratic Federation of Victoria, to which the twenty-three societies represented on the committee could affiliate. When elections for the new body were held in early June, Champion was appointed honorary secretary.

=== Business ventures ===
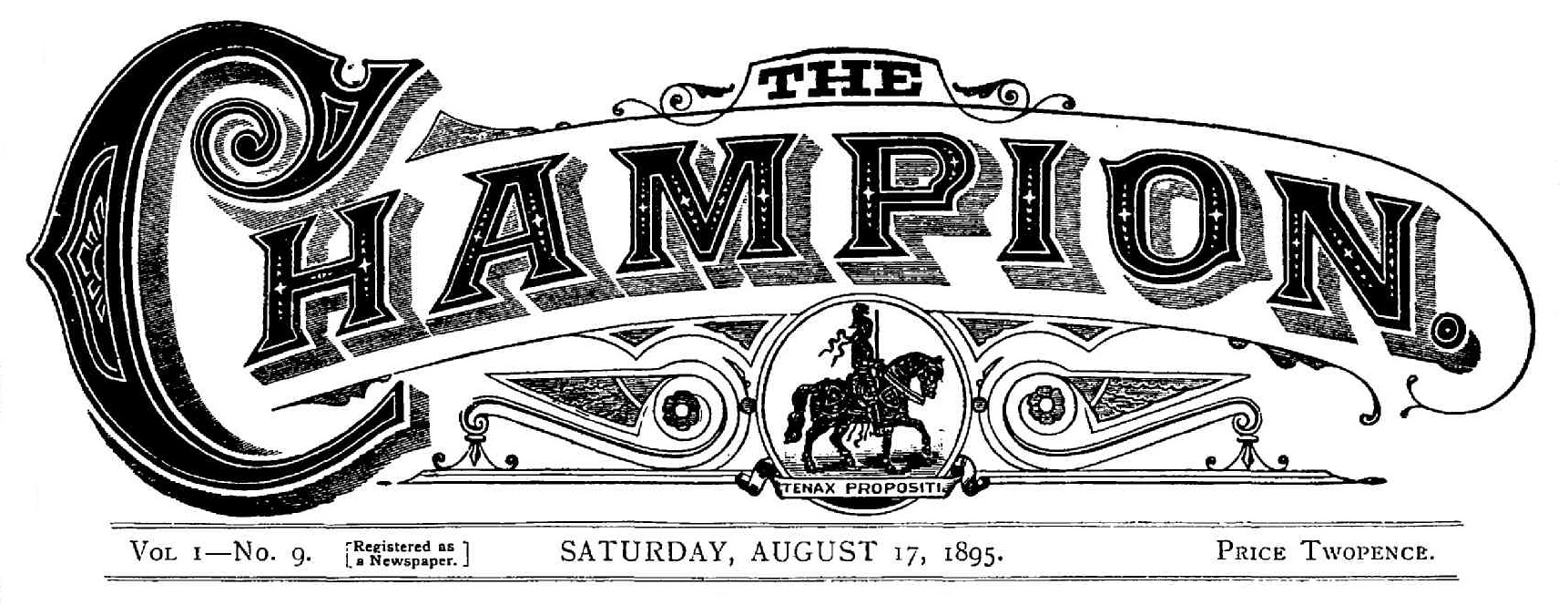
The first iteration of the masthead of The Champion weekly newspaper.

Champion commenced a weekly illustrated newspaper called The Champion, with the first issue being published on 22 June 1895. The Melbourne Punch summed up the enterprise as "H.H. floats himself as a paper, and will sell himself in penny numbers", adding that "the frank egotism of this is enough to take away the breath of a modest man". The funds to start a newspaper had been made possible by the death of Champion's father in early March 1895. Major-General Champion's will had specifically excluded his eldest son from a share of the estate (on the ground that he had "already been sufficiently provided for by me"), but instead Champion was bequeathed a token sum of £500 which he used to set up The Champion. The content of The Champion dealt with a wide range of political, economic, social and cultural issues. One of its most consistent features was its coverage of women's issues, including the support for female suffrage and drawing attention to the discrimination of women in the administration of justice.

In 1896 Champion and Isabella Goldstein established the Book Lover's Library. Champion had experienced frustration with the lending libraries in Melbourne and decided to establish his own book exchange. On 11 April 1896 it was announced in the pages of The Champion that "The Book Lover's Library" would open in Queen's Walk near the newspaper office. A fortnight later the details of the deposit system under which books could be borrowed was advertised, including a list of "new books recently added".

Champion made another attempt to enter the Victorian parliament when the seat of Melbourne South in the Victorian Legislative Assembly became vacant after the death of its member, Joseph Winter, on 2 May 1896. There were four candidates vying for the progressive vote, J. B. Tucker (endorsed by the Trades Hall Council) and three (including Champion) identified with the anti-sweating movement. The election, held on 26 May, was won by Tucker, with Champion only receiving 146 votes.

In 1897 Champion worked with Isabella Goldstein and her daughter Elsie Belle on the committee for the Queen's Shilling Fund, which led to the founding of the Queen Victoria Hospital for Women and Children in Melbourne. The project had been suggested by Champion as a means of commemorating Queen Victoria's Diamond Jubilee. By April 1897 Champion had left his rooms near the newspaper office and became a lodger in the Goldstein family home. The final issue of The Champion was published on 29 May 1897. Champion had purchased The Sun, claiming that "the Champion has absorbed the Sun" (even though the latter name was the one retained). The Sun was essentially a society newspaper, described as "a disseminator of interesting chit-chat about the Very Nicest and professional folk". An article in the Hamilton Spectator about Champion's acquisition expressed doubt that he would be able to convert The Sun "into a political organ" without adversely effecting "its circulation and interest". Champion's ownership of The Sun was the subject of critical comments in left-wing circles. In October 1897 the newly-established socialist weekly The Tocsin described him as "the proprietor of a shoddy society paper, run for the edification of the toffs of Toorak". In February 1899 Champion sold The Sun, at a loss, to Catherine Hay Thomson and Evelyn Gough.

By a gradual process the opposition and hostility towards Champion in unionist left-wing circles began to be tempered. The respected British trade unionist Ben Tillett visited the Australian colonies on several occasions in 1897 and 1898. During a lecture at the Temperance Hall in Melbourne in April 1898 Tillett commented on "the noble self-sacrificing work done by H. H. Champion in connection with the Labour Movement in England". Tillett spoke of Champion's "good work" as editor of the Labour Elector, in particular during the 1889 London dock strike, as well as his work alongside Tom Mann in exposing labour conditions in certain industries and supporting the 'eight hours' movement. The speaker added that "whatever might have happened out here, he could only speak of the man as he found him".

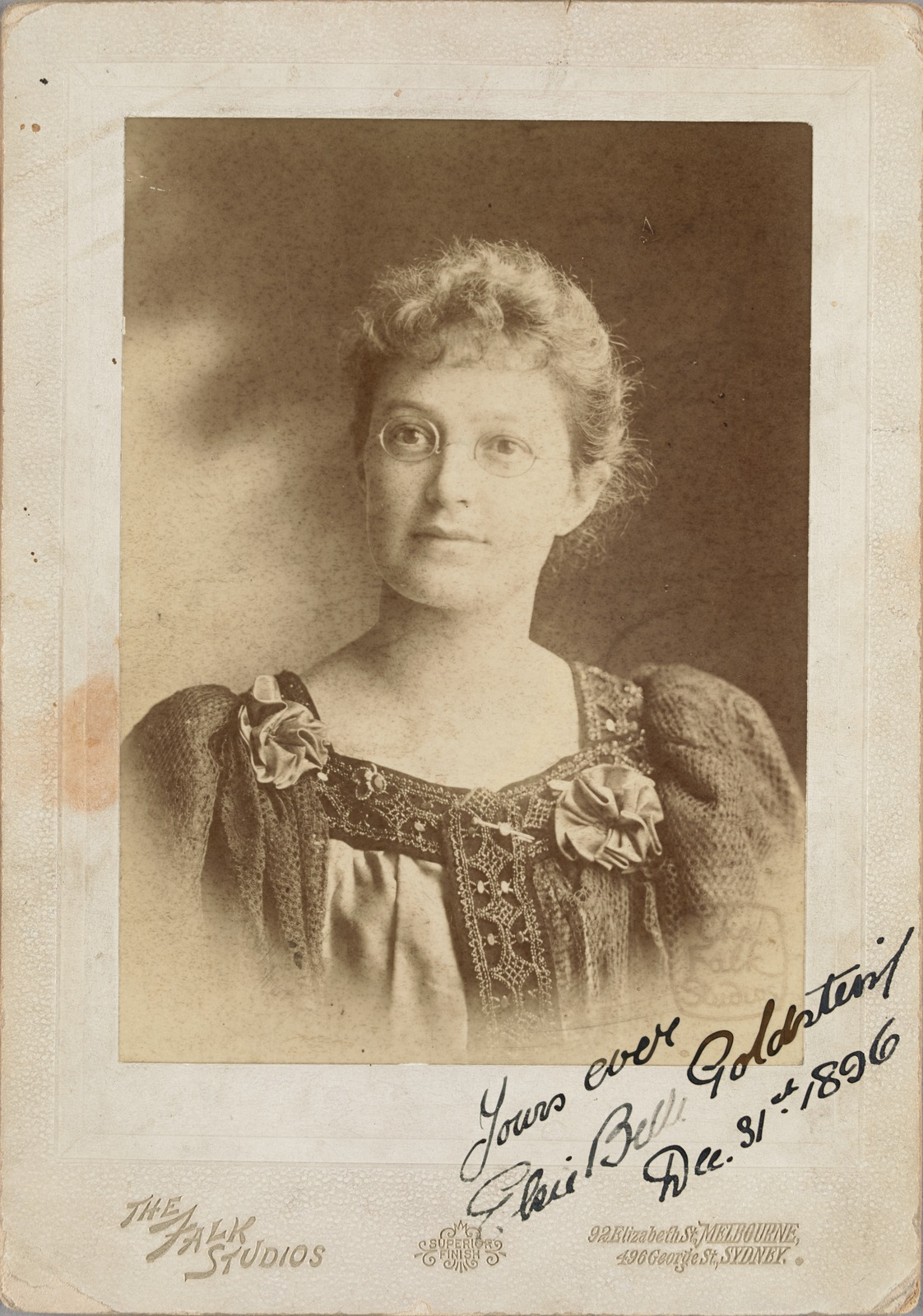
Elsie Belle Goldstein.

On 8 December 1898 Champion married Elsie Belle Goldstein, the daughter of the suffragist and social reformer Isabella Goldstein and sister of Vida Goldstein. His marriage to Elsie Belle has been described as "a happy and enduring one". Champion found his wife to be "a delightful companion with interests which he shared". Elsie Belle "was also a woman of firm character, with a strength on which he came to rely in his declining years". After they were married Elsie Belle took over the day-to-day management of the Book Lover's Library. During the early years of the Book Lover's Library the book exchange was the main business, but the sale of new books became increasingly important. In 1899 the business moved to larger premises in Collins Street, and soon afterwards relocated again to 239 Collins Street, next to the offices of The Age newspaper.

In May 1899 Champion began to publish the Book Lover, the monthly magazine of the Book Lover's Library, incorporating literary reviews and book trade information, as well as casual reminiscences and reflections. Later issues included articles and contributed prose and poetry. Champion's passion for radical socialism was beginning to mellow. In August 1899 he described his previous political activities as being carried out "with more enthusiasm than discretion, who imagined that human stupidity and indifference would not prevent a solution of social problems". The Book Lover was initially begun to support his wife's business but it became Champion's major interest.

At the Victorian general election in October 1900 Champion made another attempt to enter parliament. He stood for the electorate of Albert Park, the same seat in which he had nominated in 1894. Champion ran as a liberal on a protectionist platform against two opponents, the Conservative sitting member John White (described as "a seasoned enemy of the working classes and consistent reactionary on every progressive movement") and Thomas Ashworth, the president of the Victorian Free Trade Association. Champion's reputation in left-wing circles had been rehabilitated to such an extent that he received support from members of the Trades Hall Council and the socialist newspaper The Tocsin. He ran a strong campaign with the strong possibility he might win, despite the Victorian Labor Party opting to support the Conservative candidate in Albert Park (a decision described in The Tocsin as a form of "democratic dementia"). On the eve of the election an anonymous pamphlet was circulated questioning Champion's army career and claiming he had been discharged for disloyalty, a tactic that was particularly effective in the context of the prevailing jingoism aroused by the Boer War. Champion publicly and vigorously denied the charge, and also instigated legal proceedings, but it is likely that the circulation of the "scurrilous leaflets" eroded some of his support.^{[E]} When the poll was declared, Champion came in second, only fifty-one votes behind the sitting member, with the free-trader Ashworth coming a poor third.

=== Victorian Socialist Party ===
After the six Australian colonies federated as the Commonwealth of Australia on 1 January 1901, Champion turned his attention to the first election for the new federal parliament in March. After hearing the Liberal leaders, Deakin and Peacock, speak at South Melbourne he decided that the Liberal Protectionist Party was "a wobbly concern" and decided to join the Labor Party, even though he had previously been critical of the Labor leadership. He submitted his nomination to be the Labor candidate for the South Melbourne electorate, but was too ill to attend the pre-selection meeting (during which his candidature was rejected).

Champion suffered a stroke in 1901, which left him paralysed on his right side. He was bed-ridden for nine months and spent another year convalescing. The stroke left him unable to write with his right hand, but still able to walk with the aid of a stick. During his recovery the Book Lover was maintained by F. W. Maudsley, but Champion had resumed writing most of the publication by the beginning of 1903.

Tom Mann, the socialist trade-unionist and Champion's colleague from the days of the 1889 London dock strike, emigrated to Australia in 1902 and settled in Melbourne. Mann became an organiser for the Labor Party but eventually grew disillusioned with the parliamentary process and resigned from the party. In June 1905 he began a weekly series of lectures on socialism, out of which the Social Questions Committee was formed, with Champion as one of its two vice-presidents. In February 1906 the Social Questions Committee renamed itself the Victorian Socialist Party (VSP).

The new organisation had the stated purpose of engaging in the "systematic propaganda of socialist principles". The VSP held public lectures and meetings and published a newspaper, the Socialist, which was initially edited by Mann. The organisation was envisaged as a "community of socialists", so activities included picnics and social evenings. Champion was active in establishing a Socialist Co-operative Trading Society to sell a variety of household requirements and he was a director of a Socialist Savings Bank. Membership of the VSP was open to Labor Party members and by May 1907 the organisation had two thousand members. The VSP considered its role to be "primarily educational" and resolved to refrain from nominating political candidates, seeking instead to influence the existing Labor Party by supporting candidates "who stand for Socialist principles". In June 1907 Champion became president of the VSP after J. P. Jones resigned before his term had expired. At the annual meeting in September 1907 Champion withdrew his nomination for president, but was elected to the executive. For three months from April 1908 Champion was acting editor of the journal while Mann was in New Zealand.

In October 1908 the general meeting of the VSP voted in favour of running parliamentary candidates, reversing the previously adopted policy. Champion was part of a group head by John Curtin who urged the implementation of political action. At the Victorian state election held in late December 1908 VSP candidates stood against Labor candidates in two inner city electorates. The results were humiliating, with both VSP candidates losing their deposits. The poor results signalled the beginning of the disintegration of the Victorian Socialist Party (culminating in a serious split in 1912). Champion resigned from his executive positions in January 1909, indicating his unwillingness to participate in the ongoing factional disputes over the direction of the Party. Despite his resignation from the executive, Champion remained an active member of the VSP. Prior to the 1911 Victorian election Champion appealed to the VSP to support Labor candidates. He continued to contribute to the Socialist, under his own name, anonymously and under the pseudonym 'Tenax'.

=== The world of books ===
From mid-1906 to 1914 Henry and Elsie Belle Champion lived in an apartment block named 'Whitehall', in Bank Place (off Little Collins Street). With his steadily increasing infirmity, Champion was seen in public less often and his life became less focussed on politics and more on the world of arts and letters. In about 1906 Champion had established the Australasian Authors' Agency to provide a service for authors seeking publication and undertaking the editing and revising of manuscripts. By 1911 Champion began to publish books, mostly titles by new authors, under the imprint of the Australasian Authors' Agency. He had an early success with The Closed Door and Other Verses by Dorothea Mackellar, published in May 1911. The first edition sold out within a month, followed by three other editions within a year.

Another book published in 1911 by Champion was declared to be an obscene publication. The Australasian Authors' Agency had published The Answer by William J. Chidley, "an eccentric but serious-minded reformer" advocating 'the simple life', which included dress reform and a vegetarian diet. Chidley also argued for a different mode of sexual intercourse, by which the flaccid or semi-erect penis was sucked into the vagina (rather than involving the erect penis, which he described as "the crowbar method"). Champion and the bookseller Edward W. Cole were called before a special court in early October 1911 to show cause why copies of the book seized by the police "should not be destroyed". In the end the bench of magistrates declared The Answer to be obscene and ordered that the impounded copies be destroyed.

In 1916 Champion published one of the first personal accounts of the Gallipoli campaign, The Straits Impregnable by 'Sydney de Loghe' (Sydney Loch). The first edition sold quickly and a second edition was published, but the book was subject to censorship and withdrawn from bookshops by order of military authorities. Rising costs associated with wartime and post-war conditions began to affect the viability of Champion's publishing business. The Book Lover was discontinued after the June 1921 issue. In 1922 Champion was declared bankrupt. The Book Lover's Library was unaffected by Champion's financial difficulties as it was owned by his wife Elsie Belle. In the 1920s "Bookshop" was added to the title of the business. The Book Lover's Library and Bookshop became an institution in the cultural life of Melbourne until it was closed in the mid-1930s by Champion's widow.

=== Later years ===
After 1922 Champion's public life became much diminished. His wife handled the couple's business affairs and Champion spent much of his time at their South Yarra home and the nearby Botanical Gardens. Elsie Belle and her sisters were fervent believers of Christian Science, of which the healing power of prayer was a central tenet. Assisted by his wife Champion, with a shuffling gait and slurred speech, attended Christian Science services and occasionally visited the Book Lover's Library.

Champion died on 30 April 1928, aged 69, at his home at 462 Punt Road in South Yarra, after having suffered a stroke twelve hours previously. He was privately cremated on the following day at the Fawkner Crematorium.

== Publications ==
- The Great Dock Strike in London, August, 1889 (1890), London: Swan Sonnenschein & Co.; Melbourne: E. A. Petherick & Co.
- The Root of the Matter: Being a Series of Dialogues on Social Questions (1895), Melbourne: E.W. Cole.

== Notes ==
A.The historian John Barnes, writing in 2005, maintained that the money for the unsuccessful London candidates probably came from Robert William Hudson, the proprietor of Bay Soaps, a capitalist with radical sympathies who supported Champion's activities throughout his political career in Britain. Hudson provided funds in support of John Burns' candidature in the Nottingham West constituency. Burns ended up polling a respectable 598 votes.

B.The historian John Barnes stated that the SDF voted to expel Champion in November 1888.

C.Champion was often described in such terms as wearing "fashionable dress, silk hat" and an "eyeglass". He dressed "like a gentleman, according to the conventional taste of the day, wearing a frock coat and a top hat on public occasions", though he was never known to wear an eye-glass. In later years he wore spectacles of the pince-nez type.

D.Morley Roberts and Mrs. Alice ('Glory') Hamlyn (née Selous) travelled to Naples "as man and wife", but afterwards they lived apart. The couple married in 1896 after the death of Alice's husband Snowden Thomas Hamlyn.

E.The author of the anonymous pamphlet was revealed to be Max Hirsch, a proponent of free-trade and a single-tax. By mid-December 1900 Champion issued a writ claiming damages for libel against Hirsch. The matter was listed for a hearing, but postponed on a number of occasions until by early June it was reported that the matter had been "quietly settled". Champion later claimed that Hirsch was "forced to apologise and pay the lawyer's expenses".

Party political offices
| Preceded by Alfred Winks | Secretary of the Social Democratic Federation; 1883–1885 | Succeeded by Henry W. Lee |
