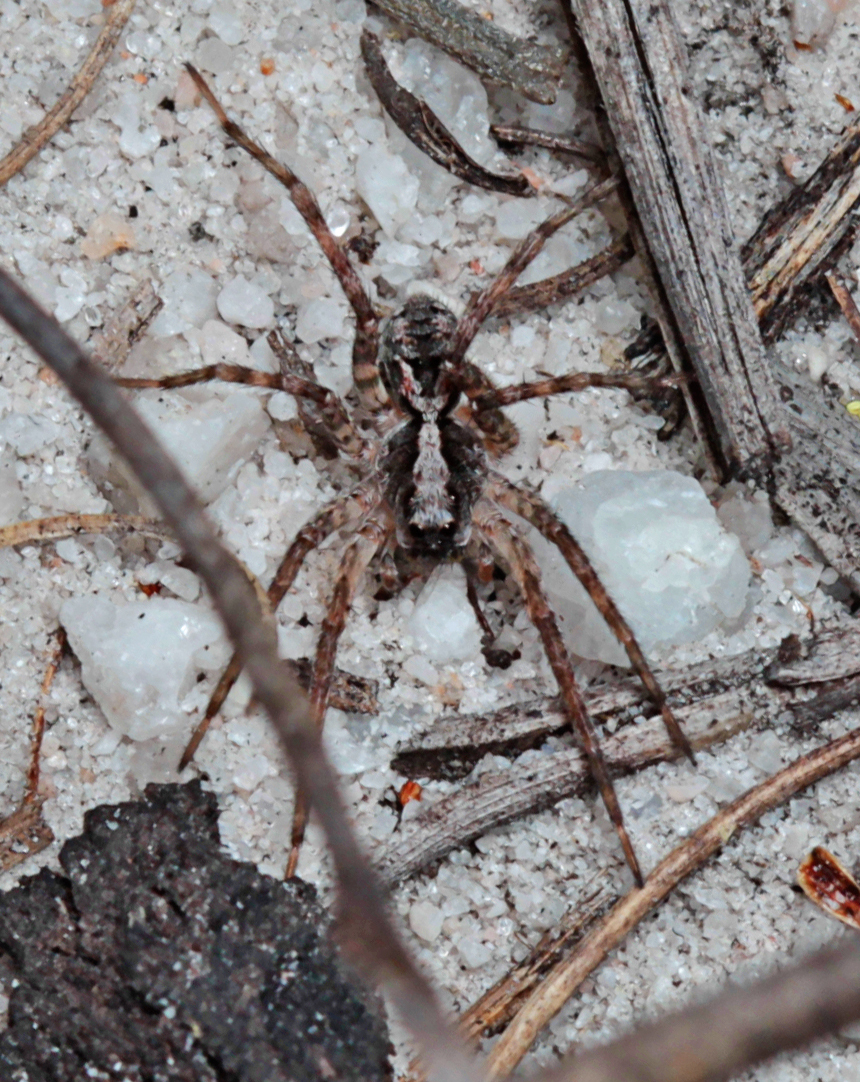
- Venator spenceri

Scientific classification
- Kingdom: Animalia
- Phylum: Arthropoda
- Subphylum: Chelicerata
- Class: Arachnida
- Order: Araneae
- Infraorder: Araneomorphae
- Family: Lycosidae
- Genus: Venator; Hogg, 1900

Type species
- V. spenceri Hogg, 1900

Species
- V. immansuetus (Simon, 1909) — Australia (Western Australia); V. marginatus Hogg, 1900 — Australia (New South Wales, Victoria); V. spenceri Hogg, 1900 — Australia (Queensland, South Australia, New South Wales, Victoria)

= Venator (spider) =

Genus of spiders

Venator is a genus of Australian wolf spiders first described by Henry Roughton Hogg in 1900. As of April 2019 it contains only three species.
