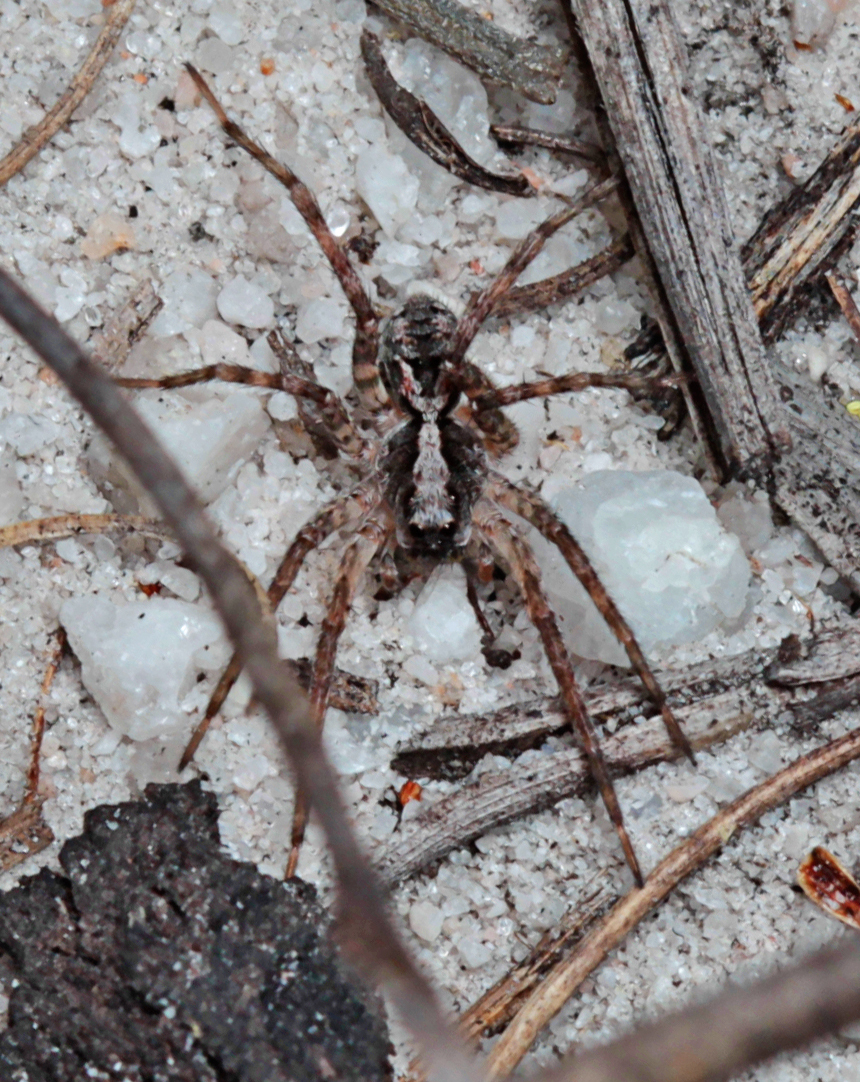
- Juvenile Venator spenceri

Scientific classification
- Kingdom: Animalia
- Phylum: Arthropoda
- Subphylum: Chelicerata
- Class: Arachnida
- Order: Araneae
- Infraorder: Araneomorphae
- Family: Lycosidae
- Genus: Venator
- Species: V. spenceri

Binomial name
- Venator spenceri Hogg, 1900

= Venator spenceri =

Species of spider

Venator spenceri is a wolf spider (i.e., in the Lycosidae family), endemic to Australia and found in Queensland, New South Wales, Victoria, and South Australia.

It was described in 1900 by Henry Roughton Hogg. Spiders of the genus Venator, including V. spenceri, are medium-sized wolf spiders with body lengths ranging from 9 to 22 millimeters. They typically exhibit a brownish coloration and possess a distinctive black patch covering the anterior three-quarters of the ventral surface. Venator spenceri can be distinguished from other wolf spiders by genitalic features. Females have an elevated atrium on the epigyne that forms a raised edge bordering an inverted T-shaped median septum. In males, the tegular apophysis of the pedipalp often features a retrolateral incision that corresponds to the edge on the female epigyne.

This species is part of the Bassian fauna and is distributed in southeastern Australia, with confirmed presence in Queensland, New South Wales, Victoria, and South Australia.[1][2] V. spenceri is typically found in dry sclerophyll forests, reflecting its adaptation to temperate woodland environments.
