= Jack Williams (socialist activist) =

British activist (c. 1854 – 1917)

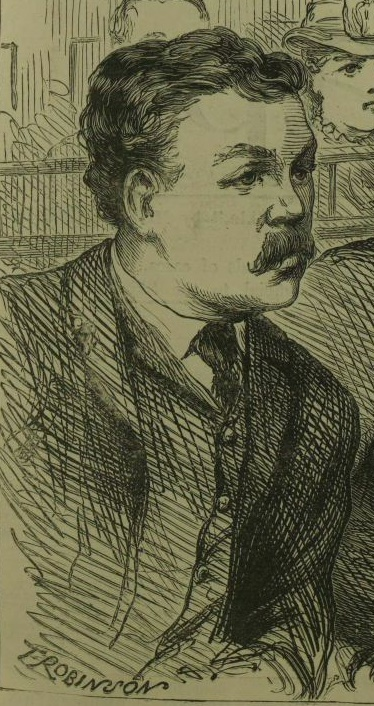
- Williams in court in 1886
- Born: John Edward Williams c. 1854; Holloway, England
- Died: 4 November 1917
- Resting place: Walthamstow, England
- Occupation: Activist
- Political party: Social Democratic Federation

John Edward Williams (c. 1854 – 1917) was a British socialist activist.

Born in Holloway, north of London, Williams grew up in various workhouses. In the early 1870s, he became very active in the Irish nationalist movement, and became known for his anti-capitalism. This led him to join the Rose Street Club. Then he was a founding member of the Democratic Federation, later renamed the Social Democratic Federation (SDF).

Within the SDF, Williams was a prominent supporter of its leader, H. M. Hyndman. He campaigned for free speech and, as a result, was twice imprisoned. At the 1885 general election, he stood for the party in Hampstead, but took only 27 votes. It was later revealed that the SDF candidacies at the election had been paid for by Maltman Barry, a Conservative Party agent who hoped they would split the "progressive" vote.

Williams was elected to the executive council of the SDF on several occasions (in 1884, 1895, and 1896), but devoted much of his time to organising unemployed workers and making speeches on street corners. He was also a supporter of the new unionism, but struggled to find work and so was not centrally involved in the trade union movement.

Williams stood for parliament a second time at the 1906 general election in Northampton. He took 11.7 per cent of the votes cast, but was not elected. He retired in 1912. His health deteriorated, in part due to his earlier prison sentences, and he died in 1917.

== See also ==
- Irish National Land League
