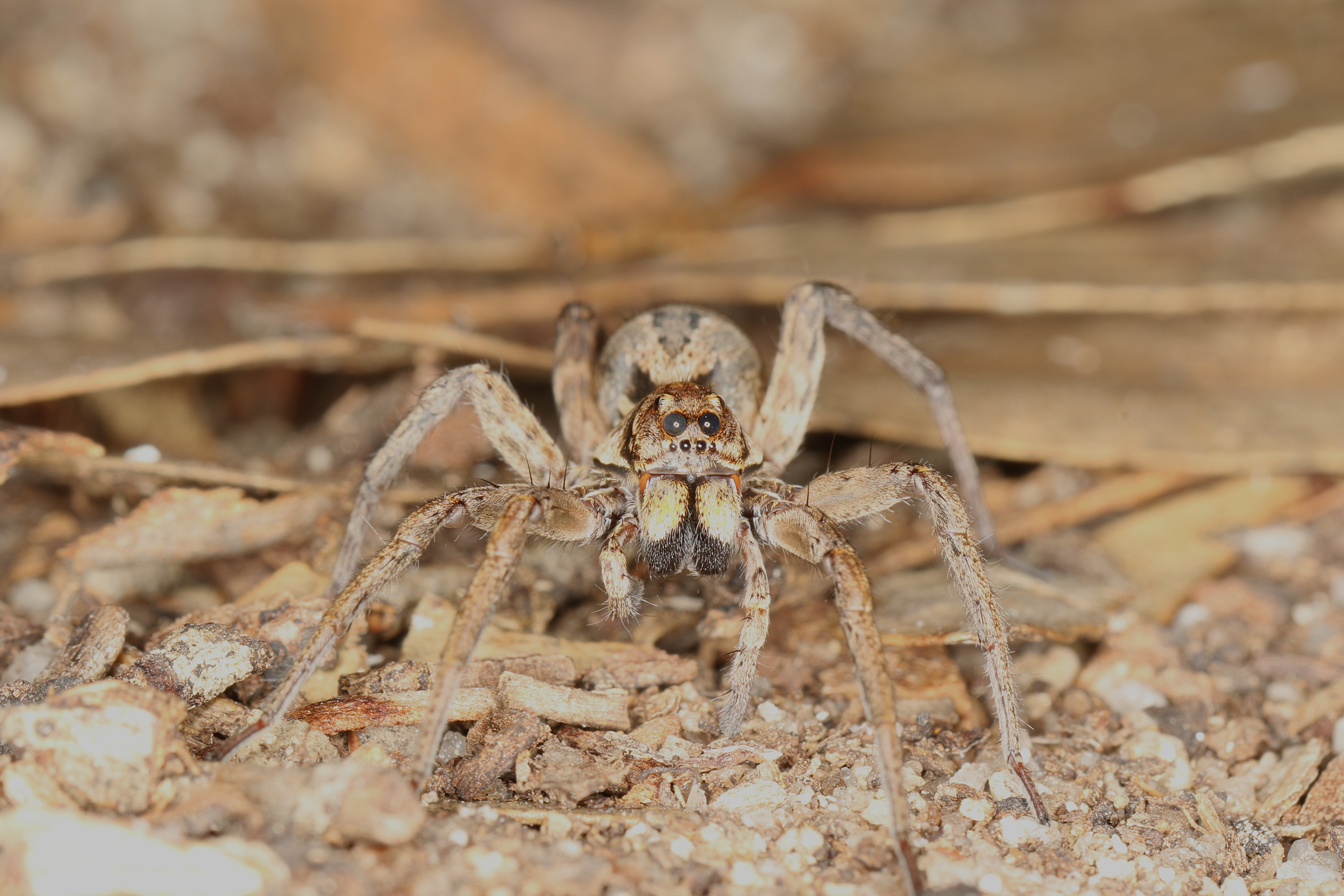

Scientific classification
- Kingdom: Animalia
- Phylum: Arthropoda
- Subphylum: Chelicerata
- Class: Arachnida
- Order: Araneae
- Infraorder: Araneomorphae
- Family: Lycosidae
- Genus: Venator
- Species: V. immansuetus

Binomial name
- Venator immansuetus (Simon, 1909)

= Venator immansuetus =

Species of spider

Venator immansuetus is a wolf spider (i.e., in the Lycosidae family), endemic to Australia and found in the south-west of Western Australia.

It was first described in 1909 by Eugène Simon as Lycosa immansueta, and transferred to the genus, Venator by Volker Framenau in 2015.
