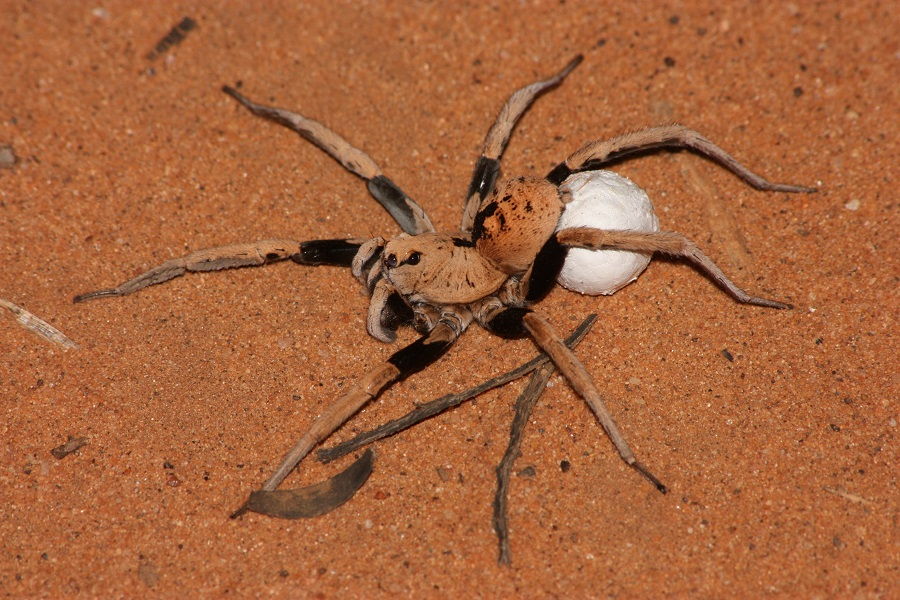
- H. forresti

Scientific classification
- Kingdom: Animalia
- Phylum: Arthropoda
- Subphylum: Chelicerata
- Class: Arachnida
- Order: Araneae
- Infraorder: Araneomorphae
- Family: Lycosidae
- Genus: Hoggicosa; Roewer

Species
- 10, see text

= Hoggicosa =

Genus of spiders

Hoggicosa is a genus of wolf spiders first described by Carl Friedrich Roewer in 1960. The name is a reference to arachnologist Henry Roughton Hogg.

== Species ==
As of February 2024, it contains ten species, all from Australia:

- Hoggicosa alfi Langlands & Framenau, 2010
- Hoggicosa bicolor (Hogg, 1906)
- Hoggicosa brennani Langlands & Framenau, 2010
- Hoggicosa castanea (Hogg, 1906)
- Hoggicosa duracki (McKay, 1975)
- Hoggicosa forresti (McKay, 1973)
- Hoggicosa natashae Langlands & Framenau, 2010
- Hoggicosa snelli (McKay, 1975)
- Hoggicosa storri (McKay, 1973)
- Hoggicosa wolodymyri Langlands & Framenau, 2010
