= Manhood Suffrage League =

Socialist organization

- Secretary: William Morgan (1874–1875); Frank Kitz (1875–1877); Maltman Barry (1877–1878)
- Founded: 1874
- Dissolved: June 7, 1881
- Preceded by: Reform League
- Succeeded by: Democratic Federation
- Ideology: Ultra-radicalism; Later: Socialism
- Political position: Left-wing

The Manhood Suffrage League was a nineteenth-century ultra-radical and, later, socialist club.

The organisation was founded in 1874 as the Democratic and Trades Alliance Association. Most of its initial members were tailors or shoemakers based in Soho, many had been active Chartists and, later, supporters of James Bronterre O'Brien, and almost all were active in the First International. They included Maltman Barry, Johann Eccarius, Robert Gammage, John Bedford Leno, Charles Murray, James Murray, John Rogers, William Townshend and Henry Travis.

In 1875, the club renamed itself as the "Manhood Suffrage League", taking its name from the northern section of the Reform League. Around this time, Frank Kitz came into contact with the group.

In 1877, Maltman Barry, by then the club's secretary, became an outspoken supporter of the Tory campaign to intervene in the Russo-Turkish War. Much of the group objected to this, and the organisation ceased to function by the end of the year. However, it subsequently revived, and by the early 1880s, it had become more interested in socialism. The group became influential in the Marylebone Central Democratic Association and the Social and Political Education League. League members Murray, J. D. Butler and James MacDonald all subsequently became leading figures in the Social Democratic Federation.
