= Charles Murray (trade unionist) =

Charles Murray (died 1889) was a British trade unionist and socialist activist.

Murray worked as a boot closer. He became a socialist, and knew both Feargus O'Connor and Robert Owen. He joined the National Charter Association in 1852, within which he was known as a supporter of Bronterre O'Brien. He was also a leading figure in the Association for Promoting the Repeal of the Taxes on Knowledge.

In the 1860s, Murray was prominent in West End Boot Closers' Union, and in 1862 and 1863, he represented it on the executive of the London Trades Council.

In the 1870s, Murray was a member of the Manhood Suffrage League, and he subsequently became an early member of the Social Democratic Federation.
