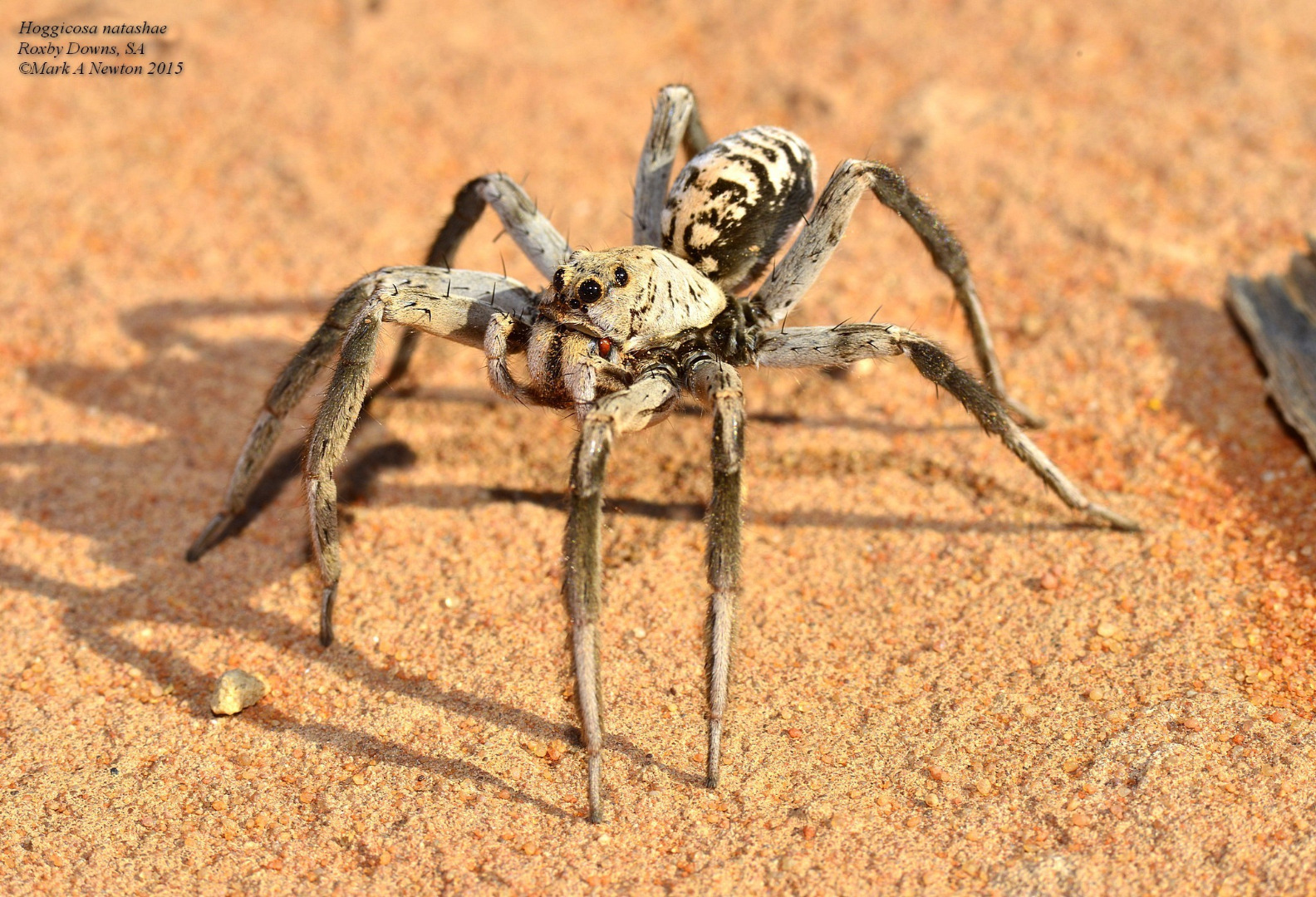

Scientific classification
- Kingdom: Animalia
- Phylum: Arthropoda
- Subphylum: Chelicerata
- Class: Arachnida
- Order: Araneae
- Infraorder: Araneomorphae
- Family: Lycosidae
- Genus: Hoggicosa
- Species: H. natashae

Binomial name
- Hoggicosa natashae Langlands & Fraumenau, 2010.

= Hoggicosa natashae =

Species of spider

Hoggicosa natashae, commonly known as the giant white tiger wolf spider and Natasha's wolfspider, is a species of wolf spider (family Lycosidae) endemic to Australia. This species was first described in 2010 by arachnologists Peter R. Langlands and Volker W. Framenau.

== Description ==
Hoggicosa natashae is one of the largest wolf spiders, with females reaching body lengths of up to 35 mm (1.4 in) and leg spans around 80 mm (3.1 in). The spider has distinctive black transverse markings on a pale cream abdomen. Juveniles display a rich tan colour with faint swirling patterns, which become less prominent as they mature. Only the female has been described in detail, characterized by a larger epigynum with anterior pockets significantly larger than those in other species of the same genus.

== Taxonomy ==
The genus Hoggicosa was first described by Carl Friedrich Roewer in 1960. The systematic revision that included H. natashae also reviewed the Australian 'bicolor' group of wolf spiders. The species was named in honour of Natasha Langlands, the mother of the senior author.

== Habitat and distribution ==
This species inhabits arid regions of central South Australia, New South Wales, and Queensland, specifically found within the Broken Hill Complex (BHC), Channel Country (CHC), Gawler (GAW), and Simpson Strzelecki Dunefields (SSD) IBRA areas. It prefers low sandy depressions with vegetation, such as chenopods and samphire. The spiders construct burrows in sandy clay soils, often with a medium-thickness lid for protection.

== Ecology and behaviour ==
Hoggicosa natashae, like other wolf spiders, is a robust and agile hunter. It primarily preys on insects and other small arthropods, relying on its speed and strength to catch prey rather than using a web.

The reproductive behaviour of Hoggicosa natashae has not been extensively detailed, but it is likely similar to other wolf spiders, where the female carries the egg sac attached to her spinnerets until the spiderlings hatch. The spiderlings then ride on the mother's back for a brief period after hatching.

The species is primarily nocturnal and uses its burrow as a retreat during the day. The burrow, typically with a medium-thickness lid, provides protection from predators and environmental conditions. The spiders are known for their burrowing behaviour, constructing retreats in sandy clay soils.
