= Isabella Goldstein =

Australian suffragist and social reformer(1849-1916)

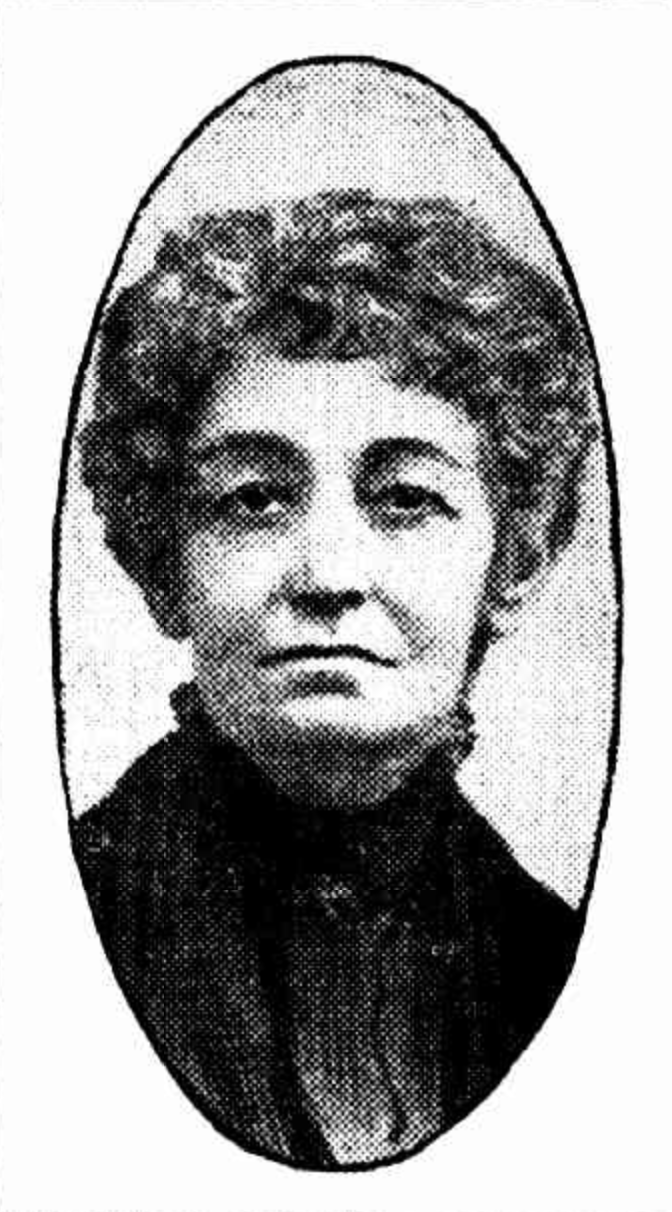
- Born: Isabella Hawkins; 31 December 1849; Portland, Victoria, Australia
- Died: 12 January 1916 (aged 66); South Yarra, Melbourne Victoria
- Occupations: Suffragist, social reformer
- Known for: Victorian Women's Suffrage Petition to the Victorian Parliament, Anti-Sweating League, social work in Collingwood, support for Queen Victoria Hospital for Women and Children

Isabella Goldstein (born Isabella Hawkins) (31 December 1849 – 12 January 1916) lived in Victoria, Australia, was an Australian suffragist and social reformer, one of the organisers of the Victorian Women's Suffrage Petition ("Monster petition") to the Victorian state parliament and the mother of Vida Goldstein.

== Personal life ==
Isabella Hawkins was born on the family's property "Cashmere" in Portland, Victoria, the eldest daughter of Scottish-born squatter Samuel Proudfoot Hawkins and his first wife, Jeanie Hutcheson. She was named after her maternal grandmother, Isabella Hutcheson (Taylor) and followed by six other children. The family moved to another property, "Melville Forest", and were comparatively wealthy. It is reported that, even as a child, Isabella noticed the inequalities between the farmhands' and shepherds' living conditions and her family's homestead. Samuel Hawkins had episodes of mental illness and alcoholism. Isabella's mother died in July 1864. Samuel employed a governess, Mary Anne Adamson, whom he later married in August 1865. In April 1867, when Isabella was 17, her father died. Isabella lived at Melville Forest until her marriage a year later and received an equal share of her father's estate.

On 3 June 1868, at 18 years old, Isabella married Irish born Lieutenant Colonel Jacob Robert Yannasch Goldstein (10 March 1839 – 21 September 1910) then became known as Isabella Goldstein. The couple had five children (four daughters and one son): Vida, Lina, Elsie Belle, Aileen and Selwyn. The first and most famous child, Vida, was born in Portland in April 1869. The family lived in Portland, Warrnambool, Malvern, St Kilda, Melbourne city and South Yarra, Victoria. Although Jacob was also involved in social reform and encouraged independence in his daughters, he was anti-suffrage and became estranged from Isabella later in life. After Jacob died in 1910, Isabella built her own house in South Yarra.

== Faith and social reform ==
Goldstein is reported as having a deep Christian faith and commitment to social reform which she instilled in her daughter, Vida, "Isabella was a Presbyterian and Jacob a Unitarian…. While helping the less fortunate is part of a Christian's duty, and many middle-class people made a hobby of it, Isabella and Jacob were genuinely compassionate and motivated by a fundamental sense of justice and equality." The family attended Scots Church and later the Australian Church where Dr Charles Strong encouraged a deep involvement in social welfare work. Jacob and Isabella were involved in the Charity Organisation Society for many years from 1887. At a charity conference in 1897, Jacob read a paper written by Isabella, "United and Systematic Charity" in which she argued that scientific principles should be applied to preventing poverty, charity from all sources should be coordinated and work should be found for poor families rather than just giving them temporary relief. Jacob later became the honorary superintendent of the Leongatha Labour Colony from 1892.

Isabella Goldstein was an early feminist and suffragist and co-founded the United Council for Woman Suffrage. She was a member with Annette Bear-Crawford of the Victorian Women’s Suffrage Society, formed on 22 June 1884 with Henrietta Dugdale as president. Isabella brought up her more famous daughter, Vida, as a feminist and suffragist and involved Vida in the collection of signatures for the Women's Suffrage Petition.

Goldstein took particular care of the families in the slums of Collingwood, accompanying Strong on visits to Collingwood in 1891 and talking with women who did sweatshop work at home. Later in 1892, Strong and Goldstein distributed tickets for meat and potatoes to hundreds of families in Collingwood and in 1893 she held a cake fair and musical program at her home in East St Kilda to raise funds for Collingwood's neglected children and involved her daughters in a jumble sale in Collingwood Town Hall to benefit the Australian Church Social Improvement Children's Aid and Friendly Help Society She helped establish the Collingwood crèche where widows and deserted wives could send their infants during the day to be washed and fed and cared for, while the mothers worked. She was a committee member of the National Anti-Sweating League, which first met in July 1895 and campaigned for changes to labour laws to provide a minimum wage and limitation to working hours for women and men working in factories as well as women who took in piecemeal work at home. Her son-in-law, Henry Hyde Champion, was also on the committee as well as Dr Strong.

With Annette Bear-Crawford, she helped with the Queen Victoria Shilling Fund to found the Queen Victoria Hospital. "The Queen's Jubilee Celebration in Victoria was made the occasion to appeal for funds for women throughout Victoria to establish a women's hospital staffed by women doctors ... Miss Bear suggested the idea to a small group - Dr C Stone, Mrs I Goldstein, Vida and H H Champion, in Mrs Goldstein's home." Goldstein also helped introduce female factory inspectors, women members on the Benevolent Asylum Committee, and women on School Board Committees.

Later in the 1890s, Isabella and Vida became Christian Scientists. In those later years, Isabella focussed on her Christian Science work, supported Vida in her causes and helped her daughter, Elsie, and her husband, Henry Hyde Champion (who was partly paralysed after a stroke in 1901). Isabella helped Champion and Elsie Belle open the Book Lovers' Library in 1896, which Elsie mainly managed and employed mostly women.

== Death and legacy ==
Goldstein died at her South Yarra home on 12 January 1916, where she lived with her daughter, Vida. Goldstein's legacy was as a suffragist and feminist mentor to her daughters Vida and Elsie as well as her commitment to social reform. Her legacy is summarised well in her obituaries:

She was among the little band of pioneers that made the way easier for other women social welfare workers. She fought in the days when progressive women's views were not received with the kindly consideration awaiting them today...These early battles against public opinion in which Mrs Goldstein figured have given encouragement to others, and stimulated the desire to go forward...In all social and industrial questions she took a keen interest, and was in the van of the social service workers who fought the sweating evil many years ago. Later she became interested in the unemployed problem, and in one particular period of distress spent all her time in the poorer quarters of the city investigating urgent cases and securing assistance. With Dr. Charles Strong and Mrs. Strong she was associated in various points of social service, and was one of the founders of Queen Victoria Hospital for Women and Children, which is staffed entirely by women doctors.

The whole woman movement shares the bereavement of the Goldstein family, for Mrs. Goldstein prepared the way for us, when the fight was much harder than it is to-day. Few people appreciate the struggle of those pioneers, who were ridiculed and abused for their efforts on behalf of womanhood and humanity, because we have entered so easily into the heritage they won for us. Mrs. Goldstein was one of the earliest workers for the franchise for women in Australia, and for that alone we owe her an everlasting debt of gratitude, for she began the great movement when it was "unwomanly" even to think of belonging to the "shrieking sisterhood" of which all Australian women are now members! Mrs. Goldstein's heart was always warm to the sufferings of the poor, and she had a wide grasp of the social questions of her time...She was the heart and soul of the anti-sweating movement, and the women workers owe much of their emancipation from their worst conditions to her.
