= Maltman Barry =

Scottish political activist

M. Maltman Barry (Barrie)
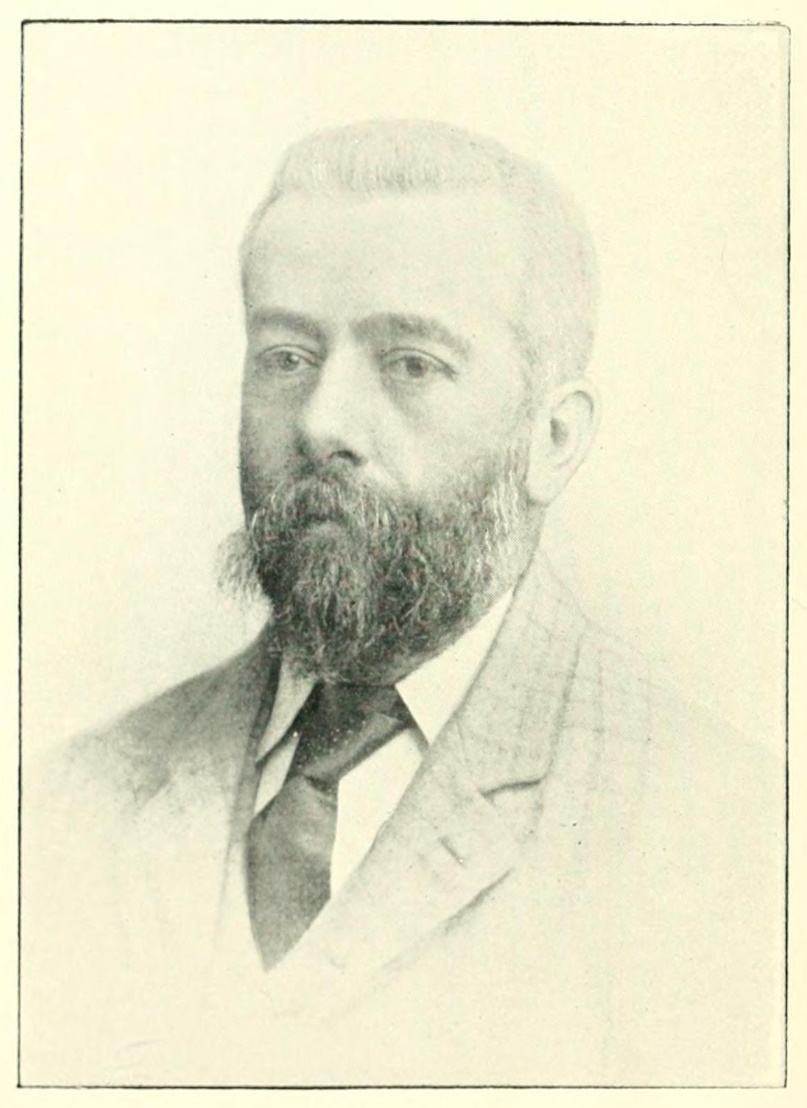
- Photographic portrait of Maltman Barry.
- Born: Michael Maltman Barry; 1842; Glasgow, Scotland
- Died: 5 April 1909 (aged 66–67); Dulwich, South London
- Occupations: Political activist, writer, journalist

Michael Maltman Barry (1842 – 5 April 1909), often known as Maltman Barry, was a Scottish political activist who described himself as a Marxist but stood in elections for the Conservative Party.

== Biography ==
Barry was born in Glasgow and moved to London in 1864 to work as a journalist at The Standard, where he reported on parliamentary and labour matters. He became a friend and supporter of Karl Marx, who impressed him with his opposition to the Liberal Party, and thereafter described himself as a Marxist.

In 1871, Barry was appointed as Provisional Chairman of the International Working Men's Association but, after a year, he was compelled to leave the organisation for being too moderate and labelled a possible spy. Despite this, he continued to be active in radical circles, and became the secretary of the Manhood Suffrage League. He became an outspoken supporter of the Tory campaign to intervene in the Russo-Turkish War of 1877–1878. Much of the group objected to this, and the organisation ceased to function by the end of the year. He launched the National Society for the Resistance of Russian Aggression and the Protection of British Interests in the East. Many of its early meetings led to riots, but Barry continued to campaign against Russia into the 1890s.

This experience led Barry to become a supporter of the Conservative Party, but he also worked with Henry Hyde Champion to call for an independent party of workers. At the 1880 general election, Barry unsuccessfully sought the Conservative nomination in Dundee, where he acclaimed the Tory's support for the Factory Acts and also the party's imperial policy.

The Conservative Central Office gave Barry £340 to pass to H. M. Hyndman of the Social Democratic Federation (SDF) in order to fund two of its candidates in the 1885 general election, in the hope that they would defeat Liberal Party MPs. This "Tory gold" was not successful, and led SDF members, including Ramsay MacDonald and James MacDonald, to set up the rival Socialist Union.

Barry changed the spelling of his name to Michael Maltman Barrie, in order for it to appear more Scottish. He worked with Champion to set up an anti-liberal labour alliance in Aberdeen, and published The Labour Elector newspaper from 1888 to 1890 and 1893 to 1894, supporting the Independent Labour Party and campaigning against Jewish immigration.

At the 1892 general election, he stood unsuccessfully as the Conservative candidate in Banffshire, then Morpeth in 1895 and 1900 and North Aberdeen in 1906.

Party political offices
Preceded by Frank Kitz	Secretary of the Manhood Suffrage League; 1877–1878	Succeeded by ?
