= Henry Roughton Hogg =

British arachnologist (1846–1923)

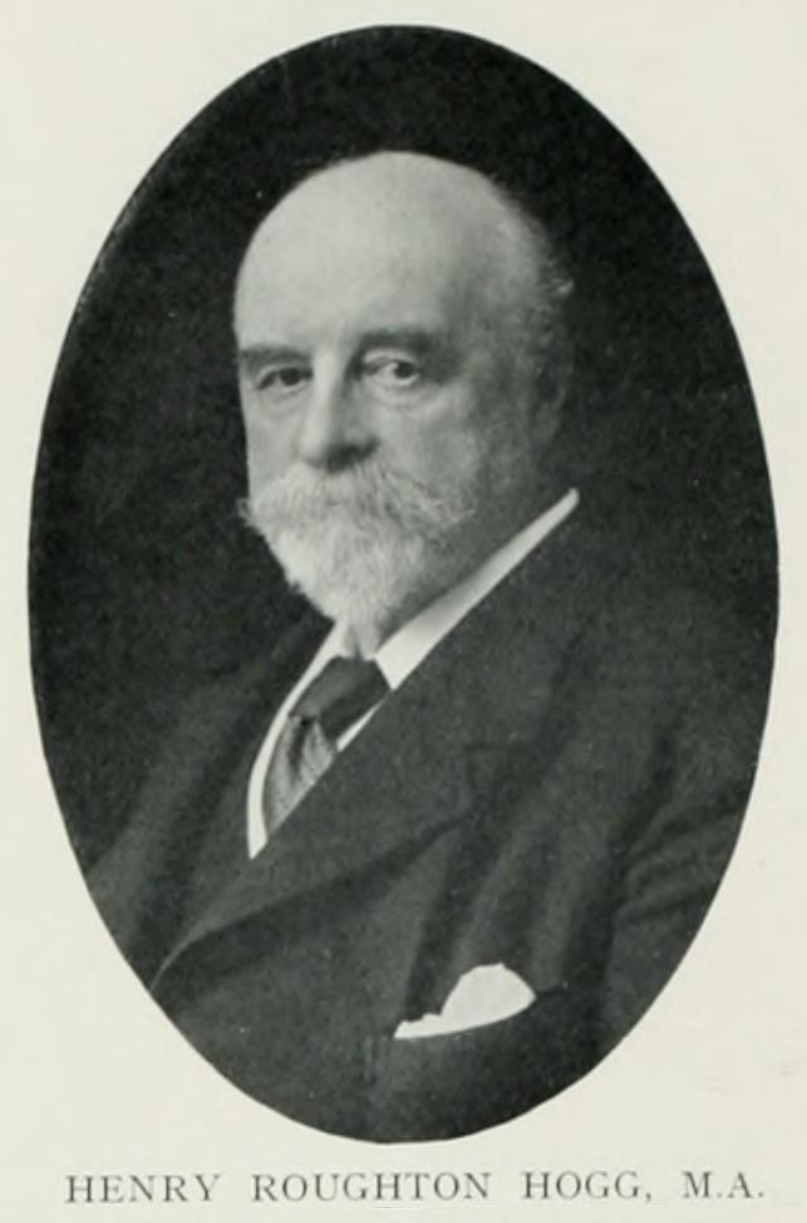
- Henry Roughton Hogg in later life
- Born: Henry Roughton Hogg; 9 February 1846; Stockwell, south-west London, county Surrey
- Died: 30 November 1923 (aged 77); Kensington, London
- Occupations: Arachnologist, businessman
- Spouse: Adelaide Lashbrooke Elder

Henry Roughton Hogg (9 February 1846 – 30 November 1923) was a British amateur arachnologist and businessman who lived in both Australia and Britain.

Hogg emigrated to Australia in December 1873 and co-founded a mercantile and shipping agency in Melbourne, becoming a prominent member of the business community. He joined the Field Naturalists' Club and the Royal Society of Victoria and acquired a specialist knowledge of the spiders of Australia and New Zealand. Hogg was given access to specimens of spiders collected by the 1894 Horn scientific expedition to central Australia and contributed the section on spiders in the published results of the expedition.

Hogg and his wife returned to England in August 1900. He continued to study spiders and contributed regular articles to the Proceedings of the Zoological Society of London and other publications and scientific journals, often providing the first descriptions of new species. His earlier papers dealt with the spiders of Australasia, but he also authored descriptions of spiders from other regions of the world.

== Biography ==
=== Early life ===
Henry Roughton Hogg was born in Stockwell, county Surrey, on 9 February 1846, the son of Francis Henry Hogg and Frances (née Robinson). He attended Uppingham School in the period 1859 to 1862. Hogg studied at Christ's College at Cambridge University and was awarded a Bachelor of Arts in 1868 (after completing the Mathematical Tripos) and a Masters of Arts in 1873. After graduating he commenced his commercial career in the family firm of Hogg and Robinson, merchant insurance agents.^{[A]}

=== Australia ===
Hogg visited Australia from about mid-1871 to February 1872. During that period he travelled extensively between the colonies of south-east Australia. He visited Melbourne, Sydney, Adelaide and Launceston, travelling by intercolonial steamers. Hogg returned to England aboard the R.M.S. Baroda which departed from Sydney on 26 February 1872.

Henry R. Hogg returned to Australia on a more permanent basis in mid-December 1873, arriving at Melbourne from Bombay aboard the passenger steamer R.M.S.S. Nubia. By March 1874 he and Augustus Frederick Robinson had formed the firm of Hogg, Robinson and Co. Pty. Ltd., mercantile and shipping agents, in Melbourne. The company acted as an agent for the Indemnity Mutual Marine Assurance Co. Ltd. of London. By May 1874 Hogg had been appointed as a director of the Adelaide Marine and Fire Assurance Company, based in Melbourne.

Hogg was a keen sportsman and was involved in cricket in Melbourne. Soon after his arrival in Melbourne he became a member of the Melbourne Cricket Club and later served as an honorary auditor for the club. Hogg played for the Bohemian Cricket Club, which was formed in 1875.

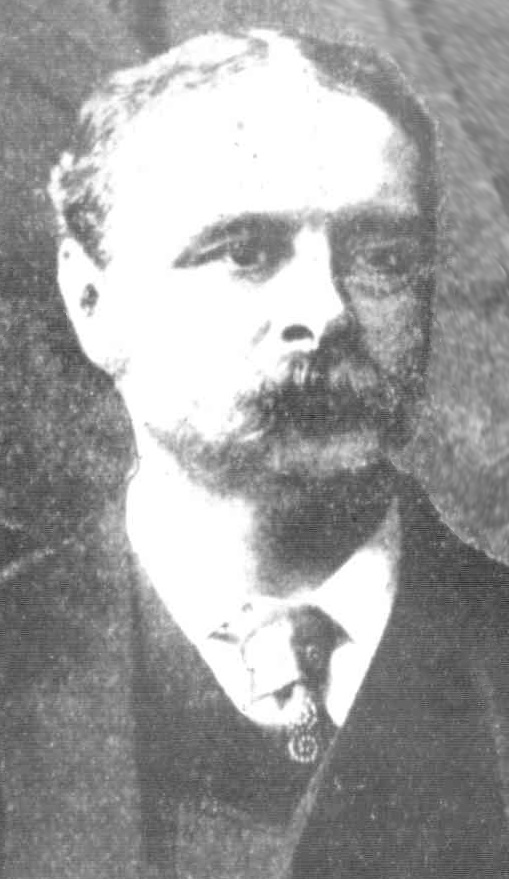
Portrait of Henry Roughton Hogg, published in 1899.

In March 1881 Hogg left Melbourne aboard the R.M.S. Brindisi travelling to London, though he departed from the vessel at Venice. On 7 September 1881 Hogg was married to Adelaide Lashbrooke Elder at Kensington in London. Adelaide was a member of the wealthy Elder family, with business ties to Australia.^{[B]} Henry and Adelaide Hogg arrived in Melbourne in June 1882 aboard the R.M.S. Sutlej. The couple had no children but by 1891 they had adopted a daughter named Shirley (born in about 1885).

In April 1883 Hogg made a submission to the Tariff Commission in Melbourne which was considering "the question of duties on wines". He stated that "he considered the Australian climate superior to that of any of the European countries for wine growing". Hogg represented himself as one who had "studied the wine trade in England, France, Spain and Portugal"; he advocated a reduction of the duty and expressed a wish to see Australia become a wine drinking country, "because drunkenness never existed where wine was the beverage".

In June 1883 Henry and Adelaide Hogg (and a maid servant) travelled for a visit to London, aboard the R.M.S. Rome.

Henry Hogg was a council member of the Australian Wine Association of Victoria, formed in October 1885.

Hogg's younger brother William Edward Hogg arrived in Australia in 1885 and joined the firm of Hogg, Robinson, and Co. in Melbourne. The Sydney branch of the firm was opened in 1885 under the management of Augustus Robinson and the company was appointed as the Sydney agents of Lloyd's of London.

Hogg was a member of council of the Victorian Chamber of Commerce. He served as vice-president of the body in 1887 and 1898. He was one of the commissioners representing Victoria at the Adelaide Jubilee Exhibition in South Australia, which ran for six months commencing in June 1887.

Hogg was a member of the exclusive Melbourne Club. In 1891 he purchased a cottage for £2,750 in Club Lane, adjoining land owned by the Melbourne Club, and sold it to the club at no profit. The cottage was converted to sleeping quarters for servants employed at the club. That permitted the removal of partitions where the sleeping quarters had previously been established in the club's racquets court, restoring it for the use of racquets players.

Hogg had begun to acquire a specialist knowledge of the spiders of Australia and New Zealand. He joined the Victorian Field Naturalists' Club of Victoria in May 1888. One of the exhibits at the February 1889 meeting of the Field Naturalists' Club were "specimens of poisonous spider from Riverina", presented by H. R. Hogg.

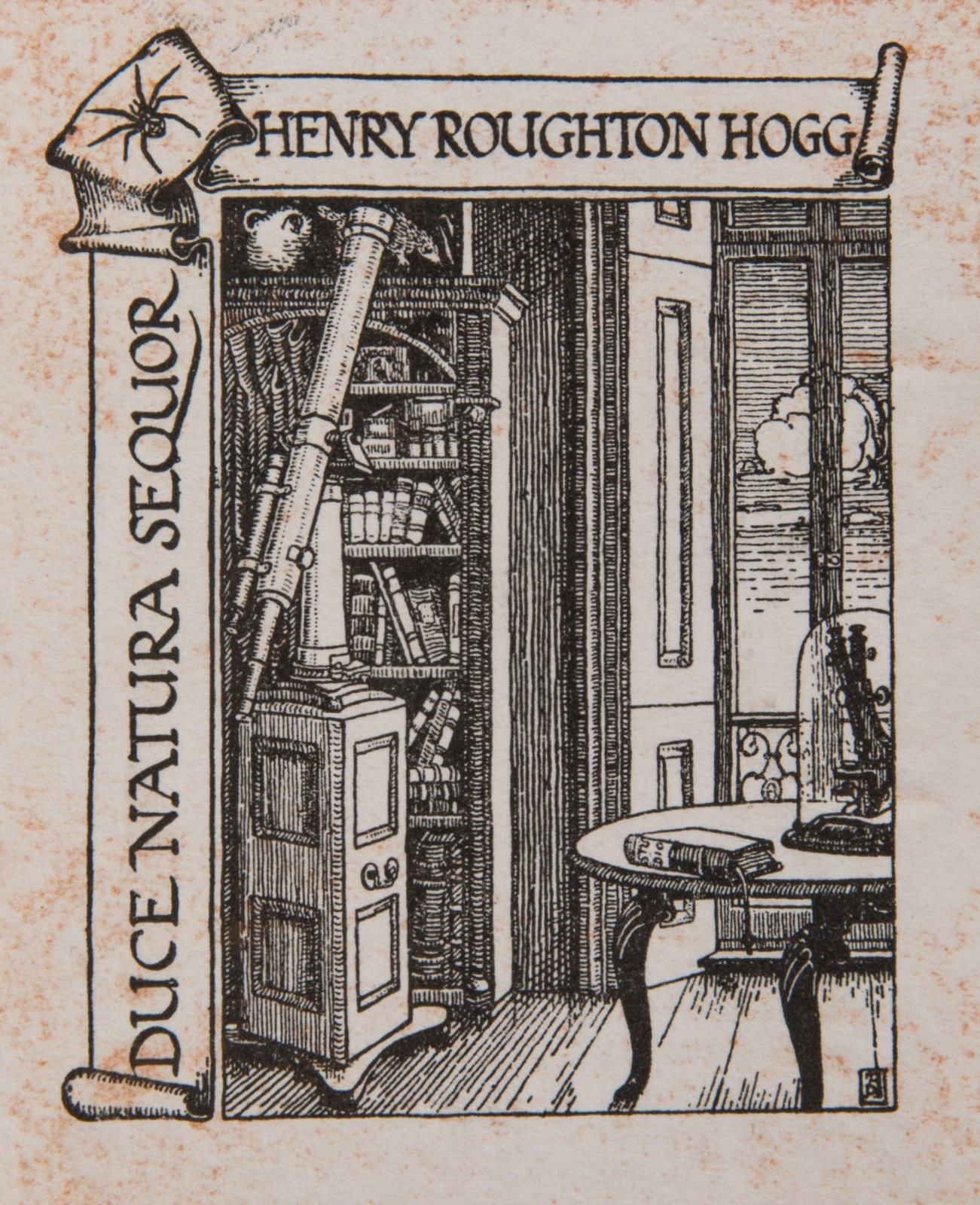
The bookplate of Henry Roughton Hogg, featuring scientific instruments, books and a spider (top left).

Hogg was elected as a member of the Royal Society of Victoria in July 1890 and in 1893 served as a member of council of that body. He was appointed a fellow of the Society and served as honorary treasurer.

In August 1890 the Henry and Adelaide Hogg met Henry Hyde Champion on a social occasion in Melbourne. Champion was a prominent British socialist on a visit to Australia; he had an upper-middle-class background but was actively involved in labour movement politics. Adelaide Hogg and Henry Champion engaged in a secret love affair that lasted for a number of years. In early April 1891 Adelaide Hogg and her adopted child left Melbourne to travel to London aboard the R.M.S. Ormuz. In London Adelaide was involved in nursing her sister Annie, who died in 1892. During her stay she rekindled her relationship with Henry Champion (who had returned to England a month before Adelaide left Melbourne).

Henry Champion arrived back in Australia in April 1894, this time on a permanent basis. His political ambitions in Britain had been thwarted after being excluded from the leadership of the newly-formed Independent Labour Party. He was in debt and out of favour with many in the labour movement in both Britain and Australia, but he had expectations of resuming his relationship with Adelaide Hogg. Champion was employed as a leader writer for The Age newspaper and resided at Beaconsfield, south-east of Melbourne, where Adelaide may have stayed for a time. In August 1894 Adelaide returned to her husband, though Champion later claimed that Henry Hogg was party to an agreement that Adelaide "should see me openly when and where she liked so long as no scandal was created". To what extent, the affair continued after August 1894 is a matter of conjecture, but Champion's private letters reveal only occasional and sometimes fractious meetings. By August 1897 the relationship had come to an end.^{[C]}

In August 1895 Henry Hogg read a short paper at the meeting of the Royal Society of Victoria on 'Certain Spiders from Central Australia'. The spiders had been obtained by the Horn scientific expedition to central Australia and Hogg had been given the opportunity to examine and classify them. One hundred and fifty specimens had been secured, "mostly of the Queensland type, a few only being common to New Zealand and Fiji". Hogg contributed the section on spiders in the second volume of the four volume publication detailing the results of the Horn scientific expedition, published in February 1896.

From 1896 Hogg was a member of the council of the Zoological and Acclimatisation Society in Melbourne. He was appointed president of the Society in 1897.

By 1897 Henry and Adelaide Hogg were members of the Theosophical Society in Melbourne, a branch known as the Ibis Lodge. They were described as "two of the finest characters and most useful members in our Society". The Hoggs took a leading role in one of the activities of the Society, a scheme for children to holiday at Mount Macedon. They continued their association with the Theosophical Society after returning to London in 1900.

=== Return to England ===
Henry and Adelaide Hogg returned to England in August 1900 aboard the R.M.S. Australia. The couple settled in the London district of Kensington. Hogg's younger brother William took over management of the Melbourne branch of Hogg, Robinson, and Co.

In 1903 Hogg was appointed to the London board of directors of the Eastern and African Cold Storage Company Ltd. (registered in South Australia) which acquired extensive pastoral leases in the Northern Territory. In 1904 he was residing at 13 St. Helen's Place in London. He was appointed as a director of Sanderson, Murray & Elder Ltd. By June 1904 Hogg was a director of the Sunderland District Electric Tramways Ltd.

Hogg was a fellow of both the Zoological Society of London and the Botanical Society of London. Eleven papers written by Hogg on spiders from various parts of the world were published in the Proceedings of the Zoological Society of London between 1901 and 1922.

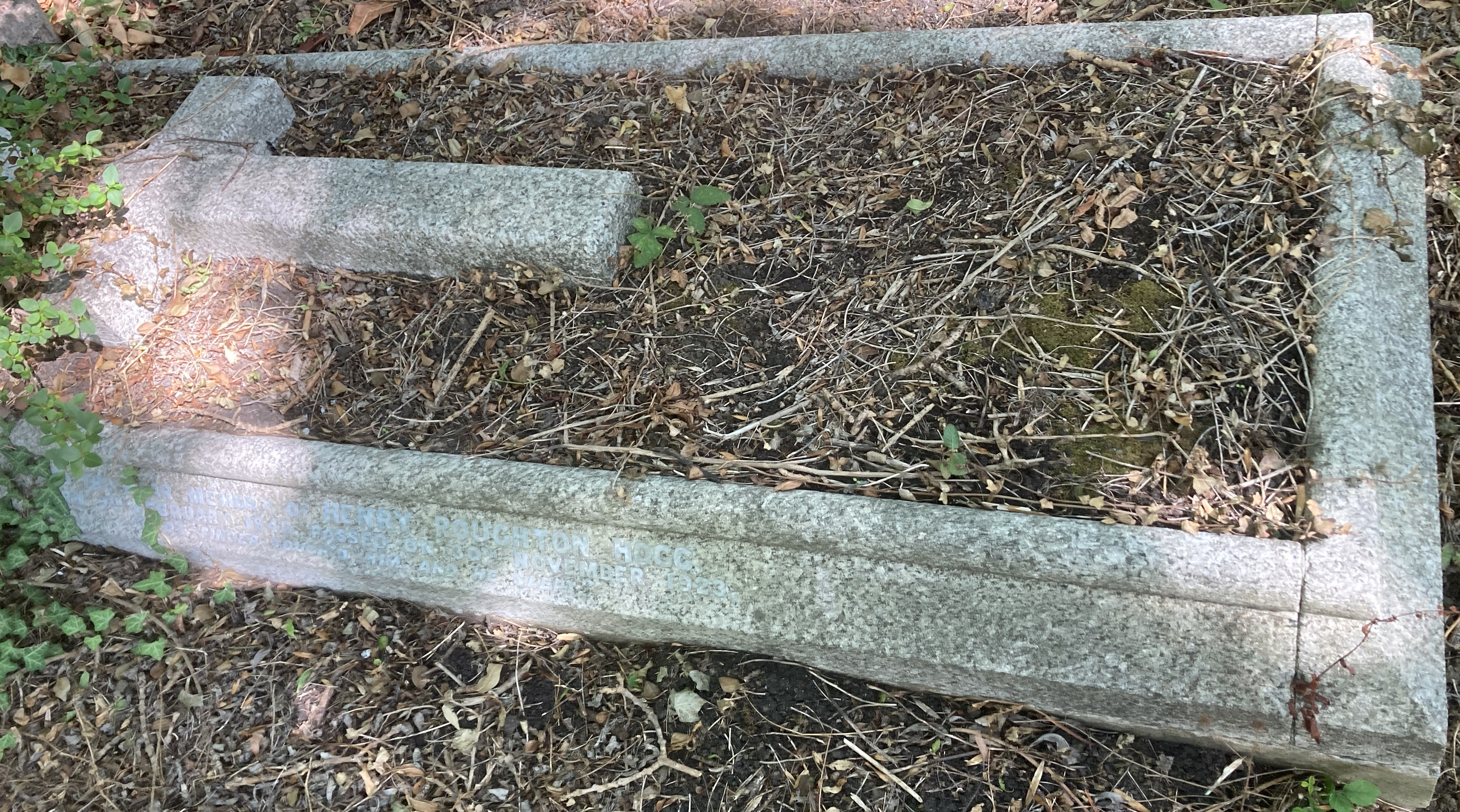
The grave of Henry Roughton Hogg in Highgate Cemetery

In London Hogg became a member of the Society for Psychical Research.

In 1907 Hogg was residing at 2 Vicarage Gate in London. In February 1907 he was a director of the Durham Collieries Electric Power Company Ltd.

Hogg and his wife visited Australia in 1909. They returned to England aboard the R.M.S. Mongolia, which departed from Sydney in August 1909 for London.

In July 1912 Hogg represented the Royal Society of Victoria at a series of events in London to celebrate the 250th anniversary of the Royal Society.

Henry Roughton Hogg died on 30 November 1923, aged 77, at the Empire Nursing Home at Vincent Square, Westminster, London. He was buried on the eastern side of Highgate Cemetery.

After Hogg's death his widow donated his entire research library, a collection of four hundred volumes, to the Balfour Zoological Library at Cambridge University. Seventy-five books in the collection dealt with "the spiders and related groups". Hogg bequeathed his collected specimens to the Natural History Museum in London.

Adelaide Lashbrooke Elder Hogg died on 11 September 1930 at 3 Duoro Place, Kensington, London.

== Legacy ==
Hoggicosa, the genus of wolf spiders, is named after Henry Roughton Hogg.

== Publications ==
- Baldwin Spencer (ed.) (1896), Report on the Work of the Horn Expedition to Central Australia (4 vols), London: Dulau and Co. and Melbourne: Melville, Mullen & Slade. Hogg contributed the section on spiders in volume II (Zoology) of the publication ('Araneidæ', pages 309-357).
- Charles Chilton (ed.) (1909), The Subantarctic Islands of New Zealand (Vol. 1), Wellington, N.Z.: John Mackay (Government Printer). Hogg contributed: 'Article IX. Spiders and Opiliones from the Subantarctic Islands of New Zealand', pages 155-181.
- Robert Sterling Clark & Arthur de Carle Sowerby (1912), Through Shên-kan: The account of the Clark Expedition in North China, 1908-9, London: T. Fisher Unwin. Hogg contributed the section on spiders ('Appendix V. Araneidae of the Clark Expedition to Northern China', pages 204-218).

Henry Roughton Hogg (author):

- 'Notes on some spiders from the Upper Endeavour River, Queensland, with description of two new species', Proceedings of the Royal Society of Victoria, Vol. 11, 1899, pages 137-146.
- 'A contribution to our Knowledge of the Spiders of Victoria; including some New Species and Genera', Proceedings of the Royal Society of Victoria, Vol. 13, August 1900, pages 68-123.
- 'On Australian and New Zealand spiders of the suborder Mygalomorphæ', Proceedings of the Zoological Society of London, 1901, pages 218-279.
- 'On some additions to the Australian spiders of the suborder Mygalomorphæ' (pages 121-142); 'On the Australasian spiders of the subfamily Sparassinæ' (pages 414-466), Proceedings of the Zoological Society of London, Vol. II, 1902.
- 'Two new Australian spiders of the family Ctenizidæ', Annals and Magazine of Natural History, Vol. 11, Series 7, 1903, pages 308-312.
- 'On a new genus of spiders from Bounty Island, with remarks on a species from New Zealand', Annals and Magazine of Natural History, Series 7, 13(73), 1904, pages 65-70.
- 'On some South Australian spiders of the family Lycosidæ', Proceedings of the Zoological Society of London, Vol. II, 1905, pages 569-590.
- 'Some New Zealand and Tasmanian Arachnidæ', Transactions of the New Zealand Institute, Vol. 42, 1909, pages 273-283.
- 'Two new Nephilæ from South Australia', Transactions and Proceedings of the Royal Society of South Australia, Vol. 34, 1910, pages 59-62.
- 'On some New Zealand Spiders', Proceedings of the Zoological Society of London, Vol. 81, Issue 2, 1911, pages 297-313.
- 'Some Falkland Island spiders', Proceedings of the Zoological Society of London, 1913, pages 37-50.
- 'Spiders from the Montebello Islands', Proceedings of the Zoological Society of London, 1914, pages 69-92.
- 'Spiders collected by the Wollaston and British Ornithological Union Expeditions in Dutch New Guinea', Proceedings of the Zoological Society of London (Series C Abstracts), 137, 1914, pages 56–58.
- 'Report on the spiders collected by the British Ornithologists' Union Expedition and the Wollaston Expedition in Dutch New Guinea', Transactions of the Zoological Society of London, Vol. 20, 1915, pages 425-484.
- 'On spiders of the family Salticidæ collected by the British Ornithologists' Union Expedition and the Wollaston Expedition in Dutch New Guinea', Proceedings of the Zoological Society of London, 1915, pages 501-528.
- 'Spiders collected in Korinchi, West Sumatra by Messrs H. C. Robinson and C. Boden Kloss', Journal of the Federated Malay States Museums, 8(3), 1919, pages 81-106.
- 'Some Australian Opiliones', Proceedings of the Zoological Society of London, 1920, pages 31-48.
- 'Some spiders from south Annam', Proceedings of the Zoological Society of London, 1922, pages 285-312.

== Notes ==
A.The firm of Hogg and Robinson was located at 34 Eastcheap in London. The partners in the business were Francis Henry Hogg (Hogg's father), Augustus Octavius Robinson, Francis George Hogg and John William Robinson. Francis Henry Hogg left the partnership on 31 December 1881. Francis Henry Hogg died at his residence in South Kensington, London, on 5 April 1883.

B.Adelaide Lashbrooke Elder was the daughter of Alexander Lang Elder and his wife Mary, born in 1854. Her father had founded the merchantile firm Elder, Smith and Co. in Adelaide, South Australia. Alexander Elder and his family moved back to England in 1853 where he headed the firm of A. L. Elder and Co. of London (leaving Elder, Smith and Co., later to become one of the world's largest wool-selling companies, under the control of his younger brother Thomas).

C.On 8 December 1898 Henry Hyde Champion married Elsie Belle Goldstein, the daughter of the suffragist and social reformer Isabella Goldstein and sister of Vida Goldstein.
