= 1892 United Kingdom general election in Scotland =

- 4–24 July 1892

All 72 Scottish seats to the House of Commons
- Turnout: 78.3% (▲6.0 pp)
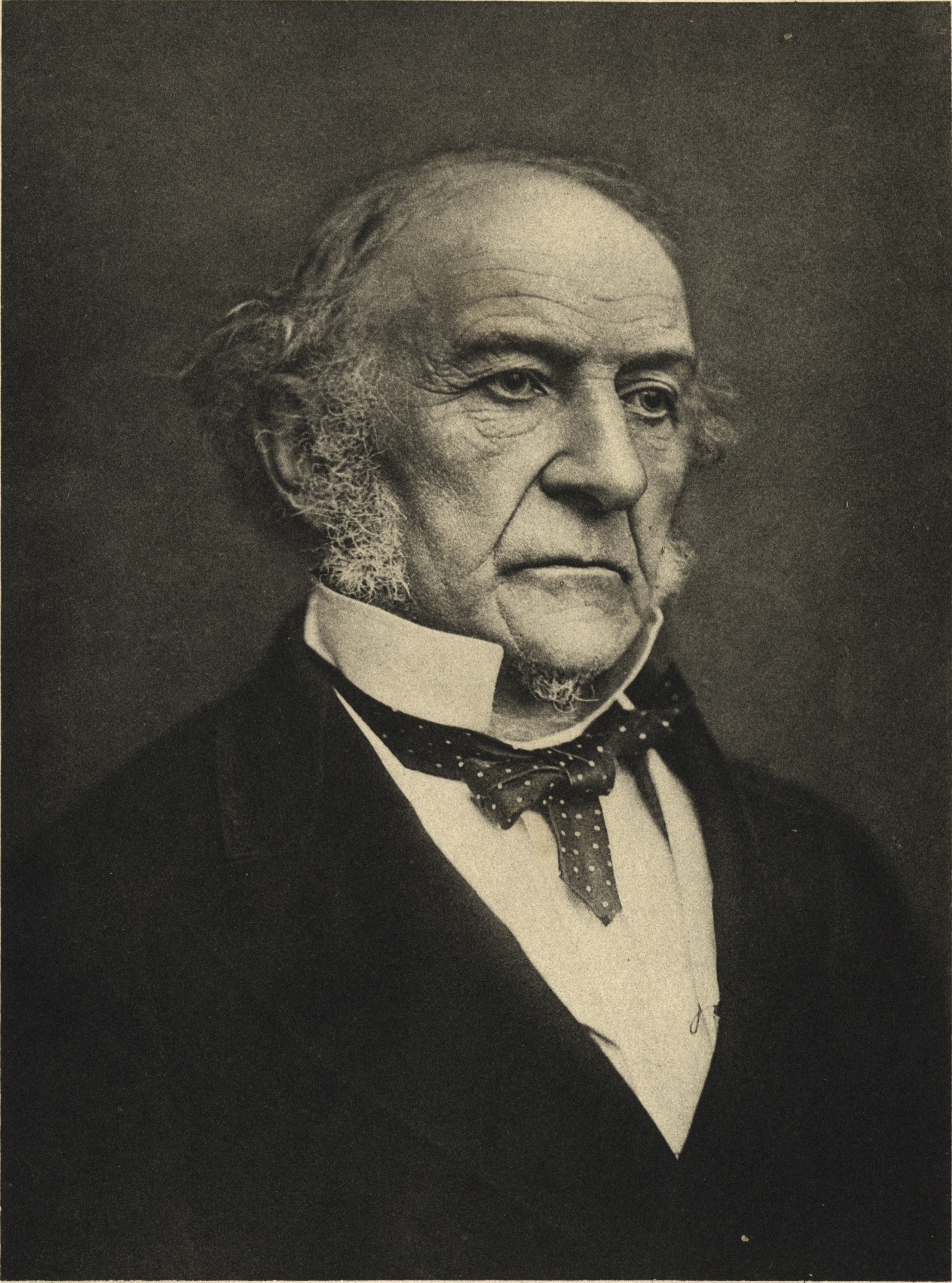

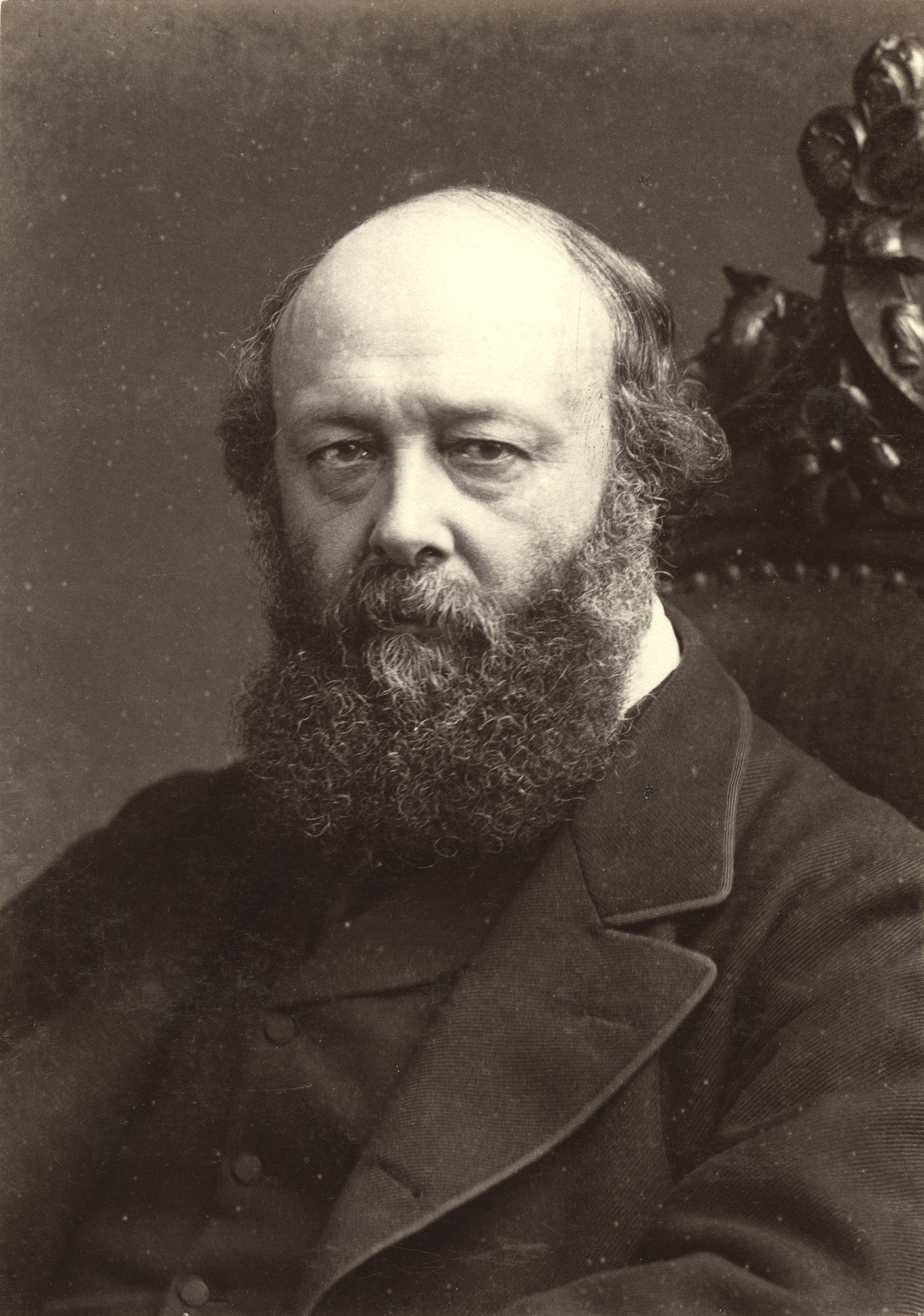

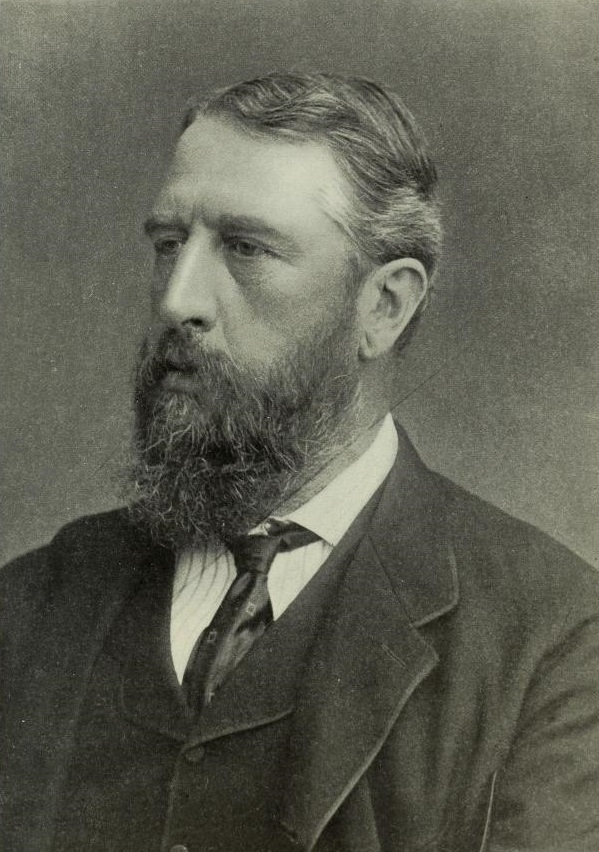
| | First party | Second party | Third party |
|---|---|---|---|
| Leader | William Ewart Gladstone | Marquess of Salisbury | Duke of Devonshire |
| Party | Liberal | Conservative | Liberal Unionist |
| Alliance | Liberal | Conservative-Liberal Unionist | Conservative-Liberal Unionist |
| Leader since | April 1880 | April 1881 | 1886 |
| Leader's seat | Midlothian | House of Lords | House of Lords |
| Last election | 43 seats (Note: Combined results for burgh, county and university seats) 53.6% | 12 seats, 14.8% | 17 seats, 31.6% |
| Seats won | 50 | 11 | 11 |
| Seat change | ▲7 | ▼1 | ▼6 |
| Popular vote | 256,944 (Note: Total and percentage votes given here are for territorial constituencies only) | 106,036 | 103,908 |
| Percentage | 53.9% | 22.4% | 22.0% |
| Swing | ▲0.3% pp | ▲7.6% pp | ▼9.6 pp |
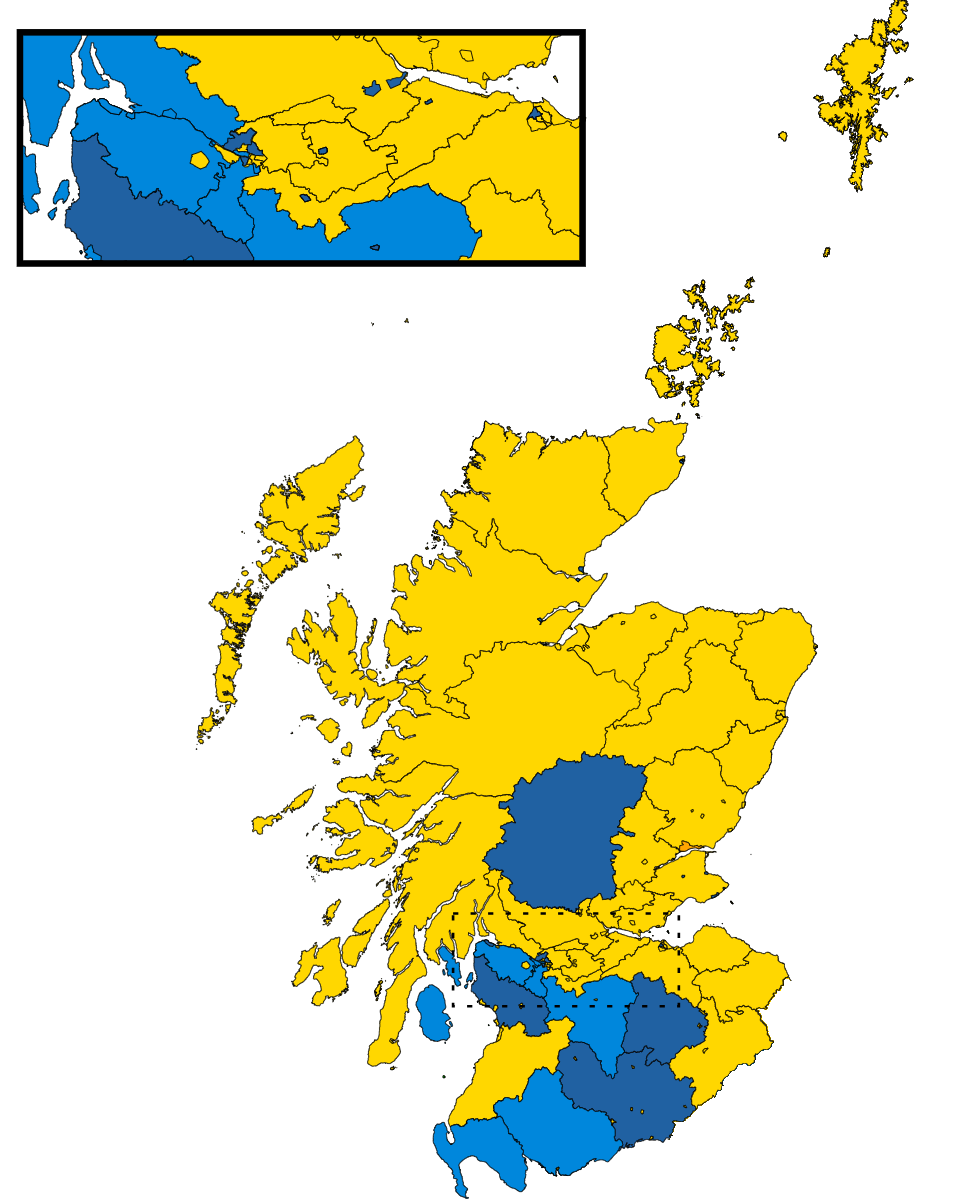
- Results of the 1892 election in Scotland for the county and burgh seats

The 1892 United Kingdom general election was held from 4 to 26 July 1892, and members were returned for all Scottish seats. Scotland was allocated 72 seats in total, of which 70 were territorial seats, comprising 32 burgh constituencies and 37 county constituencies. (Note: One burgh seat, Dundee, was represented by two members of parliament.) There were also two university constituencies, Glasgow and Aberdeen Universities and Edinburgh and St Andrews Universities. As voters in university constituencies voted in addition to their territorial vote, the results are compiled separately.

The election was called due to the maximum duration of Parliament of seven years under the Septennial Act 1715 coming to close. Although the Liberals, led by William Ewart Gladstone won a majority of the seats in Scotland, when combined with results from across the United Kingdom the Conservatives and its ally the Liberal Unionist Party, led by Lord Salisbury again won the greatest number of seats, however they were no longer able to command a majority in the House of Commons. Salisbury refused to resign on hearing the election results and waited to be defeated in a vote of no confidence on 11 August. Gladstone formed a minority government dependent on Irish Nationalist support.

The election was the first election in Scotland to see meaningful attempts by groups associated with the trades union movement to win seats: the Scottish United Trades Councils Labour Party stood in three seats whilst the Scottish Labour Party (1888) stood in three seats. Neither group was able to win seats.

== Candidates ==
Below is a table summarising the candidates of the 1892 general election in Scotland, excluding those in the university constituencies.

| Affiliation | Candidates |
|---|---|
| Scottish Liberal Party | 70 |
| Liberal Unionist Party | 37 |
| Conservative Party | 31 |
| Scottish Labour Party | 3 (Note: The candidates that stood were James MacDonald in Dundee, Cunninghame Graham in Glasgow Camlachie and Bennet Burleigh in Glasgow Tradeston.) |
| Scottish United Trades Councils | 3 (Note: The candidates that stood were Henry Hyde Champion in Aberdeen South, Robert Brodie in Glasgow College and Robert Chisholm Robertson in Stirlingshire.) |
| Scottish Socialist Federation | 1 (Note: Candidate John Wilson stood in Edinburgh Central.) |
| Perth Independent Liberal and Radical | 1 (Note: Candidate James Woollen stood in Perth.) |
| Kincardineshire Church Defence | 1 (Note: Candidate Johnston Stephen stood in Kincardineshire.) |
| Independent Liberal | 1 (Note: Candidate Hugh Watt stood in Glasgow Camlachie.) |
| Independent Conservative | 1 (Note: Candidate Maltman Barry stood in Banffshire.) |
| Total | 149 |

== Analysis ==
=== Liberal Party ===
Although the Liberals, led by William Ewart Gladstone won a majority of the seats in Scotland, when combined with results from across the United Kingdom the Conservatives, led by Lord Salisbury again won the greatest number of seats, however they were no longer able to command a majority in the House of Commons. In Scotland, the Liberal party won a total of 50 seats, a net gain of 7 seats overall, as well as a very minor vote share increase of just 0.3%.

It won Dunbartonshire, Glasgow Govan and Argyllshire from the Conservative Party. It also won Inverness Burghs, Inverness-shire, Falkirk Burghs, Ayr Burghs, South Ayrshire, Glasgow St Rollox, Roxburghshire from the Liberal Unionists. Accordingly, with a gain of 11 seats, but also owning to four losses to the Conservatives and Liberal Unionists, it increased its seats in Scotland by 7.

=== Conservative Party ===
The Conservative Party saw almost no change in its vote share and seat count, with the party taking 11 seats in Scotland, on par with its previously more dominant allies in Scotland, the Liberal Unionist Party. The party saw a large swing towards its, owing to the fact it stood more candidates than it had in the previous election.

Party held the university constituency seats of Edinburgh and St Andrews Universities and Glasgow and Aberdeen Universities. It also held the county and borough seats of East Renfrewshire, West Renfrewshire, Buteshire, Glasgow Central, South Lanarkshire, Kirkcudbright Stewartry and Wigtownshire.

It also won Perth from the Liberal Party, as well as North West Lanarkshire from its prior-supported Liberal Labour MP; however, the Conservatives won the seat from a new Liberal candidate, owing to Cunninghame Graham defecting parties. However, it lost the three seats to the Liberal, thereby returning a net loss of 1 seat in Scotland.

=== Liberal Unionist Party ===
The Liberal Unionist Party held most of its seats in Scotland, however, saw some exchanges with the Liberal Party. It saw a large drop in vote share, owing to the party standing fewer candidates than the previous election, with the Conservative Party (its ally) standing more. It held its seats in West Perthshire, St Andrews Burghs, North Ayrshire, Glasgow Tradeston, Partick, Edinburgh West, Dumfriesshire and Peebles and Selkirk. It also won Wick Burghs, Glasgow Camlachie from the Liberal Party.

In the seat of Greenock, it was initially returned that the Liberal Party had gained the seat from the Liberal Unionist's incumbent, Thomas Sutherland, winning by 44 votes. However, following an election petition, it was recounted and returned Sutherland as the MP for the seat by 55 votes. This has led to collations of Scotland to differ on whether the combined Liberal Unionist and Conservative total of seats is 19 to 20 seats amongst the county and burgh constituencies; however, sources point to the actual return due to this correction to be 20, with the Liberal Unionist making up 11 of that count in the county and burgh seats. Therefore, the party retained the seat.

The Liberal Unionists, therefore, returned a total of 11 seats in Scotland, seeing a fall by 6 seats. Combined with its alliance with the Conservative party, the two parties won a total of 22 seats in Scotland, and 315 nationally. However, they would take the position as the opposition against the minority Liberal Government.

=== Other parties ===
The election was the first election in Scotland to see meaningful attempts by groups associated with the trades union movement to win seats. The Scottish United Trades Councils Labour Party stood in three seats. These were Henry Hyde Champion in Aberdeen South, Robert Brodie in Glasgow College and Robert Chisholm Robertson in Stirlingshire.

The Scottish Labour Party (1888) stood in three seats. These were James MacDonald in Dundee, Cunninghame Graham in Glasgow Camlachie and Bennet Burleigh in Glasgow Tradeston.

Lastly, the Scottish Socialist Federation stood a joint candidate with the Scottish Trade Council. This was John Wilson, who stood in Edinburgh Central. Nevertheless, no group won seats, with the Scottish Labour Party being the most successful at 2,043 votes.

== Seats summary ==
Below is a table summarising the total number of seats, gains and losses for each party in both the territorial county and burgh constituencies and the university constituencies.

| Party | Seats | | | | |
| Party | Total | Gains | Losses | Net | Of all (%) |
|---|---|---|---|---|---|
| Liberal | 50 | 11 | 4 | ▲7 | 69.4 |
| Conservative-Liberal Unionist | 22 | 4 | 11 | ▼7 | 30.6 |
| Conservative | 11 | 2 | 3 | ▼1 | 15.3 |
| Liberal Unionist | 11 | 2 | 8 | ▼6 | 15.3 |
| Total | 72 | | | | |

== County and burgh results ==
| Party | Seats | | | | | Aggregate votes | | |
| Party | Total | Gains | Losses | Net | Of total (%) | Total | Of total (%) (Note: Adjusted for multi-member constituencies.) | Change (%) |
|---|---|---|---|---|---|---|---|---|
| Liberal | 50 | 11 | 4 | ▲7 | 71.4 | 256,944 | 53.9 | ▲0.3 |
| Conservative-Liberal Unionist | 20 | 4 | 11 | ▼7 | 28.6 | 209,944 | 44.4 | ▼2.0 |
| Conservative | 9 | 2 | 3 | ▼1 | 12.9 | 106,036 | 22.4 | ▲7.6 |
| Liberal Unionist | 11 | 2 | 8 | ▼6 | 15.7 | 103,908 | 22.0 | ▼9.6 |
| Scottish Labour | 0 | New | | | — | 2,043 | 0.4 | New |
| United Trades Councils | 0 | New | | | — | 1,879 | 0.4 | New |
| Ind. Conservative | 0 | Did not stand in 1886 | | | — | 1,424 | 0.3 | —N/a |
| Church Defence | 0 | New | | | — | 1,376 | 0.3 | New |
| Ind. Liberal and Radical | 0 | New | | | — | 907 | 0.2 | New |
| Socialist Federation | 0 | New | | | — | 434 | 0.1 | New |
| Independent Liberal | 0 | Did not stand in 1886 | | | — | 179 | 0.0 | —N/a |
| Total | 70 | | | 0 | 100.0 | 475,130 | 100.0 | 0.0 |
| Registered voters, and turnout | | | | | | 569,520 (Note: Electorate in contested constituencies, which was all seats in this election.) | 78.3 | ▲6.0 |

=== Popular vote ===
Popular vote
| Liberal | 53.9% |
| Conservative | 22.4% |
| Liberal Unionist | 22.0% |
| Trades Councils | 0.4% |
| Scottish Labour | 0.4% |
| Others | 0.9% |

Popular vote (alliances)
| Liberal | 53.9% |
| Con-LU | 44.4% |
| Trades Councils | 0.4% |
| Scottish Labour | 0.4% |
| Others | 0.9% |

=== Parliament seats ===
Parliament seats
| Liberal | 69.4% |
| Liberal Unionist | 15.3% |
| Conservative | 15.3% |

Parliament seats
| Liberal | 69.4% |
| Con-LU | 30.6% |

== University constituency results ==
The two university constituencies each elected an additional member to the house. In this election both seats were uncontested, with the sitting members being returned unopposed.

=== Edinburgh and St Andrews Universities ===
General election 1892: Edinburgh and St Andrews Universities
| Party | Candidate | Votes | % | ±% |
|---|---|---|---|---|
| Conservative | Charles Pearson | Unopposed | | |
| Conservative hold | | | | |

=== Glasgow and Aberdeen Universities ===
General election 1892: Glasgow and Aberdeen Universities
| Party | Candidate | Votes | % | ±% |
|---|---|---|---|---|
| Conservative | James Alexander Campbell | Unopposed | | |
| Conservative hold | | | | |

== See also ==
- 1892 United Kingdom general election in England
- 1892 United Kingdom general election in Ireland
- 1892 United Kingdom general election in Wales
- List of United Kingdom Parliament constituencies (1885–1918) by region
