= 1892 United Kingdom general election in England =

- 4–24 July 1892

All 461 English seats to the House of Commons
- Turnout: 78.7% (▲4.6 pp)
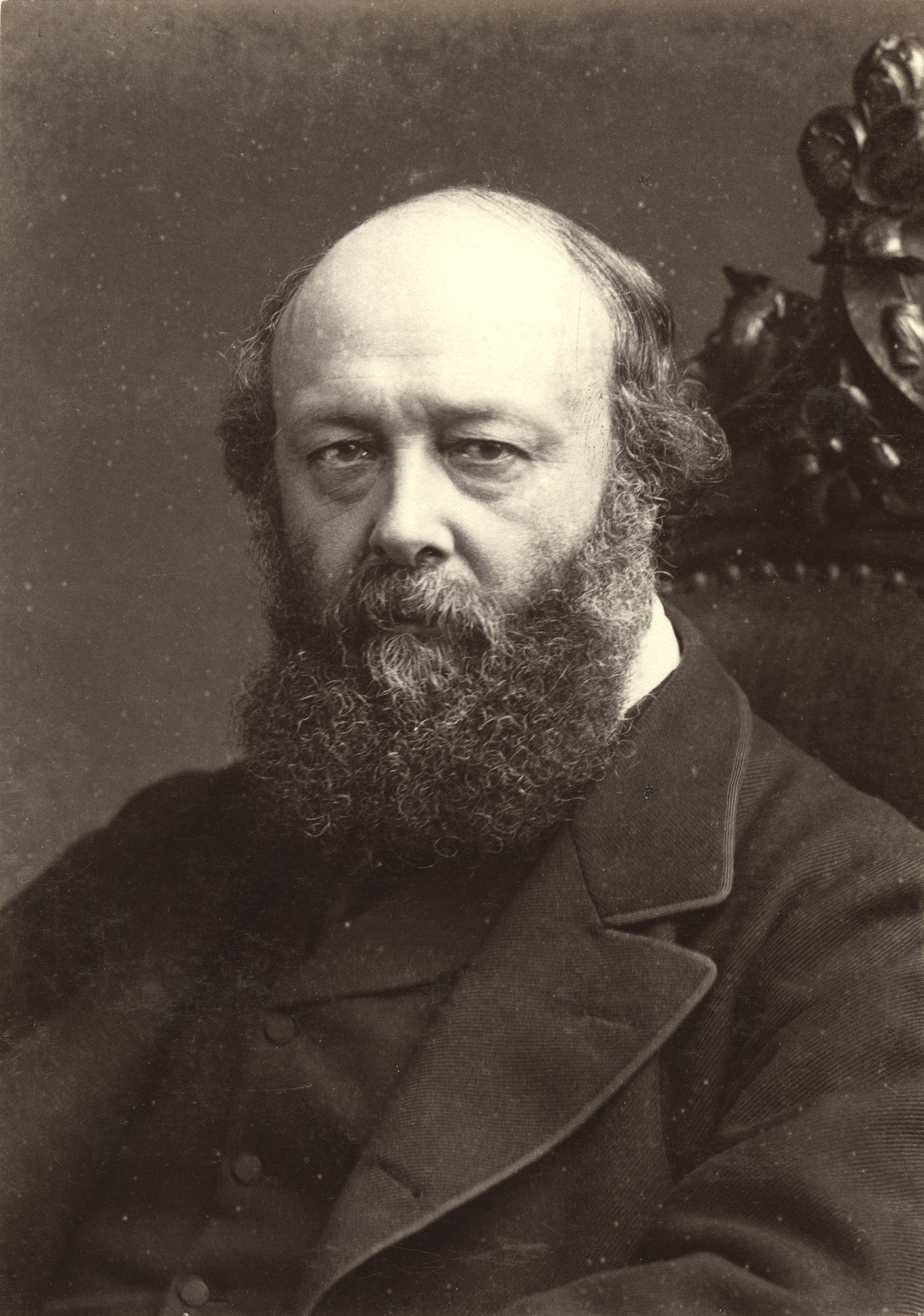

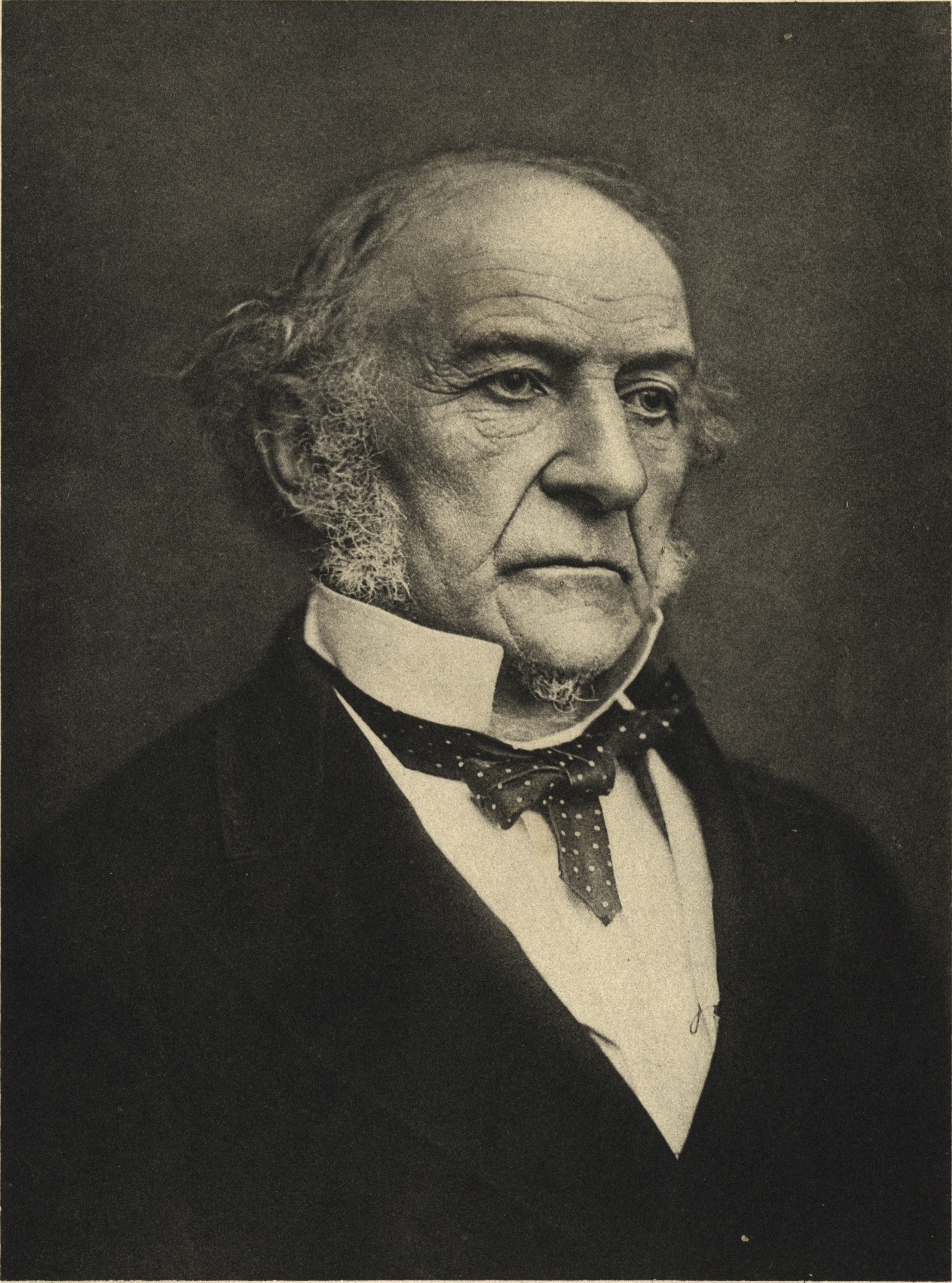

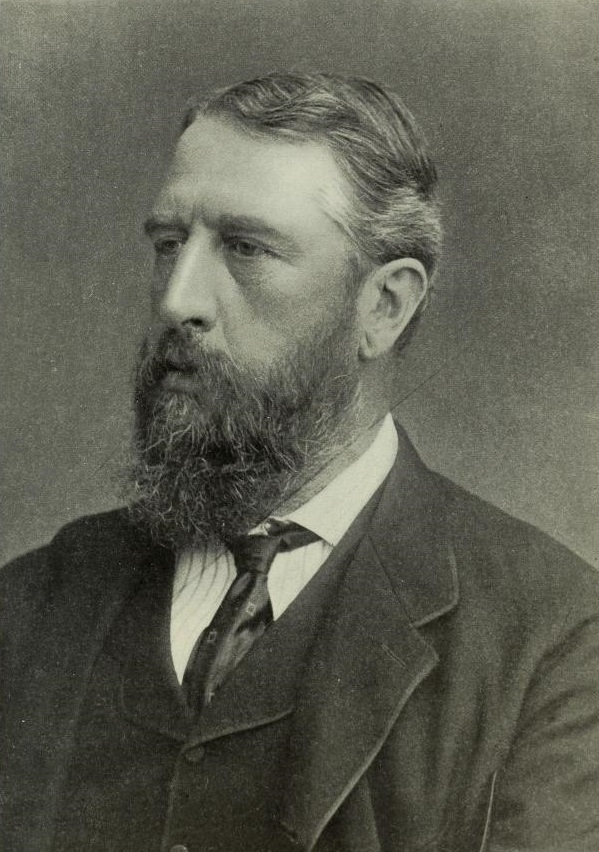
	First party	Second party	Third party
Leader	Marquess of Salisbury	William Ewart Gladstone	Duke of Devonshire
Party	Conservative	Liberal	Liberal Unionist
Alliance	Conservative-Liberal Unionist		Conservative-Liberal Unionist
Leader since	April 1881	April 1880	1886
Leader's seat	House of Lords	Midlothian	House of Lords
Last election	282 seats, (Note: Combined results for borough, county and university seats) 41.1%	122 seats, 47.2%	56 seats, 11.5%
Seats won	235	190	32 (Note: Figure includes Speaker of the House of Commons Arthur Peel in Warwick and Leamington.)
Seat change	▼47	▲68	▼24
Popular vote	1,474,739 (Note: Total and percentage votes given here are for territorial constituencies only)	1,685,283	313,369
Percentage	42.2%	48.0%	8.9%
Swing	▲1.1 pp	▲0.8 pp	▼2.6 pp

From 4 to 26 July 1892, the 1892 United Kingdom general election was held in England, to elect all 670 members of the House of Commons, with 461 seats being in England. 456 seats represented territorial constituencies contested under the first past the post electoral system, and several multi-member constituencies under the block voting system; and 5 additional seats represented the 3 university constituencies which returned members under different voting systems.

The election was called due to the maximum duration of Parliament of seven years under the Septennial Act 1715 coming close. The election saw the Liberal Party make gains from the Conservatives and Liberal Unionists.

Although the Conservatives and its ally the Liberal Unionist Party, led by Lord Salisbury again won the greatest number of seats, they were no longer able to command a majority in the House of Commons. Salisbury refused to resign on hearing the election results and waited to be defeated in a vote of no confidence on 11 August. The Liberals, led by William Ewart Gladstone, formed a minority government dependent on Irish Nationalist support.

== Candidates ==
Below is a table summarising the candidates of the 1892 general election in England, excluding those in the university constituencies.

Affiliation	Candidates
Liberal Party	426 (Note: Includes 13 Liberal-Labour candidates.)
Conservative Party	364
Liberal Unionist Party	78 (Note: Includes Edward Watkin in Hythe, though his candidacy is disputed due to his conflicted party loyalties, and main interest being that of advancing his railway interests; his candidacy is usually described as an Independent Liberal, however, he took Liberal Unionist Whip following the election on votes in Parliament.)
Independent Labour	7
Independent	3 (Note: The candidates that stood were R. Ballard in Bethnal Green North East, Joseph Thomas Rushton in Worcester and John Leighton in St Pancras North.)
Independent Conservative	2 (Note: The candidates that stood were William Henry Bingham-Cox in St Albans and James Ritchie in City of London.)
Social Democratic Federation	2 (Note: The candidates that stood were Hugh Robert Taylor stood in Bethnal Green North East and William Knight Hall in Salford South.)
Bradford Labour Union	1 (Note: Candidate Ben Tillett stood in Bradford West.)
Labour Union	1 (Note: Candidate Alexander Donald stood in Hoxton.)
Nationalist Party	1 (Note: Candidate T. P. O'Connor stood in Liverpool Scotland.)
Independent Liberal	1 (Note: Candidate Daniel Shilton Collin stood in Birmingham East.)
Ind. Liberal and Direct Veto	1 (Note: Candidate Jonathan Hargrove in Houghton-le-Spring.)
Total	886

== Analysis ==
=== Liberal Party ===
The Liberal saw a sharp increase in vote share and seats in England. Nationally, although it did not hold the greatest number of seats, it managed to form a minority government with the Irish Nationalist parties. In England, the party saw an overall increase 68 seats, with 81 gains and 13 losses. The party overwise saw a very minor 0.8% increase in vote share. Its losses mainly went to the Conservative Party and few to the Conservative's ally, the Liberal Unionist Party.

Within the Liberal Party, Liberal-Labour candidates maintained representation for the faction within the Liberal Party overall. It once again held Bethnal Green North East, Finsbury East, Haggerston, Mid Durham, Morpeth, Wansbeck, Normanton. It also re-gained North West Norfolk, which it had lost to the Conservatives in the previous election, as well as gaining Ince. In Shipley, however, this was a gain internally from a reitring Liberal. Although, this set of candidates lost Nottingham West to the Liberal Unionists.

Overall, the Liberals held 190 seats in England, within which 10 were Liberal-Labour MPs.

=== Conservative Party ===
The Conservative Party saw a slight increase in vote share of around 1.1%, but a significant fall in seats. The party lost 60 seats, primarily to the Liberal party. The Conservatives, however, won North Dorset, Walsall, Wednesbury, Wolverhampton West, Stockton-on-Tees, Hexham, Scarborough from the Liberal Party. Additionally, it won one of two seats in Newcastle-upon-Tyne and York respectively. It otherwise retained its seats in the university constituencies.

A notable politician who entered Parliament for the Conservatives was Alfred Baldwin in the seat Bewdley. He was the father to future Prime Minister (and future member for the same constituency), Stanley Baldwin.

Further, there four exchanges between Conservatives and Liberal Unionists in Wilton, Barrow and Furness, Petersfield and Lowestoft from the Liberal Unionists to the Conservatives. In Barrow and Furness, the incumbent Liberal Unionist William Sproston Caine resigned due to disputes with the party. Following a by-election wherein Caine stood as an Independent Liberal, it was won by the Liberal Party. At this election, however, it was won by a Conservative candidate. Notably, Caine, despite being an integral organiser of the Liberal Unionists in its early years, he was re-elected in Bradford East as a Liberal. Nevertheless, Barrow and Furness was again for the Conservatives against its ally. In Petersfield, incumbent Liberal Unionist, William Palmer, retired from the House of Commons, with the seat instead running Conservative William Wickham who retained the seat for the alliance, but at the expense of the Liberal Unionists at this election. In Wilton, Liberal Unionist Sir Thomas Grove, with the Conservative winning the seat with candidate Jacob Pleydell-Bouverie. In Lowestoft, Liberal Unionist Savile Crossley did not stand, with Conservative Harry Foster winning the seat. Overall, with 60 losses, but with 13 gains from the party, the Conservatives lost a total of 47 seats in England.

Overall, the Conservatives returned 231 county and borough seats, as well as its 4 seats in the university constituencies. The party, despite holding the greatest number of seats in England alone and when combined with its Liberal Unionist allies, went into opposition against the minority Liberal Party government.

=== Liberal Unionist Party ===
The Liberal Unionist Party, led by the Duke of Devonshire in the House of Lord (and Joseph Chamberlain in the House of Commons), saw a slightly more significant drop of around 2.6% compared to the Conservative Party, but with a loss of 24 seats. The party retained Bodmin, St Ives, Truro, Totnes, East Somerset, Aylesbury, South Norfolk, Sudbury, Ludlow, Wellington (Shropshire), Handsworth, St Pancras South, West Staffordshire, Wolverhampton South, Ross, Droitwich, East Worcestershire, Warwick and Leamington, West Derbyshire and Bury.

It also retained one of the two seats in Bath, as well as its university constituency seat in London University, as well as its Birmingham provincial borough seats of Birmingham Bordesley, Birmingham Central, Birmingham Edgbaston, Birmingham North, Birmingham South and Birmingham West.

However, it lost to the Liberal Party and Conservatives Barnstaple, South Molton, Tavistock, Bristol North, Cirencester, Cricklade, Wilton, Woodstock, Petersfield, Islington West, Biggleswade, Mid Norfolk, Newcastle-under-Lyme, North Worcestershire, Chesterfield, Great Grimsby, Barrow and Furness, Burnley, Northwich, South East Durham, The Hartlepools, Colne Valley, Skipton. It lost its seat in Portsmouth (one of two in the constituency).

It also lost Peterborough, which the Liberals had retained after winning a by-election against the Liberal Unionists. It lost Rossendale following former leader Spencer Cavendish (though still leader in the House of Lords) taking his peerage in as the Duke of Devonshire, following which the 1892 Rossendale by-election was held.

Conversely, the Liberal Unionist Party won Westminster St George's, Hanover Square, which was a gain from the Conservatives. Liberal Unionist George Goschen won the seat at the 1887 St George's, Hanover Square by-election following the resignation of Conservative Lord Algernon Percy, and retained it at this election. The represented a gain from the Conservatives nonetheless. Goschen, however, would go on to join the Carlton Club during this term in Parliament, becoming a Conservative MP before the next election. The Liberal Unionists also won from the Liberal party Lichfield, Nottingham West.

Of dispute, however, is the candidature Edward Watkin in the seat of Hythe. Watkin had won the held initially in 1885 United Kingdom general election in England as an Independent Liberal, and defected to the Liberal Unionists at the formation of the party before the previous election. However, due to the rather erratic party loyalty of Watkin between the Liberals, the Liberal Unionists and his central parliamentary interest in his railway projects, it has been disputed as to whether he stood as an Independent Liberal or Liberal Unionists at this election. Studies have placed him standing as an Independent Liberal; however, given his tendency to take the Liberal Unionist Whip on Parliamentary votes following the election, he has been recognised as at the every least standing as a Liberal Unionist candidate and winning as such as this election.

As such, which 3 gains but 27 losses in England, the Liberal Unionist Party were left with 31 seats between the county and borough constituencies and its 1 seat in London University. This as a total of 32 seats, but a net loss of 24 seats in England when compared with the previous election.

=== Labour movement ===
As party of the wider working-class movements amongst labour, several of such candidates and parties stood across the United Kingdom, including several Independent Labour candidates in England. These candidates were relatively successful, with 3 being elected in England. Independent Labour candidate Havelock Wilson won Middlesbrough from the Liberal party; however, he would go onto join the Liberal-Labour faction of the Liberal Party before the next election, rather than joining any external party. Similarly, John Burns won Battersea from the Liberal Party. He would also join the Liberal-Labour faction of the Liberal Party before the next election.

Further, from Conservative Party in the County of London, Labour organiser and candidate Keir Hardie won the seat of West Ham South, with Hardie entering Parliament for the first time in his political career. Hardie would go onto to be one of the founders and leader of the Independent Labour Party before the next election, however, it would see no success in that election.

== Seats summary ==
Below is a table summarising the total number of seats, gains and losses for each party in both the territorial county and borough constituencies and the university constituencies.

Party	Seats				
Party	Total	Gains	Losses	Net	Of all (%)
Conservative-Liberal Unionist	267	16	87	▼71	57.9
Conservative	235	13	60	▼47	51.0
Liberal Unionist	32	3	27	▼24	6.9
Liberal	190 (Note: Includes 10 Liberal-Labour MPs.)	81	13	▲68	41.2
Independent Labour	3	New		▲3	0.7
Irish Nationalist	1	0	0	Steady	0.2
Total	461				

== County and borough results ==
Below is a table summarising the constituency results of the 1892 general election in England, excluding the result in the university constituencies.

Party	Seats					Aggregate votes		
Party	Total	Gains	Losses	Net	Of total (%)	Total	Of total (%) (Note: Adjusted for multi-member constituencies.)	Change (%)
Conservative-Liberal Unionist	262	16	87	▼71	57.5	1,788,108	51.1	▼1.5
Conservative	231	13	60	▼47	50.7	1,474,739	42.2	▲1.1
Liberal Unionist	31	3	27	▼24	6.8	313,369	8.9	▼2.6
Liberal	190 (Note: Includes 10 Liberal-Labour MPs.)	81	13	▲68	41.7	1,685,283	48.0	▲0.8
Independent Labour	3	New		▲3	0.7	19,430	0.6	New
Ind. Conservative	0	Did not stand in 1886			—	5,787	0.1	—N/a
Bradford Labour	0	New			—	2,749	0.1	New
Irish Nationalist	1 (Note: T. P. O'Connor in Liverpool Scotland.)	0	0	Steady	0.2	2,537	0.1	Steady
Ind. Liberal and Direct Veto	0	New			—	814	0.0	New
Social Democratic Federation	0	Did not stand in 1886			—	659	0.0	—N/a
Independent Liberal	0	0	0	Steady	—	296	0.0	▼0.1
Independent	0	Did not stand in 1886			—	137	0.0	—N/a
Labour Union	0	New			—	19	0.0	New
Total	456			0	100.0	3,505,819	100.0	0.0
Registered voters, and turnout						4,176,656 (Note: Electorate in contested constituencies. The total electorate was 4,478,524.)	78.7	▲4.6

=== Popular vote ===
Popular vote
Liberal	48.0%
Conservative	42.2%
Liberal Unionist	8.9%
Irish Nationalist	0.1%
Others	0.8%

Popular vote (alliances)
Con-LU	51.1%
Liberal	48.0%
Irish Nationalist	0.1%
Others	0.8%

=== Parliament seats ===
Parliament seats
Conservative	50.7%
Liberal	41.7%
Liberal Unionist	6.8%
Ind. Labour	0.7%
Irish Nationalist	0.2%

Parliament seats (alliances)
Con-LU	57.5%
Liberal	41.7%
Ind. Labour	0.7%
Irish Nationalist	0.2%

== University constituency results ==
=== University results summary ===
Below is a table summarising the seats and vote share of the English university constituencies in the 1892 general election.

Party	Seats				Aggregate votes	
Party	Total	Gains	Losses	Net	Total	Of all (%)
Conservative-Liberal Unionist	5	0	0	Steady	0	0.0
Conservative	4	0	0	Steady	0	0.0
Liberal Unionist	1	0	0	Steady	0	0.0
Total	5				0	

=== Cambridge University ===
The constituency for Cambridge University returned two Members of Parliament using the Plurality block voting electoral system. The electorate consisted of graduates of the university.

General election 1892: Cambridge University (2 seats)
Party	Candidate	Votes	%	±%
Conservative	Sir John Eldon Gorst	Unopposed		
Conservative	Richard Claverhouse Jebb	Unopposed		
Conservative hold				
Conservative hold				

=== London University ===
The constituency for London University returned one Member of Parliament using the First-past-the-post electoral system. The electorate consisted of graduates of the university.

General election 1892: London University
Party	Candidate	Votes	%	±%
Liberal Unionist	John Lubbock	Unopposed		
Liberal Unionist hold				

=== Oxford University ===
The constituency for Oxford University returned two Members of Parliament using the Plurality block voting electoral system. The electorate consisted of graduates of the university.

General election July 1892: Oxford University (2 seats)
Party	Candidate	Votes	%	±%
Conservative	John Mowbray	Unopposed		
Conservative	John Gilbert Talbot	Unopposed		
Conservative hold				
Conservative hold				

== See also ==
- 1892 United Kingdom general election in Ireland
- 1892 United Kingdom general election in Scotland
- 1892 United Kingdom general election in Wales
- List of United Kingdom Parliament constituencies (1885–1918) by region
- List of MPs for constituencies in Wales (1892–1895)
