= 1892 United Kingdom general election =

- 4–26 July 1892

All 670 seats in the House of Commons 336 seats needed for a majority
- Turnout: 4,317,312; 77.4% (▲3.2 pp)
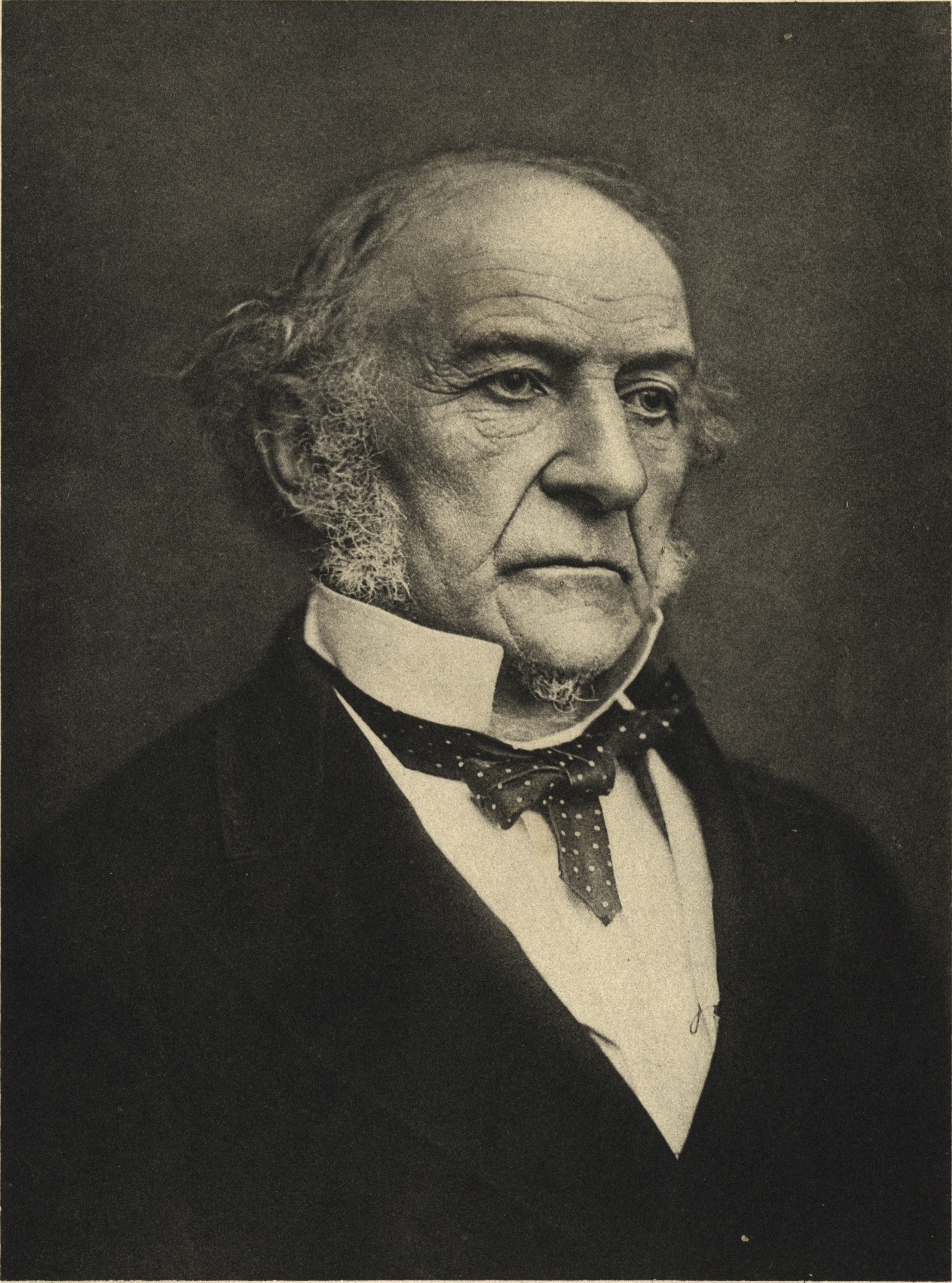

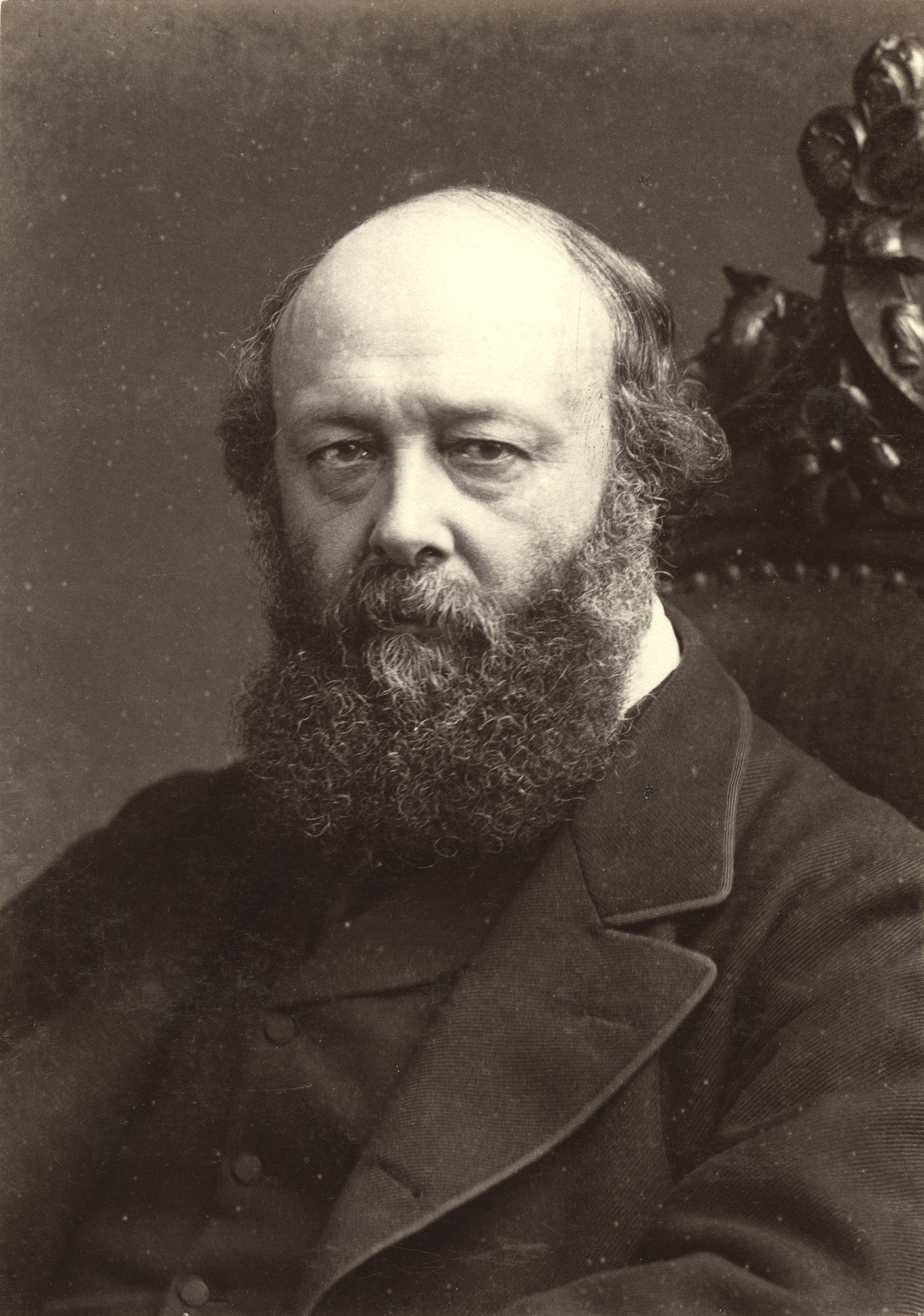

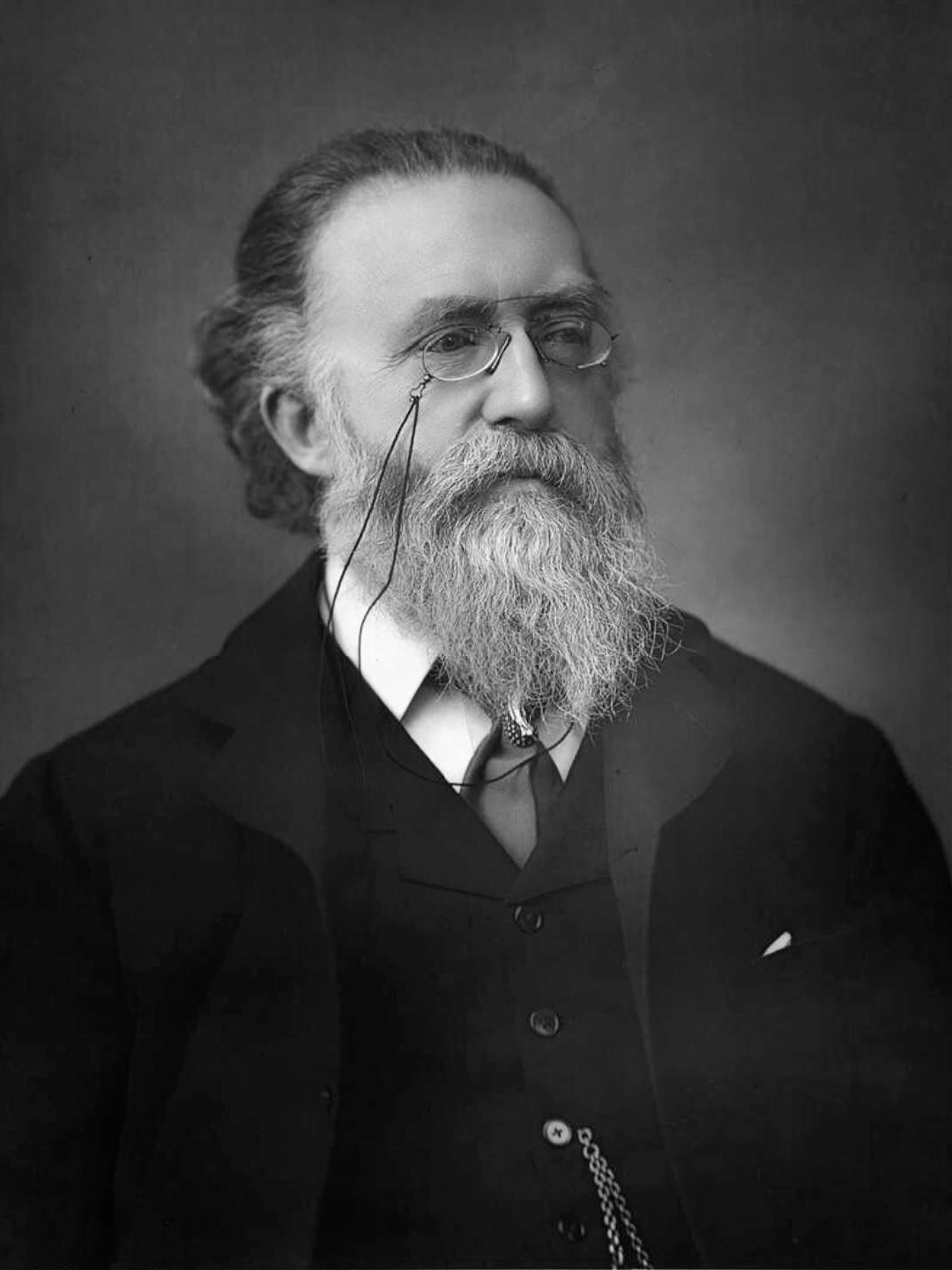

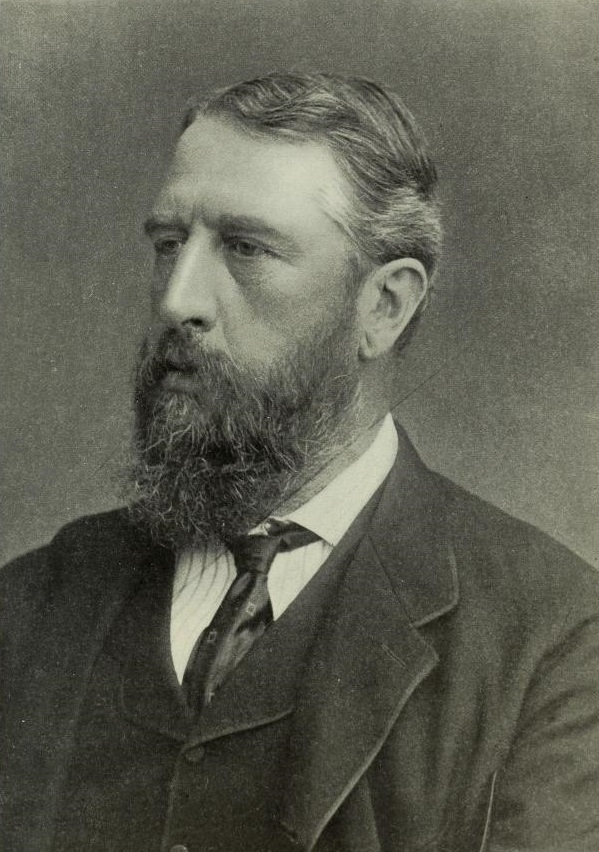

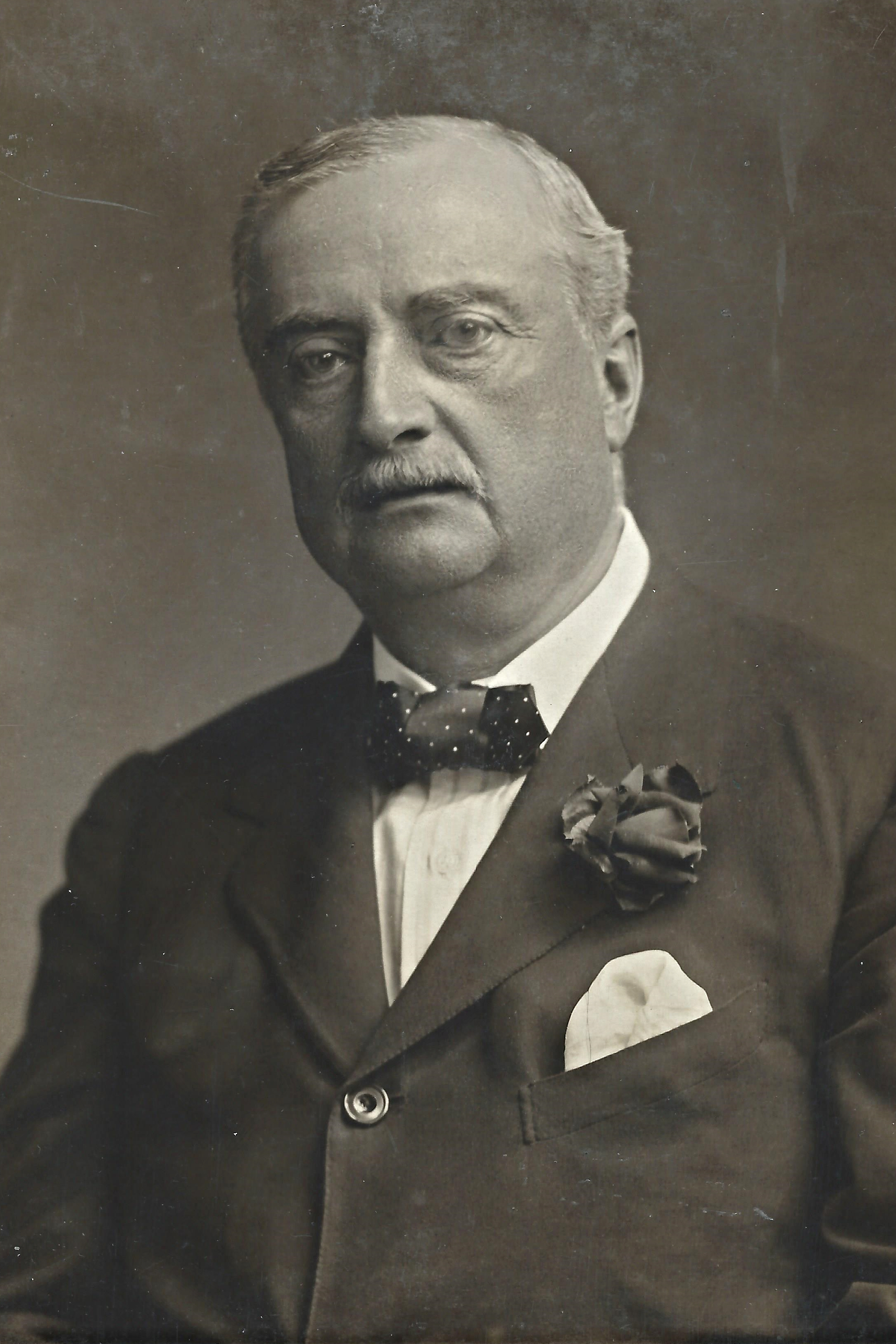
	First party	Second party	Third party
Leader	William Ewart Gladstone	Marquess of Salisbury	Justin McCarthy
Party	Liberal	Conservative	Irish National Federation
Alliance		Conservative-Liberal Unionist
Leader since	April 1880	April 1881	1891
Leader's seat	Midlothian	House of Lords	North Longford
Last election	191 seats, 45.1%	317 seats, 37.4%	Part of IPP
Seats won	271	267	72
Seat change	▲80	▼50	▲72
Popular vote	2,098,164	1,691,282	229,544
Percentage	45.4%	36.8%	5.2%
Swing	▲0.3 pp	▼0.6 pp	New party
	Fourth party	Fifth party
Leader	Duke of Devonshire	John Redmond
Party	Liberal Unionist	Irish National League
Alliance	Conservative-Liberal Unionist
Leader since	1886	October 1891
Leader's seat	House of Lords	Waterford City
Last election	77 seats, 14.0%	Part of IPP
Seats won	48 (Note: Figure includes Speaker of the House of Commons Arthur Peel in Warwick and Leamington.)	9
Seat change	▼29	▲9
Popular vote	468,729	70,287
Percentage	10.2%	1.5%
Swing	▼3.8	New party
- Colours denote the winning party

- Diagram displaying the composition of the House of Commons following the election
Prime Minister before election
Marquess of Salisbury
Conservative
Prime Minister after
election
William Ewart Gladstone
Liberal

The 1892 United Kingdom general election was held from 4 to 26 July 1892. It saw the Conservatives, led by Lord Salisbury again win the greatest number of seats, but no longer a majority as William Ewart Gladstone's Liberals won 80 more seats than in the 1886 general election. The Liberal Unionists who had previously supported the Conservative government saw their vote and seat numbers go down.

Despite being split between Parnellite and anti-Parnellite factions, the Irish Nationalist vote held up well. As the Liberals did not have a majority on their own, Salisbury refused to resign on hearing the election results and waited to be defeated in a vote of no confidence on 11 August. Gladstone formed a minority government dependent on Irish Nationalist support.

The Liberals had engaged in failed attempts at reunification between 1886 and 1887. Gladstone however was able to retain control of much of the Liberal party machinery, particularly the National Liberal Federation. Gladstone used the annual NLF meetings as a platform to consolidate various Liberal causes, particularly the Newcastle meeting of 1891, which gave its name to the radical Newcastle Programme. This programme placed Irish Home Rule first, followed by Welsh and Scottish disestablishment, reduction in factory work hours, free education, electoral reform, land reform, reform or abolition of the House of Lords, and the removal of duties on basic foods. This programme would later be disowned by the party leadership following the Liberal defeat in the 1895 election.

== Electoral system ==
Most of the MPs were elected through first-past-the-post voting in single-member districts. Conversely, 54 MPs were elected in two-seat districts by the use of plurality block voting, where each voter could cast up to two votes.

== Candidates ==
Below is a table summarising the candidates of the 1892 general election.

Affiliation	Candidates
Liberal Party	535 (Note: Includes 24 Liberal-Labour candidates.)
Conservative Party	423
Irish National Federation	87 (Note: Includes candidate T. P. O'Connor, who stood in Liverpool Scotland.)
Liberal Unionist Party	137 (Note: Includes Edward Watkin in Hythe and Edward Carson in Dublin University.)
Irish Unionist Party	48
Irish National League	43
Independent Labour	7
Independent	3 (Note: The candidates that stood were R. Ballard in Bethnal Green North East, Joseph Thomas Rushton in Worcester and John Leighton in St Pancras North.)
Independent Conservative	3 (Note: The candidates that stood were William Henry Bingham-Cox in St Albans and James Ritchie in City of London.)
Scottish Labour Party	3 (Note: The candidates that stood were James MacDonald in Dundee, Cunninghame Graham in Glasgow Camlachie and Bennet Burleigh in Glasgow Tradeston.)
Scottish United Trades Councils	3 (Note: The candidates that stood were Henry Hyde Champion in Aberdeen South, Robert Brodie in Glasgow College and Robert Chisholm Robertson in Stirlingshire.)
Social Democratic Federation	2 (Note: The candidates that stood were Hugh Robert Taylor stood in Bethnal Green North East, William Knight Hall in Salford South and Maltman Barry in Banffshire.)
Independent Nationalist	2 (Note: The candidates that stood were Philip Callan in North Louth and John O'Connor Power in West Mayo.)
Independent Liberal	2 (Note: The candidates that stood were Daniel Shilton Collin in Birmingham East and Hugh Watt in Glasgow Camlachie.)
Ind. Liberal and Direct Veto	1 (Note: Candidate Jonathan Hargrove in Houghton-le-Spring.)
Perth Independent Liberal and Radical	1 (Note: Candidate James Woollen stood in Perth.)
Kincardineshire Church Defence	1 (Note: Candidate Johnston Stephen stood in Kincardineshire.)
Scottish Socialist Federation	1 (Note: Candidate John Wilson stood in Edinburgh Central.)
Bradford Labour Union	1 (Note: Candidate Ben Tillett stood in Bradford West.)
Labour Union	1 (Note: Candidate Alexander Donald stood in Hoxton.)
Total	1,303

== Outcome ==
=== Liberal Party ===
The Liberal saw a sharp increase in seats, although a very slight 0.3% vote share increase. Nationally, although it did not hold the greatest number of seats, it managed to form a minority government with the Irish Nationalist parties. In England, the party saw an overall increase 80 seats, with 98 gains and 18 losses. Its losses mainly went to the Conservative Party and few to the Conservative's ally, the Liberal Unionists. In England, lost 13 seats by won 81 seats out that total.

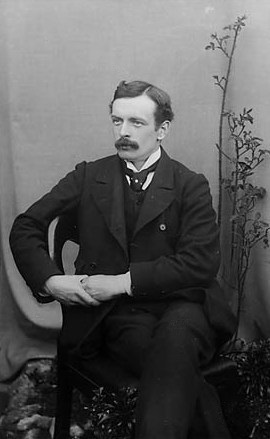
David Lloyd George

In Wales, the Liberal Party won Radnorshire and Monmouth Boroughs.

It also won the seat of Carnarvon Boroughs from the Conservatives compared to the last election. Future Prime Minister David Lloyd George had won the seat in this election by way of a retention from winning the seat in the 1890 Caernarvon Boroughs by-election following the death of Conservative MP Edmund Swetenham. Lloyd George faced his first general election as an incumbent, with his retention representing a gain from the Conservatives. It also won Swansea District and West Denbighshire from the Liberal Unionists.

In Scotland, it won Dunbartonshire, Glasgow Govan and Argyllshire from the Conservative Party. It also won Inverness Burghs, Inverness-shire, Falkirk Burghs, Ayr Burghs, South Ayrshire, Glasgow St Rollox, Roxburghshire from the Liberal Unionists.

Within the Liberal Party, Liberal-Labour candidates maintained representation for the faction within the Liberal Party overall. It once again held Bethnal Green North East, Finsbury East, Haggerston, Mid Durham, Morpeth, Wansbeck, Normanton. It also re-gained North West Norfolk, which it had lost to the Conservatives in the previous election, as well as gaining Ince. In Shipley, however, this was a gain internally from a reitring Liberal. Although, this set of candidates lost Nottingham West to the Liberal Unionists. It also retained Rhondda in Wales.

Overall, the Liberals held 271 seats, within which 11 were Liberal-Labour MPs.

=== Conservative Party ===
The Conservative Party lost 50 seats, primarily to the Liberal party. In England, however, the Conservatives won North Dorset, Walsall, Wednesbury, Wolverhampton West, Stockton-on-Tees, Hexham, Scarborough from the Liberal Party. Additionally, it won one of two seats in Newcastle-upon-Tyne and York respectively. It otherwise retained its seats in the university constituencies.

A notable politician who entered Parliament for the Conservatives was Alfred Baldwin in the seat Bewdley. He was the father to future Prime Minister (and future member for the same constituency), Stanley Baldwin.

Further, there four exchanges between Conservatives and Liberal Unionists in Wilton, Barrow and Furness, Petersfield and Lowestoft from the Liberal Unionists to the Conservatives. In Barrow and Furness, the incumbent Liberal Unionist William Sproston Caine resigned due to disputes with the party. Following a by-election wherein Caine stood as an Independent Liberal, it was won by the Liberal Party. At this election, however, it was won by a Conservative candidate. Notably, Caine, despite being an integral organiser of the Liberal Unionists in its early years, he was re-elected in Bradford East as a Liberal. Nevertheless, Barrow and Furness was again for the Conservatives against its ally. In Petersfield, incumbent Liberal Unionist, William Palmer, retired from the House of Commons, with the seat instead running Conservative William Wickham who retained the seat for the alliance, but at the expense of the Liberal Unionists at this election. In Wilton, Liberal Unionist Sir Thomas Grove, with the Conservative winning the seat with candidate Jacob Pleydell-Bouverie. In Lowestoft, Liberal Unionist Savile Crossley did not stand, with Conservative Harry Foster winning the seat. Overall, with 60 losses, but with 13 gains from the party, the Conservatives lost a total of 47 seats in England.

In Wales, it otherwise retained Denbigh Boroughs and South Monmouthshire. With the gain of one seat, but the loss of four, the Conservative Party lost a total of three seats in Wales.

In Scotland, the party held the university constituency seats of Edinburgh and St Andrews Universities and Glasgow and Aberdeen Universities. It also held the county and borough seats of East Renfrewshire, West Renfrewshire, Buteshire, Glasgow Central, South Lanarkshire, Kirkcudbright Stewartry and Wigtownshire. It also won Perth from the Liberal Party, as well as North West Lanarkshire from its prior-supported Liberal Labour MP; however, the Conservatives won the seat from a new Liberal candidate, owing to Cunninghame Graham defecting parties. However, it lost the three seats to the Liberal, thereby returning a net loss of 1 seat in Scotland.

In Ireland, the newly formed Irish Unionist Party under leader Edward James Saunderson, which had emerged from the Irish Conservative Party, saw an increase in representation from 17 seats which were held by the Irish Conservatives to 18 seats. Much like in previous elections and elections since, its support was concentrated in Ulster and dominances of the Dublin University.

=== Liberal Unionist Party ===
The Liberal Unionist Party, led by the Duke of Devonshire in the House of Lord (and Joseph Chamberlain in the House of Commons), saw a drop of around 3.8%, but with a loss of 29 seats. The party retained Bodmin, St Ives, Truro, Totnes, East Somerset, Aylesbury, South Norfolk, Sudbury, Ludlow, Wellington (Shropshire), Handsworth, St Pancras South, West Staffordshire, Wolverhampton South, Ross, Droitwich, East Worcestershire, Warwick and Leamington, West Derbyshire and Bury. It also retained one of the two seats in Bath, as well as its university constituency seat in London University, as well as its Birmingham provincial borough seats of Birmingham Bordesley, Birmingham Central, Birmingham Edgbaston, Birmingham North, Birmingham South and Birmingham West.

However, it lost to the Liberal Party and Conservatives Barnstaple, South Molton, Tavistock, Bristol North, Cirencester, Cricklade, Wilton, Woodstock, Petersfield, Islington West, Biggleswade, Mid Norfolk, Newcastle-under-Lyme, North Worcestershire, Chesterfield, Great Grimsby, Barrow and Furness, Burnley, Northwich, South East Durham, The Hartlepools, Colne Valley, Skipton. It lost its seat in Portsmouth (one of two in the constituency). It also lost Peterborough, which the Liberals had retained after winning a by-election against the Liberal Unionists. It lost Rossendale following former leader Spencer Cavendish (though still leader in the House of Lords) taking his peerage in as the Duke of Devonshire, following which the 1892 Rossendale by-election was held.

Conversely, the Liberal Unionist Party won Westminster St George's, Hanover Square, which was a gain from the Conservatives. Liberal Unionist George Goschen won the seat at the 1887 St George's, Hanover Square by-election following the resignation of Conservative Lord Algernon Percy, and retained it at this election. The represented a gain from the Conservatives nonetheless. Goschen, however, would go on to join the Carlton Club during this term in Parliament, becoming a Conservative MP before the next election. The Liberal Unionists also won from the Liberal party Lichfield, Nottingham West.

It lost both of its seats in Wales. In Swansea, Henry Vivian, who been a fomer Liberal MP who won as a Liberal Unionist in 1886, had returned to the Liberal Party. Although the Liberal Unionists ran another candidate in the seat, Cornwallis-West retained the seat but for the Liberal Party, thereby representing a gain for the Liberals. Further, in West Denbighshire, Liberal Unionist MP William Cornwallis-West was opposed by a Liberal candidate, losing his seat to the Liberal Party.

In Scotland, the Liberal Unionists saw some exchanges with the Liberal Party. It held its seats in West Perthshire, St Andrews Burghs, North Ayrshire, Glasgow Tradeston, Partick, Edinburgh West, Dumfriesshire and Peebles and Selkirk. It also won Wick Burghs, Glasgow Camlachie from the Liberal Party. In the seat of Greenock, it was initially returned that the Liberal Party had gained the seat from the Liberal Unionist's incumbent, Thomas Sutherland, winning by 44 votes. However, following an election petition, it was recounted and returned Sutherland as the MP for the seat by 55 votes. This has led to collations of Scotland to differ on whether the combined Liberal Unionist and Conservative total of seats is 19 to 20 seats amongst the county and burgh constituencies; however, sources point to the actual return due to this correction to be 20. Therefore, the party retained the seat.

In Ireland, it held South Londonderry and South Tyrone. It also gained Belfast West and Dublin St Stephen's Green amongst the territorial constituencies.

=== Watkins and Carson ===
Of dispute, however, is the candidature Edward Watkin in the seat of Hythe. Watkin had won the held initially in 1885 United Kingdom general election in England as an Independent Liberal, and defected to the Liberal Unionists at the formation of the party before the previous election. However, due to the rather erratic party loyalty of Watkin between the Liberals, the Liberal Unionists and his central parliamentary interest in his railway projects, it has been disputed as to whether he stood as an Independent Liberal or Liberal Unionists at this election. Studies have placed him standing as an Independent Liberal; however, given his tendency to take the Liberal Unionist Whip on Parliamentary votes following the election, he has been recognised as at the every least standing as a Liberal Unionist candidate and winning as such as this election.

In the Dublin University seats, both seats were retained generally by the Unionist parties. One was held by David Plunket for the Irish Unionist Party. The other was, gained by Liberal Unionist Edward Carson from the Irish Unionists. Despite Walker's initial classification of Carson as a IUP candidate, subsequent sources indicate that he entered Parliament as a Liberal Unionist. A significant cause for Conservative objections to his candidacy was his Liberal heritage, such that he likely instead stood for the election as a candidate under the Liberal Unionists where that would not be a concern.

As such, it may be so that Watkins and Carson may have at least, in part, been elected as a Liberal Unionist candidates at this election. Watkins despite his inconsistent party history and loyalties between it and the Liberals, even during his prior relationship with the Liberal Party itself; and Carson due to his Liberal history overall in Ireland, bringing the total Liberal Unionist seats from the 46 originally thought to be attributed to the party, to 48 seats (and thereby increasing the number of seats nationally shared between the Conservative Party and Liberal Unionists from 314 to 315 seats).

=== Irish Nationalists ===
This was the first general election in Ireland following the split in the Irish Parliamentary Party caused by Charles Stewart Parnell's relationship with Katharine O'Shea, who had been married at the beginning of their relationship. The ensuing scandal saw the Party split into rival wings; the anti-Parnellite Irish National Federation, and the pro-Parnellite Irish National League. Parnell later died in October 1891 of a heart attack.

In spite of the split within the Irish Nationalist parties their vote held up remarkably well, and together they received 297,294 of the 393,173 votes cast in Ireland, and 81 of Irelands 101 seats. The Irish Nationalist parties went on to support William Ewart Gladstone's attempt to form a minority Liberal government. As Prime Minister, Gladstone once again attempted to push for Irish Home Rule.

=== Labour movement ===
As party of the wider working-class movements amongst labour, several of such candidates and parties stood across the United Kingdom, including several Independent Labour candidates in England. These candidates were relatively successful, with 3 being elected in England. Independent Labour candidate Havelock Wilson won Middlesbrough from the Liberal party; however, he would go onto join the Liberal-Labour faction of the Liberal Party before the next election, rather than joining any external party. Similarly, John Burns won Battersea from the Liberal Party. He would also join the Liberal-Labour faction of the Liberal Party before the next election.

Further, from Conservative Party in the County of London, Labour organiser and candidate Keir Hardie won the seat of West Ham South, with Hardie entering Parliament for the first time in his political career. Hardie would go onto to be one of the founders and leader of the Independent Labour Party before the next election, however, it would see no success in that election.

== Results ==
The following tables are based on the collations of seats and votes collected by F. W. S. Craig for the results in Great Britain, and seats and votes collected by Brian Mercer Walker for Ireland. The distinctions made between the Conservatives, Irish Unionists and Liberal Unionists in alterations to these works are set out according to Wesley Ferris.

=== Summary of seats returned ===
Party	Leader	MPs		Aggregate votes	
Party	Leader		Of total		Of total (Note: Adjusted for multi-member constituencies.)
Conservative-Liberal Unionist	Marquess of Salisbury	315	47.0%	1,520,886	47.0%
Conservative Party	Marquess of Salisbury	249	37.2%	1,637,467	35.6%
Liberal Unionist Party	Duke of Devonshire	48 (Note: Includes Edward Watkin in Hythe and Edward Carson in Dublin University.)	7.2%	468,729	10.2%
Irish Unionist Party (Note: Stood under the Conservative Party Whip; all figures are attributed to the Conservative Party nationally.)	Edward James Saunderson	18	2.7%	53,815	1.2%
Liberal Party	William Ewart Gladstone	271 (Note: Includes 11 Liberal-Labour MPs.)	40.4%	2,098,164	45.4%
Irish National Federation	Charles Stewart Parnell	72 (Note: Includes T. P. O'Connor in Liverpool Scotland.)	10.7%	229,544	5.2%
Irish National League	John Redmond	9	1.3%	70,287	1.5%
Independent Labour	—N/a	3	0.4%	19,430	0.4%

=== Full results ===

UK General Election 1892
		Candidates						Votes		
Party	Leader	Stood	Elected	Gained	Unseated	Net	% of total	%	No.	Net %
Conservative and Liberal Unionist	Lord Salisbury	606	314	21	101	−80	46.87	46.99	2,028,586	−4.4
Liberal	William Ewart Gladstone	535	271	99	19	+80	40.44	45.37	1,958,598	+0.2
Irish National Federation	Justin McCarthy	85	72			+72	10.75	5.20	224,528	N/A
Irish National League	John Redmond	44	9			+9	1.34	1.55	67,119	N/A
Independent Labour	N/A	9	3	3	0	+3	0.45	0.51	22,198	N/A
Ind. Conservative	N/A	4	0	0	0	0	0	0.13	5,556	N/A
Independent Liberal	N/A	6	1	1	0	+1	0.15	0.08	3,572	N/A
Scottish Trades Councils	Chisholm Robertson	4	0	0	0	0	0	0.05	2,313	N/A
Ind. Nationalist	N/A	2	0	0	0	0	0	0.05	2,180	N/A
Scottish Parliamentary Labour	Keir Hardie	3	0	0	0	0	0	0.04	1,866	N/A
Social Democratic Federation	H. M. Hyndman	2	0	0	0	0	0	0.02	659	N/A
Independent	N/A	3	0	0	0	0	0	0.00	137	N/A

=== Vote summary ===
Popular vote
Liberal	45.4%
Conservative	36.8%
Liberal Unionist	10.2%
Nat. Federation	5.2%
Nat. League	1.5%
Others	0.9%

Popular vote (alliances)
Con-LU	47.0%
Liberal	45.1%
Nat. Federation	5.2%
Nat. League	1.5%
Others	0.9%

=== Seats summary ===
Parliamentary seats
Liberal	40.4%
Conservative	39.9%
Nat. Federation	10.7%
Liberal Unionist	7.2%
Nat. League	1.3%
Ind. Labour	0.4%

Parliamentary seats (alliances)
Con-LU	47.0%
Liberal	40.4%
Nat. Federation	10.7%
Nat. League	1.3%
Ind. Labour	0.4%

== See also ==
- 1892 United Kingdom general election in England
- 1892 United Kingdom general election in Ireland
- 1892 United Kingdom general election in Scotland
- 1892 United Kingdom general election in Wales
- List of United Kingdom Parliament constituencies (1885–1918) by region
- List of MPs elected in the 1892 United Kingdom general election
- List of MPs for constituencies in Wales (1892–1895)
- Parliamentary franchise in the United Kingdom 1885–1918
- 1892 United Kingdom local elections
