= 1892 Zetland County Council election =

1892 Scottish local government election

Shetland, and the various historic counties of the United Kingdom.

The second elections to Zetland County Council were held in November 1892 as part of the wider 1892 local elections. According to The Shetland Times, the elections attracted little interest. The council had twenty five seats, and 21 of these were uncontested. Seven of the unopposed councillors were new, whilst the seats of Walls South and Fetlar saw no candidates coming forward. The four seats contested were North Unst, Tingwall, Delting North, and Dunrossness.

The new council was dominated by members of Lerwick's middle class, with nine merchants, four ministers, and three solicitors. Only three councillors; Bruce, Gifford, and A J Hay, represented landed interests.

== Results by Ward ==
Candidates with an asterisk were returned incumbents.

=== Dunrossness ===
Dunrossness
Party	Candidate	Votes	%
Independent	Sinclair T Duncan*		
Independent			
Independent hold			

=== Unst North ===
North Unst
Party	Candidate	Votes	%
Independent	Charles Sandison*	71	
Independent	Laurence Edmondston	28	
Independent hold			
