= 1892 United Kingdom general election in Ireland =

General election

- 4–26 July 1892

103 seats for Ireland of the 670 seats in the House of Commons
- Turnout: 67.7% (▼12.1 pp)
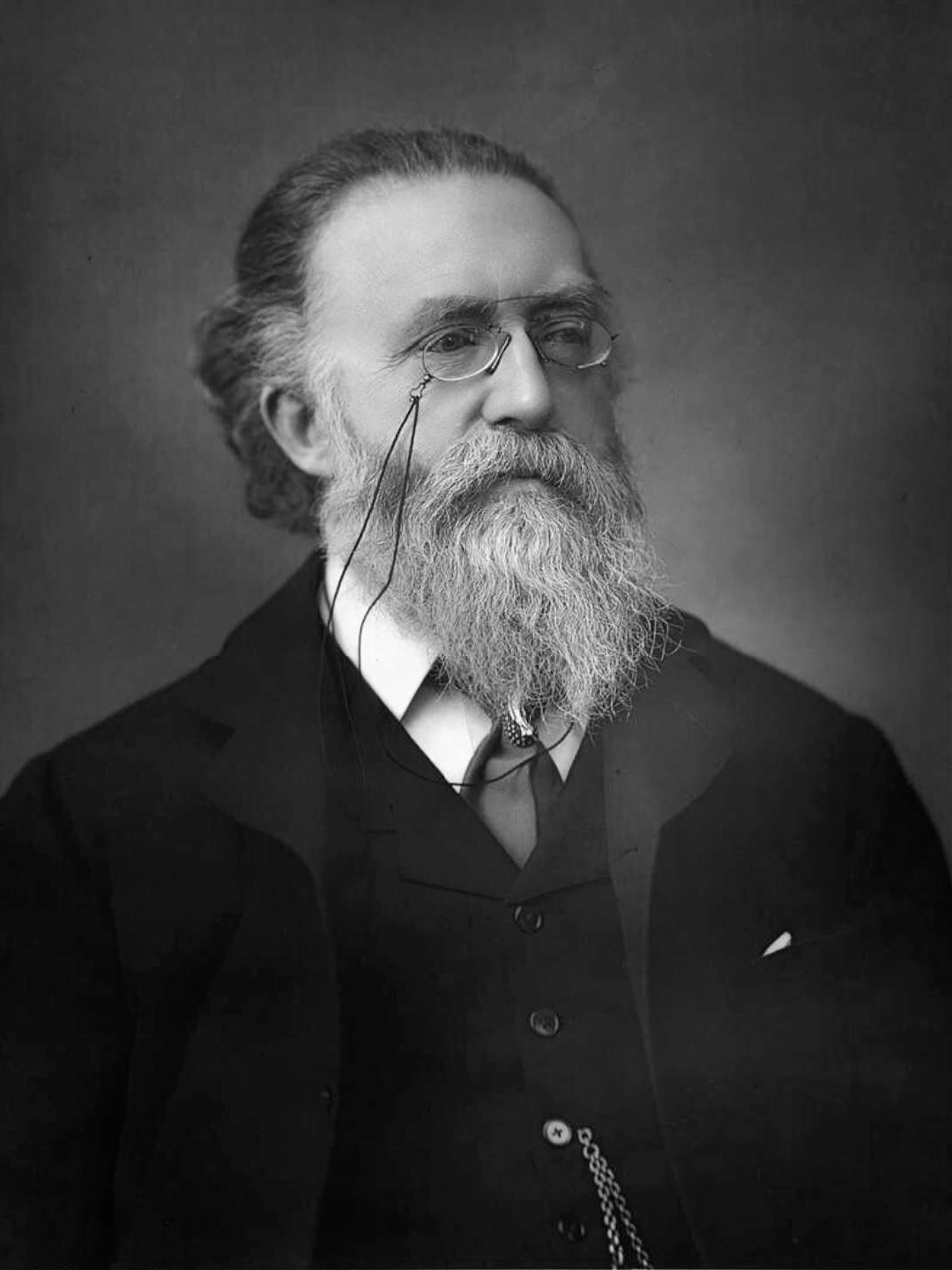

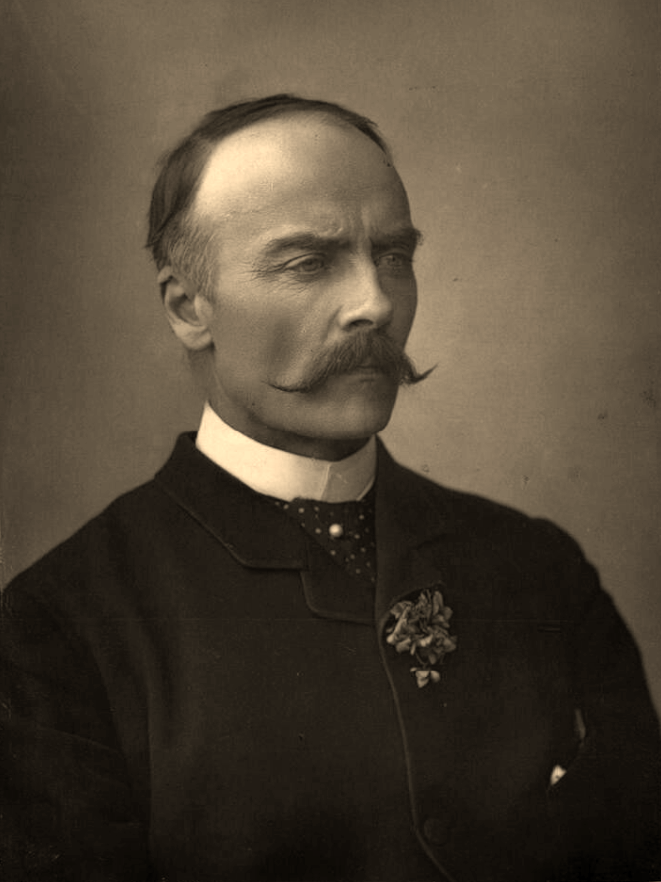

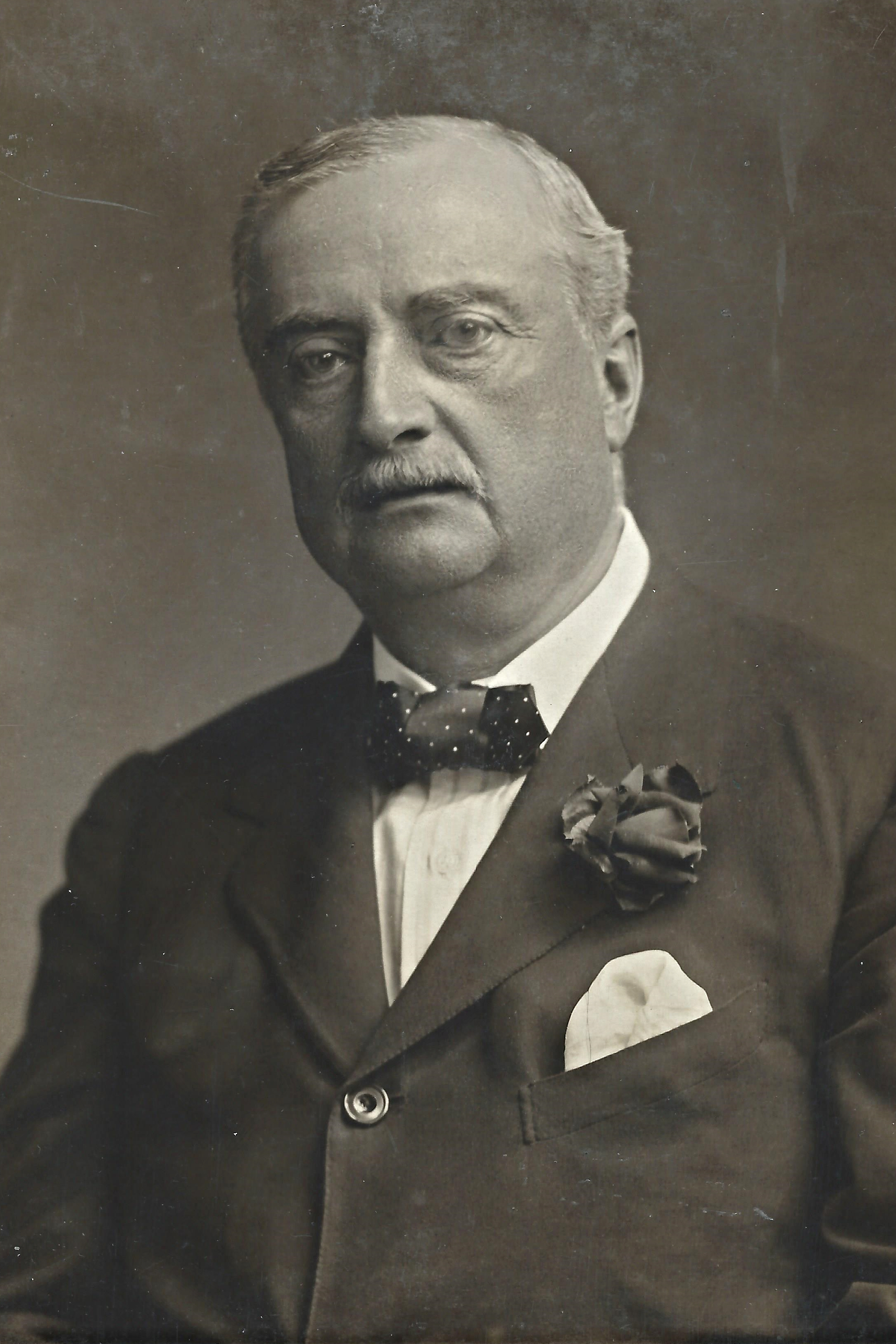

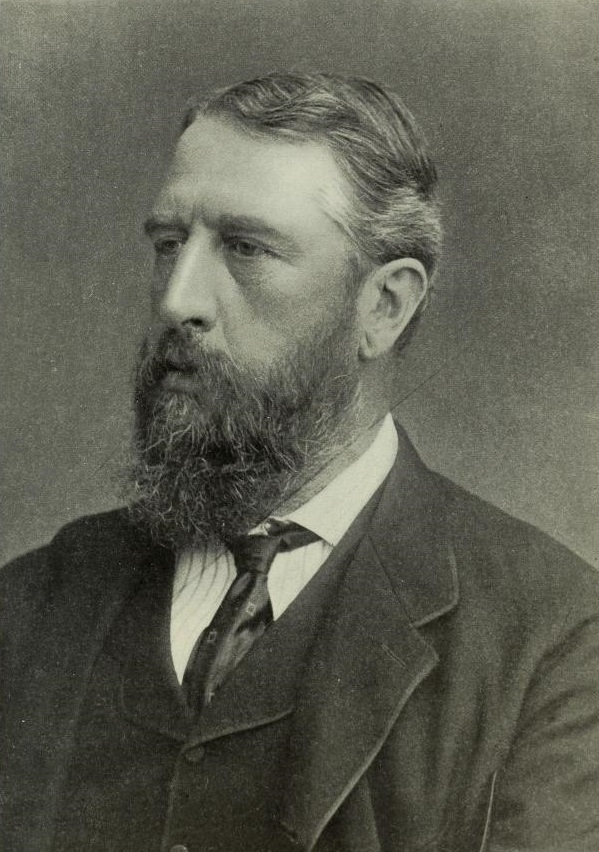
	First party	Second party
Leader	Justin McCarthy	Edward James Saunderson
Party	Irish National Federation	Irish Unionist
Alliance		Conservative-Liberal Unionist
Leader since	March 1891	1891
Leader's seat	North Longford	North Armagh
Last election	Part of IPP	17 (Note: Originated from the Irish Conservative Party.)
Seats won	71	18
Seat change	▲71	▲1
Popular vote	227,007	50,730
Percentage	59.6%	13.4%
Swing	New party	New party
	Third party	Fourth party
Leader	John Redmond	Duke of Devonshire
Party	Irish National League	Liberal Unionist
Alliance		Conservative-Liberal Unionist
Leader since	October 1891	1886
Leader's seat	Waterford City	House of Lords
Last election	Part of IPP	2 seats, 11.3%
Seats won	9	5
Seat change	▲9	▲3
Popular vote	70,287	28,497
Percentage	17.9%	7.2%
Swing	New party	▼4.1 pp
- Results of the 1892 election in Ireland

From 4 to 26 July 1892, the 1892 United Kingdom general election was held in Ireland. Of the 670 seats in the House of Commons, 103 were in Ireland; 101 represented 100 county and borough territorial constituencies, with 2 seats representing Cork City; and two additional seats represented the Dublin University wherein only graduates of the university could vote.

The election was called due to the maximum duration of Parliament of seven years under the Septennial Act 1715 coming to a close. The election saw the Liberal Party make gains from the Conservatives and Liberal Unionists.

Although the Liberal Party took the vast majority of seats in Wales, the Conservatives and its ally the Liberal Unionist Party, led by Lord Salisbury again won the greatest number of seats. However, the Conservatives and Liberal Unionists were no longer able to command a majority in the House of Commons. Salisbury refused to resign on hearing the election results and waited to be defeated in a vote of no confidence on 11 August. The Liberal Party under William Ewart Gladstone, formed a minority government dependent on Irish Nationalist support.

== Candidates ==
Below is a table summarising the candidates of the 1892 general election in Ireland, excluding those who stood in the University constituency of Dublin University.

Affiliation	Candidates
Irish National Federation	86
Irish Unionist Party	46
Irish National League	43
Liberal Unionist Party	13 (Note: The candidates stood in Belfast West, County Carlow, Dublin St Stephen's Green, East Donegal, North Donegal, South Down, South Fermanagh, South Londonderry, South Longford, South Monaghan, South Tyrone, South Wexford and West Wicklow.)
Liberal Party	5 (Note: The candidates that stood were William Huston Dodd in North Antrim, Thomas Greer in North Londonderry, James Dougherty in North Tyrone, Sir Samuel Walker in South Londonderry and Thomas Alexander Dickson in South Tyrone.)
Independent Nationalist	2 (Note: The candidates that stood were Philip Callan in North Louth and John O'Connor Power in West Mayo.)
Total	195

== Analysis ==
=== Nationalists ===
This was the first general election in Ireland following the split in the Irish Parliamentary Party caused by Charles Stewart Parnell's relationship with Katharine O'Shea, who had been married at the beginning of their relationship. The ensuing scandal saw the Party split into rival wings; the anti-Parnellite Irish National Federation, and the pro-Parnellite Irish National League. Parnell later died in October 1891 of a heart attack.

In spite of the split within the Irish Nationalist parties their vote held up remarkably well, and together they received 297,294 of the 393,173 votes cast in Ireland, and 81 of Irelands 101 seats. The Irish Nationalist parties went on to support William Ewart Gladstone's attempt to form a minority Liberal government. As Prime Minister, Gladstone once again attempted to push for Irish Home Rule.

=== Unionists and Liberal Unionists ===
The Irish Unionist Party, which stood under the Conservative Party Whip, and its parliamentary allies the Liberal Unionist Party made small gains in Ulster and around Dublin, resulting in them winning a further 4 seats. The IUP, under Edward James Saunderson, which had emerged from the Irish Conservative Party, retained the seats of the former party. The Unionists retained their northern seats of Belfast East, Belfast North, East Antrim, Mid Antrim, South Antrim, Londonderry City, North Londonderry, North Tyrone, Mid Armagh, North Armagh, East Down, North Down, West Down. The new party also gained the seat of North Fermanagh and South Dublin in the territorial constituencies.

The Liberal Unionist Party retained its seats in South Londonderry and South Tyrone. It also gained Belfast West and Dublin St Stephen's Green amongst the territorial constituencies.

In the Dublin University seats, both seats were retained by the Unionist parties. One was held by David Plunket for the Irish Unionist Party. The other was, gained by Liberal Unionist Edward Carson from the Irish Unionists. Despite Walker's initial classification of Carson as a IUP candidate, subsequent sources indicate that he entered Parliament as a Liberal Unionist.

Overall, the Unionist Party saw a gain of 2 seats, but a loss to its ally the Liberal Unionist Party, with the IUP going from holding 17 to 18 seats overall. The Liberal Unionists gained three seats, from 2 seats in its first election in 1886 to 5 seats at this election. The alliance overall held 23 seats in total out of the 103 seats in Ireland, with an overall vote share of 20.6%.

== County and borough results ==
Party	Leader	Seats					Aggregate votes		
Party	Leader	Total	Gains	Losses	Net	Of total (%)	Total	Of total (%) (Note: Adjusted for multi-member constituencies.)	Change (%)
Irish National Federation	Justin; McCarthy	71	New		▲71	70.3	227,007	59.6	New
Irish National League	John; Redmond	9	New		▲9	8.9	70,287	17.9	New
Irish Unionist	Edward James; Saunderson	17	New		▲2	16.8	50,730	13.4	New
Liberal Unionist	Duke of Devonshire	4	2	0	▲2	4.0	28,497	7.2	▼4.1
Liberal	William Ewart; Gladstone	0	0	0	Steady	—	14,472	3.7	▲0.8
Independent; Nationalist	—N/a	0	New			—	2,180	0.6	New
Total		101			0	100.0	393,173	100.0	0.0
Registered voters, and turnout							569,037 (Note: Electorate in contested constituencies. The total electorate was 740,536.)	67.7	▼12.1

=== Popular vote ===
Popular vote
Nat. Federation	59.6%
Nat. League	17.9%
Irish Unionist	13.4%
Liberal Unionist	7.2%
Liberal	3.7%
Ind. Nationalist	0.6%

Popular vote (alliances)
Nat. Federation	59.6%
Con-LU	20.6%
Nat. League	17.9%
Liberal	3.7%
Ind. Nationalist	0.6%

=== Parliament seats ===
Parliamentary seats
Nat. Federation	70.3%
Irish Unionist	16.8%
Nat. League	8.9%
Liberal Unionist	4.0%

Parliamentary seats (alliances)
Nat. Federation	70.3%
Con-LU	20.8%
Nat. League	8.9%

== Dublin University constituency result ==
Despite Walker's initial classification of Carson as a IUP candidate, subsequent sources indicate that he entered Parliament as a Liberal Unionist.

1892 general election: Dublin University (2 seats)
Party	Candidate	Votes	%	±%
Irish Unionist	David Plunket	2,188	46.6	−2.1
Liberal Unionist	Edward Carson	1,609	34.3	N/A
Irish Unionist	James Corry Jones Lowry	897	19.1	N/A
Majority		712	15.2	−31.7
Turnout		2,347 (est)	53.9 (est)	+7.8
Registered electors		4,352		
Irish Unionist hold		Swing	N/A	
Liberal Unionist gain from Irish Unionist		Swing	N/A	

== See also ==
- 1892 United Kingdom general election in England
- 1892 United Kingdom general election in Scotland
- 1892 United Kingdom general election in Wales
- List of United Kingdom Parliament constituencies (1885–1918) by region
- History of Ireland (1801–1923)
