= 1892 United Kingdom general election in Wales =

- 4–26 July 1892

All 34 Welsh seats to the House of Commons
- Turnout: 75.6% (▲1.1 pp)
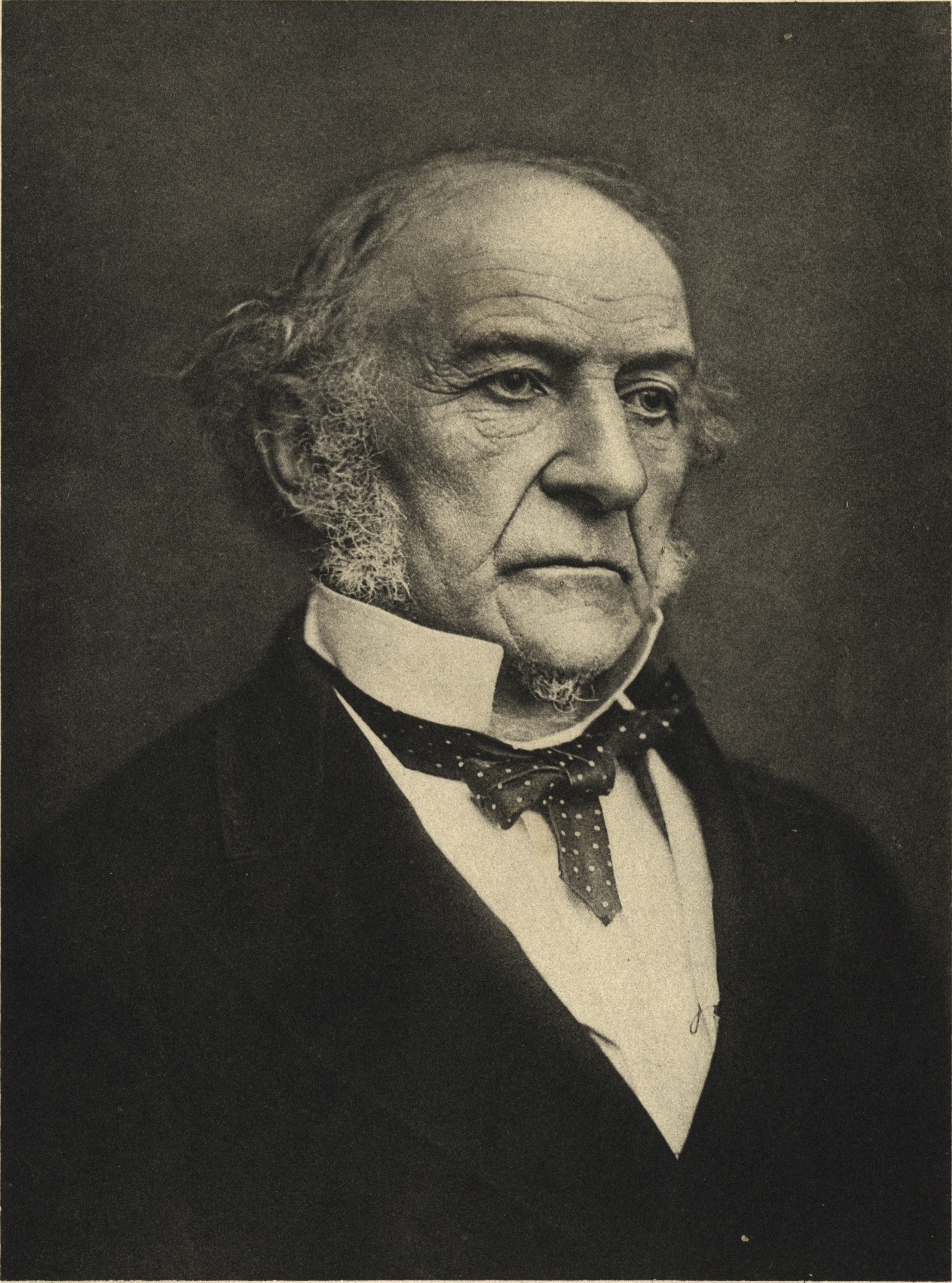

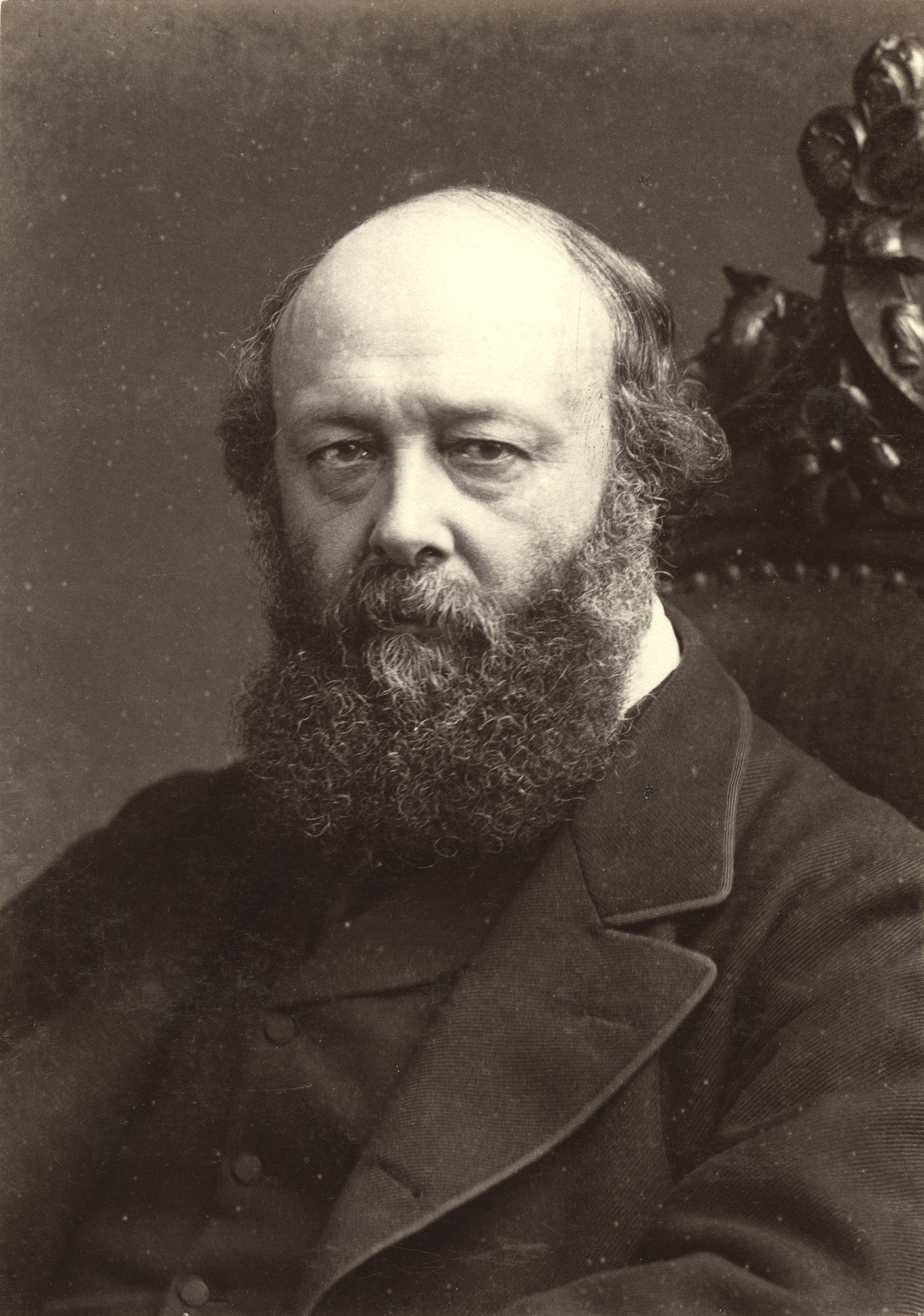

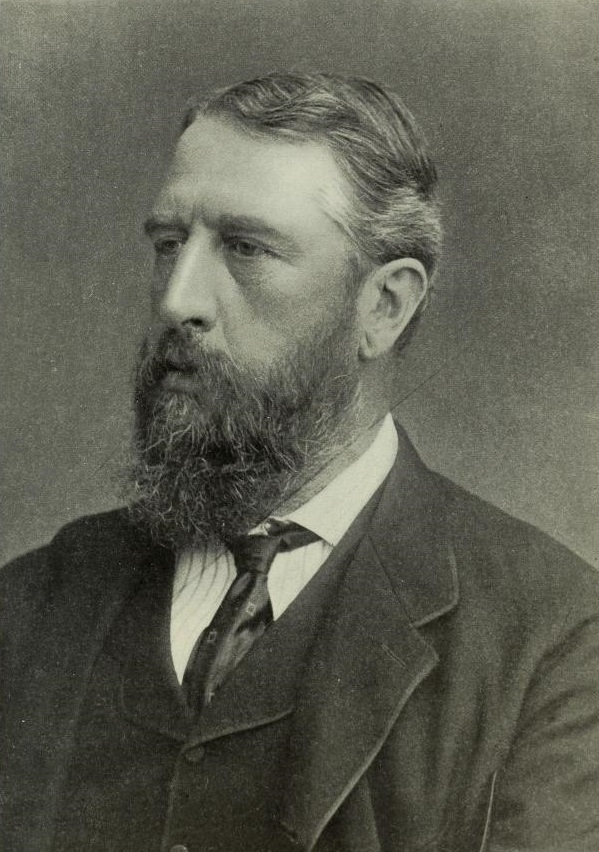
| | First party | Second party | Third party |
|---|---|---|---|
| Leader | William Ewart Gladstone | Marquess of Salisbury | Duke of Devonshire |
| Party | Liberal | Conservative | Liberal Unionist |
| Alliance | | Conservative-Liberal Unionist | Conservative-Liberal Unionist |
| Leader since | April 1880 | April 1881 | 1886 |
| Leader's seat | Midlothian | House of Lords | House of Lords |
| Last election | 26 seats, 53.9% | 6 seats, 31.1% | 2 seats, 15.0% |
| Seats won | 31 | 3 | 0 |
| Seat change | ▲5 | ▼3 | ▼2 |
| Popular vote | 141,465 | 56,692 | 21,346 |
| Percentage | 62.8% | 27.5% | 9.7% |
| Swing | ▲8.9 pp | ▼3.6 pp | ▼5.3 pp |

From 4 to 26 July 1892, the 1892 United Kingdom general election was held in Wales, to elect all 670 members of the House of Commons, with 34 seats being in Wales. 34 seats represented territorial constituencies contested under the first past the post electoral system amongst 33 constituencies.

The election was called due to the maximum duration of Parliament of seven years under the Septennial Act 1715 coming close. The election saw the Liberal Party make gains from the Conservatives and Liberal Unionists.

Although the Liberal Party held took the vast majority of seats in Wales, the Conservatives and its ally the Liberal Unionist Party, led by Lord Salisbury again won the greatest number of seats. However, the Conservatives and Liberal Unionists they were no longer able to command a majority in the House of Commons. Salisbury refused to resign on hearing the election results and waited to be defeated in a vote of no confidence on 11 August. The Liberal Party under William Ewart Gladstone, formed a minority government dependent on Irish Nationalist support.

== Candidates ==
Below is a table summarising the candidates of the 1892 general election in Wales.

| Affiliation | Candidates |
|---|---|
| Liberal Party | 34 (Note: Includes Liberal-Labour candidate William Abraham who stood in Rhondda.) |
| Conservative Party | 22 |
| Liberal Unionist Party | 7 (Note: Candidates stood in Anglesey, West Denbighshire, Flintshire, Cardiganshire, East Carmarthenshire, Carmarthen Boroughs and Cardiff.) |
| Total | 63 |

== Analysis ==
=== Liberal Party ===
Much like across the United Kingdom, the Liberal Party increased it vote share in Wales at the expense of the Conservatives and Liberal Unionists. In Wales, it increased its seats from 26 seats to 31, as well as largely increasing its vote share majority to 62.8%.

The Liberal Party retained the seats of Anglesey, Arfon, Eifion, East Denbighshire, Flint Boroughs, Flintshire, Merioneth, Montgomeryshire, Breconshire, Cardiganshire, Carmarthen Boroughs, East Carmarthenshire, West Carmarthenshire, Pembrokeshire, Cardiff, East Glamorganshire, Rhondda, Mid Glamorganshire, South Glamorganshire, Gower, Swansea Town, North Monmouthshire and West Monmouthshire. The party also held both seats in the two-member constituency of Merthyr Tydfil.

The Liberal Party won the seat of Carnarvon Boroughs from the Conservatives compared to the last election. Future Prime Minister David Lloyd George had won the seat in this election by way of a retention from winning the seat in the 1890 Caernarvon Boroughs by-election following the death of Conservative MP Edmund Swetenham.

=== Conservatives and Liberal Unionists ===
The Liberal Party also won four more seats from the Conservative Party and its ally, the Liberal Unionist Party. The Conservative Party lost Pembroke and Haverfordwest, Radnorshire and Monmouth Boroughs. However, the Conservatives won Montgomery which it had lost in previous election. The Conservative Party otherwise retained Denbigh Boroughs and South Monmouthshire. With the gain of one seat, but the loss of four, the Conservative Party lost a total of three seats in Wales.

The Liberal Unionists under leader the Duke of Devonshire (and Joseph Chamberlain in the House of Commons) suffered losses across the country, including 2 seats to the Liberal Party in Wales. It also suffered a drop in vote share, and with its Welsh seats facing Liberal opponents where each had previous succeeded in 1886 by running unopposed. In Swansea District, Henry Vivian, who been a fomer Liberal MP who won as a Liberal Unionist in 1886, had returned to the Liberal Party. Although the Liberal Unionists ran another candidate in the seat, Cornwallis-West retained the seat but for the Liberal Party, thereby representing a gain for the Liberals. Further, in West Denbighshire, Liberal Unionist MP William Cornwallis-West was opposed by a Liberal candidate, losing his seat to the Liberal Party.

Other former liberals ran as Liberal Unionists in Wales, however were unsuccessful. Sir Robert Cunliffe unsuccessfully ran in Flintshire, with Morgan Lloyd contesting Anglesey and John Jones Jenkins once again in Carmarthen Boroughs. Consequently, the Liberal Unionists were without representation in Wales following the election.

== Results ==
| Party | Seats | | | | | Aggregate votes | | |
| Party | Total | Gains | Losses | Net | Of total (%) | Total | Of total (%) (Note: Adjusted for multi-member constituencies.) | Change (%) |
|---|---|---|---|---|---|---|---|---|
| Liberal | 31 (Note: Includes Liberal-Labour MP William Abraham in Rhondda.) | 6 | 1 | ▲5 | 91.2 | 70,289 | 62.8 | ▲8.9 |
| Conservative-Liberal Unionist | 3 | 1 | 6 | ▼5 | 8.8 | 78,038 | 37.2 | ▼8.9 |
| Conservative | 3 | 1 | 4 | ▼3 | 8.8 | 56,692 | 27.5 | ▼3.6 |
| Liberal Unionist | 0 | 0 | 2 | ▼2 | — | 21,346 | 9.7 | ▼5.3 |
| Total | 34 | | | 0 | 100.0 | 219,503 | 100.0 | 0.0 |
| Registered voters, and turnout | | | | | | 274,637 (Note: Electorate in contested constituencies. The total electorate was 314,647.) | 75.6 | ▲1.1 |

=== Popular vote ===
Popular vote
| Liberal | 62.8% |
| Conservative | 27.5% |
| Liberal Unionist | 9.7% |

Popular vote (alliances)
| Liberal | 62.8% |
| Con-LU | 37.2% |

=== Parliament seats ===
Parliament seats
| Liberal | 91.2% |
| Conservative | 8.8% |

Parliament seats (alliances)
| Liberal | 91.2% |
| Con-LU | 8.8% |

== See also ==
- 1892 United Kingdom general election in England
- 1892 United Kingdom general election in Ireland
- 1892 United Kingdom general election in Scotland
- List of United Kingdom Parliament constituencies (1885–1918) by region
- List of MPs for constituencies in Wales (1892–1895)
