= Stirling Miners' County Union =

Scottish trade union

The Stirling Miners County Union was a trade union representing coal miners in the Stirlingshire area of Scotland.

The union originated the Stirlingshire, Forth and Clyde Valley Miners' Association. Founded in 1886, it was initially led by Chisholm Robertson and in 1894 was a founder constituent of the Scottish Miners' Federation. However, it withdrew the following year after Robertson fell out with the leadership of the Federation over strike pay. William Webb took over as secretary, but membership fell from 3,000 to only 800 and in 1899 the Stirlingshire miners reconstituted their union separately from the Forth and Clyde Valley miners.

Although the Stirling Miners County Union initially had only 342 members, it reached a peak membership of 7,500 in 1910. In 1945, it was merged with other unions to form the Stirling and Lothians Area of the National Union of Mineworkers.

== Secretaries ==
1886: Chisholm Robertson
1896: William Webb
c.1920: James Barbour
