= Annie Marland =

British trade unionist

Ann Bucklie Marland (22 November 1861 – 1947) was a British trade unionist.

Born in the Knott Lanes area of Ashton-under-Lyne, Marland moved with her family to Mossley and began working in a cotton mill at the age of ten. She worked in the cardroom for eighteen years, and became increasingly interested in trade unionism.

In 1889, Marland was a founder member of the Mossley Women's Liberal Association, and soon became its secretary, hoping it would further trade unionism. In 1889, she attended a Women's Liberal Federation conference in London, where there was a motion calling for the formation of all-women trade unions. Marland spoke in opposition to the motion, which was defeated, and this brought her to the attention of Emilia Dilke, president of the Women's Trade Union League (WTUL). Dilke employed Marland as the league's national organiser, giving speeches around the country, and lobbying the government on various issues.

Marland met Robert Brodie in 1895, and changed her surname to "Marland-Brodie". She continued to travel the country until around 1900, when she and Robert settled in London, but due to illness in 1902 she began working only part-time for the WTUL, also serving on its general committee. She devoted significant time to organising jute workers in Dundee in 1906 and 1907, but thereafter spent less time on her trade union interests.

The couple moved to Essex, then in 1912 to Quebec City, where she became the president of the Women's League. In 1917, they moved to Baltimore, where Marland was active in the Red Cross, and then after World War I they moved to Tampa, Florida, where she was involved in the local Women's Club. Brodie died in 1939, but Marland remained in Tampa until her death in 1947.
