= Robert Brodie =

Scottish trade unionist and political activist

Robert Brodie (died 1939) was a Scottish trade unionist and political activist.

Born in Edinburgh, Brodie became a flint glass worker and was active in the Flint Glass Makers' Sick and Friendly Society. From 1888, he represented the society on Glasgow Trades Council, and he also joined both the Scottish Labour Party and the Scottish United Trades Councils Labour Party. In 1891, he stood for Glasgow School Board for the latter party.

Brodie stood in Glasgow College at the 1892 United Kingdom general election. Although generally considered to be a Trades Councils Labour candidate, given his affiliation with the Scottish Labour Party, there is some uncertainty on this. He took only 221 votes, and was not elected. Following the election, he struggled to find work, and moved to Manchester, where he became active in the new Independent Labour Party, and eventually found work as a manager at Birtwistle and Tate's Glass Works. He began a relationship with Annie Marland, the two having met through their shared interest in women's trade unionism, and the two married in 1895.

Around 1900, Brodie and Marland moved to London, where Brodie worked as a journalist, and also began studying law. In 1912, they moved to Quebec City, Brodie becoming an instructor in musketry with the Canadian Militia, and worked at the Ross Rifle Factory during World War I. He was relocated to Baltimore in 1917, as an inspector of aeronautic supplies, and decided to remain in the country after the war, settling in Tampa, Florida, where he qualified as a lawyer.
