= Scottish Socialist Federation =

Scottish political party

- Abbreviation: SSF
- Founded: December 1888
- Dissolved: 1898
- Merged into: Social Democratic Federation
- Headquarters: Edinburgh
- Newspaper: Labour Chronicle
- Ideology: Socialism
- Political position: Left-wing

The Scottish Socialist Federation was a Scottish political party founded by supporters of the Social Democratic Federation in Edinburgh in December 1888.

In the 1892 general election, the party were leading supporters of the Scottish United Trades Councils Labour Party. It affiliated to the Independent Labour Party in 1893. In 1894, the party began publishing the Labour Chronicle. From 1895 to 1896, James Connolly was the party secretary, and he contested local elections for the group. The group was still active in 1898, but it ultimately merged into the Social Democratic Federation.
