= Scottish Labour Party (1888) =

Former left-wing political party in Scotland

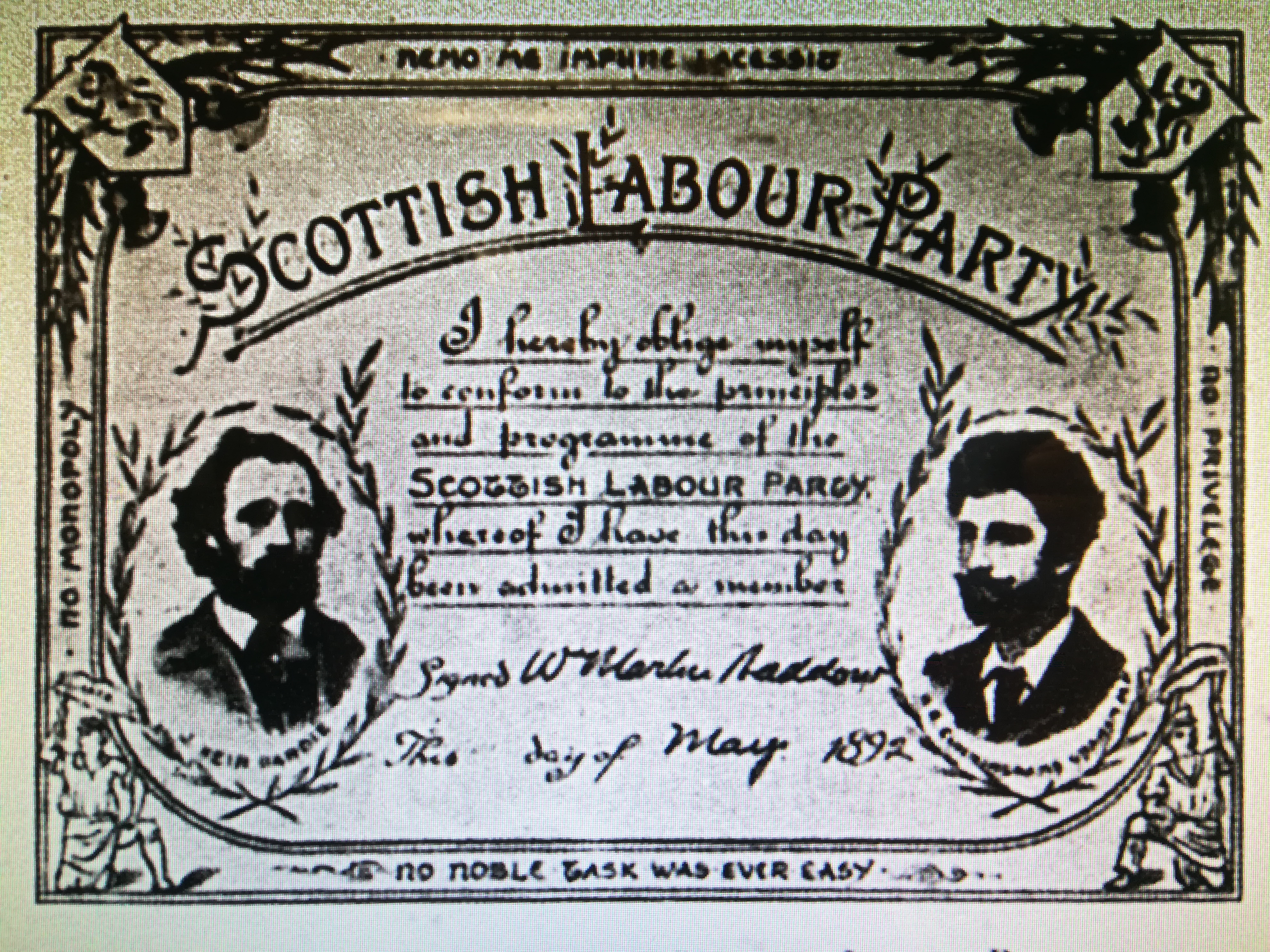
- President: Robert Bontine Cunninghame Graham
- Secretary-General: Keir Hardie
- Founder: Robert Bontine Cunninghame Graham; Keir Hardie
- Founded: 25 August 1888
- Dissolved: 1895
- Split from: Scottish Land Restoration League
- Merged into: Independent Labour Party
- Succeeded by: Scottish Labour
- Ideology: Socialism; Nationalisation; Home rule Georgism
- Political position: Left-wing
- Slogan: No Noble Task Was Ever Easy

The Scottish Labour Party (SLP), also known as the Scottish Parliamentary Labour Party, was formed by Robert Bontine Cunninghame Graham, the first socialist MP in the Parliament of the United Kingdom, who later went on to become the first president of the Scottish National Party, and Keir Hardie, who later became the first leader of the Independent Labour Party and the Labour Party.

== History ==
The initial spur for the party's foundation was Hardie's unsuccessful independent Labour candidature in the 1888 Mid Lanarkshire by-election. He had tried and failed to gain Liberal Party support for his candidature, and the experience convinced many of his fellow miners of the need for an independent party representing the interests of labour. The cause also appealed to some radicals, and his movement gained the support of the Dundee Radical Association. Like many of the party's initial members, Hardie had previously been involved in the Scottish Land Restoration League.

A preliminary meeting was held in Glasgow in May, and a foundation conference was held on 25 August. This was chaired by Cunninghame Graham, while other attendees included Irish nationalist politician John Ferguson, crofter John Murdoch, land reformer Shaw Maxwell and miners' leader Robert Smillie. However, the organised socialist movement was not initially involved; both the Social Democratic Federation and the Socialist League boycotted the event. The diverse factions had very different perspectives on the party's future, but were able to agree a programme, largely based on a draft by Hardie.

Hardie became the party's Secretary, while George Mitchell was the first Treasurer and Cunninghame Graham was the President.

=== Dispute ===
R B Cunninghame Graham, a strong supporter of Scottish independence, was the party's main MP, for the North West Lanarkshire constituency, between his defection from the Liberal Party in 1888 and his defeat in the United Kingdom general election 1892, in the Glasgow Camlachie constituency. Two other MPs, Gavin Clark and Charles Conybeare, held honorary offices in the party until January 1893. Following their departure, with many of the other radicals, the party declared itself in favour of socialism, and prohibited officials (but not other members) from dual membership with other political parties. The party ran two other candidates in 1892: J. Bennett Burleigh in Glasgow Tradeston and James MacDonald in Dundee. Attempts by Cunninghame Graham and Shaw Maxwell to arrange a non-contest pact with the Liberals failed, and the SLP candidates did not poll well.

=== Dissolution ===
The party initially supported Henry Hyde Champion's trades council movement, but became concerned when it formed the Scottish United Trades Councils Labour Party under the secretaryship of Chisholm Robertson, presenting itself as a potential rival to the Scottish Labour Party. However, Champion's movement soon faded, while it did serve to move some trades councils to a position supporting independent labour candidates, and closer co-operation with the Scottish Labour Party.

In 1894, Hardie became President of the new Independent Labour Party (ILP), and the vast majority of Scottish Labour Party members supported him. In early 1895 the SLP dissolved itself into the ILP.

== Election results ==
=== 1892 UK general election ===
Constituency	Candidate	Votes	Percentage	Position
Dundee	James MacDonald	354	1.3	5
Glasgow Camlachie	Robert Cunninghame-Graham	906	11.9	3
Glasgow Tradeston	Bennet Burleigh	783	10.7	3
