= List of MPs for constituencies in Wales (1892–1895) =

- 4–26 July 1892

This is a list of Members of Parliament elected to the Parliament of the United Kingdom between the 1892 United Kingdom general election and the 1895 United Kingdom general election.

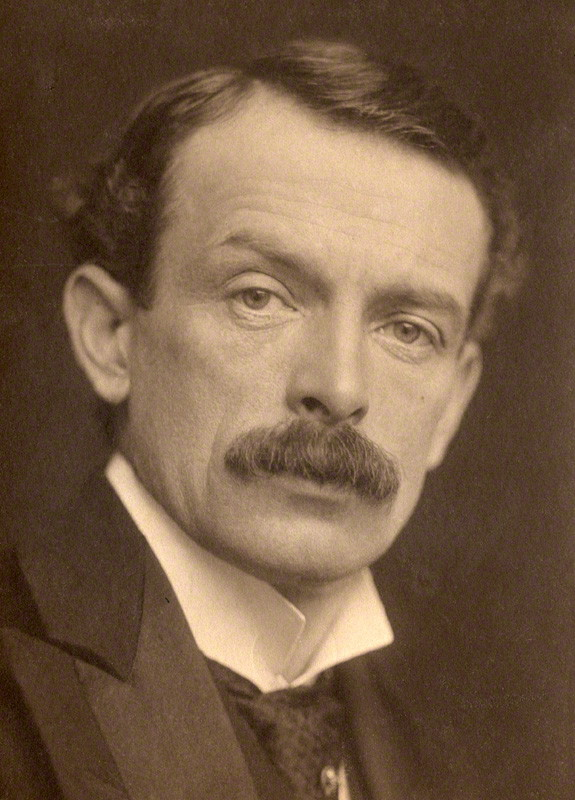
David Lloyd George AS

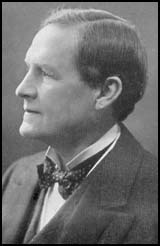
David Alfred Thomas AS

== List of members of parliament ==
- William Abraham
- Charles Francis Egerton Allen
- Robert John Dickson Burnie
- William Rees Morgan Davies
- Francis Edwards
- Thomas Edward Ellis
- Samuel Thomas Evans
- Evan Rowland Jones
- George Thomas Kenyon
- John Herbert Lewis
- Arthur Humphreys-Owen (from 1894)
- Frederick Courtenay Morgan
- John Lloyd Morgan
- George Osborne Morgan
- William Pritchard Morgan
- William Fuller-Maitland
- David Lloyd George
- Thomas Lewis
- Thomas Phillips Price
- Pryce Pryce-Jones
- William Rathbone
- David Randell
- Edward James Reed
- Stuart Rendel (until 1894)
- John Herbert Roberts
- John Bryn Roberts
- William Bowen Rowlands
- Samuel Smith
- Albert Spicer
- Alfred Thomas
- Abel Thomas
- David Alfred Thomas
- Henry Hussey Vivian (until 1893)
- Cornelius Marshall Warmington
- William Williams (from 1893)
- Arthur John Williams

== See also ==
- 1892 United Kingdom general election
- 1892 United Kingdom general election in Wales
