= Scottish United Trades Councils Labour Party =

- Secretary: Robert Chisholm Robertson
- Founded: 8 August 1891
- Dissolved: March 1893
- Merged into: Independent Labour Party
- Ideology: Socialism; Trade unionism Democratic socialism Nationalisation
- Political position: Left-wing
- National affiliation: Scottish Labour Party

The Scottish United Trades Councils Labour Party, also known as the Scottish Trades Councils Independent Labour Party, was a Scottish labour party.

The party originated in a meeting held in Edinburgh on 8 August 1891 with representatives of various trades councils and local labour organisations. 67 delegates attended, claiming to represent 84,500 members. The meeting agreed to sponsor the Parliamentary and local candidacies of labour movement activists who were independent of both the Conservative Party and of the Liberal Party. Keir Hardie convinced the meeting to also campaign for the payment of MPs and councillors. The meeting established an executive, with one representative of each trades council, plus a member of the Scottish Labour Party. R. Chisholm Robertson, a miner from Stirlingshire and a rival of Hardie, was appointed as Secretary.

The executive attempted to form local labour representation committees, based on the membership of the trades councils. This was sufficiently successful that a national movement known as the "Scottish United Trades Councils Labour Party" was established. Its platform included calls for an eight-hour day, universal suffrage, land nationalisation and limited industrial nationalisation, and a local option on temperance. However, the new party agreed not to sponsor any candidates where there was a chance that a Conservative might beat a Liberal or a radical.

At the 1892 general election, the party sponsored four candidates: John Wilson in Edinburgh Central, Robert Brodie in Glasgow College, Chisholm Robertson in Stirlingshire and Henry Hyde Champion in Aberdeen South. Between them, the candidates won 2,313 votes. The party also actively supported nine left-wing Liberal candidates, including one Crofter. Some of the candidates were also sponsored by the Scottish Socialist Federation.

The party organised a further conference after the election, presided over by Cunninghame-Graham. It sponsored two candidates for local elections in Glasgow. That year, the Independent Labour Party was formed, and in March the party dissolved, advising members and branches to affiliate to the new organisation, which many did.

In late 1893, Henry Hyde Champion attempted to reform the party as part of a disagreement with Hardie, but the Scottish Labour Party firmly opposed this, and the venture was a complete failure.

== Election results ==
=== 1892 UK general election ===
Constituency	Candidate	Votes	Percentage	Position
Aberdeen South	Henry Hyde Champion	991	15.8	3
Edinburgh Central	John Wilson	434	7.3	3
Glasgow College	Robert Brodie	225	2.1	3
Stirlingshire	Robert Chisholm Robertson	663	6.3	3
