= Robert Chisholm Robertson =

Robert Chisholm Robertson (1861 - March 1930) was a Scottish political activist.

Born in Limerigg, then in Stirlingshire, Robertson started working in a coal mine at the age of eight, but after the Mines Regulation Act 1872 prohibited children working underground, he returned to school. He returned to mining aged thirteen, and through studying at night school, he and his brother both obtained mine manager's certificates. His brother later became superintendent of mines for Charles Brooke, Rajah of Sarawak, while Chisholm Robertson turned to trade unionism. In 1886, he was elected as the first secretary of the Forth and Clyde Valley Miners' Association, serving until 1896, and also President of the Scottish Miners' National Association. He was on the first executive of the Miners Federation of Great Britain, founded in 1889, while in 1894, he was the founding secretary of the Scottish Miners' Federation. Robertson co-authored an influential labour programme with Keir Hardie in the first issue of The Miner, used in his Mid Lanarkshire by-election campaign, but he fell out with Hardie two years later, accusing him of neglecting mining issues at the expense of supporting seamen.

Chisholm Robertson was also active on Glasgow Trades Council, and was the secretary of the Scottish United Trades Councils Labour Party. He stood for the party in Stirlingshire at the 1892 general election, but was not elected, taking only 663 votes. The following year, he was the party's delegate to the founding conference of the Independent Labour Party, and he was elected to the new organisation's first National Administrative Council. In the mid-1890s, Robert Smillie successfully challenged him for the secretaryship of the local Miners' Association, prompting Robertson to emigrate to Australia.

Robertson returned from Australia and started a business in Glasgow, using his spare time to write in support of Christian fundamentalism and arguing that trade unions should avoid all potentially political issues. Even after his retirement, he continued to write letters to newspapers attacking Smillie.

Trade union offices
Preceded by New position	Secretary of the Stirlingshire, Forth and Clyde Valley Miners' Association; 1886–1895	Succeeded by William Webb
Preceded by New position	President of the Scottish Miners' Federation; 1894–c.1896	Succeeded by Robert Brown
