= 1892 United Kingdom local elections =

Wikimedia template

The 1892 United Kingdom local elections took place throughout 1892. The elections were the second following the Local Government Act 1888 and Local Government (Scotland) Act 1889, which had established county councils and county borough councils in England, Wales, and Scotland. The election saw elections of members to these various new county councils.

The March elections saw Liberal Progressives strengthening their control of London County Council. The result strengthened the opposition of some Conservatives to female suffrage, as a correlation between widening female suffrage and the Conservative defeat was read into the election.

Municipal elections were held in England and Wales in November, although like their County Council elections remained generally apolitical.

The elections also witnessed the further growth of the Labour movement in local government, with there being an estimated 200 Labour councillors by 1892, as opposed to 12 Labour councillors in 1882.
