= 1892 vote of no confidence in the Salisbury ministry =

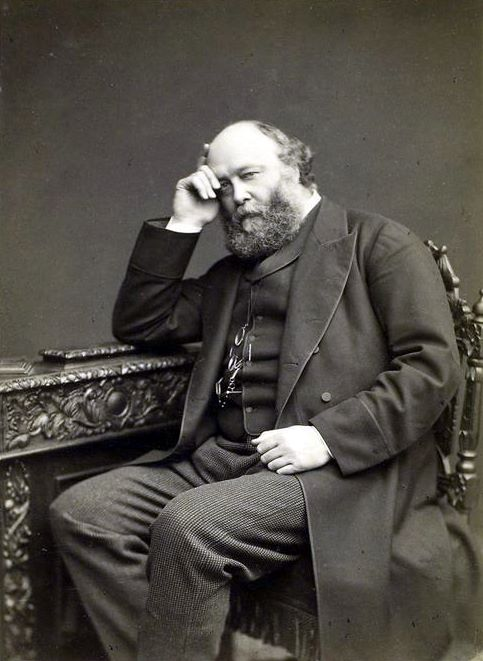
Marquess of Salisbury

The vote of no confidence in the second Salisbury ministry occurred when the Conservative government of Robert Cecil, the Marquess of Salisbury decided to meet Parliament after the general election despite not winning a majority. The government presented a Queen's Speech, but was defeated on 11 August 1892 when the House of Commons carried by 350 to 310 an amendment moved by the opposition Liberal Party declaring that Her Majesty's "present advisers" did not possess the confidence of the House. After the vote Salisbury resigned and Liberal Party leader William Ewart Gladstone became Prime Minister for the fourth time.

== Background ==
With polling in the general election taking place over several weeks, the state of play with regard to party gains could be monitored each day. The Times noted that as the Conservatives and Liberal Unionists together had a majority of 66 in the outgoing House, it would take 33 net seat gains by the Gladstonian side to win (which counted Liberals together with Liberal-Labour members, and Irish Nationalists whether supporters or opponents of Charles Stewart Parnell). The result of elections up to 11 July gave the Liberals 31 gains, and on 12 July the Gladstonians made further progress to reach a total of 36 net gains.The Times Leader column noted that the leading Liberal Sir William Harcourt had begun estimating the size of the eventual Gladstonian majority, although the Irish did not class themselves as such and that a majority dependent on their support would not be stable.

With almost all election results known, on 21 July The Times noted that it was for William Ewart Gladstone to succeed "in uniting, for the moment, the multifarious elements of the motley majority against the Government, to shape that advice so as to compel LORD SALISBURY's resignation". When returns from all seats came in, the Gladstonian Liberals had 272 seats, with their likely allies bringing them up to 355, while the Conservatives and Liberal Unionists had 315. As the Liberal Party did not have a majority of seats on its own, the Prime Minister the Marquess of Salisbury did not immediately offer his resignation.

On 3 August, Gladstone met with the Anti-Parnellite leaders Justin McCarthy and John Dillon, agreeing that the no confidence motion should be put as soon as possible (preferably on Tuesday 9 August) and that there would be only one or two speeches in the debate from the Anti-Parnellite side. The much smaller Parnellites were determined to maintain their independence of other parties, and a resolution to this effect was passed when the Irish National League met in Dublin on 4 August. Both groups determined to continue to sit on the opposition side of the House after a change of government, but it was always clear that they intended to support the no confidence motion.

== Parliament meets ==
On 4 August the new Parliament met for the House of Commons to elect a Speaker. Sir Matthew White Ridley (Conservative MP for Blackpool) proposed, and William Gladstone seconded, the re-election of Arthur Peel who had been in office for the past eight years, and the proposal was unanimously agreed. On 8 August the Queen's speech was delivered, read by Commission by the Lord Chancellor, the Earl of Halsbury. The "brief and colourless" speech was confined to formally opening the new session, as it asserted that "the business of the Session was completed .. prior to dissolution."

== No confidence motion ==
When the House of Commons met that afternoon, Unionist backbenchers Dunbar Barton and William Henry Cross moved and seconded the 'loyal address' thanking the Queen for the speech. Barton noted that some had suggested that Salisbury ought to have resigned immediately it became obvious he had lost the election, and also that Liberals did not want to have a prolonged discussion on their vote of no confidence. As an Irish Unionist member he defended the government's policy on Ireland. H. H. Asquith then moved an amendment to add the words:

That we feel it, however, to be our duty humbly to submit to Your Majesty that it is essential that Your Majesty's Government should possess the confidence of this House and of the Country, and respectfully to represent to Your Majesty that such confidence is not reposed in the present Advisers of Your Majesty.

The debate on the amendment occupied three full days of Parliamentary time, on Monday 8, Tuesday 9 and Thursday 11 August. Special arrangements had to be made for the eventual vote because the issue was crucial, which was the reason the House did not sit on Wednesday.

== Division ==
The vote was called at midnight on 11 August. The Times reported that there was a "scene of great excitement", and owing to the large number of Members of Parliament voting it took more than 25 minutes to count. Both Arthur Balfour and William Gladstone were cheered by their parties, with Gladstone being greeted by his supporters waving their hats. The result was announced by Liberal MP Arnold Morley:

Aye votes	350
No votes	310

The announcement produced even more cheers and shouts of "Remember Mitchelstown!"

With 665 Members of Parliament taking part (the 660 voting, two tellers from each side and the Speaker in the Chair), the no confidence vote of 1892 was later acknowledged as the 'greatest division' of all time in the House of Commons in the sense of having the most Members taking part. The full House of Commons had 670 seats but two were vacant at the time (Holborn, where Gainsford Bruce had been made a Judge, and Cork North East which had been declined by William O'Brien in preference to Cork City when he had been elected to both). Only three Members did not vote. Thomas Bartholomew Curran (Kilkenny City, Anti-Parnellite) was absent in Australia, while Arthur Winterbotham (Cirencester, Liberal) and John Lloyd Wharton (Ripon, Conservative) were both ill and were 'paired' with each other. The Times had successfully forecast the result of the vote on the morning of Wednesday 10 August.

== Change of government ==
On Saturday 13 August, the Marquess of Salisbury arrived to see Queen Victoria at Osborne House on the Isle of Wight, where he tendered his resignation. The Court Circular recorded that the Queen had accepted it "with much regret". Gladstone arrived on Monday 15 August to kiss hands and take office for the fourth time.
