= Tom Brown (anarchist) =

British anarchist (1900–1974)

- Born: 1900; Newcastle upon Tyne, England
- Died: 1974 (aged 73–74); Low Fell, Gateshead, England
- Occupations: Engineer; Writer; Shop steward
- Movement: Anarchism; Trade union; Anti-fascism
- Spouse: Lilian Brown
- Children: 2

Tom Brown (1900–1974) was a British anarcho-syndicalist trade unionist, anti-fascist, engineer and writer. Brown contributed articles to papers including War Commentary, Freedom, and Direct Action alongside authoring numerous pamphlets. Brown was known for his compelling public speaking and ability to communicate effectively in everyday terms. He placed a strong emphasis on federated local groups rather than centralism, and on workplace-based revolutionary trade unionism.

== Biography ==
Brown was born to a working-class family of shipbuilders in Newcastle upon Tyne, growing up close to the Tyneside shipyards. As a boy he took part in the school strikes of 1911. In 1916 he began an apprenticeship in marine engineering at the Armstrong-Whitworth works in Gateshead and became a trade union organiser and shop steward.

Brown joined the Socialist Labour Party before switching to the Communist Party, becoming the party's industrial organizer for North-East England, but he soon grew disillusioned and left the party.

Brown moved to Coventry to work in the motor industry. When the May 1926 General Strike ended Brown lost his job and moved to Birtley. Later that month he took part in the national lock-out of miners. Brown returned to the West Midlands to work in the motor industry and it was around this time that he took an interest in anarchism and syndicalism while working as a militant shop steward.

In 1934 he helped found the Anti-Fascist League to oppose the British Union of Fascists and took part in confrontations with fascists in Gateshead in May 1934.

In the mid-1930s he moved to London with his wife, Lilian, and his two daughters and became involved in the Anarcho Syndicalist Union until it collapsed in 1944, at which point he joined the Anarchist Federation of Britain.

Brown was inspired by the Spanish Revolution of 1936 and became involved in the anarchist newspaper Spain and the World, published by Freedom Press. Brown was involved in the CNT-FAI Spanish Aid Committees and did regular public speaking in support of the Spanish anarchists. Brown was actively involved in Spain and the World's successor paper Revolt! After Revolt! he took an active role in producing the anti-militarist newspaper War Commentary alongside Vernon Richards, Marie Louise Berneri and Albert Meltzer. At this time he wrote his first two pamphlets, Trade Unionism or Syndicalism (1942) and The British General Strike (1943).

In 1945 he helped establish the paper Direct Action following an acrimonious split within Freedom Press. In 1946 the Anarchist Federation became the Syndicalist Workers' Federation (SWF, now called the Solidarity Federation).

Brown assisted residents in Paddington to protest against the opening of a Mafia brothel, but one evening was attacked with iron bars leaving him unable to walk. He and Lily retired to Low Fell, Gateshead where he remained involved in the SWF and became active in the North East Labour History Society. Brown died at home in Low Fell in 1974.

== Pamphlets ==
- Trade Unionism or Syndicalism (1942)
- The British General Strike (1943)
- The Social General Strike: Why 1926 Failed (1946)
- What's Wrong With The Unions? (1955)
- Nationalisation and the New Boss Class (1958)
- Lenin and Workers' Control (1960s)
- School for Syndicalism (1964)
- Fighting for the Nine Hour Day (1962)

== Bibliography ==
- Brown, Tom (1990). Tom Brown's Syndicalism. London: Phoenix Press.
- Brown, Tom (1994). British syndicalism: Pages of Labour History. London: The Kate Sharpley Library.
