= Simon Watson Taylor (anarchist) =

English anarchist, translator and editor (1923–2005)

Simon Watson-Taylor
- Born: 15 April 1923; Wallingford, England
- Died: 4 November 2005 (aged 82); London, England
- Occupation: Author

Simon Watson Taylor (15 May 1923 – 4 November 2005) was an English intellectual who was born in Wallingford, in the historic county of Berkshire. He was briefly a poet and an author. But he was mostly a professional translator of French literature who also undertook editing. He initially subscribed to communism and then to surrealism. He subsequently subscribed to anarchism, upon which he rejected communism, after which he adopted pataphysics. However, upon becoming bored with pataphysicists, he rejected pataphysics and became a hippie.

== Early life ==
Watson Taylor was born on 15 May 1923 to Felix John Watson Taylor and Lillian Elizabeth Tennant, after his two sisters, in Wallingford, in the historic county of Berkshire. His father was a member of an extremely wealthy family which had made its fortune in the sugar trade in the West Indies.

Watson Taylor had an unsettled upbringing because of his father's fraught relationship with the law. By the late 1930s the family had left Wallingford and lived in several short-stay addresses in South East England, including Sussex. Watson Taylor's education reflected the changing domiciles of his family. According to one account he was educated in England, France, Switzerland, Germany and Austria. In contrast, according to a biography of him dated 29 August 1945 which was written by the Special Branch, he was educated in Switzerland. By his own admission, during the mid-1930s he attended a college that was deemed 'progressive' and which had received a charter that had been granted by Elizabeth I. He recalled that, while he was in its upper sixth form, he enjoyed 'annoying the teachers and his fellow students ... by sporting the lapel-pin of the YCL (Young Communist League) on [his] blazer.' Watson Taylor also recalled that, while the college had 'attendant horrors', it also had three redeeming characteristics: its drama society, in which he claimed as having 'shone', its art class, and the arts section of its library, which included a copy of the 1936 anthology Surrealism, which was edited by Herbert Read and which Watson Taylor described as having found exhilarating.

In 1940, Watson Taylor's family moved into a house at the top of Highgate Hill in London, which he described as having 'a panoramic view over the city'. In the following year he left home and moved to the fashionable Borough of Chelsea, where initially he roomed in various bohemian lodgings. Subsequently Watson Taylor acquired a flat in Markham Square, off the King's Road, where he became a member of the bohemian Chelsea set. He first became an actor with various companies, starting with the Regent's Park Open Air Theatre, followed by the Birmingham Repertory Theatre and other companies. However, he described his career as an actor as 'fairly brief', which he attributed to his lack of single-minded devotion to theatre and his probable lack of sufficient talent. He then worked in a factory. And eventually he worked as a flight attendant for BOAC, which enabled him to travel internationally. On one occasion, having travelled to New York, he met the two beat poets Allen Ginsberg and Gregory Corso, who subsequently stayed in his flat.

== Surrealism and anarchism ==
While Watson Taylor was living in Chelsea, he discovered Anton Zwemmer's bookshop in Charing Cross Road, which stocked the London Bulletin, an art magazine which was edited by E.L.T. Mesens the London-based Belgian art dealer and surrealist poet. Consequently, he met the members of the London Surrealist Group who, during the war, held meetings, initially each Wednesday evening, in the private upper room of the Barcelona Restaurant in 17 Beak Street, Soho.

Shortly afterwards, by January 1941, Watson Taylor had become a member of his local branch of the Young Communist League. Consequently, he attended the rally in Trafalgar Square that had been called by the People's Convention, which he castigated as a ‘Stalinist Front’. While he was attending the rally, he encountered Marie Louise Berneri who was selling copies of War Commentary, of which she was one of the founders and one of its editors. Having fallen in love with Berneri, Watson Taylor resolved to meet her the following day. Berneri was married to Vernon Richards, who owned Express Printers in Whitechapel, and was a close friend of fellow anarchists Philip Sansom and George Woodcock. Consequently, by meeting her, Watson Taylor became close friends with all of them. He also became, precise date unknown, a close friend of John Olday, the anarchist revolutionary and cartoonist of War Commentary, to whom he later wrote while Olday was imprisoned. Through his new friends, Watson Taylor became aware of Express Printers in 84a Whitechapel High Street, in the East End of London, which he described as being owned by Richards, and which printed not only the journal but also books and pamphlets. He concluded: 'Amid these libertarian surroundings my communist pretensions vanished without trace.'

In 1945, Watson Taylor became the secretary of the London Surrealist Group. In the following year, George Melly, the English jazz and blues singer, having become converted to surrealism, sought out the Group. When he did so, he was invited to visit Watson Taylor in his flat. Melly recalled:

'He was small but neatly made, full of aggressive energy fuelled by alcohol, controlled by discipline. He was dressed in a well-cut conservative tweed suit with an expensive shirt and tie. His eyes blazed with intelligence. His hair was short, cut en brosse by an excellent barber. His humour was icy. I found him impressive and rather intimidating.'

Watson Taylor and Melly were to become life-long friends.

== Free Unions/Union Libres ==
In 1944, an uncle left Watson Taylor an inheritance of £2,000 (equivalent to £76,681 in 2025), which prompted him to decide to produce a surrealist review. His planned title for it was Free Unions/Union Libres, in homage to the love poem libre Union libre by André Breton, the French writer and poet, and co-founder of surrealism. Watson Taylor hoped that he would be able to obtain help from Express Printers. Its help could be invaluable because it could obtain the high-quality paper that he wanted which otherwise would have been extremely difficult for him to procure. And of course it could print the review.

By the end of 1944, Watson Taylor had collated all the contents that he needed for the review, including prose text, poems and illustrations. All that remained was to receive the design for the cover that Birmingham-based surrealist painter Conroy Maddox had promised. (Note: The cover, which Remy described as an écrémage (see the entry for Écrémage, in Surrealist techniques), is reproduced in Remy 2018, p. 142, and on an unpaginated preliminary page in Morris 2022.) However, then two unexpected related events occurred. First, early one Sunday morning, policemen from the Special Branch of Scotland Yard raided Watson Taylor's flat. Watson Taylor recounted that they were not interested in him but in John Olday, who had written a Freedom Press Forces Letter which was sent to the subscribers of the anarchist journal War Commentary. The policemen didn't find Olday in the flat. Instead they found a mass of typescripts, photographs and artwork that Watson Taylor had been assembling for Free Unions/Union Libres that was on his desk which they took away for further inspection as 'potentially subversive anarchist propaganda' and which were later declared to be 'coded messages and as such not to be released'. Second, at the end of the year, the editors of War Commentary: Richards, Berneri, Sansom and John Hewetson, were arrested by police officers from the Special Branch on a charge of ‘incitement to disaffection’, ostensibly for distributing ant-war leaflets to soldiers at Waterloo Station who were about to entrain for embarkation to the Middle East. Watson Taylor stood bail for Sansom. All the editors apart from Berneri were jailed for nine months, despite the valiant attempts that Watson Taylor made in his capacity as the treasurer of the Freedom Press Defence Committee.

In July 1946, a policeman returned to Watson Taylor his typescripts, photographs and artwork. Richards and Sansom had been released. And Watson Taylor had edited Free Unions/Unions Libres. Consequently, the review was finally printed with the technical assistance of Sansom and Berneri. It was a 48-page bilingual publication which comprised forty-eight contributions from various authors. Marcel Jean, the French surrealist, described it as follows:

‘Various texts, by J.B. Brunius, Benjamin Péret, Watson Taylor, and Conroy Maddox, together with critical notes, quotations, and translations, reaffirmed the surrealist position against wars, moral systems and religions. Jarry was given pride of place … with some scenes from Ubu Roi, and Sade was represented by a translation of the political harangue “Français, encore un effort si vous voulez être républicains” which forms part of that author’s book La Philosophie dans le Boudoir. The volume also included a number of poems, and reproductions of collages, drawings, and paintings by members of the English surrealist group.’(Italics in the original)

Michael Remy (2019) observed: 'the review can be seen as a manifesto, produced in a communal spirit, and gathering anarchists (most of Taylor's friends, such as F.J. Brown and Philip Sansom) together with Trotskyists (Benjamin Péret, for example), so that it should constitute a conduit for surrealist tenets.' However, the review turned out to be its sole issue. Remy commented that it 'strikes a strangely unachieved, unfinished note.'

Watson Taylor sent a copy of Free Unions/Unions Libres to Breton, in Paris. Breton was delighted with it. Consequently, Watson Taylor went to Paris to meet him, his friends and the members of the French surrealist group. However, a power struggle arose in Paris between two factions of the movement there, from which Watson Taylor disassociated himself. Shortly afterwards in 1947, The International Surrealist Exhibition was held in Paris, which was the last occasion for an appearance of the English group of surrealists. The appearance of the group comprised its contribution to a published work on surrealism which was entitled Déclaration du groupe surrréaliste en Angleterre. The Declaration was written by E.L.T. Mesens and Roland Penrose, and was signed by, among others, Sansom and Watson Taylor. American academic Paul C. Ray (1971) observed that the declaration was 'a tacit admission of the failure of the English surrealists to maintain any kind of productive cohesiveness', which he attributed to 'the individualism, the eccentricity even, of the English ... one of the reasons given eleven years later for the failure of the movement in England.' Ray also observed that the declaration concludes 'with a re-affirmation of devotion to surrealist principles as stated by Breton in his interview in View, his prolegomena to a third manifesto, his "Position of Surrealism between the Wars", and in Benjamin Péret's Le Déshonneur des poètes.'

== Pataphysics ==
After Watson Taylor severed his ties with surrealism, he subscribed to the tongue-in-cheek science of Pataphysics, and in 1954 became a member of the recently created Collège de Pataphysique, which does not appear to have had a campus. Art historian Michael Taylor documented that by the end of the 1950s its members included Watson Taylor and the leading American literary scholar Roger Shattuck, who later collaborated with each other as editors.

Watson Taylor distinguished himself in the Collège de Pataphysique by achieving the hypothetical status of Provéditeur-Délégataire, Régent de Brittanicité Faustrolliene et de Travaux Pratiques de Alcoölisme. However, he became disillusioned with it. And in 1968 he publicly signed off from it with an article entitled 'Alfred Jarry: the magnificent pataphysical posture' in The Times Literary Supplement, which in turn prompted the Collège to pronounce him 'dead by resignation'. Initially and in contrast, Watson Taylor remained on excellent terms with the London Institute of Pataphysics and declared himself 'delighted by its occasional investigations of what passes for "reality".' However, in 1968 he became bored with the 'solemn black humour' of the pataphysicists.

Shortly afterwards in 1972, Anarchist Stuart Christie recounted his personal experience of Watson Taylor while he was serving his eighteen-months imprisonment in Brixton Prison. Christie was one of the eight defendants, the Stoke Newington 8, in the criminal trial of The Angry Brigade which lasted from May to December, in which he was eventually acquitted. He recalled that Watson Taylor regularly visited him in prison with expensive food parcels, at least one of which was a hamper from the famous London Fortnum & Mason department store. He described Watson Taylor as 'having the elegance and bearing of a Regency dandy' and observed that he 'carried a silver-topped walking cane on which his name was engraved.' Christie concluded his recollection of Watson Taylor with the following account of his benevolence. At the time of the trial of the Stoke Newington 8, Watson Taylor was in India. Nevertheless, he gave Melly, who had been looking after his collection of surrealist paintings in his flat, permission to sell one of them to raise money for the Stoke Newington 8 Defence Committee. The sale of the painting raised about £10,000 for the committee.

== Literary accomplishments ==
=== Translating ===
Watson Taylor's literary activities appear to have begun in 1944 when he had three poems published. However, his literary accomplishments began in earnest in 1960 and comprised translations of at least twenty French books and plays, most of which were published in London. Most of the books were about art and were published by the London firm of Weidenfeld & Nicolson. After 1966, his translations of books and plays were published in London by other publishers and in the United States, mostly in New York. He translated the book Paris Peasant (1971) by Louis Aragon the French surrealist poet, and the book Surrealism and Painting (1972), by Breton. The plays which he translated included The Cenci (1969), by Antonin Artaud, and The Generals' Tea Party (1967), The Knackers' ABC (1968) and The Empire Builders (1971) by Boris Vian, and, with Cyril Connolly, The Ubu Plays (1968) by Alfred Jarry. Melly, who Watson Taylor once accommodated, recalled: 'I can see him still in the flat at his work table, surrounded by reference books and dictionaries, and the results were impeccably researched and elegantly worded.'

=== Editing ===
Between 1960 and the early 1970s Watson Taylor was an editor and a prolific translator of French literary works. In 1960, he was the guest co-editor with leading American literary scholar Roger Shattuck of a special issue (Volume 4, No. 13. May–June) of the American literary magazine Evergreen Review; titled What is Pataphysics?. In 1965, he co-edited with Roger Shattuck Selected Works of Alfred Jarry. In 1968, he edited French Writing Today which was published by Penguin. He was an editorial advisor and frequent contributor to the London-based magazine Art and Artists. And in 1971, he co-edited with Jamaican-born poet Edward Lucie-Smith a bilingual anthology, French poetry today.

== Later life ==
Watson Taylor dismissed jazz, sold his 78s for £50, and discarded his suits for hippie clothing. He then emigrated to Goa, where he enjoyed a hedonistic lifestyle. He subsequently moved to one of the many islands of the Philippines, from which he eventually returned to England, because of ill-health. He arrived in London 'with no money and possessing only what he had on.' However, Janet Menzel, whom he had met in Goa, took him under her wing. She found him a comfortable bedsit off the Fulham Road and looked after him until the day he died, 4 November 2005. He died in London.

== Publications ==
1940s

- —— (1944). "Afterthoughts".
- —— (1944). "Last reflection". In Fergar, Feyyaz; Cherkeshi, Sadi (eds.). Dint: Anthology of Modern Poetry (August ed.).
- —— (1944). "Reflection".
- —— (1944). "The sailor's return". In Mesens (ed.). Message from nowhere/Message de nulle part. London: London Gallery Editions.
- —— (1945). "Vote with your feet!" (PDF). War Commentary. 6 (17): 3.
- —— (1946). "A shroud for your eyes madam: a funeral oration".
- —— (1947). "Déclaration du Groupe Surréaliste Angleterre". Le Surréalisme en 1947 (Spring ed.). p. 45-47.
- —— (1946). "Fragments from My real life in exact proportion to those who cannot read…."
- —— (1946). "Frenchmen! One more effort if you want to be Republicans" translated by Watson Taylor from a chapter in Sade 1994, originally 1795.
- —— (1947). "Here's another fine mess!" A dissertation on Laurel and Hardy – the ambassadors of the dispossessed". Film Survey. 1 (4): 21-23.

1960s

- —— (1960). "The College of 'Pataphysics: An apodeictic outline". Evergreen Review. 4 (13): 150-157.
- —— (1965). "Taro Okamoto". Studio International. 170 (871): 192-197.
- —— (1968a). "Alfred Jarry The magnificent pataphysical posture". Times Literary Supplement. 3 October: 1132-1133.
- —— (1968). "Apollinaire 1880-1918". The London Magazine. 8 (8).
- —— (1968). "Naissance de l'art cinétique, by Frank Popper, and: Kinetic Art by Guy Brett, and: Optical and Kinetic Art by Michael Compton (review)". Leonardo. 1 (3): 330-331.
- —— (1969). "André Breton & René Magritte". Studio International. 177 (908): 68-70.

== Archive ==
- Simon Watson Taylor 'Pataphysical' & Surrealist collection, 1935-1965, University of Tulsa, retrieved 8 March 2026.
