= George Cores =

British anarchist and trade unionist

- Born: 20 September 1867; Bethnal Green, London, England
- Died: 20 September 1949 (aged 82); Willesden, London, England
- Occupation: Shoemaker
- Movement: Anarchism; Trade unionism

George Cores (20 September 1867 – 20 September 1949) was an anarchist and militant trade unionist.

== Biography ==
Raised in dire poverty in London's East End, George's illiterate Hanover-born father, John Henry Christopher Kors laboured under fearful conditions in a local sugar refinery until he died, aged just 38, of "lung and heart disease", before George's first birthday. Cores was close to Freedom, but held long protracted disputes with some of the other members particularly Thomas Keell.

By a young age he had already succumbed to radicalism and is given as the secretary of the Hackney Branch of the Socialist League by around 1887. He would maintain links with the Socialist League, particularly helping with its publication Commonweal (which ran until about 1894) but by 1890 he had taken up a position in Leicester as a laster working in the boot and shoe trade. In his all too brief stay in Leicester he was responsible for unofficial strikes in the boot and shoe trade, organising Leicester's first May Day demonstration in 1893 and becoming a delegate for the National Union of Boot and Shoe Operatives (NUBSO).

George Cores is remembered for a running feud he held with Thomas Keell, on his directorship of Freedom and later his own publication, the Freedom Bulletin. Arguments between the two manifested as early as 1915, but would continue well into 1930s when the Freedom group was becoming moribund and Keell reduced the scope of the paper and decided to move its publication away outside London to Whiteway Colony near Stroud in Gloucestershire.

The dispute between Keell and Cores was divisive and while Cores had nominal backing from the likes of Meltzer and John Turner, the matter would not be clearly resolved until the various short runs and split publications ran their course and Vernon Richards reinvigorated the Freedom group with his merger from Spain and the World.

== Publications ==
- Personal Recollections of the Anarchist Past, (1993) KSL (Pamphlet)
