= War Commentary =

British anarchist newspaper (1939–1945)

- The cover from the 5th May 1945
- Type: Fortnightly
- Publisher: Freedom Press
- Editorial group: Marie Louise Berneri; Vernon Richards; John Hewetson; Philip Sansom; George Woodcock
- Founded: November 1939
- Ceased publication: August 1945 (relaunched as Freedom)
- Political alignment: Anarchist; Anti-militarist; Anti-war
- Headquarters: Newbury Street, London

War Commentary was an England-based anti-militarist anti-war anarchist serial publication that was published from 1939 to 1945, initially as a journal and then as a newspaper, as part of the movement which was opposed to World War II (see Opposition to World War II), along anti-capitalist and anti-state lines.

== The launch of War Commentary ==
War Commentary was launched in November 1939 by Vernon Richards after the closure of the journal Spain and the World to continue the tradition of Freedom, and was published by Freedom Press Distributors from its temporary address of Whiteway Colony, nr. Stroud, Glos England, where Lilian Wolfe was still living after the death of her partner Thomas Keell. The issue was produced on a duplicator and was sold out in the first fortnight after it was published, for which credit was accorded to anarchist comrades in Glasgow, who sold 500 copies. (Note: Goodway (1963) described Glasgow as 'the only British city ever to have had a significant anarchist movement (in contrast to London's Continental exiles and Jewish immigrants)' (Ward & Goodway 2014, p. 4). See Jenny Patrick, Guy Aldred and Frank Leech.)

The second issue of War Commentary was printed by the Narod Press in Whitechapel, in East London, which was run by Israel Narodiczky, and was published from its mailing address of '9 Newbury Street, Clerkenwell' in Central London. The relationship between Freedom Press Distributors and the Narod Press wasn't a happy one. Consequently, Freedom Press Publishers changed its printers to a printing press off the Harrow Road in West London which was run by Hugh and Ashley Brock, two pacifist brothers.

Until 1941 the journal appeared monthly, when six supplements were produced. From its mid-January (Vol. 3 No. 4) 1942 issue, it appeared twice a month. From its June 1942 (Vol. 13 No. 3) issue, it was printed from The Express Printers, in 84a High Street, Whitechapel, E.1. (Note: See the entry for 84a Whitechapel High Street in Whitechapel High Street.) Express Printers was owned by Judah Shenfield, whose brother ran the London office of V.W.H. Ltd, a firm of printers. See Spain and the World for a detailed account. Shenfield signed up for the army and tragically was killed in action. The premises, which had become neglected, became even more rundown. The landlord was left with the printing equipment, which he wanted to sell. The by-now editorial team of War Commentary bought the equipment for £500 and then proceeded to publish the journal from the address. In November 1944, on the occasion of its 100th issue, War Commentary changed its format from a journal to a four-page newspaper.

Regular contributors to War Commentary included Vernon Richards and his wife Marie Louise Berneri, John Hewetson, Philip Sansom, and Ethel Mannin (Note: Mannin had contributed her article 'To the women of England' to the first issue of War Commentary (Mannin 1939).), with John Olday contributing cartoons. Occasional contributors included Tom Brown, Reginald Reynolds, George Woodcock and Colin Ward.

== The arrests of the editors ==
By late 1944 the British state was extremely aware of War Commentary because for some time the Special Branch and MI5 had been spying on those who were involved in it. However, the state had not taken action against anyone. Then the situation dramatically changed as a result of four actions which the editors undertook. Initially, in late October they sent to the subscribers of the journal the latest issue of the Freedom Press Forces Letter which John Olday had been writing and producing. Then, in November the editors published a series of three articles under the heading ‘All power to the soviets’ by Michael Peterson. (Note: Heath n.d. identified that 'Michael Peterson' was one of several names by which John Olday was known.) 'All power to the Soviets', 'All power to the Soviets China' and 'All power to the Soviets (3-4)'.

The state responded by arresting the four editors of War Commentary: Berneri, Hewetson, Richards and Sansom, and charging them with conspiring to cause disaffection among members of the armed forces under Defence Regulation 39a. Also, Inspector Whitehead of Scotland Yard, accompanied by four officers, raided the offices of Freedom Press in Belsize Road, London Borough of Camden and searched them and the three people who were working there with recourse to Defence Regulation 88A. Very soon after the raid, Berneri and Richards asked Woodcock to meet them at Camden Town Tube Station. When they met, they told him that the police 'had shown a special interest in the typewriter on which the appeal to the soldiers had been prepared.' The reason they told him this information was that he had typed the stencils for the manifesto on his typewriter and that if he was caught there would be nobody else left to run War Commentary. At the end of the meeting, Berneri asked Woodcock directly if he would take over the running of the newspaper, to which he agreed.

For Woodcock to run War Commentary he needed to regularize his situation by registering his change of address. After he had done so he immediately contacted Herbert Read for support. And, within a few days they persuaded T. S. Eliot, E. M. Forster, Stephen Spender, George Orwell, Dylan Thomas and several other well-known writers to sign letters in protest about the raid on Freedom Press. Their letters were published in the New Statesman and Tribune, and were followed shortly afterwards by the arrests of the four editors, who were charged and released on bail.

== The trial ==
The subsequent four-day trial of the editors at the Old Bailey received significant coverage from the press. Woodcock later observed:

All the so-called seditious writings - prose and poetry - on which the prosecution based its case were read in court, and the daily papers reported them almost verbatim, so that ideas that had previously reached only a few thousand people through War Commentary now reached several millions, courtesy Lord Beaverbrook and Lord Rothermere.

The Freedom Press Defence Committee was launched, which included notable figures such as George Orwell, Simon Watson Taylor, Herbert Read, Harold Laski, Kingsley Martin, Benjamin Britten, Augustus John, and Bertrand Russell. (Note: Woodcock 1982, p. 267 documented: 'We got no help at all from the Civil Liberties Association [sic], which had been infiltrated by the Stalinists who in 1945 were still fervently patriotic'.) The trial concluded with Richards, Sansom and Hewetson being sentenced to nine months imprisonment; the charges against Berneri were dropped as legally a wife could not be prosecuted for conspiring with her husband, about which she was reportedly furious. (Note: Berneri's fury may be understood from the observation of Ward (in Ward & Goodway 2014, p. 35) that in English law 'husband and wife are legally one person'.)

== The aftermath ==
In May 1945, Woodcock and Berneri chose Freedom as a replacement name for the paper. Consequently, in its 11 August (Volume 6. No. 21) issue, the masthead included the announcement that the title of the next issue would be FREEDOM through Anarchism (emboldening in the original). Subsequently the title was shortened to Freedom. (Note: Woodcock (1982) disclosed: 'I have not, in all the forty years since then, written better journalism than I did then for that obscure paper with its four or five thousand readers.' (Woodcock 1982, p. 269).) Also, the Freedom Press Defence Committee was renamed as the Freedom Defence Committee to expand its scope. (Note: Goodway 2012, p. 143 observed that the committee continued to operate until its dissolution in 1949.) These events were followed by the eventual release of the defendants after serving their sentences. Two of them, Richards and Hewetson, lost their jobs and returned to their previous tasks of editing and running Express Printers in 84a Whitechapel High Street.

== See also ==
- Freedom Press Defence Committee

== Archives ==
- Bishopsgate Institute Freedom Press Library
- Freedom Defence Committee
- Freedom Defence Committee, Jul 1945 - July 1946
- Freedom Press Newspaper Archive
- Kate Sharpley Library
- War Commentary (1939-1945)
- "War Commentary: Background". International Institute of Social History. Archived from the original on 9 December 2021.
