= Freedom Press Defence Committee =

UK organization

See also War Commentary.

The Freedom Press Defence Committee was formed in London following the arrests on 22 February 1945 of the editors of War Commentary, an anarchist anti-war publication produced by London publisher Freedom Press. Four people were arrested: Marie Louise Berneri, Vernon Richards (the husband of Berneri), John Hewetson and Philip Sansom. They were detained under Regulation 39a of the Defence (General) Regulations 1939 for conspiring "to undermine the affections of members of His Majesty's Forces". (Note: Under Regulation 39a, it was an offence to encourage serving members of the military to stop performing their duties, or to cause dissatisfaction with their duties.)

On 12 December 1944, officers of the Special Branch, led by Inspector Whitehead, raided the homes of the editors of War Commentary and its sympathisers, and searched the belongings of soldiers who were stationed in various part of Britain. (Note: Ward in Ward & Goodway 2014, pp. 32–33.) One of the soldiers was anarchist Colin Ward, who was stationed in Stromness, on Orkney. Around the same time, the offices of Freedom Press were also raided. In the January, Sansum was charged with ‘being in possession of an army waterproof coat and for failing to notify a change of address’, for which he was sentenced to two months' imprisonment in Brixton Prison. Then in February Berneri, Richards and Hewetson were arrested in their homes and taken to Marylebone Police Court, where they were joined by Sansom. (Note: Four London Anarchists Arrested.)

Shortly after the raid on the Freedom Press offices, Bernari and Richards met fellow anarchist George Woodcock, who was loosely affiliated with War Commentary, to tell him about the raid and to convey their expectation that they and the two other editors would be arrested and tried under Defence Regulation 39a, as a result of which there would be no-one left to run it. Consequently, Bernari asked Woodcock if he would run the newspaper in their absence. Woodcock immediately agreed to do so and, after having regularised his situation by registering his change of address, he immediately contacted Herbert Read for support. Within a few days they persuaded T. S. Eliot, E. M. Forster, Stephen Spender, George Orwell, Dylan Thomas and several other well-known writers to sign letters to protest about the raid on Freedom Press. Their letters were published in the New Statesman and Tribune, and were followed by the arrests of the four editors, who were charged and released on bail.

== The creation of the Committee ==
The previous events afforded Woodcock and Read the basis that they needed to create a defence committee. Accordingly an announcement appeared in the 10 March issue of War Commentary that a meeting had been held on the 3rd at which a decision was made to 'set up immediately a defence committee with three main objectives: '1. To defend the four anarchists arrested and charged under Defence Regulation 39A. 2. To protest against any attacks upon the freedom of speech and publication. 3. To organize a Defence Fund to cover the legal expenses of the accused and the Committee's own expenses.' (Note: Freedom Press Defence Committee.) (Note: At the time, the name of the committee was occasionally abbreviated to the Freedom Defence Committee, see for example Orwell 1968, pp. 377, 447. However, it only became the Freedom Defence Committee after it later reconstituted itself.)

The committee was formed independently of the National Council for Civil Liberties which at the time was regarded as being a Communist front or 'Communist-dominated and only inclined to aid the politically correct’. Simon Watson Taylor, a Surrealist, organized it. (Note: Ward in Ward & Goodway 2014, p. 36.)

The announcement in War Commentary subsequently stated: 'Herbert Read agreed to become Chairman of the Committee' and Ethel Mannin, who was not able to be present, has since agreed to be Secretary. Vice-Chairmen include Fenner Brockway and Patrick Figgis. The treasurer is S. Watson Taylor.' (Note: Four London Anarchists Arrested.) The announcement went on to report that premises for the committee had been secured at 17 St George Square, Hanover Square, London W.1. Also it made two appeals, for volunteers to assist during the day at the office and for contributions towards the Defence Fund. (Note: Freedom Press Defence Committee.)

The committee duly raised funds for the defence of the editors, which were collected by Simon Watson Taylor in his capacity as its treasurer.

== The Trial ==
The trial of the editors took place at the Old Bailey, the Central Criminal Court, on 27 April 1945. Marie Louise Berneri was acquitted on the legal technicality that a wife could not be guilty of conspiracy with her husband, about which she was reportedly furious. (Note: Berneri's fury may be understood from the observation of Ward (in Ward & Goodway 2014, p. 35) that in English law 'husband and wife are legally one person'.) The other three defendants were convicted and sentenced to 9 months' imprisonment. (Note: Peace News, 4 May 1945.) Herbert Read made a speech before the trial, which he followed with one after it, which the Committee published in the following June. (Note: Read's speeches were published as a 14-page pamphlet which had a foreword by 'E. Silverman', see Read 1945.)

== The creation of Freedom Defence Committee ==
On 3 March 1945 (Note: Peace News, 9 March 1945.) after the defendants had served their imprisonments, the Freedom Press Defence Committee reconstituted itself as the Freedom Defence Committee, which was set up "to uphold the essential liberty of individuals and organisations, and to defend those who are persecuted for exercising their rights to freedom of speech, writing and action". Herbert Read served as the chair. Fenner Brockway and Patrick Figgis (a well-known church socialist) initially served as its vice-chairs. Other vice-chairs later included Richard Acland and George Orwell. Ethel Mannin initially served as its secretary, from whom George Woodcock later took over.

The Committee had sponsors. Initially they comprised A. E. Housman, Ethel Mannin, S. Vere Pearson (Note: A Remembrance of Sydney Vere Pearson.) and Reginald Reynolds, who had previously been members of the defunct Solidaridad Internacional Antifascista (International Antifascist Solidarity). They were later joined by many well-known 'writers, artists and musicians', and politicians Aneurin Bevan and Michael Foot.

On 18 September 1948, the committee had published in the Socialist Leader its letter requesting urgent funds which was signed by Benjamin Britten, E. M. Forster, Augustus John, Orwell, Read and Osbert Sitwell. (Note: The letter is reprinted in Orwell 1968, pp. 446–447.) The situation which prompted the letter was that the accounts of the committee showed 'a deficit of over £145', and that it immediately needed 'at least £500' and thereafter 'a regular income of at least £1,000' if it was 'to carry on efficiently.'

The Committee was dissolved in 1949.

== Archives ==
- Freedom Defence Committee
- Freedom Defence Committee, Jul 1945 - July 1946
- Freedom Defence Committee brochure page 1
- Freedom Defence Committee brochure page 2
- The Freedom Press Newspaper Archive
