= Jack Robinson (anarchist) =

- Born: 1913; Birmingham, England
- Died: 20 March 1983 (aged 69–70)
- Occupations: Nurse; Newspaper editor
- Movement: Anarchist
- Partner: Mary Canipa

Jack Robinson (1913 – 20 March 1983) was an English anarchist, activist, and editor of the paper Freedom.

== Biography ==
Robinson was born in 1913 in Birmingham. (Note: Rob Ray (2018) states that Robinson was born in 1921.)

A conscientious objector and nurse by training, he worked in an epileptic colony during World War II. He earned part of his living as a book trader, working alongside Lilian Wolfe and Mary Canipa in the Freedom Bookshop. Robinson contributed articles to Freedom and Anarchy, sometimes anonymously, likely during the 1960s and certainly into the 1970s. He also contributed under the name Jon Quixote.

His discovery that Albert Meltzer’s Wooden Shoe Press was being evicted for unpaid rent was the premise of the long dispute between Meltzer and Vernon Richards.

Robinson was active for stints in the Colne and Nelson Anarchist Groups alongside Donald Rooum. He was a non-smoker, a teetotaler and a vegetarian. Robinson died 20 March 1983, following a stroke two months earlier.

== Publications ==
- Rooum, D (Ed.) "Freedom": A Hundred Years, October 1886-October 1986 London, Freedom Press, 1986 ISBN 0-900384-35-2
- Rooum, D (Ed.) What Is Anarchism?: An Introduction, London, Freedom Press, ISBN 0-900384-66-2
