= Housing: An Anarchist Approach =

1976 book

- Author: Colin Ward
- Language: English
- Genre: Political philosophy, architecture
- Publisher: Freedom Press
- Publication date: 1976
- Publication place: England
- Pages: 182

Housing: An anarchist approach is a book written by Colin Ward which was originally published in 1976 by Freedom Press in London.

== Content ==
Housing: An Anarchist Approach is a collection of essays and speeches which Colin Ward collated over the course of 20 years which examine housing issues in the United Kingdom, including the role of planners and architects and public housing. (Note: Jacobs 2025 documented that Freedom Press republished Housing: An anarchist approach (Ward 1976) with a postscript in 1983 (Ward 1983).) Ward primarily criticised the Government of the United Kingdom, leaving criticism of capitalism as secondary. At the time, landlords owned 10% of properties in the UK, which was passing through slum clearances and municipalization programmes that the Labour Party created. Ward specially criticised the left approach to housing, but also the private landlord model, defending an anarchist approach. Ward predicted that renting would mostly disappear. However, his prediction failed because the Right to Buy policy from the Margaret Thatcher government was yet to take effect, and up to 2016 40% of the UK public houses would be bought by landlords.

Ward defended squatting and housing cooperative movements on Third World countries, especially in Latin America, Africa and Asia, as better solutions to house the poor compared to council housing in the UK. As examples, he cited the popular housing movements during Salvador Allende government in Chile and the work of John Turner in Peru. Ward cited as an alternative for the UK the initiative of the Urban Homesteading Assistance Board (UHAB) in New York City, where abandoned buildings were renovated by the prospective tenants at a low cost and rented for half the price. Also Ward elaborated on anarchist architecture, citing self-build, DIY culture, informal economy and Local Exchange Trading Systems (LETS) as essential for anarchism.
