= Freedom (British newspaper) =

London-based anarchist monthly newspaper

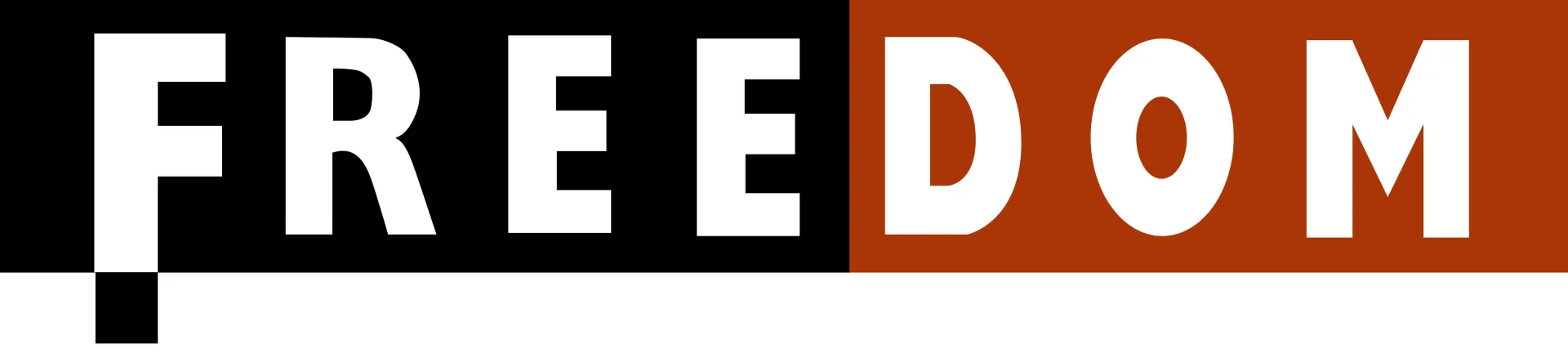
- Type: Semi-annual journal and online newswire
- Format: A4
- Owner: Freedom Press
- Publisher: Freedom Press
- Founded: 1886
- Political alignment: Anarchist
- Language: English
- Headquarters: 84b Whitechapel High Street, London
- Circulation: 1,000
- Sister newspapers: Freedom Bulletin; Spain and the World; Revolt! War Commentary
- ISSN: 0016-0504
- Website: freedomnews.org.uk

Freedom is a London-based anarchist news website and semi-annual journal published by Freedom Press. It was formerly either a monthly, a fortnightly or a weekly newspaper. It is the world's oldest surviving anarchist publication, currently edited by Uri Gordon.

The paper was started in 1886 by volunteers including Peter Kropotkin and Charlotte Wilson and continued with a short interruption in the 1930s until 2014 as a regular publication, moving its news production online and publishing irregularly until 2016, when it became a semi-annual. Originally, the subtitle was "A Journal of Anarchist Socialism". The title was changed to "A Journal of Anarchist Communism" in June 1889. Currently it's labelled simply as an "Anarchist Journal". The newspaper's mission statement was originally stated in every issue and summarises the writers' view of anarchism:

Anarchists work towards a society of mutual aid and voluntary co-operation. We reject all government and economic repression. This newspaper, published continuously since 1936, exists to explain anarchism more widely and show that only in an anarchist society can human freedom thrive.

The current printed issue does not carry a summary, but the website retains a section of the original 1886 introductory essay by Peter Kropotkin:

We are socialists, disbelievers in property, advocates of the equal claims of all to work for the community as seems good — calling no-one master, and of the equal claim to each to satisfy as seems good to them, their natural needs from the stock of social wealth they have laboured to produce ...We are anarchists, disbelievers in the government of the many by the few in any shape and under any pretext.

== History ==
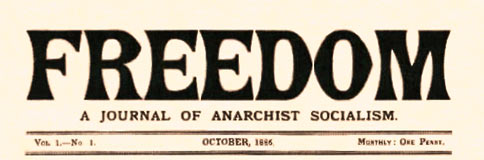
1886 front page

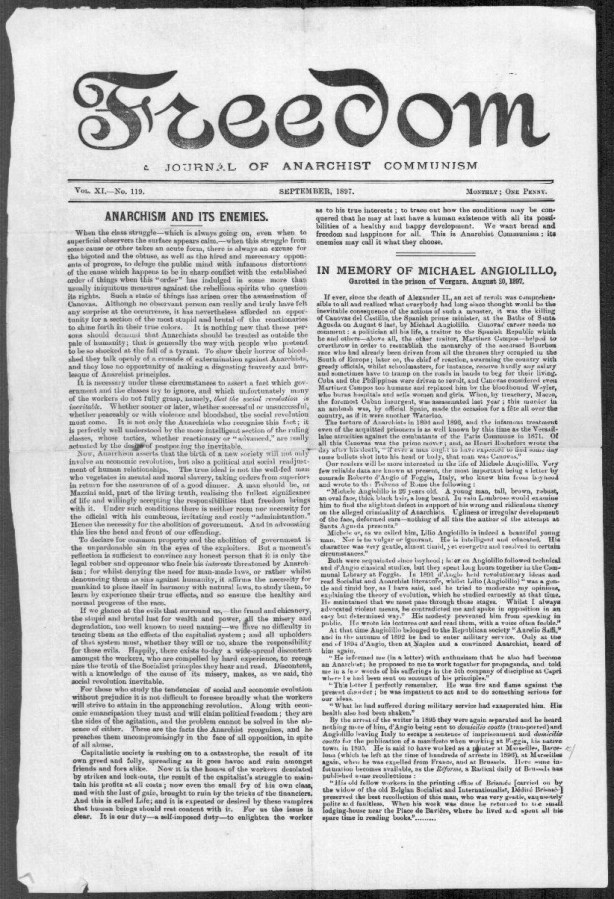
September 1897 front page

The paper historically featured news from the peace and labour movements and events as well as listing planned events and protests. Staying true to Kropotkin's principle of mutual aid, the paper regularly featured reviews of other anarchist and libertarian socialist publications, such as Organise! and Direct Action as well as other local and international newsletters and journals.

In 2006, the paper gained a colour front for the first time in its history. Along with a number of gradual changes in the content and structure of the paper and organisational changes at Freedom Press, Freedom received a re-design in January 2008. While remaining a fortnightly newspaper, it doubled the number of pages to 16 and reduced to A4 in size, introducing a basic theory section, dedicated business and public sector pages and an increased story count. In late 2011, it switched from fortnightly to monthly publication, which continued until its closure as a regular paper in 2014. It cost £2 per issue.

On 1 March 2014, Freedom announced the closure of its print edition as a monthly publication, continuing to publish online alongside a semi-annual printed freesheet. This was expanded into a 20-page journal from 2016.

== Editors ==
Note that this is a non-comprehensive list:

- 1886–1895: Charlotte Wilson
- 1895–1910: Alfred Marsh
- 1910–1928: Thomas Keell
- 1930–1934: John Turner
- 1945-1948 George Woodcock
- 1945–1949: Marie Louise Berneri
- 1945–1968: Vernon Richards
- 1940–1960: Colin Ward (joint)
- 1964–1969: John Rety
- 1970: Peter Turner, Jack Robinson and Bill Christopher
- 1970s: John Lawrence, Donald Rooum
- 1970s–1980s: Stu Stuart, Vernon Richards
- 1976–1980s: David Peers
- 1980s: Gillian Fleming
- 1990s–2001: Charles Crute
- 2001–2004: Toby Crow
- 2003–2004: Steven, Jim Clarke
- 2004–2009: Rob Ray
- 2009–2013: Dean Talent
- 2012–2013: Matt Black
- 2013–2014: Charlotte Dingle
- 2014–2016: Ella Harrison & Adam Barr
- 2016–2018: Rob Ray
- 2017–2022: Zosia Brom
- 2022-2023: Sylvia Mann
- 2024–present: Uri Gordon

== Related publications ==
Spain and the World was an anarchist publication founded in 1936 by Vernon Richards with former Freedom writers, which had effectively ceased publication in 1932. The intention was to provide an English-language publication to support Spanish anarchists who were at that time achieving a measure of political influence through the anarchist trade union Confederación Nacional del Trabajo (CNT) and other organisations. Spain and the World had several notable contributors, including Emma Goldman, Herbert Read, Ethel Mannin and John Cowper Powys.

Between the end of the Spanish Civil War and the outbreak of World War II, the fortnightly Spain and the World briefly became Revolt! in 1939 before adopting the title War Commentary. In 1945, War Commentary resumed the title of Freedom.

In 1944, Richards, his wife Marie-Louise Berneri and two others associated with the paper (Philip Sansom and John Hewetson) were charged with conspiring to cause disaffection among members of the armed forces. Despite a defence campaign backed by the likes of George Orwell, Michael Tippett, T. S. Eliot and Benjamin Britten, Vernon, Sansom and Hewetson were convicted and served nine months in jail.

Freedom Press compiled a selection of articles from Freedom in the 1991 book The State Is Your Enemy.

== Related pages ==
- List of anarchist periodicals
- The Raven: Anarchist Quarterly
