= Anarchy in Action =

1973 book by Colin Ward

- Front cover of Anarchy in Action by Colin Ward (1973 Allen & Unwin edition)
- Author: Colin Ward
- Language: English
- Subject: Anarchism
- Genre: Political Science
- Publisher: George Allen & Unwin and Freedom Press (UK), Harper & Row (US)
- Publication date: 1973
- Publication place: United Kingdom
- Pages: 157 pp (first edition)
- ISBN: 0043210163
- OCLC: 714957
- Dewey Decimal: 335.83
- LC Class: 73169626

Anarchy in Action by Colin Ward explores anarchist thought and practice. It was initially published in London by Allen & Unwin in 1973. It was subsequently published in America and, in translation, in Dutch, Italian, Spanish and Japanese. A second edition was published by Freedom Press in 2008. Ward explained in its Introduction that his book 'is simply an extended, updating footnote to Kropotkin's Mutual Aid.'

The book is a seminal introduction to anarchism but differs considerably from other introductions by concentrating on the possibility of an anarchism rooted in everyday experience that is not necessarily linked to industrial and political struggles.

Ward based his book on evidence from sociology, anthropology, cybernetics, industrial psychology, and from the experience of housing, town planning, education, work, play and social welfare. Ward argued for anarchist alternatives to the universal governmental and hierarchical systems of social organisation, including the welfare state.

== Quotation ==
"The argument of this book is that an anarchist society, a society which organizes itself without authority, is always in existence, like a seed beneath the snow, buried under the weight of the state and its bureaucracy, capitalism and its waste, privilege and its injustices, nationalism and its suicidal loyalties, religious differences and their superstitious separatism."
