= Emidio Recchioni =

Italian anarchist (1864–1933)

Emidio Recchioni.

Emidio (Nemo) Recchioni (1864-1934) was an Anglo-Italian anarchist who was involved in a plot to assassinate Italian dictator Benito Mussolini. He was the father of anarchist Vernon Richards.

== Early life ==
Recchioni was born in Russi, which is approximately nine miles from Ravenna in Northern Italy. started work on the railways and became an anarchist under the influence of Cesare Agostinelli from Ancona, who was ten years older than him. Recchioni was politically active in Ancona with Agostinelli and fellow local comrades, and established contact with other comrades who included Errico Malatesta. As part of his activism, between 1890 and 1894, he contributed articles to the Livorno anarchist paper Sempre Avanti (Forever Forwards).

In Ancona in 1889, Agostinelli brought out the propaganda organ Il Libero Patto (The Free Pact) that attracted several young anarchists which included Recchioni and which 'transformed Anccona into the anarchist capital of Italy'. However, the anarchists 'became a source of concern to the authorities and would eventually pay dearly for their militancy'.

1894 proved to be an eventful year in Recchioni's life. It began in February with him founding L'art. 248 which, during its short life, published Malatesta's article Let us go to the people. (Note: Malatesta 1894 English translation available here, Errico Malatesta Let Us Go To The People.) However, in July the Italian parliament passed three laws that governed 'explosives, newspapers, and crimes against public order'. Of the laws, the third one was the most important because it 'empowered provincial commissions to condemn anarchists to domicilio coatto for up to five years by means of administrative procedure rather than criminal adjudication. During the next two years, perhaps three thousand anarchists - among them Agostinelli, Galleani, Palla, Pezzi, Recchioni, and Smorti - were condemned to languish in the squalid islands that hosted the coatti.' (Note: Heath n.d. referred to 'the prison colony on the Tremiti islands.') (Note: Recchioni was released from prison 'at the end of November 1896'. (Heath n.d.).)

After Recchioni returned to Ancona in November 1897, he founded L'Agitazione, an anarchist-socialist newspaper, which lasted from the March to the May of the following year. In the September he was arrested again and served the remainder of the previous prison term. He was released from prison in May 1899, when he left Italy forever and moved to London.

== Later life ==
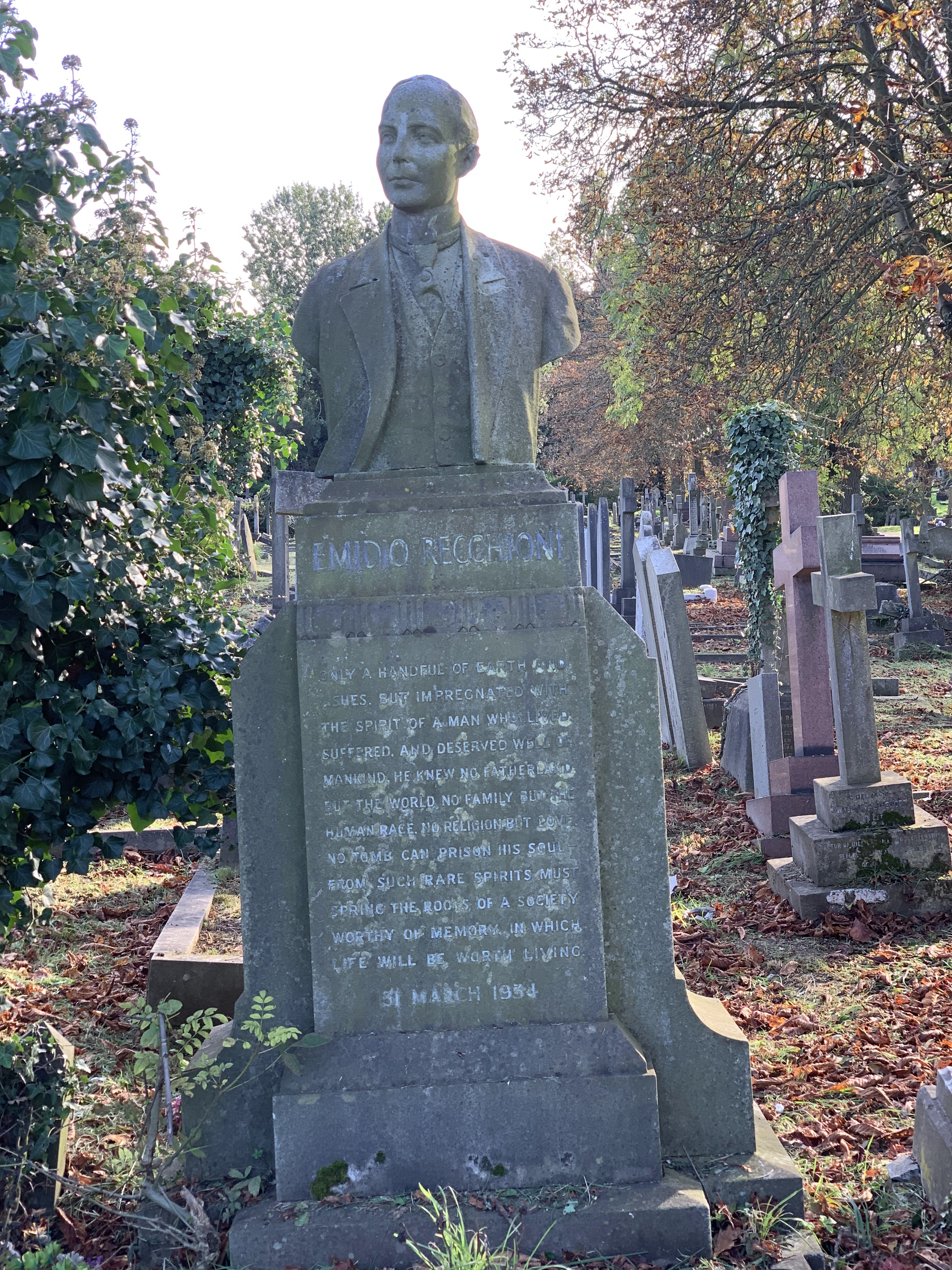
Gravestone of Emidio Recchioni at Kensal Green Cemetery in London.

Recchioni supported himself in London by working in a variety of jobs: as a shop assistant, a coal merchant and a wine seller. While he was doing so, in 1901, he contributed to a one-off publication, Cause ed Effetti, 1898–1900 (Causes and Effects), which was edited by Malatesta. (Note: Turcato 2014, p. 40 observed: 'This was a one-off publication that meant to provide an anarchist perspective on the killing of King Humbert I by the anarchist Gaetano Bresci, which occurred in Monza on 29 July 1900. The title translates as "causes and effects," and the date range that follows provides the key to the title: 1898 was the year of the bread riots that tragically ended in May with the cannon shots by which the troops of general Bava Beccaris killed hundreds of workers in Milan. A few weeks later, King Humbert conferred a decoration to the general for his services rendered "to the institutions and to civilization." That was the cause. Bresci's bullets, by which he avowedly intended to avenge the Milan bloodshed, were the effect.') By 1909, Recchioni was able to take over a shop in Old Compton Street, Soho that had been established in 1892 which was well known to his fellow émigrés as having been the first place in Britain to produce pasta. In November 1911 he married Constanza Benericetti and had a son, Vero Benvenuto Costantino Recchioni, who became known as Vernon Richards.

Later Recchioni was involved in a 1931 plot against the life of Benito Mussolini. Throughout his life, in addition to submitting articles to Sempre Avanti, he also participated in the editing of it and various other anarchist newspapers which included, in addition to L'art. 248 and L'Agitazione, La Protesta and L'Adunata dei refrettari.

He died in 1934 at Neuilly-sur-Seine, outside Paris, during a medical operation, and is buried in Kensal Green Cemetery.
