= Le Paysan de Paris =

1926 novel by Louis Aragon

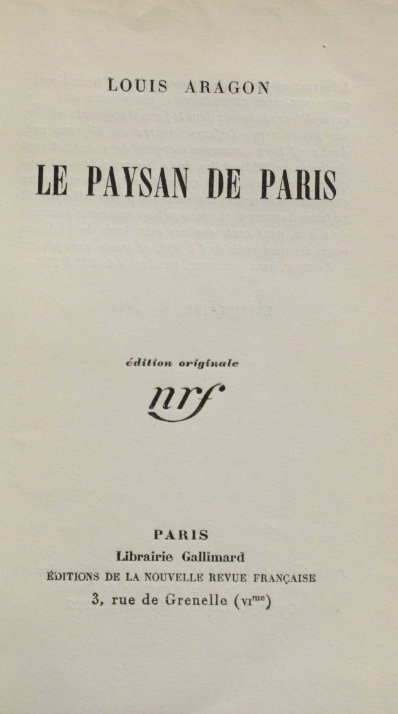
- Title page for Le Paysan de Paris (1926)
- Author: Louis Aragon
- Language: French
- Genre: Surrealism
- Publisher: Editions Gallimard
- Publication date: 1926
- English publication date: 1971

Le Paysan de Paris is a surrealist book about places in Paris. Written by Louis Aragon, it was first published in 1926 by Editions Gallimard. The book was first published in English in 1971 under the title Paris Peasant by Jonathan Cape, in a translation by Simon Watson Taylor, English member of the Surrealist movement.

The book was dedicated to the Surrealist painter André Masson and its preface was on the theme of a modern mythology. The two main sections of the books describe two places in Paris in great detail: Le Passage de l'Opera and Parc des Buttes-Chaumont. The detailed descriptions provide a realistic backdrop for surrealist spectacles, such as the transformation of a shop into a seascape in which a siren appears and then disappears. This literary device is le merveilleux quotidien — a contrast of the mundane with the marvellous.

Arnold Bennett described the work as stimulating but uneven. He thought it the best of the six books which he bought in Paris when visiting there in 1927. Walter Benjamin was deeply affected by the book, which became a point of departure for his unfinished magnum opus, The Arcades Project. Louis Aragon was disappointed with the book's reception by the French literary establishment which he considered too bourgeois and commercial.
