= Philip Sansom =

British conscientious objector (1916–1999)

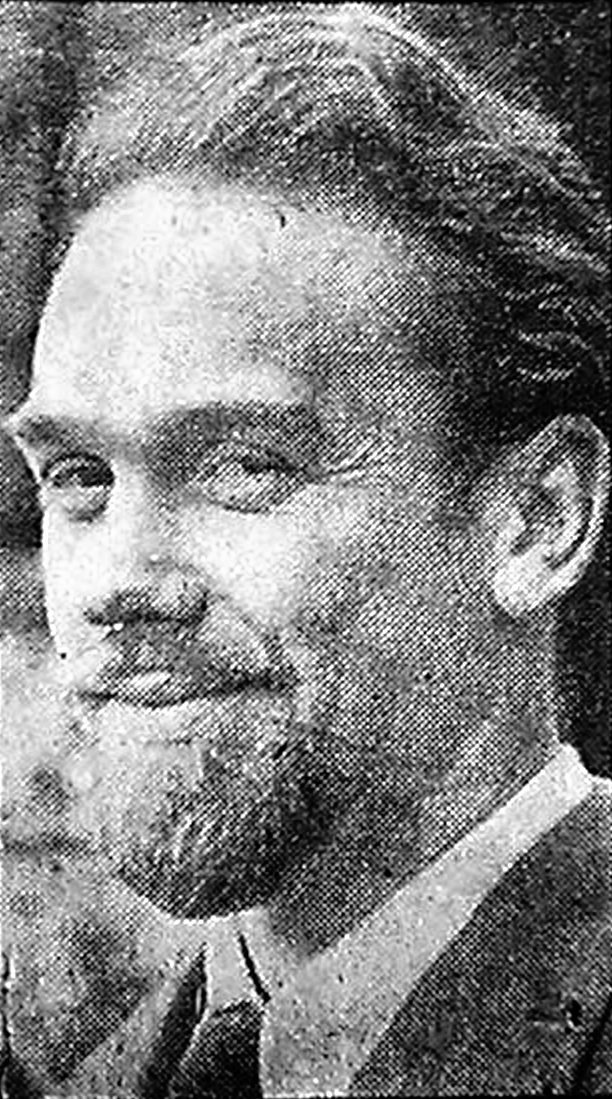
- Photo of Sansom published 1945
- Born: Philip Richard Sansom; 19 September 1916
- Died: 24 October 1999 (aged 83); London, England
- Occupations: Writer and editor
- Movement: Anarchist movement

Philip Richard Sansom (19 September 1916 – 24 October 1999) was an English conscientious objector, anarchist activist, surrealist, syndicalist, author, orator, cartoonist, editor and printer.

== Early life and education ==
Sansom was the son of John Sansom, lathe operator, and Lillian Sansom (née Underwood), occupation unknown, who lived in Hackney, London. He later lived in Wandsworth, London. After having been influenced by Education through art by Herbert Read, the art historian, he trained as a commercial artist in West Ham Technical College. Sansom (1987) recalled that at the time, in 1936, Read

"was already established as England’s leading writer on modern art in all its facets’ and that his books, The meaning of art, Art and industry and Art and society, were almost required reading for my generation of art students".

In the 1930s, Sansom worked as a commercial artist.

== Second World War ==
During the Second World War Sansom worked on the land in Kent as a registered conscientious objector. By 1943 he had returned to London where he encountered anarchism in the form of Marie Louise Berneri. He recalled:

"Marie Louise Berneri was the first anarchist I ever met. The first convinced, dedicated, working-for-the-movement anarchist, I mean. For she it was who opened the door when I rang the bell of the Freedom Press office one day in 1943, when I set out to discover what anarchism was and who the anarchists were."

Subsequently Sansom met Simon Watson Taylor, who introduced him to the London Surrealist Group which met each Wednesday evening in the private upper room of the Barcelona Restaurant in 17 Beak Street, Soho. Sansom joined the Group in 1944.

In 1945, Sansom was living in what he called a "ramshackle studio" in Camden Town, when he was invited to join the Anarchist Federation. Shortly after he had moved in, he was asked if he would mind if a comrade came to live with him. The comrade turned out to be John Olday, a brilliant idiosyncratic deserter from the Royal Pioneer Corps who was an anarchist activist, an author and, like Sansom, a cartoonist. Olday was English. However, he had grown up in Germany, where he became German-speaking and where he was extremely politically active. He fled the country to avoid arrest by the Gestapo. Now in London, he was contributing articles and cartoons to the anarchist journal War Commentary. But more substantially he was surreptitiously producing on the kitchen table of the studio his monthly Forces Newsletter which he distributed to the network of two hundred soldiers, sailors and airmen of War Commentary. (Note: Sansom 1977 recalled: "Every serving member of the forces who wrote in for literature received, in due course, a copy of John's Forces Newsletter which spelt out in greater depth and detail the subversive anarchist anti-war message.")

By the beginning of October 1944, Sansom and peace activist Laurie Hislam set off on a tour to promote Olday's collection of drawings, The March to Death, which by the end of the war sold 10,000 copies. And, like Olday, he contributed articles and cartoons to War Commentary. However, Sansom also joined Berneri, her husband Vernon Richards, and John Hewetson to became one of its editors. After he did so, he served two prison sentences in the following year. Initially, he served a two-month sentence in Brixton Prison, having been charged with ‘being in possession of an army waterproof coat and for failing to notify a change of address’. Then, very shortly afterwards he, with the other editors of War Commentary, were arrested and tried at the Old Bailey, the Central Criminal Court, for the offence of "the dissemination of three seditious issues of War Commentary under Defence Regulation 39a", for which they were found guilty. (Note: The funds to cover the legal costs for the editors were raised by the Freedom Press Defence Committee.) Sansom was sentenced to nine months imprisonment, which he served in Wormwood Scrubs.

== Post Second World War ==
Sansom's problems with the state did not finish with his release from prison. On the day before his release he was served with a notice requiring him to attend at 9 o'clock the following morning, within an hour of his release, for a medical examination for the army. On 18 January 1946 the Freedom Press Defence Committee circulated a letter which was signed by George Orwell and twenty-five public figures requesting that the ministers responsible correct the injustice of his call-up for military service. (Note: The letter is reprinted in Orwell 1998, pp. 48–49.) The letter was published on 18 January 1946 in the Manchester Guardian, Peace News and Tribune, on 21 January by the Daily Herald, on 26 January by Freedom and in the February/March issue of the bulletin of the Freedom Press Defence Committee.

On 22 February 1946, Tribune published the following letter by Sansom:

"It has been said that the price of Freedom is eternal vigilance and it is certainly true that if ever vigilance was responsible for any man's freedom it is for mine at the present moment. For it is clearly as a direct result of the protest made by the Freedom Defence Committee in the form of a letter published by you (Jan. 18. 1946), that the Home Secretary ordered my immediate release from prison last week (Feb. 11).

I am therefore writing to thank you for giving space to the publication of the disturbing circumstances surrounding my prosecution and to be asked to be allowed to express through your columns my hearfelt gratitude to the Committtee and the twenty-six signatories of the letter for so willingly giving their support in my defence." (Note: The letter is reprinted in Orwell 1998, p. 49.)

In 1946, with the help of Berneri, Sansom produced the surrealist review Free Unions/Unions Libres, the brainchild of Simon Watson Taylor, at Express Printers in Whitechapel. (Note: Levy 2003, p. 86 documented in detail the work that Sansom undertook.)

In 1951, Sansom produced the pamphlet Syndicalism: The workers’ next step. (Note: Excerpts of Sansom's pamphlet have been republished in Graham 2009.) He recalled that, within a "few weeks" of March 1952, The Anarchist-Syndicalist Committee, which comprised himself, Albert Meltzer, Rita Milton and Albert Grace, launched The Syndicalist. Sansom described it as "a small but brightly coloured little paper" and stated that it included contributions from various industries, including the docks, mining and engineering. The Syndicalist was short-lived; it only lasted a year. And it was not a Freedom Press publication. Nevertheless, it was published with its blessing. (Note: Two accounts have been published about The Syndicalist, one which is slightly different and one which is slightly more detailed. Ward, in Ward & Goodway 2014, p. 46 described it as "a supplement" to Freedom. And Barberis, McHugh & Tyldesley 2000, p. 420 observed: "The ASC (Anarcho-Syndicalist Committee) was a propaganda group which ran The Syndicalist monthly for a year. It subsequently appears to have united with a group producing a similar journal and was the precursor to the Black Flag group ....")

By 1953, the London Anarchist Group concluded that it needed a club. Sansom took a leading role in advancing the idea. And in the following February, Freedom announced that "it has been decided to call the club the Malatesta Club", after Errico Malatesta, the Italian anarchist. A cellar was located in Holborn, London. (Note: Rooum 2016, p. 7 recalled: "A dozen or more anarchists, brought together by Philip Sansom, ... spent six or seven weeks cleaning and preparing.") Chairs and tables were purchased, a cooker was installed, a sink was plumbed in and the cellar was painted. The club opened on 1 May 1954. (Note: See also Heath, Nick. n.d. The Malatesta Club.)

Sansom was a charismatic orator at Speakers' Corner in Hyde Park, London, and elsewhere in the 1950s and 1960s.

In 1978, Sansom enabled Freedom Press to publish the pamphlet Surrealism The hinge of history by Conroy Maddox, Pauline Drayson and John Welson. And he helped to run the London Gallery of the Belgian surrealist E.L.T. Mesens.

== Publications ==
1950s

- Syndicalism: The Workers' Next Step. London: Freedom Press. 1951.

1960s

- "Revolution adjourned" (PDF). Freedom. 29 (17): 1. 1968.

1970s

- "Revived 45: Anarchists against the army" (PDF). The Raven Anarchist Quarterly. 29 (8): 1–10. 1974.
- "Foreword" in Huggon, Jim (1977). Speakers' Corner An anthology. London: Kropotkin’s Lighthouse Publications.
- "Marie Louise Berneri A Tribute" (PDF). Zero. 1. London: Zero Collective: 9. 1977.
- "Printing sedition" (PDF). Freedom. 38 (17). 1977.

1980s

- "Introduction" in Wildcat Anarchist Comics. London: Freedom Press. 1985. ISBN 978-0-90-038430-1.
- "1945 - The victory against fascism and Freedom goes to jail". Freedom. 46 (6): 8. 1985.
- "Violence and hypocrisy" (PDF). Freedom. 46 (11): 8–9. 1985.
- "Freedom Press and the anarchist movement in the '50s and '60s". Freedom. 47 (9): 32–35. 1986. ISSN 0016-0504.
- "Surprise, surprise! A curate's egg!". The Raven Anarchist Quarterly. 1 (3): 267–279. 1987. ISSN 0951-4066.

1990s

- "John Hewetson: Appreciation Gentle liberator" (PDF). Freedom. 52 (1): 4–5. 1993.
- "Anarchists against hanging" in Rooum, Donald (2016, originally c.1993), "What is anarchism An Introduction". Second edition. Edited by Vernon Richards. PO Box 23912, Oakland, California: PM Press. ISBN 978-1-62963-146-2.
- With Bill Christopher, Jack Robinson and Peter Turner, "The relevance of anarchism". in Rooum, Donald (2016 originally c.1993), "What is anarchism An Introduction". Second edition. Edited by Vernon Richards. PO Box 23912, Oakland, California: PM Press. ISBN 978-1-62963-146-2.

== Archives ==
- Bishopsgate Institute Freedom Press Library
- Freedom Defence Committee
- Freedom Defence Committee, Jul 1945 - July 1946
- Freedom Press Newspaper Archive
- War Commentary (1939-1945)
