= Colin Ward =

British anarchist writer (1924–2010)

- Ward in his workroom, 2003
- Born: 14 August 1924; Wanstead, Essex, England
- Died: 11 February 2010 (aged 85)
- Education: Ilford County High School; Garnett College
- Occupations: Writer; Editor
- Notable work: Anarchy in Action (1973)
- Movement: Anarchism
- Spouse: Harriet Unwin (m. 1966)
- Partner: Vera Balfour (died 1963)

Colin Ward (14 August 1924 – 11 February 2010) was a British anarchist author and editor. He has been called "one of the greatest anarchist thinkers of the past half century, and a pioneering social historian."

== Early life ==
Ward was born in Wanstead, Essex, England, to Arnold and Ruby Ward (née West). Arnold was a teacher and Ruby a former clerical worker. (Note: Goodway (2014) in Ward & Goodway 2014, p. 1.) Both parents were active Labour Party supporters. Ward attended Ilford County High School, Essex leaving school aged 15 with no qualifications (Note: Ward in Ward & Goodway 2014, p. 72.), although he later obtained two A levels by taking evening classes. His first job was as a clerk for a builder who was fraudulently erecting air-raid shelters. (Note: Goodway in Ward & Goodway 2014, p. 2.) He then worked in the office of the Borough Engineer of Ilford Borough, where he encountered 'the inequitable treatment of council-house tenants' (Note: Ward in Ward & Goodway 2014, p. 2.). From there he began working for the architect Sidney Caulfield (Note: Ward in Ward & Goodway 2014, p. 2.), whose work Ward described as having 'dwindled to temporary repairs to factories in the East End of London' (Note: Ward in Ward & Goodway 2014, p. 24.).

In 1942, aged 18, Ward was conscripted into the army as a sapper, going on to work as a draughtsman in the Royal Engineers. In the following year he was based in Glasgow in the Army School of Hygiene.

== Later life ==
Ward was demobbed from the army in 1946, when he returned to working for Sidney Caulfield and began contributing to Freedom Press. From 1952 to 1961, he worked as an architect's assistant for Shepheard and Epstein. (Note: Epstein was Gabriel Epstein. Ward 2013 quoted his recommendation of her husband as 'our most senior architect ... an extremely competent architect of much experience'.) From 1961 Ward worked for two years as director of research for the architects Chamberlin, Powell and Bon. (Note: Ward elaborated on his work in architects' firms in 2003. (Ward & Goodway 2014, pp. 69–72).) In 1964 he undertook teacher training at the former Garnett College in Roehampton southwest London, where he met his future wife, Harriet Unwin. (Note: Goodway 2012, p. 315 documented that Harriet Unwin was the daughter of Dora Russell (the second wife of the philosopher Bertrand Russell with whom she had an open marriage) and Griffin Barry, a left-wing journalist, about whom she wrote a book (Ward 2003).) He subsequently began teaching at Wandsworth Technical College, in South London. In 1971, Ward became the Education Officer for the Town and Country Planning Association (TCPA). In 1979 he stopped working for the TCPA to become a full-time writer. (Note: Ward in Ward & Goodway 2014, p. 76.) His first two books were Violence (1970) and Work (1972). He wrote widely on education, architecture and town planning. His most influential book was The Child in the City (1978), about children's street culture. From 1995 to 1996, he was visiting Centenary Professor in the Department of Social Policy at the London School of Economics. In 2001, he was made an Honorary Doctor of Philosophy at Anglia Ruskin University.

== Ward's engagement with anarchism ==
Ward initially engaged with anarchism in 1943, when he was in serving in the army in Glasgow. Goodway (1963) observed that he 'received as "a real education" there: on account of the eye-catching deprivation, his use of the Mitchell Library and, as the only British city ever to have had a significant anarchist movement (in contrast to London's Continental exiles and Jewish immigrants), the dazzling anarchist orators on Glasgow Green with their Sunday-night meetings in a room above the Hangman's Rest in Wilson Street and bookshop in George Street.' (Note: Goodway in Ward & Goodway 2014, p. 4.) Ward began attending Glasgow Anarchist Group events. Shantz and Williams (2013) documented that Ward met Eddie Shaw, Jimmie Dick and Frank Leech. They also documented that Leech encouraged Ward 'to put together some articles for the London publication War Commentary - For Anarchism — published by Marie Louise Bernari of the Freedom Press Group ...'. Ward responded with his article Allied military government (Note: Ward in Ward & Goodway 2014, p. 2.), which was published under his own name in the mid-December 1943 issue of War Commentary, which was followed by articles which were also published under his own name in the following January, February and March. In April 1945 Ward was called as a witness for the prosecution in the trial of the paper's editors, John Hewetson, Vernon Richards and Philip Sansom. Shortly after the trial he was transferred to Orkney.

In 1947 Ward began editing the anarchist newspaper Freedom, the successor of War Commentary, and remained an editor of Freedom until 1960. In 1961 he founded the monthly anarchist journal Anarchy, which he edited from 1961 to 1970.

== Ward on anarchism ==
Ward's philosophy aimed at removing authoritarian forms of social organisation and replacing them with self-managed, non-hierarchical forms. This is based upon the principle that, as Ward put it, "in small face-to-face groups, the bureaucratising and hierarchical tendencies inherent in organisations have least opportunity to develop". (Note: Reproduced in Anarchy as Anarchism as a Theory of Organization (Ward 1966b).)

Anarchism for Ward was "a description of a mode of human organization, rooted in the experience of everyday life, which operates side by side with, and in spite of, the dominant authoritarian trends of our society". In contrast to many anarchist philosophers and activists, Ward held that "anarchism in all its guises is an assertion of human dignity and responsibility. It is not a programme for political change but an act of social self-determination."

=== Ward on education ===
In the chapter Schools No Longer in his 2018 (originally 1973) book Anarchy in Action, Ward discussed the genealogy of education and schooling, in particular the writings of Everett Reimer and Ivan Illich, and the beliefs of anarchist educator Paul Goodman. Many of Ward's writings in the 1970s, in particular Streetwork: The Exploding School (1973, with Anthony Fyson), focused on learning practices and spaces outside of the school building. In introducing Streetwork, Ward wrote, "[this] is a book about ideas: ideas of the environment as the educational resource, ideas of the enquiring school, the school without walls...”. In the same year, Ward contributed to the chapter The Role of the State to Education Without Schools (edited by Peter Buckman). He argued that "one significant role of the state in the national education systems of the world is to perpetuate social and economic injustice."

In The Child in the City (1978), and later The Child in the Country (1988), Ward "examined the everyday spaces of young people’s lives and how they can negotiate and re-articulate the various environments they inhabit. In his earlier text, the more famous of the two, Colin Ward explores the creativity and uniqueness of children and how they cultivate 'the art of making the city work'. He argued that through play, appropriation and imagination, children can counter adult-based intentions and interpretations of the built environment. His later text, The Child in the Country, inspired a number of social scientists, notably geographer Chris Philo (1992), to call for more attention to be paid to young people as a 'hidden' and marginalised group in society".

=== Ward on housing ===
In his 1976 book Housing: An Anarchist Approach, Ward criticized slum clearances, the municipalization programmes created by the Labour Party and the private landlord housing model. (Note: Jacobs 2025 documented that Freedom Press republished Housing: An anarchist approach (Ward 1976) with a postscript in 1983 (Ward 1983).) He advocated for an anarchist model of housing, citing squatting and housing co-operatives from Third World countries as a model for the anarchist movement.

== Publications ==
=== Articles ===
A very small sample of the many articles that Ward had published is listed below. Kinross (2012) may be consulted for a full listing of the ones that were published in Anarchy.

==== 1960s ====
- 1961 "Where the shoe pinches" (PDF). Anarchy (4): 97-116.
- 1961 (As C.W.) "Are we in favour of penal reform?". Anarchy. 9: 257-263.
- 1962 "The state and society". Anarchy. 14: 115-119.
- 1964 "Workers' control and the collective contract". Anarchy. 40: 180-184.
- 1965 (As C.W.) "Gustav Landauer". Anarchy. 54: 244-252.
- 1966 (As C.W.) "Peckham recollected". Anarchy. 60: 52-56.
- 1967 (As C.W.) "Do-it-yourself-anarchism 1: The anarchist idea". Anarchy. 77: 193-197.
- 1968 "Tenants take over a new strategy for council tenants". Anarchy. 83: 1-19.

==== 1970s ====
- 1970 "Instant anarchy: 3 Revolutionary moment". Anarchy. 116: 302-308.
- 1972 "The plotlanders". Oral History Journal. 13 (2): 57-70.

==== 1980s ====
- 1987 "The path not taken" (PDF). The Raven. 1 (3): 195-200.

=== Books ===
==== 1970s ====
- 1973 (With Anthony Fyson) Streetwork The exploding school. London: Routledge & Kegan Paul. 1973. ISBN 0 7100 7683 5.
- 1973 (As editor) Vandalism. London: The Architectural Press. 1973. ISBN 0 85139 700 X.
- 1974 (With Colin Smithson) Utopia. Harmondsworth, Middlesex: Penguin Education. 1974. ISBN 0140812369.
- 1974 Tenants take over. London: The Architectural Press. ISBN 0 85139 630 5.
- 1975 (As editor) Kropotkin, Peter. Fields, factories and workshops tomorrow. New York, NY: Harper & Row.
- 1976 (As editor) British school buildings Design and appraisals 1964-74. London: The Architectural Press. ISBN 0 85139 085 4.
- 1978 The child in the city. London: The Architectural Press. ISBN 0 85139 118 4.

==== 1980s ====
- 1982 (With Eileen Adams) Art and the built environment. Burnt Mill, Harlow, Essex: Longman Group. ISBN 0 582 36195 8.
- 1984 Housing is theft, Housing is freedom. Nottingham: Five Leave Publications. ISBN 0907123058.
- 1985 (With Dennis Hardy) "The Plotlanders". Oral History. 13 (2): 57-70.
- 1985 When we build again Let's have housing that works. London: Pluto Press. ISBN 0745300227.
- 1986 (With Dennis Hardy) Goodnight campers! The history of the British holiday camp. London: Mansell Publishing. ISBN 0-7201-1835-2.
- 1986 Chartres The making of a miracle. London: The Folio Society.
- 1987 (As editor) A decade of Anarchy (1961-1970). London: Freedom Press. ISBN 0900384379.
- 1989 Welcome thinner city Urban survival in the 1990s. London: Bedford Square Press. ISBN 0-7199-1252-0.
- 1989 (With Ruth Rendell) Undermining the central line. London: Chatto & Windus. ISBN 0701135980.

==== 1990s ====
- 1990 Talking houses Ten lectures. London: Freedom Press. ISBN 0900384557.
- 1990 (Originally 1988) The child in the country. London: Hale. ISBN 0719912903.
- 1991 (With Tim Ward) Images of childhood in old postcards. Far Thrupp, Gloucestshire: Alan Sutton. ISBN 0-86299-865-4.
- 1991 Influences Voices of creative dissent. Hartland, Bideford, Devon: Green Books. ISBN 1-870098-43-9.
- 1991 Freedom to Go: after the motor age. London: Freedom Press. ISBN 0 900384 61 1.
- 1993 New Town Home Town. London: Calouste Gulbenkian Foundation. ISBN 0903319624. (Note: BBC Television used New Town Home Town as the basis for the documentary Where we live now. Episode 3 New Town Home Town which Ward presented.)
- 1995 Talking schools. London: Freedom Press. ISBN 0 900384 81 6.
- 1997 Stamps: Designs For Anarchist Postage Stamps (illustrated by Clifford Harper)
- 1997 Havens and springboards (PDF). London: Calouste Gulbenkian Foundation. ISBN 0 903319 82 9.
- 1997 Reflected in water: A crisis of social responsibility. London: Cassell. ISBN 0304335681.
- 1998 (With Peter Hall) Sociable cities The legacy of Ebenezer Howard. Chichester, West Sussex: John Wiley & Sons. ISBN 0-471-98505-8.

==== 2000s ====
- 2000 (Originally 1996) Social policy An anarchist response. London: Freedom Press. ISBN 9780900384981.
- 2002 Cotters and squatters Housing's hidden history (PDF). Nottingham: Five Leaves. ISBN 0907123198.
- 2003 (With David Goodway) Talking anarchy. Nottingham: PM Press. ISBN 978-1-60486-812-8.
- 2004 Anarchism A very short introduction. Oxford: Oxford University Press. ISBN 0-19-280477-4.
- 2004 (With Dennis Hardy) Arcadia for all. Nottingham: Five Leaves Publications. ISBN 0 907123 59 7.

==== 2010s ====
- 2011 (With Damian F. White and Chris Wilbert) Autonomy, solidarity, possibility The Colin Ward reader. Edinburgh: AK. ISBN 9781849350204.
- 2012 Talking green. Nottingham: Five Leaves. ISBN 9781907869518.

==== 2020s ====
- 2022 (Originally 1996) Talking to architects. London: Freedom Press. ISBN 978-1-904491-43-9.
- 2023 (originally 1988) (With David Crouch) The allotment Its landscape and culture (New ed.). Bridport: Little Toller Books. ISBN 9781915068231.
