= Marie Louise Berneri =

Anarchist writer (1918–1949)

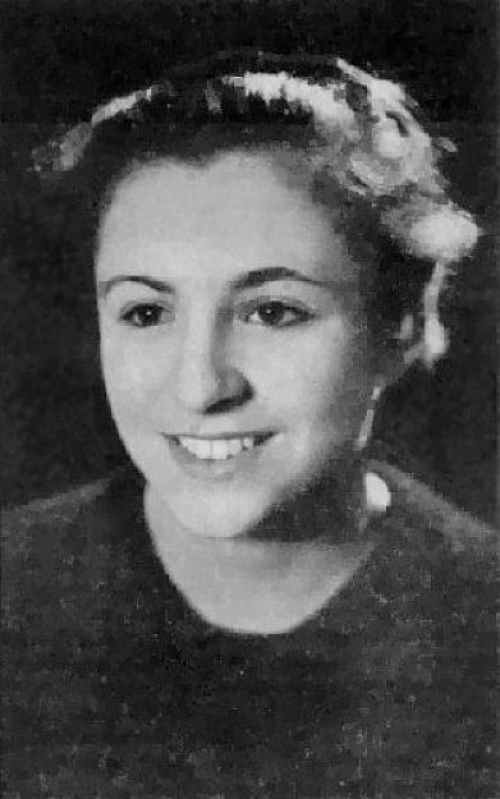
- Born: Maria Luisa Berneri; 1 March 1918; Arezzo, Kingdom of Italy
- Died: 13 April 1949 (aged 31); London, England
- Education: The Sorbonne
- Occupations: Activist; Author; Psychologist
- Movement: Anarchism
- Spouse: Vernon Richards (m. 1937)
- Parents: Camillo Berneri (father); Giovanna Berneri (mother)
- Relatives: Giliane Berneri (sister)

Marie Louise Berneri (born Maria Luisa Berneri; 1 March 1918 – 13 April 1949) was an anarchist activist and author. She was born in Arezzo, 50 miles southeast of Florence Italy, the elder daughter of two extremely well-known anarchist parents, Camillo Berneri, an anti-fascist activist, and his wife Giovanna Berneri, a militant libertarian anarchist. However, she spent much of her life in Spain and Paris before she settled in London with anarchist activist Vernon Richards. In London she became a member of the editorial collectives of Spain and the World, Revolt! Incorporating Spain and the World, War Commentary and Freedom, to all of which she contributed many articles. She wrote a survey of utopias, Journey Through Utopia, which was first published in 1950 and re-issued in 2020. Neither East Nor West, a collection of her articles in War Commentary and Freedom, was first published in 1952 and republished in 1988.

== Early life in Italy and France ==
Camillo Berneri took his family, his wife and two daughters (Note: Berneri's younger sister was Giliane. "Berneri, Giliana, 1919-1998". Data on the Berneri's family and their comrades are available in the Italian "Berneri Family-Aurelio Chessa Archive". Archived from the original on 21 June 2012..), into exile in Paris, France after Benito Mussolini, the Italian dictator, seized power in 1922. In Paris the family home became a centre of anti-fascist activities and Bernari and her sister grew up in an environment which was highly politicised. In 1931, she met Richards, with whom she fell in love and maintained a long-distance correspondence. Having adopted the French equivalents of her forenames, Marie Louise, Berneri, passed her baccalauréat and enrolled in the Sorbonne University, where she studied political science and psychology. Also, with comrades of various nationalities, she attended lectures on anarchism which were given by the Russian anarchist Volin. In early May 1937, Berneri's father was assassinated by communist gunmen in Barcelona in Spain. Berneri responded by organizing a meeting in memory of him which was attended by more than six thousand people. Shortly aftwards she left Paris and moved to London to be with Richards.

== Life in London ==
In London Berneri moved in with Richards, who she married shortly afterwards to gain British citizenship. In 1939 she had her first article in War Commentary published. Around 1941 she met George Woodcock, who Herbert Read described her to him as being 'one of the most important members of the Freedom group.' By the April of 1945 Berneri had become was one of the four editors of War Commentary, who were tried for the crime of incitement to disaffection. Richards and Berneri were worried that, if they all became imprisoned, there would be nobody left to run War Commentary. Consequently Berneri asked George Woodcock, who had contributed articles to it, if he would become its editor. Because Berneri's husband was a co-defendant, she was acquitted on a legal technicality that allows that a wife cannot conspire with her husband. Consequently, Berneri was able to join Woodcock to become a co-editor with him.

Woodcock (1982) recalled:

'We edited the paper. We read the piles of radical rhetoric that were submitted in the form of articles, and because little of it was up to our standards, we wrote much of the paper ourselves in joint day-long sessions fuelled by strong Italian coffee. We took the copy to the typesetter who operated at the top of an old warehouse in Covent Garden; we read the proofs; we did the layout of each issue; and then we looked after its production in the antiquated printing house in the East End that the Freedom Group had bought for a song in a bankruptcy sale.' (Note: The address of the printing house was 84a Whitechapel High Street, which was on the corner of Whitechapel High Street and Angel Alley, to be precise the eastern side of it. (Woodcock 1982, p. 268).)

In 1948 Berneri attended the first post-war International Anar chist Conference in Paris as a member of the British delegation. Her mother and sister (medical doctor Giliane Berneri) also attended as members of the Italian and French delegations. She received much praise for her Freedom Press pamphlet, the anti-Stalinist Workers in Stalin's Russia (1944). She was also one of the first people in Britain to promote the ideas of Wilhelm Reich. (Note: Woodcock 1986, p. 383. See her 1943 Sexuality and freedom below.)

== Death ==
In December 1948 Berneri gave birth at home to a boy, who died shortly afterwards. She died on 13 April 1949 at the age of 31, from heart failure, after having contracted a viral infection during childbirth. With the sole exception of the first paragraph by N W and H B, and ignoring the first paragraph, Ed (2004) reproduced their obituary of Berneri. She was cremated at Kensal Green Cemetery and her ashes were scattered in a North London park. Berneri had four languages: Italian, French, Spanish and English. Fellow English anarchist Colin Ward (2014) reflected: 'I have often wondered about the books she might have written but for the tragedy of her death'. George Woodcock, the Canadian-born anarchist with whom Berneri closely collaborated, was the last person he said goodbye to before he and his wife left to sail for Canada. He recalled in his 1982 Letter to the past, the first volume of his autobiography, that they discussed the possibility of continuing their collaboration by writing letters to each other recounting their respective childhoods which some day they might publish as a dialogue, which he alluded to in the title of his book.

== Tributes ==
Shortly after Berneri's death, her friends formed the Marie Louise Berneri Memorial Committee and in 1949 published the book Marie Louise Berneri 1918-1949. A Tribute, which contains multiple international tributes to her. One tribute, by Anarchist Press Group (pp. 19–27), was subsequently republished in a 1993 issue of The Raven identifying anarchist physician John Hewetson as the author. Several authors have subsequently quoted the following sentence from the tribute: {{block indent|'Throughout the war, whether she was in the editorial chair or had temporarily relinquished it to other comrades, she was the principal theoretical influence behind War Commentary, and afterwards Freedom.’ (Note: Hewetson's tribute was subsequently published in a 1993 issue of The Raven. (Hewetson 1993).)

In 1950, George Woodcock and Ivan Avakumović dedicated their book The anarchist prince A biographical study of Peter Kropotkin to Marie-Louise Berneri, who they described as 'a true disciple of Kropotkin, who died on the 13th April, 1949'. In 1952 her book Journey Through Utopia was published posthumously with a Forewword by George Woodcock. In 1952 the Marie Louise Berneri Memorial Committee published Neither East Nor West, a collection of fifty-one of her articles from War Commentary, in the foreword to which the editor stated:

'it is, to our knowledge, the only work in print in which the author takes up an uncompromising position in opposition to both the Western Powers and their hangers-on, and the Soviet Union and its satellites.'

In 1977 Philip Sansom paid the following tribute to her: 'She was quite exceptional — as a friend, as a comrade, as a militant revolutionary and as a thinker.' In 1986 W and B observed in their obituary of her: 'From 1936 until her death twelve years later, every activity undertaken by Freedom Press was infused by Marie Louise Berneri's personality.'

In 2012 David Goodway described her as 'outstandingly gifted'. In 2018 Kimberly Croswell observed: 'Articulate, insightful, and accessible, Berneri had a readership that spanned the globe. Her influence as a significant critical thinker, radical, and humanitarian continues to this day.' Also: 'Marie Louise Berneri was a woman of her time, yet in addressing the pressing matters of the moment, she asserted the timelessness of the anarchist values of freedom and empathy.'

== Publications ==
=== Selected articles ===
==== 1939 ====
- "Will America rule the world?" (PDF). War Commentary. 1 (2). London: Freedom Press Distributors: 7–8. 1939.

==== 1940s ====
- "More documents on the Spanish tragedy" (PDF). War Commentary. 1 (3). London: Freedom Press Distributors: 14–16. 1940.
- Peter Kropotkin His federalist ideas. London: Freedom Press. 1942 [originally 1922].
- "Record of the Third International" (PDF). War Commentary. 4 (15). London: Freedom Press: 10–11. 1943.
- "Lessons of the Spanish revolution" (PDF). War Commentary. 4 (18). London: Freedom Press: 10–12. 1943.
- "Italy after 1918 The revolutionary period 1919-1921" (PDF). War Commentary. 4 (21). London: Freedom Press: 10–11. 1943.
- "The rise of fascism in Italy". War Commentary. 4 (22). 1943.
- "Sexuality and freedom". Now. 5: 54–60. 1943. (Note: Reprinted in Anarchy 105 (November), pp. 334-342, see here. (Accessed 29 July 2025.))
- "The historical background: Brenan's Spanish labyrinth". Anarchy 5. July. London: Freedom Press: 137–143. 1961 [originally 1944].

=== Books ===
- Workers in Stalin's Russia (PDF). London: Freedom Press. 1944.
- Journey Through Utopia. London: Routledge & Kegan Paul Ltd. 1950. OCLC 466380107.
- Neither East nor West. London: Freedom Press for the Marie Louise Berneri Memorial Committee. 1952. OCLC 1221495736.
- Neither East nor West (2nd ed.). London: Freedom Press. 1988. ISBN 0900384425.

== Archives ==
- Berneri, Marie Louise (1918-1949) at the Kate Sharpley Library
- Bishopsgate Institute Freedom Press Library
- Freedom Defence Committee, Jul 1945 - July 1946
- Freedom Press Newspaper Archive
- Marie-Louise Berneri page at Libcom
- Marie-Louise Berneri page at Marxists.org
- Marie-Louise Berneri. The Anarchist Encyclopedia at Recollection Books.
- War Commentary (1939-1945)

Media offices
Preceded by John Turner	Editor of Freedom; 1936–1949	Succeeded by Vernon Richards & Colin Ward
