= Freedom Press =

Anarchist publishing house in London, England

Coordinates: 51.5161°N 0.0707°W

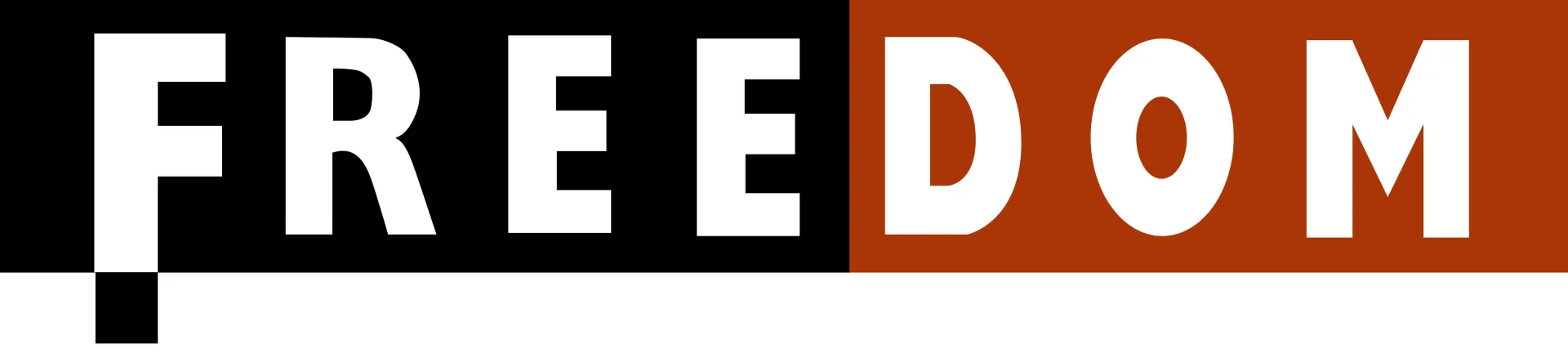

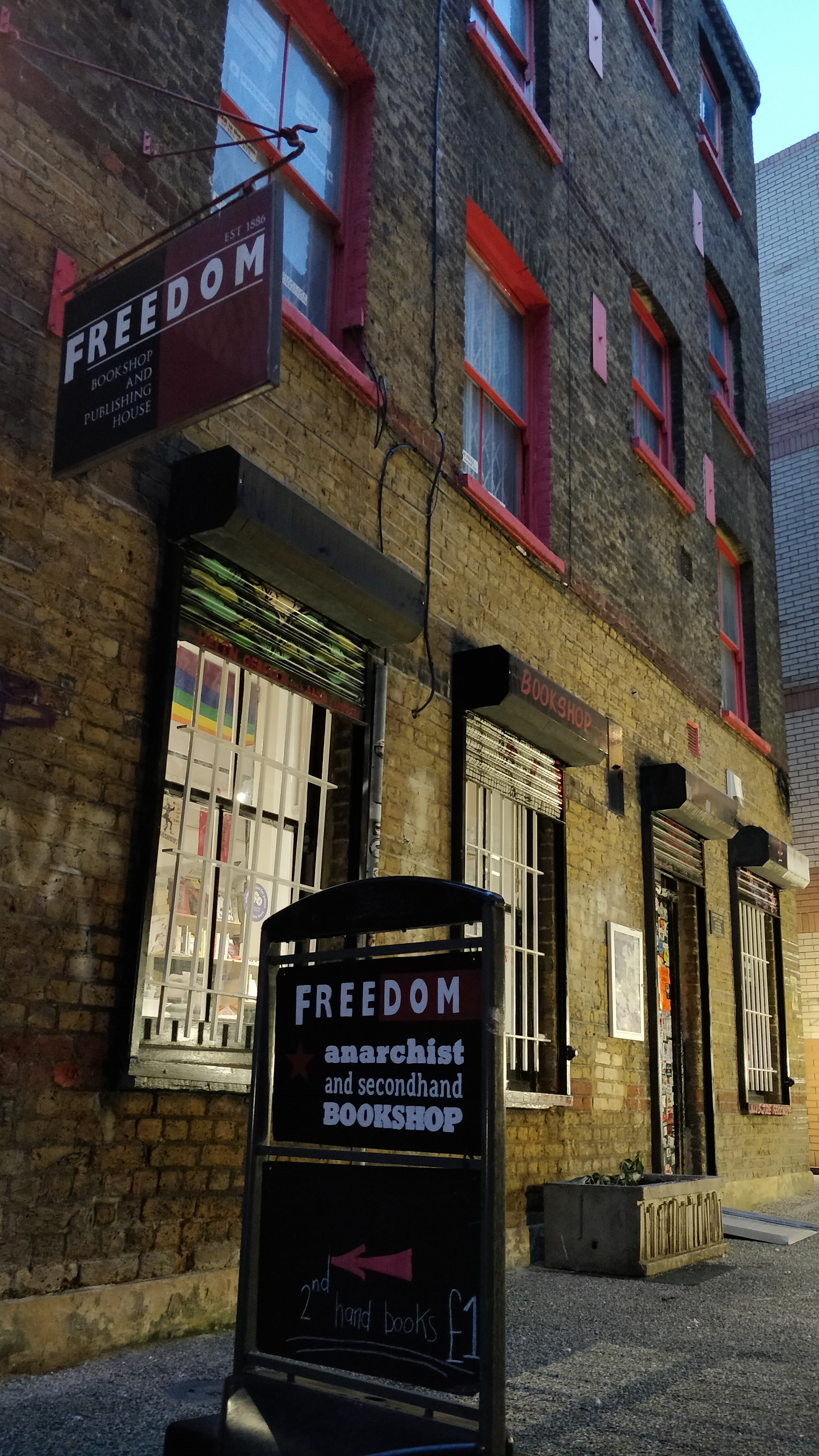
- Industry: Publishing
- Genre: Politics
- Founded: London, United Kingdom, 1886
- Founder: Charlotte Wilson
- Headquarters: 84b Whitechapel High Street, London, UK
- Website: freedompress.org.uk

Freedom Press is an anarchist publishing house and bookseller in Whitechapel, London, United Kingdom, founded in 1886.

It publishes Freedom, the world's oldest anarchist paper. Formerly a monthly or bi-weekly, it now appears twice a year alongside a daily web newswire appearing since 2014.

Other regular publications by Freedom Press have included Anarchy, Spain and the World, Revolt! and War Commentary.

Previous editors at Freedom Press have included Charlotte Wilson, Tom Keell, Colin Ward, Vernon Richards and Rob Ray. The current editor is Uri Gordon.

== History ==
=== 1886–1918 ===
The core group which went on to form Freedom Press came out of a circle of anarchists with international connections formed around the London-based radical firebrand Charlotte Wilson, a Cambridge-educated writer and public speaker who was in the process of breaking from Fabian Society orthodoxy. Among this founding group were Nikola Chaikovski, Francesco Saverio Merlino, and as of 1886, celebrated anarchist-communist Peter Kropotkin, who had been invited to Britain by Wilson after his release from prison in France in January of that year.

Wilson led a group of anarchists in founding Freedom as a social anarchist and anarchist communist group in September 1886, just a month after losing a vote in which the Fabians formally backed the parliamentary route to socialism. Alongside starting Freedom newspaper as a monthly beginning in October, the group also produced other pamphlets and books, primarily translations of international writers including Errico Malatesta, Jean Grave, Gustav Landauer, Max Nettlau, Domela Nieuwenhuis, Émile Pouget, Varlaam Cherkezov, Emma Goldman, Alexander Berkman Pierre-Joseph Proudhon, Mikhail Bakunin and of course, Kropotkin himself. Discussion groups and public meetings were also begun early on.

In the early years of the paper Wilson funded and edited it out of a number of different offices while Kropotkin became a regular writer and provided its star turn. In 1895, Wilson resigned after a long series of personal difficulties and Alfred Marsh, a violinist, took over.

Marsh solidified the press alongside close collaborator William Wess, and they were joined by ex-members of the defunct Socialist League's publication, Commonweal: John Turner, Tom Cantwell, and Joseph Presburg. Marsh was able to acquire more permanent premises and printing facilities at 127 Ossulston Street in 1898. Freedom collective member Donald Rooum notes:

"Freedom Press stayed in Ossulston Street for the next 30 years. The hand-operated press dated from about 1820, and needed three operators: two to load the paper and pull the handle, and one to take the paper off."

With the acquisition of its own press, albeit an elderly one, the group was able to publish more often, and in 1907 started a second paper, Voice of Labour, which allowed former Spectator compositor Thomas Keell to become a permanent collective member, eventually taking over editorial duties at the paper in 1910 as Marsh's health declined.

Freedom became one of the most widely read anarchist publications in the period leading up the First World War; however, the collective split in 1914–15 over how anarchists should respond to the conflict, with Keel's anti-militarist position winning the backing of a majority of the national movement and Kropotkin leaving after he came out in favour of an Allied victory, a stance which would see him put his name to the Manifesto of the Sixteen in 1916. Keell and his companion Lilian Wolfe would go on to be imprisoned for the paper's staunch opposition to the war in 1916, though Wolfe was quickly released.

=== 1918–1945 ===
As with many other anarchist enterprises, Freedom had trouble maintaining itself after the war ended as many activists had died and the seeming success of Marxist-Leninism in Russia drew British radicals into the orbit of an ascendant Communist Party of Great Britain. While donations allowed it to remain solvent for over a decade and several of its core group remained, notably John Turner who became its publisher from 1930 until his death in 1934, a crushing blow came in 1928 when the Ossulston Street building was demolished as part of a slum clearance scheme. Keell retired shortly afterward and while the collective continued to publish, it produced only an irregular newsletter over the course of the next eight years

The paper was relaunched 10 years later as energy and interest in the anarchists swelled around the Spanish Civil War, beginning with the publication of a fortnightly publication, Spain And The World (1936–38), which was renamed to Revolt!, and then War Commentary (1939–45), before being renamed back to Freedom in August 1945. It was edited by Vero Recchioni (who later changed his name to Vernon Richards), the son of an Italian anarchist, and Marie Louise Berneri, the daughter of Camillo Berneri, an Italian anarchist who was assassinated in Spain. The Italian anarchist movement had been well-established in London since the 1920s.

Much of the bookshop's history through this time was tied up with Richards, who was the driving force behind both the press and the newspaper from the 1930s until late in the '90s. Richards teamed up with Keel and Wolff as publisher and administrator respectively - the latter would remain so until the age of 95. In 1942, the press was able to buy a printing firm, Express Printers, at 84a Whitechapel High Street, which it did with the help of a rival printing firm and a supporters' group, the Anarchist Federation, which would become the nominal owner of the title until it declared itself autonomous in the 1950s. With an avowedly anti-war stance, the paper would continue to publish throughout the war, and would face prosecution for its stance only in peacetime Britain.

=== Post-War ===
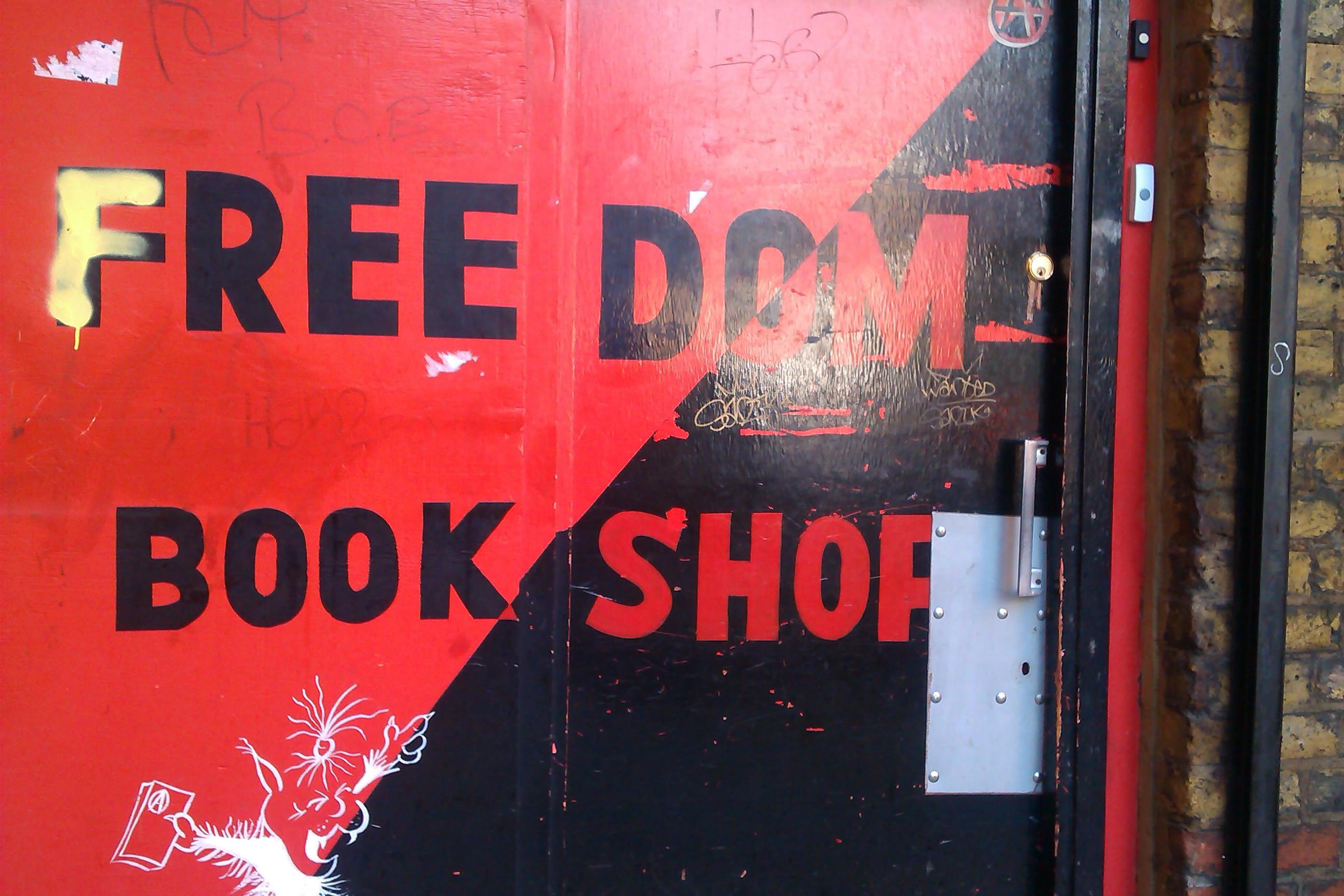
The Freedom Press door in 2014

War Commentary was published with an overtly anti-militarist message, co-operating heavily with the pacifist movement, and in November 1944 the homes of several collective members were raided along with the offices of the press itself. When Richards, Marie-Louise Berneri, John Hewetson and Philip Sansom were arrested at the beginning of 1945 for attempting "to undermine the affections of members of His Majesty's Forces," Benjamin Britten, E. M. Forster, Augustus John, George Orwell, Herbert Read (chairman), Osbert Sitwell and George Woodcock set up the Freedom Press Defence Committee to "uphold the essential liberty of individuals and organizations, and to defend those who are persecuted for exercising their rights to freedom of speech, writing and action."

In 1961, Freedom began producing Anarchy, a well-regarded series with noted front pages designed by Rufus Segar and seven years later the Press moved to its current premises at 84b Whitechapel High Street after Whitechapel Art Gallery bought out 84A. At this point the Press was entirely owned and run by Richards. However, in 1982 he transferred ownership of the building to The Friends of Freedom Press, a company which was limited by guarantee and without share capital. Richards also relinquished control over the paper's running from 1968, though would return periodically in editorially difficult moments and retained overall control of the Press.

In 1981, the printing function of the Press was once again lost, with several members of the printing collective spinning off those functions into Aldgate Press using money raised by Richards.

The bookshop was repeatedly attacked in the 1990s by neo-fascist group Combat 18 during street conflicts between fascist and anti-fascist groups in the East End and eventually firebombed in March 1993. The building still bears some visible damage from the attacks, and metal guards have been installed on the ground floor windows and doors, intended to ward against any further violence.

A second arson attack occurred on 1 February 2013, causing significant damage, but no-one was hurt. Donations allowed the Press to survive; however, cash losses from the paper forced its closure as a monthly publication in 2014, though free versions of the paper continue to be produced. In 2017, the press launched an archive, digitising more than 1,500 back issues of the paper covering the 1886–2020 period.

In March 2018, Freedom was made a core participant in the Undercover Policing Inquiry, following confirmation that former undercover Met officer Roger Pearce had written in the paper in 1980–81, mostly on Northern Ireland.

== Organisation ==
Today Freedom Press remains as a functioning publishing house with much of its printing still being done by Aldgate Press. The Freedom collective runs an open meeting and exhibition space called Decenter, alongside maintaining an archive, bookshop and website. It shares the premises with Dog Section Press, the Anarchist Federation, the National Bargee Travellers Association, the Advisory Service for Squatters and Corporate Watch. The archive of the press is held at Bishopsgate Library, and much correspondence from its early period can be found at the International Institute of Social History in Amsterdam.

== Authors and notable writers ==
Having had a close affinity with Colin Ward and Vernon Richards, Freedom Press has produced much of their extensive back catalogue, in addition to titles by Clifford Harper, Nicolas Walter, Murray Bookchin, Gaston Leval, William Blake, Errico Malatesta, Harold Barclay and many others, including 118 issues of the journals Anarchy, edited by Colin Ward and 43 issues of The Raven: Anarchist Quarterly.

Over the years the Freedom editorial group has included Jack Robinson, Pete Turner, Colin Ward, Nicolas Walter, Alan Albon, John Rety, Nino Staffa, Dave Mansell, Gillian Fleming, Mary Canipa, Philip Sansom, Arthur Moyse, John Lawrence and many others. Clifford Harper maintained a loose association for 30 years.

Subjects of recent books include Emiliano Zapata, Nestor Makhno, Anti-Fascist Action and in 2021 the autobiography of "Greek Robin Hood" Vassilis Palaiokostas. At the end of 2018 the press published A Beautiful Idea: History of the Freedom Press Anarchists, to mark its 50th year at 84b Angel Alley. Notable modern authors include the Spanish political philosopher Thomas Ibanez (Anarchism is Movement, 2019) and anthropologist Brian Morris (A Defence of Anarchist Communism, 2022).

== Published works ==
Among the most popular books published by the press are:

- Birchall, Sean (2011). Beating the fascists. ISBN 190449112X.
- Crute, Charles, ed. (1991). The state is your enemy Selections from the Anarchist Journal Freedom 1965-86. ISBN 0 900384 57 3.
- Kropotkin, Peter (1974). Ward, Colin (ed.). Fields, factories and workshops tomorrow.
- Malatesta, E. (1942). Anarchy (Seventh ed.).
- Ray, Rob, ed. (2019). Why work Arguments for the leisure society (Third ed.). Oakland, California; London: PM Press and Freedom Press. ISBN 978-1-62963-576-7.
- Richards, Vernon (1998). George Orwell at home (and Among the Anarchists) Essays and photographs. London: Freedom Press. ISBN 0900384948.
- Rocker, Rudolf (1988) [originally 1973]. Walter, Nicholas (ed.). Anarchism and anarch-syndicalism. ISBN 0 900384 45 X.
- Rooum, Donald (1985). Wildcat Anarchist Comics. London: Freedom Press. ISBN 0 900384 301.
- Ward, Colin (1996). Anarchy in action (Second ed.). ISBN 0 900384 20 4.

== Gallery ==
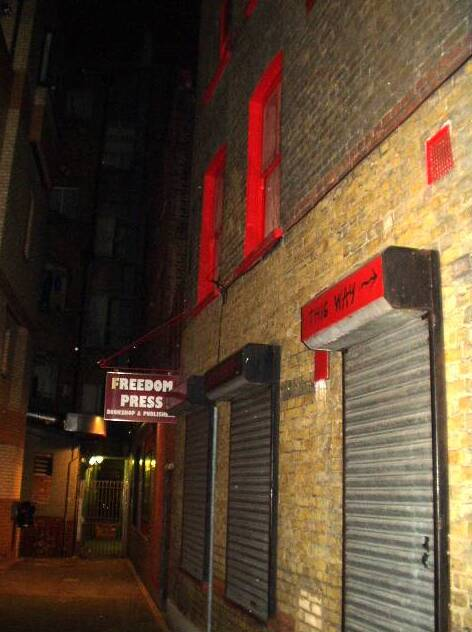
Outside the Freedom Press building at night, 2006

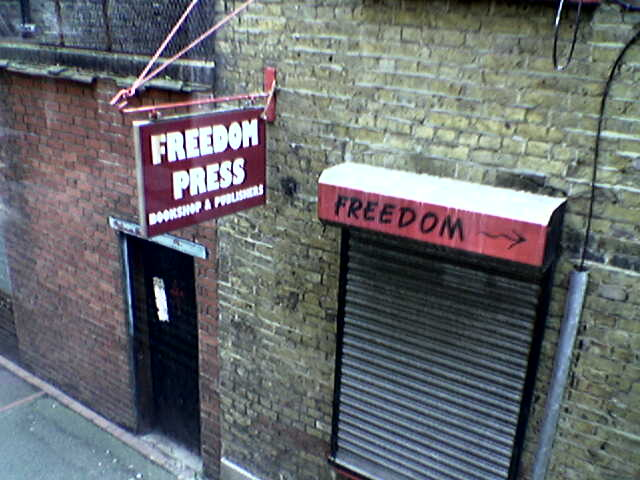
Freedom Press sign before the 2013 fire

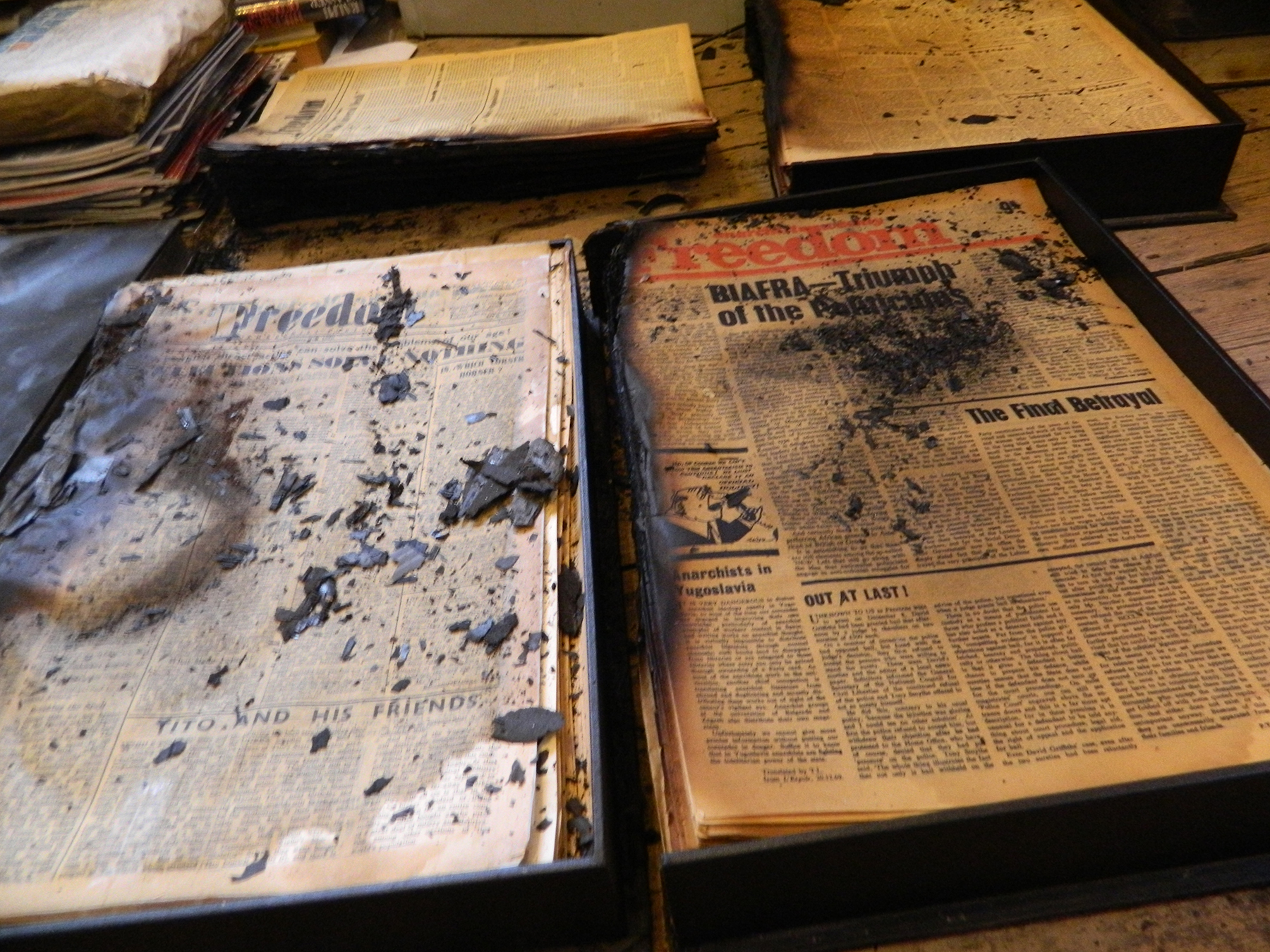
Burned Freedom Press Archives in 2013
