= John Hewetson =

British anarchist (1913–1990)

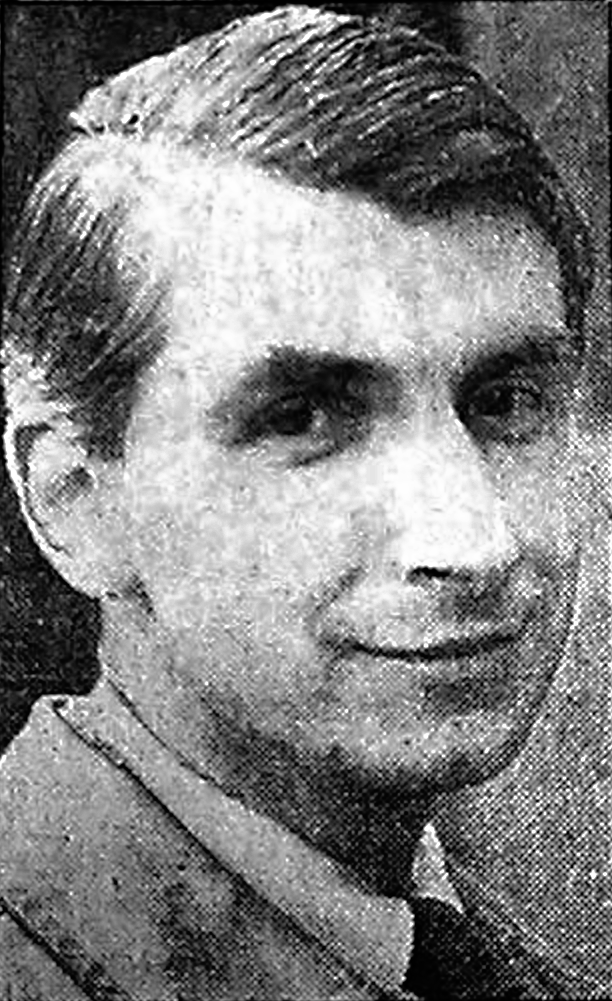
- Photo of Hewetson published in 1945
- Born: John Christopher Hewetson; 10 January 1913; Birmingham, England
- Died: 20 December 1990 (aged 77); Surrey, England
- Education: Shrewsbury School; Magdalen College, Oxford
- Occupations: Physician; Writer; Editor
- Movement: Anarchism
- Spouse: Phyllis E. Hawling (m. 1975)
- Partner: Dorothy 'Peta' Edsall

John Christopher Hewetson (10 January 1913 – 20 December 1990) was a British anarchist physician, writer and newspaper editor. During the Second World War he was an editor of the anarchist newspaper War Commentary, which saw him imprisoned on three occasions. From the 1940s onwards he was active in advocating for freely available contraception and abortions.

== Early life ==
Hewetson was born in Birmingham to a wealthy family and was educated at Shrewsbury School, Shropshire in the West Midlands before studying medicine at Magdalen College, at the University of Oxford. In the run up to the Second World War he became active in the Forward Movement of the Peace Pledge Union with his companion Peta Edsall.

== Anarchism ==
Hewetson became involved with anarchism in London in 1939. (Note: Glasgow calls all workers to defence of the four London anarchists. War Commentary. Volume 6. Number 10. 10th March 1945. 1.) In the following year the first issue of Volume 2 (November 1940) of the newspaper War Commentary, which was printed in North London, included the article Left Movements and the War, III : The Communist Party, which was followed in the following month by the article Left Movements and the War, IV. The Forth International. (Note: The articles were preceded by two articles written by M. L. B., which in turn were preceded by an article written by M. L. Berneri (Marie Louise Berneri).) Both articles were signed J. H.. They were followed by two further articles in February and July 1941 which were signed J. H., and one in August 1941 which was signed J. H. [John Hewetson]. Canadian-born writer George Woodcock observed that during the period 1941 and 1945, the leading members of the Freedom Press group comprised six people. They were two couples, Marie Louise Berneri and her husband Vernon Richards, Hewetson and his companion Peta Edsall, and two individuals: Tom Brown, the anarcho-syndicalist and trade unionist, and Albert Meltzer. Woodcock also observed that anarchists Philip Sansom and Colin Ward joined the group about the same time that he did. (Note: Sansom (1977) recalled that Marie Louise Berneri was the first anarchist that he ever met. In his words, he 'set out to discover what anarchism was and who the anarchists were' and, on ringing the bell of the Freedom Press office (in the former Red Lion Passge in Belsize Road), she 'opened the door'. (Sansom 1977).)

During 1940 Hewetson was imprisoned for a week for selling a working class paper outside Hyde Park having refused to pay a £1 fine. (Note: Hewetson wrote an account of his imprisonment in a short article which he had published in the British Medical Journal under the pseudonym which is headed London, with the subheading Conscientious Objector. (London 1982)) In 1942 he was imprisoned for two months for refusing to accept a commission in the Royal Army Medical Corps. (Note: Glasgow calls all workers to defence of the four London anarchists. War Commentary. Volume 6. Number 10. 10th March 1945. 1.)

In April 1945, Hewetson, and fellow War Commentary contributors Richards and Sansom, were charged with inciting dissafection among his majesty's forces under Defence Regulation 39a. At the time of his arrest he was working as a casualty officer in Paddington Hospital, in Central London treating the victims of the bombing. Hewetson was sentenced to nine months imprisonment.

The four day trial at the Old Bailey saw significant press coverage and public controversy. Also, the arrests led to the formation of the prominent Freedom Defence Committee. Following lobbying by Dr Charles Wortham Brook and Rhys Davies MP, both unknown to Hewetson, he was released early, on the 12 September 1945, on the condition that he work full time in a hospital. While in prison he wrote Ill-Health, Poverty and the State, in which he argued that the welfare state fails to address the underlying causes of poverty and poor health, namely capitalism and the state itself.

== General practice ==
In 1947 Hewetson went into general practice. In the 1950s he advocated freely available birth control and safe abortions. (Note: Ward in Ward & Goodway 2014, p. 36.) He worked to make contraceptives freely available for working-class women to enable them to have freer sex lives. He also helped to supply birth control materials into France where they were illegal. He regularly referred women to an illegal specialist for abortions. Initially he undertook this work alone. However, over time he formed a group practice. In 1951 he authored Sexual Freedom for the Young: Society and the Sexual Life of Children and Adolescents which drew on the work of Bronisław Malinowski and Wilhelm Reich.

== Later life ==
Alongside being a GP, Hewetson was a visiting medical officer of the Camberwell Reception Centre (also known as the Spike) from 1951 until his retirement in 1983. Hewetson died on the 20 December 1990 in Surrey.

== Retrospective ==
Smith, Dorling and Shaw (2016) described Hewetson as follows:

'John Hewetson was a medical practitioner who hailed from a wealthy background but spent his life working with patients in poor areas. He was a spirited character who in the 1930s did his rounds in a white Rolls Royce, but also attended anarchist meetings. In the 1940s he was jailed twice, once as a conscientious objector and then a second time as a ‘disaffecter of the Forces’.

In the 1950s he spent much time working for freely available birth control and abortion, and made particular efforts to make contraceptives available to working-class women so that they could enjoy their sex....'

== Publications ==
=== Articles ===
- "British political police at work" (PDF). War Commentary. 6 (14): 4. 1945.
- "Mat Kavanash—70 and Gom: Strong !". Freedom. 7 (11). 1946.
- "Mutual aid and social evolution: Mutual aid and the social significance of Darwinism. Freedom Press". Anarchy. 55 (September): 257-270. 1965.
- "Mat Kavanagh: A Tribute". Freedom. 20 March 1954.

=== Chapter ===
- Woodcock, George, ed. (1948). "Dormant seeds of 1848". A hundred years of revolution. London: The Porcupine Press. (Note: Reproduced as a pamphlet here.)

=== Pamphlets ===
- Italy after Mussolini. London: Freedom Press. 1945. (Note: In their review, G. (1946) opined: 'To the ordinary seeker after knowledge, ... who is not looking for revolutions and counter-revolutions behind every bush, [Hewetson] merely appears to have marred an otherwise able and workmanlike production by periodical pieces of wilful distortion.' (G. 1946).)
- Sexual Freedom for the Young. Society and the sexual life of children and adolescents. London: Freedom Press. 1951.

=== Book ===
- Illhealth, poverty and the state. London: Freedom Press. 1946.

== Archives ==
- Bishopsgate Institute Freedom Press Library
- Freedom Defence Committee
- Freedom Defence Committee, Jul 1945 - July 1946
- Freedom Press Newspaper Archive
- War Commentary (1939-1945)
