= Israel Narodiczky =

Israel Narodiczky (4 October 1874, Zhitomir-4 October 1942 London) was a prominent Yiddish bookseller, publisher and printer active in the East End of London in the first half of the twentieth century. He had a traditional Rabbinic education at the Volozhin Yeshiva, but also became a skilled typesetter before leaving Imperial Russia to settle in London in 1896. Here he established a family bookselling and printing business in Whitechapel, printing a range of Zionist, socialist and anarchist publications. He also used the imprint Narod Press. This brought him in to contact with a broad range of writers and political activists. After his death in 1942, both Narod Press and the printing business was run by one of his sons.

== Early life in Imperial Russia ==
Along with Vilnius located to the north in Lithuania, Zhitomir was created by the Imperial authorities as a centre for Jewish life to the south in Ukraine. by the mid nineteenth century it had become a major centre of Jewish printing in both Hebrew and Yiddish. Both Narodiczky and the poet Hayim Nahman Bialik attended the Volozhin Yeshiva in Vilnius from 1888 until his closure in 1891 following the implementation of imperial regulation. Around that time, Narodicsky sent a copy of Bialik's first poem, "El ha-Tzippor", to Yehoshua Hana Rawnitzki, editor of Pardes, where it was published in 1892.
