= Spain and the World =

Anti-fascist journal

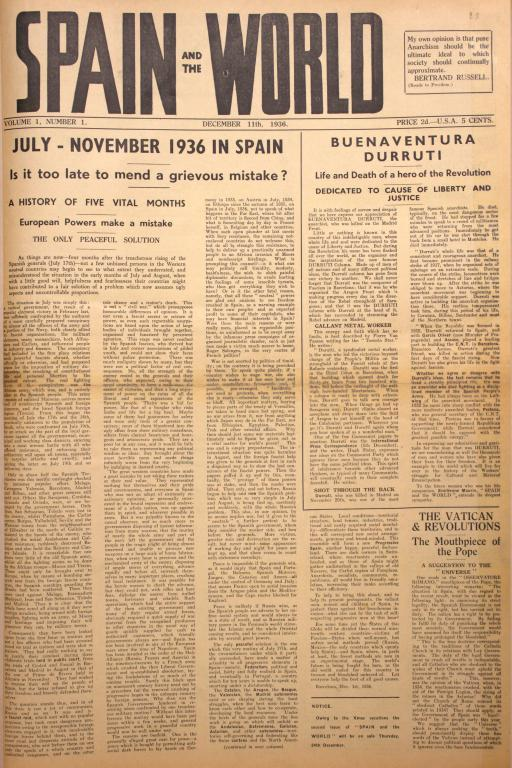
- Front page on December 11th 1936
- Type: Fortnightly journal
- Founded: 11 December 1936
- Ceased publication: 23 December 1938
- Political alignment: Anti-fascist
- Headquarters: Clerkenwell
- City: London
- Country: United Kingdom

Spain and the World was a fortnightly anti-fascist journal that was launched in London in December 1936 by Francesco Galasso, an Italian physician, and Vernon Richards (originally Vero Benvenuto Costantino Recchioni), a student. Galasso and Richards launched the journal to counteract the political biases of the News Chronicle and the New Statesman, both of which supported Soviet policy during the Spanish Civil War.

The local background for the launch of Spain and the World was a diaspora of Italian anti-fascists in London in which Galasso was prominent. He had welcomed Emma Goldman, who was a friend of Enrico Malatesta, into his house and had edited Il Comento (1922–1924), a weekly satirical magazine which 'was one of the few explicitly anti-Fascist periodicals in London'. The group used to meet up with other anti-fascist Italians in and outside London at the delicatessen of Emilio Recchioni, the satirically named King Bomba, in Old Compton Street, Soho. Recchioni was an anarchist friend of Malatesta and Richards' father.

Spain and the World had a forerunner – a 32-page pamphlet on Spain, The struggle for liberty in Spain 1840–1936, that was published by the Narod Press in Whitechapel, in East London, which was run by Israel Narodiczky with his three sons. Spain and the World followed it in 1936 with Richards as the editor. In the following year, he was joined by Marie Louise Berneri from France, who became "heavily involved in working for the paper, rapidly learning English to add to her native Italian and acquired French and Spanish." (Note: Goodway (2012) observed that Berneri and Richards "were at the centre of the new group of energetic young anarchists which ... emerged around Spain and the World ...." (Goodway 2012, p. 126).) Thereafter the first twelve issues were printed by V.W.H. Printers Ltd, which printed a number of provincial weeklies in Faringdon (then in Berkshire).

The proprietor of V.W.H. Printers Ltd was Robert Henriques, a much-decorated soldier who was later to become Colonel R.D.Q. Henriques, and a successful author, novelist and biographer. R (1986) recounted that for the first issue Henriques personally took the galley proofs to the editor's home, where he pasted them up, after which he felt that he should past them up.

V.W.H. Printers Ltd had a London office in 207 Goswell Road, which served two essential functions. It served as the journal's temporary mailing address, from which members of the public could buy copies of The struggle for liberty in Spain 1840–1936. And it served as a collection point for donations to the Spanish Medical Aid Unit, which was run by the Spanish Medical Aid Committee. (Note: For a contemporaneous account, see Jeger & Peacock 1937. For retrospective accounts, see Fryth 1976 and Buchanan 2024.)

Spain and the World was printed by three firms: V.W.H. Printers Ltd, Narod Press, with which it had an on-off relationship, and Wyndham Printers, which was in Hackney, East London. R (1990) observed: "Forty seven issues of Spain and the World were published between December 11th 1936 and December 23rd 1938. A 4-page supplement to Number 14 was issued on June 13th 1937 in Barcelona. A 'Special No-War' supplement to Number 34 for May 1938 was issued in a 10,000 copy edition." Copies of the journal have been archived. (Note: Spain and the World newspaper.)

In 1939, after the victory of the nationalists in the Spanish Civil War, for six issues Spain and the World was renamed Revolt! Incorporating Spain and the World. (Note: Several issues of Revolt! Incorporating Spain and the World are available online, for example Revolt! Incorporating Spain and the World. Vol III. No.1. (48) 11th February 1939.pdf and Revolt! Spain and the World. Vol. III. No. 2 (1949). 25th February 1939.) Then Revolt! Incorporating Spain and the World was renamed War Commentary.
