= Vernon Richards =

Anglo-Italian anarchist writer (1915–2001)

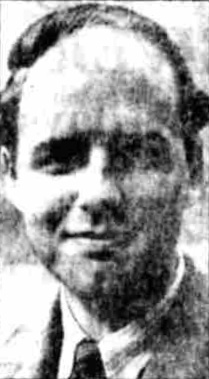
- Born: Vero Benvenuto Costantino Recchioni; 19 July 1915; Soho, London, England
- Died: 10 December 2001 (aged 86); Hadleigh, Suffolk, England
- Education: Emanuel School, Wandsworth; King's College London
- Occupations: Writer; Newspaper editor; Photographer
- Movement: Anarchism
- Spouse: Marie-Louise Berneri (m. 1937; died 1949)
- Partner: Peta Hewetson (d.1997)
- Father: Emidio Recchioni

Vernon Richards (born Vero Benvenuto Costantino Recchioni, 19 July 1915 – 10 December 2001) was an Anglo-Italian anarchist, editor, author, engineer, photographer and the companion of Marie-Louise Berneri.

Richards' founding of the paper Spain and the World in 1936 lead to the revival of the British anarchist publisher Freedom Press and the subsequent publishing of the newspaper War Commentary, followed in 1945 by the relaunch of Freedom newspaper.

Richards and Berneri were joined in Freedom Press by a group of regular contributors, including John Hewetson, Tony Gibson, Philip Sansom, George Woodcock and Colin Ward. Freedom remained under Richards' editorship until 1968 and he retained a strong influence over Freedom Press until his retirement. He also authored and translated a number of books including Lessons of the Spanish Revolution (1953) and Errico Malatesta: His Life & Ideas (1965).

== Biography ==
Richards was born in 1915 in Soho, London to the Italian militant anarchist railway worker Emidio Recchioni and his wife Costanza (née Benericetti) where they ran a popular delicatessen, King Bomba. Emidio had fled Italy following a prison escape with Errico Malatesta. Friends speculated that Richards had inherited his single-mindedness from his father though Richards later described his father as a "bourgeois terrorist".

Richards was educated at Emanuel School in Wandsworth and studied civil engineering at King's College London. He then worked as a railway engineer.

In 1931 in Paris, Richards met Marie Louise Berneri, daughter of Camillo and Giovanna Berneri, and began a long-distance relationship. Richards and Camillo together edited the bilingual Italian and English anti-Mussolini paper Italia Libera/Free Italy, resulting in Richards' deportation from France in 1935.

In 1935, he anglicised his name from Vero Recchioni to Vernon Richards. From December 1936 Richards began work on a new anarchist newspaper in London, Spain and the World, reporting on the Spanish Civil War. In 1937 Marie moved to London to join him, marrying him in October 1937 so she could gain British citizenship.

After the first issue of Spain and the World, the paper was taken on by Freedom Press with Richards' as editor, going on to play a leading role in the revival of British anarchism and Freedom Press.

Following the fascist victory in the Spanish Civil War, Spain and the World was briefly relaunched as Revolt! In November 1939, with the onset of war, the paper was renamed again as War Commentary.

On 26 April 1945, as an editor of War Commentary, Richards was sentenced to nine months in prison along with two contributors, John Hewetson and Philip Sansom, for conspiring to cause disaffection among members of the armed forces under Defence Regulation 39a. The same charges against Berneri were dropped, as legally, a wife could not be prosecuted for conspiring with her husband about which she was reportedly furious. Coming at the end of the war, the four day trial at the Old Bailey saw significant press coverage and public controversy. The arrests led to the formation of the prominent Freedom Defence Committee. The trial also saw an end to Richard's career as an engineer, with Richards' and Berneri deciding to try and earn a living as professional photographers.

After Richards's release from prison, their friend George Orwell, who was extremely averse to being photographed, allowed Richards and Berneri to photograph him to help them start out. The photos feature a relaxed Orwell at home and in the street and remain in widespread use. The complete set was published in the 1998 book George Orwell at Home (and Among the Anarchists): Essays and Photographs.

At this time, a split had formed within Freedom Press between anarcho-syndicalists with ties to the Confederación Nacional del Trabajo (CNT) and anarcho-communists associated with Richards and Berneri, who aligned more with Errico Malatesta's critique of revolutionary trade unionism. The split saw the painter and War Commentary contributor Cliff Holden hold Richards at gunpoint to extract money for a new paper. Richards' views on the Spanish Civil War, including critiques of the CNT from Freedom and Spain and the World were later republished in the book Lessons of the Spanish Revolution.

In December 1948, Berneri gave birth, but the child died shortly afterwards. She then died of a viral infection from childbirth in April 1949.

In the 1950s Richards sold the family store, King Bomba, and in 1968 with his partner Peta Hewetson, he moved to Suffolk where he grew and sold vegetables from a smallholding. He also worked as a travel agent, including trips to Francoist Spain and the Soviet Union.

Richards formally retired from Freedom Press in 1995. A workaholic, he continued to write books into his eighties, though following Peta Hewetson's death in 1997 he became more reclusive. He died on 10 December 2001 in Hadleigh, Suffolk.

In a Guardian obituary Colin Ward, who had worked with Richards for decades, described him as a "ruthless exploiter of others" and a "manipulator" with a noted tendency to lose friends. Richard's papers are held by the International Institute of Social History in Amsterdam.

== Publications ==
- Lessons of the Spanish Revolution (1953)
- Errico Malatesta: His Life & Ideas (1965)
- The Impossibilities of Social Democracy (1978)
- Protest without Illusions (1981)
- Violence and Anarchism: A Polemic (1983)
- Why Work? Arguments for the Leisure Society (1983)
- A Weekend Photographer's Notebook (1996)
- George Orwell at Home (and Among the Anarchists). Essays and Photographs (1998)
- A Part-Time Photographers Portrait Gallery (1999)
- Beauty Is More Than 'In the Eye of the Beholder': Photographs of Women and Children (1999)
