= Herbert Read =

English anarchist and writer (1893–1968)

Sir Herbert Read DSO MC
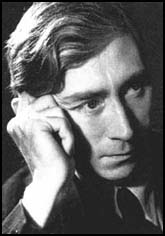
- Born: Herbert Edward Read; 4 December 1893; Muscoates, North Riding of Yorkshire, England
- Died: 12 June 1968 (aged 74); Stonegrave, North Riding of Yorkshire, England
- Occupations: Art historian, literary and art critic
- Writing career
- Period: 1915–1968

Sir Herbert Edward Read, DSO, MC (/riːd/; 4 December 1893 – 12 June 1968) was an English art historian, poet, literary critic and philosopher, best known for numerous books on art, which included influential volumes on the role of art in education. Read was co-founder of the Institute of Contemporary Arts. As well as being a prominent English anarchist, he was one of the earliest English writers to take notice of existentialism. He was co-editor with Michael Fordham and Gerhard Adler of the British edition in English of The Collected Works of C. G. Jung.

He was a professor of fine art at Edinburgh University from 1931 to 1933, a lecturer in art at the University of Liverpool (1935-36), Leon Fellow at University of London (1940-42), and Charles Eliot Norton Professor of Poetry at Harvard University (1953-54).

== Early life ==
The eldest of four children of tenant farmer Herbert Edward Read (1868–1903) and his wife Eliza Strickland, Read was born at Muscoates Grange, near Nunnington, about four miles south of Kirkbymoorside in the North Riding of Yorkshire. In Herbert Read- The Stream and the Source (1972), George Woodcock wrote: "rural memories are long... nearly sixty years after Read's father... had died and the family had left Muscoates, I heard it said that 'the Reads were snobs'. They employed a governess (and) rode to hounds..." After his father's death, the family, being tenants rather than owners, had to leave the farm; Read was sent to a school for orphans at Halifax, West Yorkshire, and his mother took a job managing laundry in Leeds, where Read later joined her. Read's studies at the University of Leeds were interrupted by the outbreak of the First World War, during which he served with the Green Howards in France. He was commissioned in January 1915, and received both the Military Cross (MC) and the Distinguished Service Order (DSO) "for conspicuous gallantry and devotion to duty" in 1918. He reached the rank of captain.

During the war, Read founded the journal Arts & Letters with Frank Rutter, one of the first literary periodicals to publish work by T. S. Eliot.

== Early work ==
Read's first volume of poetry was Songs of Chaos, self-published in 1915. His second collection, published in 1919, was called Naked Warriors, and drew on his experiences fighting in the trenches of the First World War. His work, which shows the influence of Imagism and the Metaphysical poets, was mainly in free verse. His Collected Poems appeared in 1946. As a critic of literature, Read mainly concerned himself with the English Romantic poets (for example, The True Voice of Feeling: Studies in English Romantic Poetry, 1953) but was also a close observer of imagism. He published a novel, The Green Child. He contributed to the Criterion (1922–39) and he was for many years a regular art critic for The Listener.

While W. B. Yeats chose many poets of the Great War generation for The Oxford Book of Modern Verse (1936), Read arguably stood out among his peers by virtue of the 17-page excerpt (nearly half of the entire work) of his The End of a War (Faber & Faber, 1933).

Read was also interested in the art of writing. He cared deeply about style and structure and summarised his views in English Prose Style (1928), a primer on, and a philosophy of, good writing. The book is considered one of the best on the foundations of the English language, and how those foundations can be and have been used to write English with elegance and distinction.

== Art criticism ==
Read was a champion of modern British artists such as Paul Nash, Ben Nicholson, Henry Moore and Barbara Hepworth. He became associated with Nash's contemporary arts group Unit One. Read was professor of fine arts at the University of Edinburgh (1931–33) and editor of The Burlington Magazine (1933–38). He was one of the organisers of the London International Surrealist Exhibition in 1936 and editor of the book Surrealism, published in 1936, which included contributions from André Breton, Hugh Sykes Davies, Paul Éluard, and Georges Hugnet. He also served as a trustee of the Tate Gallery and as a curator at the Victoria & Albert Museum (1922–31), as well as co-founding the Institute of Contemporary Arts with Roland Penrose in 1947. He was one of the earliest English writers to take notice of existentialism, and was strongly influenced by proto-existentialist thinker Max Stirner, one of the forerunners of nihilism, psychoanalytic theory, postmodernism, individualist anarchism, and egoism.

From 1953 to 1954 Read served as the Norton Professor at Harvard University. In that final year, he gave the A. W. Mellon Lectures in the Fine Arts at the National Gallery of Art. For the academic year 1964–65 and again in 1965, he was a Fellow on the faculty at the Center for Advanced Studies of Wesleyan University.

== Poetry ==
Read's conception of poetry was influenced by his mentors T. E. Hulme, F. S. Flint, Marianne Moore and W. C. Williams, believing "true poetry was never speech but always a song", quoted with the rest of his definition 'What is a Poem' in his 1926 essay of that name (in his endword to his Collected Poems of 1966).

Read's Phases of English Poetry was an evolutionary study seeking to answer metaphysical rather than pragmatic questions.

Read's definitive guide to poetry however, was his Form in Modern Poetry, which he published in 1932. In 1951, literary critic A. S. Collins said of Read: "In his poetry he burnt the white ecstasy of intellect, terse poetry of austere beauty retaining much of his earliest Imagist style." This style was evident in Read's earliest collection, Eclogues 1914-18.

== Anarchism and philosophical outlook ==
Politically, Read considered himself an anarchist, albeit in the English quietist tradition of Edward Carpenter and William Morris. Nevertheless, in the 1953 New Year Honours he accepted a knighthood for "services to literature"; this caused Read to be ostracized by most of the anarchist movement. Read was actively opposed to the Franco regime in Spain, and often campaigned on behalf of political prisoners in Spain. He was the chairman of the Freedom Defence Committee founded in 1945. In 1964 Read joined the Who Killed Kennedy? Committee set up by Bertrand Russell.

Dividing Read's writings on politics from those on art and culture is difficult, because he saw art, culture and politics as a single congruent expression of human consciousness. His total work amounts to over 1,000 published titles.

Read's book To Hell With Culture deals specifically with his disdain for the term culture and expands on his anarchist view of the artist as artisan, as well as presenting a major analysis of the work of Eric Gill. It was republished by Routledge in 2002.

In his philosophical outlook, Read was close to the European idealist traditions represented by Friedrich Schelling, Johann Gottlieb Fichte, and Samuel Taylor Coleridge, believing that reality as it is experienced by the human mind was as much a product of the human mind as any external or objective actuality. In other words, the mind is not a camera recording the reality it perceives through the eyes; it is also a projector throwing out its own reality. This meant that art was not, as many Marxists believed, simply a product of a bourgeois society, but a psychological process that had evolved simultaneously with the evolution of consciousness. Art was, therefore, a biological phenomenon, a view that frequently pitted Read against Marxist critics such as Anthony Blunt in the 1930s. Read, in this respect, was influenced by developments in German art psychology. His Idealist background also led Read towards an interest in psychoanalysis. Read became a pioneer in the English-speaking world in the use of psychoanalysis as a tool for art and literary criticism. Originally a Freudian, Read came to transfer his allegiance to the analytical psychology of Carl Jung, eventually becoming both publisher and editor-in-chief of Jung's collected works in English.

As early as 1949, Read took an interest in the writings of the French Existentialists, particularly those of Jean-Paul Sartre. Although Read never described himself as an existentialist, he did acknowledge that his theories often found support among those who did. Read perhaps was the closest England came to an existentialist theorist of the European tradition.

== Views on education ==
Read developed a strong interest in the subject of education and particularly in art education. Read's anarchism was influenced by William Godwin, Peter Kropotkin and Max Stirner. Read "became deeply interested in children's drawings and paintings after having been invited to collect works for an exhibition of British art that would tour allied and neutral countries during the Second World War. As it was considered too risky to transport across the Atlantic works of established importance to the national heritage, it was proposed that children’s drawings and paintings should be sent instead. Read, in making his collection, was unexpectedly moved by the expressive power and emotional content of some of the younger artists' works. The experience prompted his special attention to their cultural value, and his engagement of the theory of children's creativity with seriousness matching his devotion to the avant-garde. This work both changed fundamentally his own life's work throughout his remaining 25 years and provided art education with a rationale of unprecedented lucidity and persuasiveness. Key books and pamphlets resulted: Education through Art (Read, 1943); The Education of Free Men (Read, 1944); Culture and Education in a World Order (Read, 1948); The Grass Read, (1955); and Redemption of the Robot (1966).

== Death and legacy ==
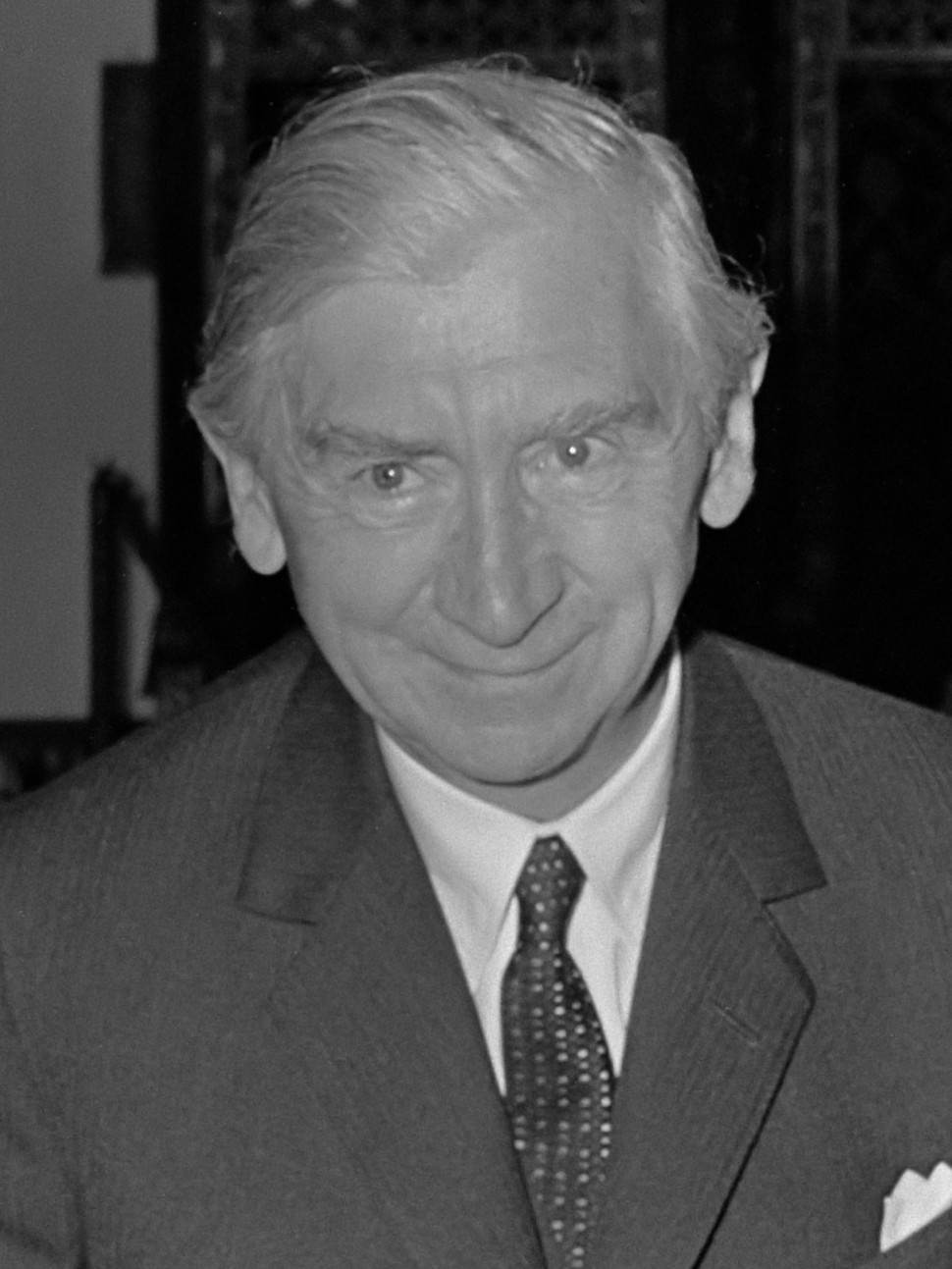
Herbert Read in 1966

Following his death in 1968, Read was probably neglected due to the increasing predominance in academia of theories of art, including Marxism, which discounted his ideas. Yet his work continued to have influence. It was through Read's writings on anarchism that Murray Bookchin was inspired in the mid-1960s to explore the connections between anarchism and ecology. In 1971, a collection of his writings on anarchism and politics was republished, Anarchy and Order, with an introduction by Howard Zinn. In the 1990s, there was a revival of interest in him following a major exhibition in 1993 at Leeds City Art Gallery and the publication of a collection of his anarchist writings, A One-Man Manifesto and other writings for Freedom Press, edited by David Goodway. Since then, more of his work has been republished and there was a Herbert Read Conference, at Tate Britain in June 2004. The library at the Cyprus College of Art is named after him, as is the art gallery at the University for the Creative Arts at Canterbury. Until the 1990s the Institute of Contemporary Arts in London staged an annual Herbert Read Lecture, which included well-known speakers such as Salman Rushdie.

On 11 November 1985, Read was among 16 Great War poets commemorated on a slate stone unveiled in Westminster Abbey's Poet's Corner. The inscription on the stone was taken from Wilfred Owen's "Preface" to his poems and reads: "My subject is War, and the pity of War. The Poetry is in the pity."

A 1937 reading by Read lasting seven minutes and titled The Surrealist Object can be heard on the audiobook CD Surrealism Reviewed, published in 2002.

He was the father of the well-known writer Piers Paul Read, the BBC documentary maker John Read, the BBC producer and executive Tom Read, and the art historian Ben Read.

== Selected works ==
- Ecologue: A Book of Poems (1919)
- Naked Warriors (1919)
- What is a Poem (1926)
- English Prose Style (1928)
- Phases of English Poetry (1928)
- Wordsworth; The Clark Lectures 1929-30 (1930)
- In Retreat (1930)
- Ambush (1931)
- Arp (1931) 'the World of Art Library' series
- The Meaning of Art (1931) revised 1968
- Art and Alienation (1932)
- Form in Modern Poetry (1932)
- Innocent Eye (1933) childhood autobiography
- The Redemption of the Robot: My Encounter with Education through Art (1933)
- Art Now (1933)
- Art and Industry (1934)
- My Anarchism (1934)
- The Green Child (1935)
- Unit One (1935) editor
- Paul Nash. A Portfolio of Colour Plates (1937) introduction
- Eric Gill (1938)
- Introduction to Hubris: A Study of Pride by Pierre Stephen Robert Payne (1940)
- The Tenth Muse (1941)
- To Hell With Culture (1941)
- A World Within A War (1943)
- Education Through Art (1943) later revised
- Icon and Idea (1943)
- Revolution & Reason (1945)
- The Art of Sculpture (1949)
- Education for Peace (1950)
- Existentialism, Marxism and Anarchism, Chains of Freedom (1951)
- English Prose Style (Reprinted 1952)
- Art and Society (1953)
- The True Voice of Feeling (1953)
- The Paradox of Anarchism (1955)
- Philosophy of Anarchism (1957)
- A Concise History of Modern Painting (1959) 'the World of Art Library' series
- Anarchy & Order; Poetry & Anarchism (1959)
- Collected Essays in Literary Criticism (1960)
- The Grass Roots of Art (1963)
- Art Now (1963)
- The Contrary Experience: Autobiographies (1963) autobiography
- A Concise History of Modern Sculpture (1964) 'the World of Art Library' series
- Collected Poems (1966)
- Wordsworth (1966)
- Naked Warriors (Reprinted 1967)
- Art and Alienation (1967)
- Essays in Literary Criticism (1969)
