= Manifesto of the Thirty-Five =

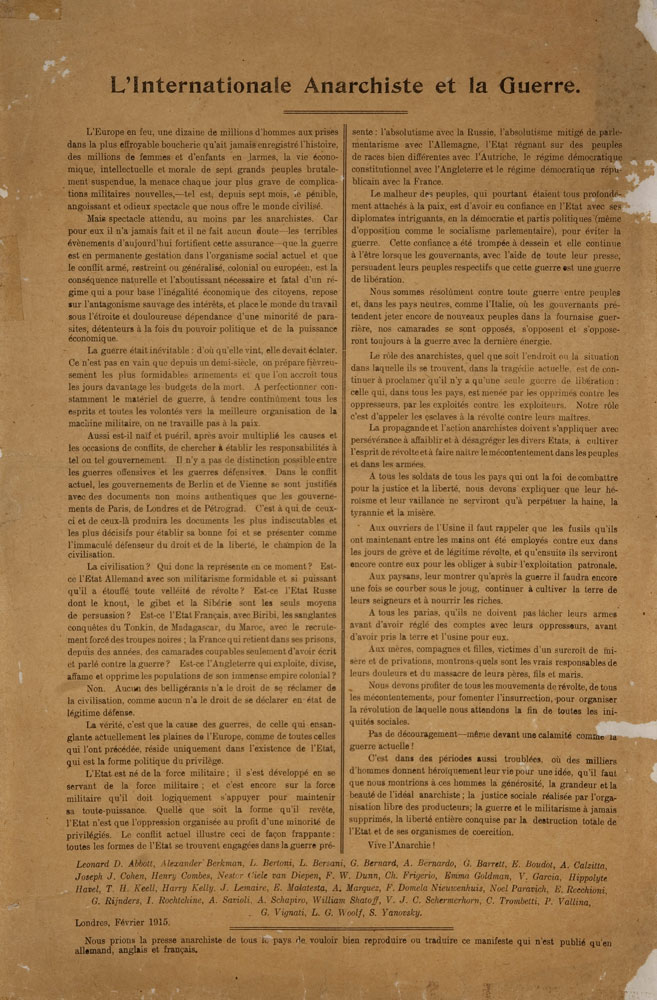
- Manifesto of the Thirty-Five in French
- Created: February 1915
- Author: Errico Malatesta
- Signatories: Leonard Abbott, Alexander Berkman, Luigi Bertoni, George Ballard, A. Bernardo, Édouard Boudot, A. Calzitta, Henry Combes, Ferdinand Domela Nieuwenhuis, Fred William Dunn, Carlo Frigerio, Emma Goldman, Vicente Garcia, Georges Bernard, Hippolyte Havel, Thomas Keell, Harry Kelly, Jules Lemaire, A. Marquez, Errico Malatesta, Noël Paravich, Iuda Roshchin, Emidio Recchioni, Gerhard Rijnders, V. J. C. Schermerhorn, Alexander Schapiro, William Shatoff, A. Savioli, C. Trombetti, Pedro Vallina Martinez, Giuseppe Vignati, Lilian Wolfe, and Saul Yanovsky
- Subject: Anarchism; Antimilitarism

Full text
- Manifesto of the Thirty-Five at Wikisource

The Manifesto of the Thirty-Five, originally titled The Anarchist International and the War, was an anarchist manifesto published in February 1915 in London. The text opposed the participation of anarchists in World War I and their support for any state-led war—a position that had been defended at the time by figure such as Peter Kropotkin.

Written and conceived by Errico Malatesta, the document was signed by thirty-six prominent anarchist figures, including Emma Goldman, Alexander Berkman, and Luigi Bertoni. In it, Malatesta criticized the stance of anarchists who supported a war that was neither anti-colonial, nor a war of liberation, nor a revolution, but rather a conflict between capitalist powers against which anarchists ought to have fought.

The text was part of the intense debates on the issue within anarchist circles, and while the positions it defended are now generally shared by more recent anarchists, it provoked a major conflict in 1915. This led Kropotkin to respond with the Manifesto of the Sixteen, in which he called for support of the Triple Entente. Although Kropotkin and Malatesta remained friends later on, this episode deeply distanced them, with Malatesta holding Kropotkin responsible for the arrest of Rudolf Rocker by the British authorities.

== History ==
=== Context ===
In the 19th century, anarchism emerged and took shape in Europe before spreading. Anarchists advocated a struggle against all forms of domination perceived as unjust including economic domination brought forth by capitalism. They were particularly opposed to the State, seen as the organization that legitimized these dominations through its police, army and propaganda.

On the eve of World War I, anarchists had already formed a movement present across a significant portion of the globe. Their flight, exile, and high mobility during the period of propaganda by the deed (1880–1914) and anarcho-syndicalism had reinforced their presence in many parts of the world. These dynamics were further supported by the fact that anarchists showed interest in anticolonial struggles earlier than their Marxist counterparts, who were then focused on the European industrial proletariat and largely indifferent to anticolonialism. They reached the peak of their influence on the global left around this time: in 1905, a revolution nearly overthrew the Tsar; in 1909, they played a central role during the Tragic Week in Barcelona. Numerous strikes and anarchist actions affected several countries, particularly in Latin America, and partly triggered the Mexican Revolution (1910–1920). The global left was so influenced that even the Marxists—who had expelled anarchists like Errico Malatesta from the Second International in 1896 on the grounds that he defended anti-parliamentarianism—ended up adopting these same positions.

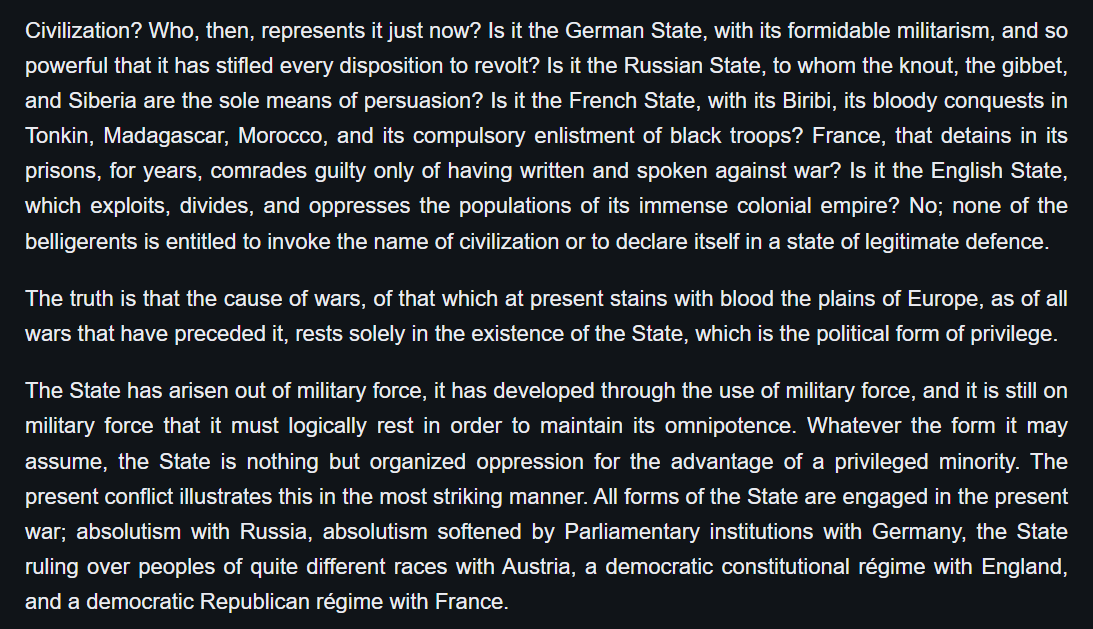
Part of the Manifesto of the Thirty-Five (February–March 1915)

After the declaration of war, Malatesta, who maintained a pacifist stance, was abandoned by a number of fellow anarchists. In France, many—such as Charles Malato or Jean Grave—supported the Sacred Union, the political truce amongst all parties to conduct the war. Max Nettlau supported Austria-Hungary in its struggle against the "Slavs". Among Italian anarchists, figures like Silvio Corio and Benito Mussolini also embraced belligerent or nationalist views. In Belgium, Jacques Mesnil defended the Triple Entente, arguing that the end of British liberalism would compromise London as a place of refuge for anarchists. Finally, Peter Kropotkin, one of anarchism's major thinkers, openly supported pro-French and pro-Russian positions in the war, speaking and writing frequently in defense of France and Russia against Germany. German anarchists in England, such as Rudolf Rocker, were quickly arrested in London by British police for opposing the war—something Malatesta blamed on Kropotkin and his abandonment of anarchist principles, and for which he would never forgive him.

Malatesta had noticed these Francophile and nationalist tendencies in his friend well before the war, but the conflict provoked a rupture. Ill during the first months of the war, he began a broad campaign aimed at denouncing the positions of anarchists who supported participation in the conflict. He wrote about Kropotkin in Freedom in December 1914:

I confess that we were in the wrong not giving importance to his Franco-Russian patriotism, and not foreseeing where his anti-German prejudices would land him.

Later, before his death, Malatesta repeated this assessment of his friend, believing that such nationalism was insurmountable and pathological in him. He wrote that this episode was one of the :

most tragic events of my life (and I dare say one of his) in which after a decidedly painful discussion, we separated as adversaries, almost enemies.

In any case, this division between two major figures of anarchism provoked serious questions about the war and about whether or not anarchists should participate in it. In order to counter his comrade's positions, Malatesta began by publishing articles in which he argued that anarchists who supported the war were abandoning the core principles of anarchism. In these articles, he predicted that the war would be long, deadly, aimless, and would only lead to an even more violent second war. At the beginning of 1915, he joined forces with a number of notable anarchists—such as Emma Goldman, Alexander Berkman, and Luigi Bertoni—to gain their support in this ideological struggle against Kropotkin, a debate that touched on the very foundations of anarchist thought.

=== Manifesto ===
In this context, thirty-six figures of the anarchist movement joined Malatesta and published a manifesto under the title The Anarchist International and the War. The signatories, listed in alphabetical order followed by the manifesto, were:

Leonard Abbott, Alexander Berkman, Luigi Bertoni, George Ballard, A. Bernardo, Édouard Boudot, A. Calzitta, Henry Combes, Ferdinand Domela Nieuwenhuis, Fred William Dunn, Carlo Frigerio, Emma Goldman, Vicente Garcia, Georges Bernard, Hippolyte Havel, Thomas Keell, Harry Kelly, Jules Lemaire, A. Marquez, Errico Malatesta, Noël Paravich, Iuda Roshchin, Emidio Recchioni, Gerhard Rijnders, V. J. C. Schermerhorn, Alexander Schapiro, William Shatoff, A. Savioli, C. Trombetti, Pedro Vallina Martinez, Giuseppe Vignati, Lilian Wolfe, and Saul Yanovsky.

Rudolf Rocker wished to sign the document but was unable to do so, as he was in prison at the time of its drafting and signing. The text opposed war and instead advocated pacifism. For the anarchists who signed it, a war waged between two states—such as France and Germany in this case—was neither to be supported nor undertaken, since governments sought only to divide workers and support the bourgeoisie. This view, mainly advanced by Malatesta at the time, was based on several arguments that he also developed elsewhere. For him, while certain wars—such as anti-colonial liberation struggles or necessarily violent revolutions—could be justified, a war waged between two capitalist and colonial powers should not be supported by anarchists. At best, they ought to fight against it; at worst, abstain from it—but certainly not support it, as that would mean becoming complicit in state and capitalist crimes. Against the argument that the German political system was worse than that of liberal powers such as France or England—and that one should therefore fight to preserve the latter—Malatesta countered that such reasoning created a hierarchy between the struggles of German and British or French proletariats. For him, both were equally legitimate in revolting and striving for the advent of anarchy.

=== Legacy ===
The positions expressed in this text, also known as the Manifesto of the Thirty-Five, led Kropotkin to respond the following year with the Manifesto of the Sixteen, once again calling for support of the Triple Entente. This resulted in a significant rupture within anarchist circles, at least in Europe. The anarchist movement was deeply affected by this division and by the war more broadly, and it only began to rebuild with the Russian Revolution and the Makhnovshchina, which ushered the movement into new perspectives. The antimilitarism advocated by Malatesta at the time gradually became the dominant position within the anarchist movement—though this debate was still ongoing at the time.

== Bibliography ==
- Adams, Matthew S.; Kinna, Ruth (2017). Anarchism, 1914–18 : Internationalism, Anti-militarism and War. Manchester: Manchester University Press (MUP). ISBN 978-1-5261-1576-8.
- Alloul, Houssine; Eldem, Edhem; de Smaele, Henk, eds. (2018). To Kill a Sultan: A Transnational History of the Attempt on Abdülhamid II. Palgrave Macmillan UK. ISBN 978-1-137-48931-9.
  - Van Ginderachter, Martin. "Edward Joris: Caught Between Continents and Ideologies?". In Alloul, Eldem & de Smaele (2018), pp. 67–99.
- Guérin, Daniel (2012). Malatesta, l'Internationale anarchiste et la guerre (in French). Paris: La Découverte. doi:10.3917/dec.gueri.2012.01. ISBN 978-2-7071-6690-6.
- Jourdain, Edouard (2013). L'anarchisme [Anarchism] (in French). Paris: La Découverte. ISBN 978-2-7071-9091-8.
- Jourdain, Édouard (2023). Géopolitique de l'anarchisme : Vers un nouveau moment libertaire (in French). Paris: La Découverte. ISBN 9791031805856.
- Ward, Colin (2004). Anarchism: A Very Short Introduction. Oxford University Press (OUP).
