= Piermaria =

Piermaria is a masculine Italian given name. Notable people with the name include:

- Piermaria Bagnadore (c. 1550–1627), Italian painter and architect
- Piermaria Porettano, Italian Baroque painter
- Piermaria Oddone (born 1944), American physicist
- Piermaria Siciliano (born 1974), Italian swimmer
