= Manifesto of the Sixteen =

1916 document by Peter Kropotkin and Jean Grave

- Created: 1916
- Authors: Jean Grave; Peter Kropotkin
- Signatories: see below
- Purpose: To promote anarchist support for the victory of the Allied Powers over the Central Powers during the First World War.

The Manifesto of the Sixteen (French: Manifeste des seize), or Proclamation of the Sixteen, was a document drafted in 1916 by eminent anarchists Peter Kropotkin and Jean Grave which advocated an Allied victory over Germany and the Central Powers during the First World War. At the outbreak of the war, Kropotkin and other anarchist supporters of the Allied cause advocated their position in the pages of the Freedom newspaper, provoking sharply critical responses. As the war continued, anarchists across Europe campaigned in anti-war movements and wrote denunciations of the war in pamphlets and statements, including the Manifesto of the Thirty-Five signed or supported by prominent anarchists such as Errico Malatesta, Emma Goldman and Rudolf Rocker.

At this time, Kropotkin was in frequent correspondence with those who shared his position, and was convinced by one of their number, Jean Grave, to draft a document encouraging anarchist support for the Allies. The resulting manifesto was published in the pages of the pro-war socialist periodical La Bataille on March 14, 1916, and republished in other European anarchist periodicals shortly thereafter. The manifesto declared that supporting the war was an act of resistance against the aggression of the German Empire, and that the war had to be pursued until its defeat. At this point, the authors conjectured, the ruling political parties of Germany would be overthrown and the anarchist goal of the emancipation of Europe and of the German people would be advanced.

Contrary to its misleading title, the Manifesto of the Sixteen had originally fifteen signatories—among them some of the most eminent anarchists in Europe—and was later countersigned by another hundred. The position of the Manifesto was in stark contrast to that of most anarchists of the day, many of whom denounced its signatories and their sympathizers, and accused them of betraying anarchist principles. In the fallout over the war, Kropotkin became increasingly isolated, with many former friends cutting their ties to him. The Russian anarchist movement was split into two, with a faction supporting Kropotkin's position to the strong criticism of the Bolsheviks. Elsewhere, the Spanish and Swiss anarchist movements dismissed the Manifesto and marginalized its supporters.

== Background ==
=== Kropotkin's anti-German stance ===
Anti-German sentiment was a strong current in progressive and revolutionary movements in Russia from their early beginnings, due to German influence on the aristocracy of the ruling Romanov dynasty. Historian George Woodcock contended that as a Russian, Kropotkin was influenced by similar opinions throughout his life, culminating in a staunch anti-German prejudice at the onset of the First World War. Kropotkin was also influenced by fellow Russian anarchist Mikhail Bakunin, who was affected by his rivalry with Karl Marx; the successes of the Social Democratic Party of Germany, which subverted Germany's revolutionary movements; and the rise of the German Empire under the rule of Otto von Bismarck. As such, Woodcock notes Kropotkin came to despise the growth of Marxism, "German ideas", and augmented this with an interest in the French Revolution, which Woodcock referred to as "a kind of adoptive patriotism".

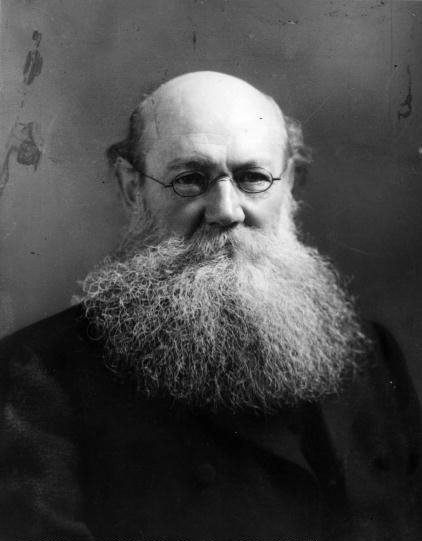
Manifesto co-author Peter Kropotkin (1842 – 1921), whose anti-German sentiment informed much of its content.

While in jail, Kropotkin was interviewed for an article to appear in the August 27 edition of The New York Times. The piece, which referred to him as a "veteran Russian agitator and democrat", quoted him as an optimistic supporter of the newly erupted war, believing it would ultimately have a liberalizing effect on Russian society. In a letter to Jean Grave, written in September of that year, Kropotkin chastised Grave for desiring a peaceful end to the conflict, and insisted that the war must be fought to its end since "the conditions of peace would be imposed by the victor".

Months later, Kropotkin allowed a letter he wrote to be included in an October 1914 issue of Freedom. Entitled "A Letter on the Present War", in it he made his case for the war, arguing that the presence of Germany's empire had prevented the progress of anarchist movements throughout Europe, and that the German people were as culpable for the war as the German state was. He also claimed that Russia's populace would be radicalized and united following victory in the war, preventing the Russian aristocracy from benefiting from the conflict. As such, he claimed that tactics designed to end the war, such as pacifism and general strikes, were unnecessary, and that instead the war should be pursued until Germany was defeated.

The Bolsheviks quickly responded to Kropotkin's militarism in a bid for political capital. Vladimir Lenin published a 1914 article in The National Pride of the Great Russians, in which he attacked Kropotkin and Russian anarchists en masse for the former's early pro-war sentiment, and denounced Kropotkin and another political enemy, Georgi Plekhanov, as "chauvinists by opportunism or spinelessness". In other speeches and essays, Lenin referred to Kropotkin in the early years of the war as a member of the "bourgeoisie", demoting him in the following months to "petit bourgeoisie".

Throughout 1915 and 1916, Kropotkin, who lived in Brighton, England, was often in poor health. He was unable to travel during the winter, having been ordered not to do so by doctors in January 1915, and underwent two operations to his chest in March. As a result, he was confined to a bed for the majority of 1915 and to a wheeled bath-chair in 1916. During this time, Kropotkin kept a steady correspondence with other anarchists, including fellow Russian anarchist Marie Goldsmith. Goldsmith and Kropotkin clashed often on their opinions about the World War, the role of internationalism during the conflict, and whether it was possible to advocate antimilitarism during that period (early 1916). As explained above, Kropotkin took firmly pro-war positions during these communiques, as he was predisposed to frequently criticize the German Empire.

=== Anarchist response to the War and Kropotkin ===
Unprepared by what historian Max Nettlau called the "explosive imminence" of the First World War at its outbreak in August 1914, anarchists resigned themselves to the reality of the situation and, after a time, began themselves to take sides. Like all nationals, the anarchists had been conditioned to react to the political interests of their nations, whose influence left few unaffected. On the climate of the time, Nettlau remarked: "The air was saturated with accepted nations, conventional opinions and the peculiar illusions which people entertained concerning small nationalities and the virtues and defects of certain races. There were all sorts of plausible justifications for imperialism, for financial controls and so on. And, since Tolstoy had been dead since 1910, no voice of libertarian and moral power was heard in the world: no organisation, large or small, spoke up." European anarchist activity was restricted both physically and by the internal divisions within the anarchist movement over attitudes towards the war.

It is very painful for me to oppose an old and beloved friend like Kropotkin, who has done so much for the cause of anarchism. But for the very reason that Kropotkin is so much esteemed and loved by us all, it is necessary to make known that we do not follow him in his utterances on the war...

— Errico Malatesta, 1914.

The November 1914 issue of Freedom featured articles supporting the Allied cause from anarchists including Kropotkin (Anti-Militarism: Was it Properly Understood?), Jean Grave (Ought Anarchists to Take Part in the War?), Warlaam Tcherkesoff ("The War, Its Causes, and German Responsibility") and Frans Verleben (Why Belgian Anarchists Fight) as well as a rebuttal to Kropotkin's "A Letter on the Present War", entitled "Anarchists Have Forgotten their Principles", by Italian anarchist Errico Malatesta. In the following weeks, numerous letters critical of Kropotkin were sent to Freedom, and in turn published due to the editorial impartiality of the newspaper's editor, Thomas Keell. Responding to the criticism, Kropotkin became enraged at Keell for not rejecting such letters, denouncing him as a coward unworthy of his role as editor. A meeting was later called by members of Freedom who supported Kropotkin's pro-war position and called for the paper to be suspended. Keell, the only anti-war anarchist called to attend, rejected the demand, ending the meeting in hostile disagreement. As a result, Kropotkin's connection with Freedom ended and the paper continued to be published as an organ for the majority of anti-war Freedom members.

By 1916, the Great War had been ongoing for almost two years, during which anarchists had taken part in anti-war movements across Europe, issuing numerous anti-war statements in anarchist and leftist publications. In February 1915, a statement called the Manifesto of the Thirty-Five was issued by an assembly of anarchists from various regions, including England, Switzerland, Italy, the United States, Russia, France, and the Netherlands. The document was signed by such figures as Domela Nieuwenhuis, Emma Goldman, Alexander Berkman, Luigi Bertoni, Saul Yanovsky, Harry Kelly, Thomas Keell, Lilian Wolfe, Rudolf Rocker, and George Barrett. It was also endorsed by Errico Malatesta and Alexander Schapiro, two of three secretaries elected to their position at the Anarchist International of 1907. It set out several viewpoints, including that all wars were the result of the current system of society, and therefore not the blame of any particular government; did not regard a defensive and offensive war as being fundamentally distinctly different; and encouraged all anarchists to support only class conflict and the liberation of oppressed populaces as a means by which to resolve wars between nation-states.

As a result of their increasing isolation from the majority of anti-war anarchists, George Woodcock notes that Kropotkin and anarchists who supported his position drew closer together in the months that preceded the Manifesto's creation. Several of these same men would later sign the Manifesto, including Jean Grave, Charles Malato, Paul Reclus, and Christiaan Cornelissen.

== The Manifesto ==
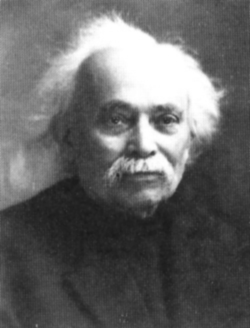
Jean Grave (1854 – 1939), who co-authored the manifesto after suggesting its creation.

=== Conception and publication ===
As he was unable to travel during 1916, Kropotkin found himself in frequent correspondence with others, including Jean Grave, who visited Kropotkin from France with his wife Mabel Holland Thomas Grave. Together, they discussed the war and Kropotkin's firm support for it. At Kropotkin's suggestion that he would like to have been a combatant were he younger, Grave suggested publishing a document urging anarchists to support the war effort on the side of the Allied Powers. Initially hesitant, due to his personal inability to sign up for active duty, Kropotkin was eventually persuaded by Grave.

Exactly what part each played in the authorship is unknown. At the time, Grave asserted that he had authored the manifesto and that Kropotkin had revised it. Alternatively, Grigorii Maksimov reported that Kropotkin had written the document and that Grave had merely advised minor alterations. George Woodcock noted that the work seems to be highly influenced by Kropotkin's common concerns and arguments against the German Empire, and so felt that the exact authorship was unimportant.

The Manifesto, which would be given its famous name at a later point, dates from February 28, 1916, and was first published in La Bataille on March 14. La Bataille was a controversial socialist periodical known for its support of the war, and was accused of being a front for government propaganda by Marxist groups as a result.

=== Contents ===
The original statement, ten paragraphs in length, includes philosophical and ideological premises based upon the opinions of Peter Kropotkin.

The essay begins by declaring that anarchists had correctly resisted the war from its inception, and that the authors would prefer a peace brought about by an international conference of European workers. It then submits that German workers would most likely also favor such a conclusion to the war, and presents several reasons why it would be in their best interest to call for an armistice. These reasons were that the citizens, after twenty months of war, would understand that they had been deceived into believing they were taking part in a defensive war; that they would recognize that the German state had long prepared for such a conflict, and as such it would be inevitably at fault; that the German Empire could not logistically support an occupation of the territory it had captured; and that the individuals living in the occupied territories were free to choose whether or not they would like to be annexed.

In our profound conscience, Germany's attack was a threat not only against our hopes of emancipation, but against all human evolution. That's why we, anarchists, we, antimilitarists, we, enemies of war, we, passionate partisans of peace and of fraternity of the people, we sided with resistance and believe we do not have to separate our fate from that of the population.

— Manifesto of the Sixteen, February 28, 1916.

Several paragraphs outline potential conditions for an armistice, rejecting any notion that the German Empire has any place in dictating the terms of peace. The authors also insist that the German populace must accept some blame for having not resisted the march to war on the part of the German government. The authors maintain that immediate calls for negotiation would not be favorable, as the German state would potentially dictate the process from a position of diplomatic and military power. Instead, the manifesto proclaims that the war must be continued so that the German state loses its military strength, and by extension, its ability to negotiate.

The authors proclaim that, due to their anti-government, antimilitarist, and internationalist philosophy, supporting the war was an act of "resistance" to the German Empire. The manifesto then concludes that victory over Germany and the overthrow of the Social Democratic Party of Germany and other ruling parties of the German Empire would advance the anarchist goal of the emancipation of Europe and of the German people, and that the authors are prepared to collaborate with Germans to advance this goal.

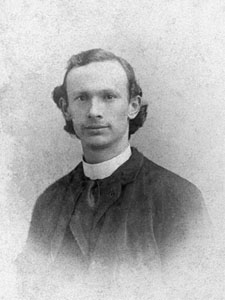
Dutch anarcho-syndicalist Christiaan Cornelissen (1864 – 1942) was a prominent signatory of the manifesto

=== Signatories and supporters ===
The manifesto was signed by some of the most eminent anarchists in Europe. The signatories originally numbered fifteen, with the mistaken sixteenth name, "Hussein Dey", being the name of the city in which Antoine Orfila lived. As the manifesto's co-authors, Jean Grave and Peter Kropotkin were among its first signatories.

From France, the anarcho-syndicalists Christiaan Cornelissen and François Le Levé were signatories; Cornelissen was a supporter of the union sacrée, a truce between the French government and trade unions during the First World War, and wrote several anti-German brochures, while the thirty-two-year-old Le Levé later joined the French Resistance during the Second World War. Another French signatory was Paul Reclus, brother of renowned anarchist Élisée Reclus, whose endorsement of the war and manifesto convinced Japanese anarchist Sanshirō Ishikawa (who was staying with Reclus) to sign. Ishikawa signed the paper as "Tchikawa".

Varlam Cherkezishvili (who signed in the Russian manner as "Warlaam Tcherkesoff"), a Georgian anarchist, Marxist critic, and journalist was another noteworthy signatory. The remaining signatories of the initial publication of the document were Henri Fuss, Jacques Guérin, Charles-Ange Laisant, Charles Malato, Jules Moineau, Antoine Orfila, Marc Pierrot and Ph. Richard. James Guillaume, although a supporter of the war, was for reasons unknown not an initial signatory. The manifesto was countersigned by approximately one hundred other anarchists, half of whom were Italian anarchists.

== Impact and legacy ==
Anarchists owe it to themselves to protest against this attempt to implicate Anarchism in the continuance of a ferocious slaughter that has never held promise of any benefit to the cause of justice & liberty, & which now shows itself to be absolutely barren & resultless even from the standpoint of the rulers on either side.

— Errico Malatesta, 1916.

The publication of the Manifesto was met with great disapproval by the international anarchist movement, and in considering its impact, George Woodcock stated that it "merely confirmed the split which existed in the anarchist movement." The signatories of the Manifesto saw the First World War as a battle between German imperialism and the international working class. In contrast, most anarchists of the time, including Emma Goldman and Alexander Berkman, saw the war as being that of different capitalist-imperialist states at the expense of the working class. The number of supporters of Kropotkin's position peaked at perhaps 100 or so, while the overwhelming majority of anarchists embraced Goldman's and Berkman's views.

Alongside the reprinted manifesto in the letter columns of Freedom in April 1916 was a prepared response by Errico Malatesta. Malatesta's response, titled "Governmental Anarchists", recognized the "good faith and good intentions" of the signatories but accused them of having betrayed anarchist principles. Malatesta was soon joined in denunciation by others, including Luigi Fabbri, Sébastien Faure, and Emma Goldman^{[I]}:

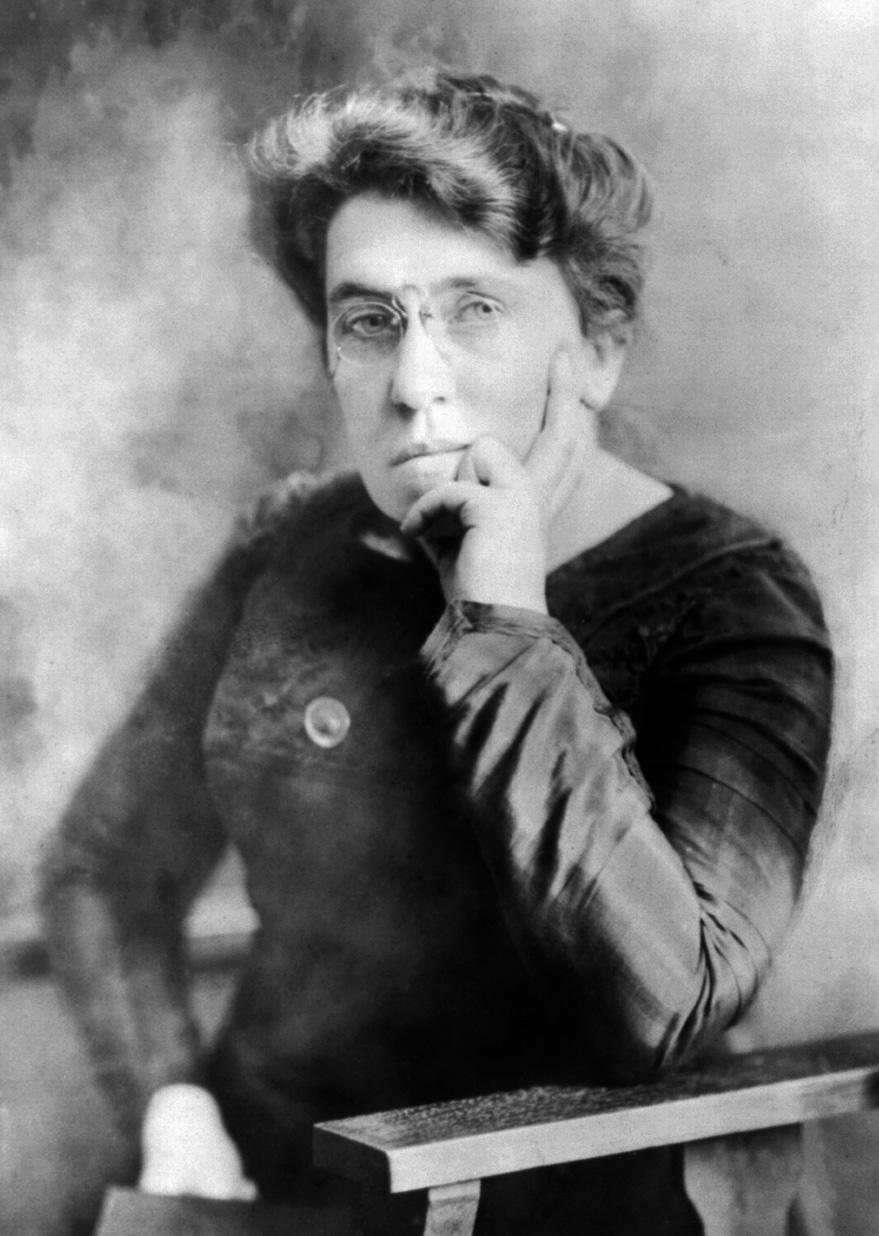
Internationalist anarchist Emma Goldman (1869 – 1940) pictured circa 1911. Goldman stridently opposed the war and the Manifesto, and served two years in prison in the United States as a result of her activism.

We determined to repudiate Peter [Kropotkin]'s stand, & fortunately we were not alone in this. Many others felt as we did, distressing as it was to turn against the man who had so long been our inspiration. [...] To be sure, we were but a handful in comparison with the war-drunk millions, but we succeeded in circulating throughout the world the manifesto issued by our International Bureau, & we increased our energies at home to expose the true nature of militarism.

— Emma Goldman, Living My Life.

As a result of his firm support of the war, Kropotkin's popularity dwindled, and many former friends cut ties with him. Two exceptions included Rudolf Rocker and Alexander Schapiro, but both were serving prison sentences at the time. As a result, Kropotkin became increasingly isolated during his final years in London prior to his return to Russia. In Peter Kropotkin: His Federalist Ideas (1922), an overview of Kropotkin's writings by Camillo Berneri, the author interjected criticism of the former's militarism. Berneri wrote, "with his pro-war attitude Kropotkin separated himself from anarchism," and asserted that the Manifesto of the Sixteen "marks the culmination of incoherence in the pro-war anarchists; [Kropotkin] also supported Kerensky in Russia on the question of prosecuting the war." Anarchist scholar Vernon Richards speculates that were it not for the desire of Freedom editor Thomas Keell (himself staunchly anti-war) to give the supporters of the war a fair hearing from the start, they might have found themselves politically isolated far earlier.

=== Russia ===
Historian Paul Avrich describes the fallout over the support for the war an "almost fatal" division in the Russian anarchist movement. Muscovite anarchists split into two groups, with the larger faction supporting Kropotkin and his "defensist" associates; the smaller anti-war faction responded by abandoning Kropotkinite anarchist communism for anarcho-syndicalism. In spite of this, the anarchist movement in Russia continued to gain strength. In an article published in a December 1916 issue of The State and Revolution, Bolshevik leader Lenin accused the vast majority of Russian anarchists of following Kropotkin and Grave, and denounced them as "anarcho-chauvinists". Similar remarks were made by other Bolsheviks, such as Joseph Stalin, who wrote in a letter to a Communist leader, "I have recently read Kropotkin's articles—the old fool must have completely lost his mind". Leon Trotsky cited Kropotkin's support for the war and his manifesto while further denouncing anarchism:

The superannuated anarchist Kropotkin, who had a weakness ever since youth for the Narodniks, made use of the war to disavow everything he had been teaching for almost half a century. This denouncer of the State supported the Entente, and if he denounced the double power in Russia, it was not in the name of anarchy, but in the name of a single power of the bourgeoisie.

— Trotsky, Leon, The History of the Russian Revolution, 1930

Historian George Woodcock characterized these criticisms as acceptable insofar as they focused on Kropotkin's militarism. However, he found the criticisms of Russian anarchists to be "unjustified", and regarding accusations that Russian anarchists embraced Kropotkin and Grave's message, Woodcock stated, "nothing of the kind happened; only about a hundred anarchists signed the various pronouncements in support of the war; the majority in all countries maintained the anti-militarist position as consistently as the Bolsheviks."

=== Switzerland and Spain ===
A group of "internationalists" in Geneva – Iuda Grossman, Aleksandr Ge and Kropotkin's disciple Georgy Gogelia among them – denounced the anarchist supporters of the Allies as "Anarcho-Patriots". They maintained that the only form of war acceptable to true anarchists was the social revolution that would overthrow the bourgeoisie and their oppressive institutions. Jean Wintsch, founder of the Ferrer School of Lausanne and editor of La libre fédération, was isolated from the Swiss anarchist movement when he aligned himself with the Manifesto and its signatories.

The Spanish anarcho-syndicalists, who opposed the war out of doctrinaire cynicism and a belief that neither faction were on the workers' side, angrily repudiated their former idols (including Kropotkin, Malato and Grave) after discovering they had authored the manifesto. A small number of anarchists in Galicia and Asturias dissented and were heatedly denounced by the majority of Catalan anarcho-syndicalists (who prevailed in the anarchist union Confederación Nacional del Trabajo).

== See also ==
- Anarchism and violence
- Opposition to World War I
- Spirit of 1914

== Footnotes ==
I. In her autobiography, Living My Life, Emma Goldman recalled numerous anarchists from the warring nations of Britain, France, the Netherlands, and Germany, who she contrasted with Kropotkin for their anti-war stance during World War I. Among those in Britain, she listed Errico Malatesta, Rudolf Rocker, Alexander Schapiro, Thomas H. Keell, and "other native & Jewish-speaking anarchists". In France, she noted Sébastien Faure, "A. Armand" (E. Armand? — ed.), and "members of the anarchist & syndicalist movements". From the Netherlands she counted Domela Nieuwenhuis and "his co-workers". And of Germany, she listed Gustav Landauer, Erich Mühsam, Fritz Oerter, Fritz Kater, and "scores of other comrades".

== Bibliography ==
- Avrich, Paul (2005). The Russian Anarchists. Edinburgh: AK Press. ISBN 978-1-904859-48-2. OCLC 65204096.
- Berneri, Camillo (1943). Peter Kropotkin: His Federalist Ideas. London: Freedom Press. OCLC 256074911.
- Confino, Michaël (1981). "Anarchisme et internationalisme. Autour du Manifeste des Seize Correspondance inédite de Pierre Kropotkine et de Marie Goldsmith, janvier-mars 1916". Cahiers du Monde Russe et Soviétique. 22 (2–3): 231–249. doi:10.3406/cmr.1981.1914. S2CID 161829629.
- Crump, John (1993). Hatta Shūzō and Pure Anarchism in Interwar Japan. New York, NY: St. Martin's Press. ISBN 978-0-312-10631-7. OCLC 28585495.
- Ghe, Alexandre (1987). Lettre ouverte a P. Kropotkine. Alexandria, Virginia: Chadwyck-Healey Inc. OCLC 221190113.
- Goldman, Emma (1930). Living My Life. New York: Dover Publications. OCLC 42598818.
- Guérin, Daniel (2005). No Gods, No Masters: An Anthology of Anarchism. Oakland, CA; Edinburgh: AK Press. ISBN 978-1-904859-25-3. OCLC 67874678.
- Kropotkin, Peter (October 1914). "A Letter to Steffen". Freedom.
- Maitron, Jean (1975). Le mouvement anarchiste en France. Vol. II (in French). Paris: François Maspero. OCLC 79508348.
- Meaker, Gerald (1974). The Revolutionary Left in Spain, 1914-1923. Stanford: Stanford University Press. ISBN 978-0-8047-0845-6. OCLC 1205813.
- Nettlau, Max (1996). A Short History of Anarchism. London: Freedom Press. ISBN 978-0-900384-89-9. OCLC 37529250.
- Nettlau, Max (1924). Errico Malatesta: The Biography of an Anarchist. New York, NY: Jewish Anarchist Federation.
- Richards, Vernon (1965). Errico Malatesta: His Life & Ideas. London: Freedom Press. OCLC 246691800.
- Rosmer, Alfred (1987). Lenin's Moscow. London: Bookmarks. ISBN 978-0-906224-37-3. OCLC 17158402.
- Skirda, Alexandre (2002). Facing the enemy: a history of anarchist organization from Proudhon to May 1968. Edinburgh; Oakland, CA: AK Press/Kate Sharpley Library. ISBN 978-1-902593-19-7. OCLC 50014468.
- Wexler, Alice (1984). Emma Goldman: An Intimate Life. New York: Pantheon Books. ISBN 978-0-394-52975-2. OCLC 230810657.
- Woodcock, George (1990). Peter Kropotkin: From Prince to Rebel. Montréal: Black Rose Books. ISBN 978-0-921689-60-7. OCLC 21156316.
- Woodcock, George; Avakumovic, Ivan (1970). The Anarchist Prince: A Biographical Study of Peter Kropotkin. London, New York: T. V. Boardman. OCLC 2676280.
