= The Family as a Type of Society =

19th century anarchist-feminist essay

- Author: Charlotte Wilson
- Genre: Political philosophy, anarcha-feminism
- Publication date: 1886
- Publication place: United Kingdom

The Family as a Type of Society is an anarchist and anarcha-feminist essay written in 1886 by Charlotte Wilson. Initially published in the journal The Anarchist, Wilson delved into her reflections on the nature of patriarchy in society, its emergence, and the connections it would establish with the rise of the State and social hierarchies. Furthermore, she aimed to present a model of harmonious communal living between women and men after the anarchist revolution.

== History ==
=== Context and publication ===
Charlotte Wilson was a renowned anarchist in British circles; she notably co-founded the journal Freedom with Peter Kropotkin. Her reflections focused particularly on patriarchy, exploring its emergence and persistence in modern societies as part of her intellectual development. In 1886, she published this text in the journal The Anarchist and republished it the following year.

The publication of the article sparked conflicts between Wilson and Kropotkin, with the latter seeing her as imposing it in an "undemocratic" manner. For her part, Wilson had a very poor relationship with Henry Seymour, accusing him of having delayed the launch of the journal Freedom.

== Contents ==
In the text, Wilson conducted anthropological and historical research on ancient societies to establish that the authority of the husband was one of the precursors to political domination. In other words, patriarchy facilitated the establishment of other social and political hierarchies.

She also questioned the new form that relationships between women and men would take after the anarchist revolution, once social and political structures of domination were to be abolished. On this subject, she stated:

A society of free equals, of friendly men and women, who know how to give and take, understand sharing and the community of work, rest, and enjoyment. This autonomous commune of autonomous units, the springs of whose life are in reasonable good will, is Anarchism realized.
