= Madonna del Lino, Brescia =

Church in Brescia, Italy

Coordinates: 45.5374014°N 10.2178063°E

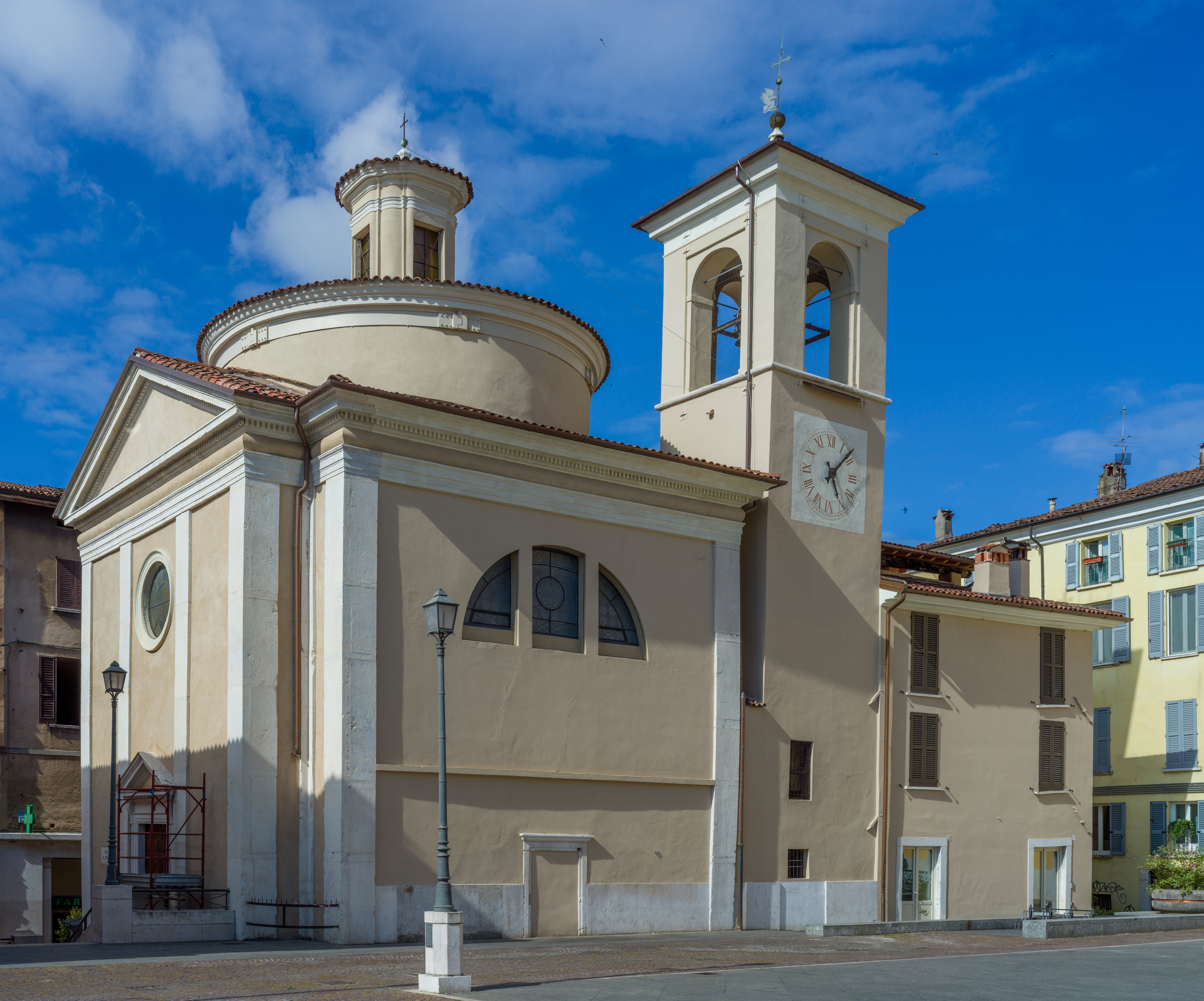
Church from the piazza

Madonna del Lino or Santa Maria del Mercato del Lino is a Roman Catholic church located on the Southwest corner of Piazza Mercato in Brescia, region of Lombardy, Italy.

== History ==
Construction of the church, awkwardly placed flanking the piazza, began in 1608 to designs by Pietro Maria Bagnadore, aiming to shelter a venerated icon of the Madonna and Child that had been painted on a fountain at the site. The church takes its name from the Market of the Linens (lino) that was previously held in the piazza. The small church has a round, two layer dome placed atop a square nave with a short bell-tower.

An inventory of works in 1826 noted an altarpiece of St Anne and young St Mary with Sts Joseph and John the Baptist by Andrea Celesti. At present the church holds only remnants of frescoes by Giovanni Paolo Cavagna. The Celesti altarpiece is now in the sacristy, and was replaced by a St Charles, St Anthony of Padua, St Anne and St Joseph venerate the Crucifix by Antonio Dusi.
