= Woolf Wess =

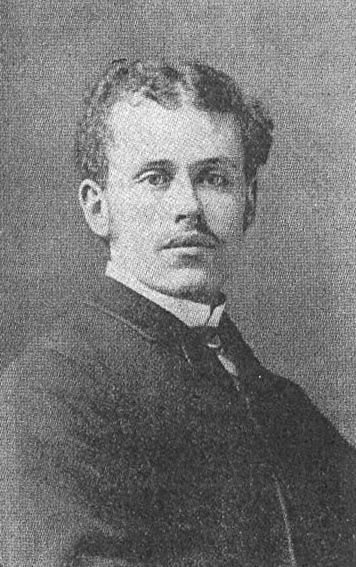
- Woolf Wess as a young man.
- Born: Woolf Wess; 1861; Ukmergė, Russian Empire
- Died: 23 May 1946; London, England, United Kingdom
- Other names: William Wess; William West
- Occupations: Shoemaker, machinist, printer, typesetter, editor
- Organization: Freedom Press

Woolf Wess (also known as William Wess or William West; 1861 – 23 May 1946) was a Jewish immigrant to the United Kingdom who from 1884 spent much of his time community organising in London. An anarchist, trade unionist, and a newspaper editor, Wess was active in the Socialist League and is notable for his involvement with the International Working Men's Educational Club, and Freedom Press.

== Before London ==
Wess was born in 1861 in Ukmergė, Russian Empire (now Lithuania), to a Hasidic baker. At the age of twelve, he was apprenticed to a shoemaker. He also worked as a factory machinist in Dvinsk (now Daugavpils, Latvia). In 1881, Wess immigrated to England to avoid military service.

== Activities in London ==
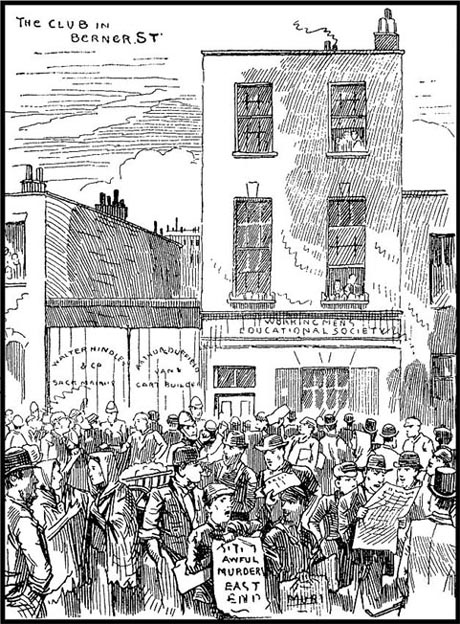
"The Club in Berner Street", drawing from the Pictorial News, 6 October 1888.

After arriving in London, Wess joined the Hackney branch of the Socialist League and became one of the founders of the International Working Men's Educational Club, which was located at 40 Berner Street (now called Henriques Street) in the East End. He later became its secretary and the overseer in the printing office there. In 1888, he was the first witness called at the inquest into the death of Elizabeth Stride, a victim of Jack the Ripper.

Wess became heavily involved in the local labour movement and "[...] played an important part in the Jewish trade-union movement in Britain. He helped to establish almost all of the Jewish unions in the 1880s and 1890s." In one case, he was the secretary for the strike committee of a group of East London tailors during their strike from 27 August to 2 October 1889. As secretary, he ensured that the strikers and their families had their basic needs fulfilled by obtaining donations from philanthropists and other trade unions, including £100 from the dockers' union. The next year, Wess became the founding secretary of the East London Workers' Unions, later becoming the secretary of the International Tailors, Machinists and Pressers' Trade Union and the United Ladies' Tailors and Mantle Makers' Association. He also helped to set up a Jewish cooperative bakery on Brushfield Street in Spitalfields.

In the same year, he began to help in the typesetting of Freedom, an anarchist newspaper started in 1886. He became the manager of the Freedom Press in 1891 and went on speaking tours alongside Pyotr Kropotkin, Errico Malatesta, Louise Michel, and Saul Yanovsky. When Yanovsky left for the United States, he was briefly replaced by Jacob Kaplan as the editor of Arbeyter Fraynd (Worker's Friend), a weekly Yiddish anarchist newspaper. Kaplan, however, was quickly replaced in October 1895 by the more experienced Wess.

By the beginning of the 20th century, Wess' participation in the Jewish trade union movement had been reduced. He took up a job as a bookkeeper in a tobacco factory and in 1904, he stayed with Tom Keell, the compositor and new manager of Freedom. In February 1906, Wess and Lilian Wolfe (Keell's partner and another member of the Freedom publishing group), were setting up the Arbeyter Fraynd Club on Jubilee Street, Whitechapel. By June of that year, he and Rudolf Rocker were serving on another tailors' strike committee.

Wess spent 1928–1929 rebuilding the London Freedom Group, only for it to close down in 1931. By the late 30s, Wess had revived it again and had become involved in solidarity work for the Spanish Revolution with Emma Goldman. By 1946, he was still active as a speaker within Jewish radical circles in London, making a speech to commemorate the 55th anniversary of the first publication of the Freie Arbeiter Stimme (Free Worker's Voice or Free Voice of Labor). He died on 23 May of that year at the age of 84 and was cremated at Golders Green Crematorium. In his obituary, he was noted as an atheist, as a number of anarchists were at the time.

== See also ==
- Anarchism in the United Kingdom
