= Leve =

Leve, Levé or Le Levé is a surname. Notable people with the surname include:

- Ariel S. Leve (born 1968), American author and award-winning journalist
- Édouard Levé (1965–2007), French writer, photographer, and painter
- François Le Levé (1882–1945), French anarcho-syndicalist
- Gijs de Leve (1926–2009), Dutch mathematician and operations researcher
- Harriet Leve, American theater and movie producer
