= Alfred Marsh =

English anarchist (1858–1914)

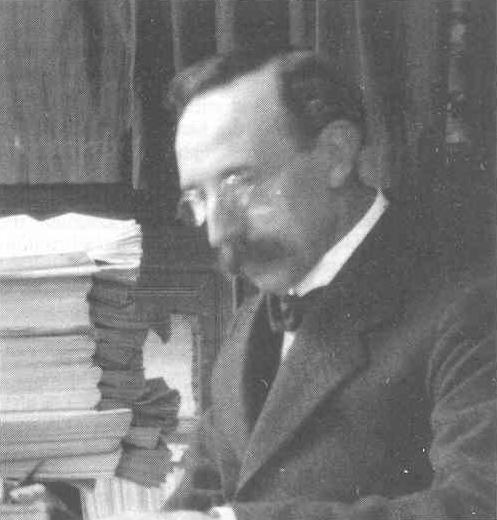
- Born: 3 November 1858; Clerkenwell, London, England
- Died: 13 October 1914 (aged 55); Hastings, England
- Occupations: Newspaper editor; Violinist; Music teacher
- Known for: Editing Freedom
- Spouse: Emilie Ashurst Holyoake (m. 1894)

Alfred Marsh (3 November 1858 – 13 October 1914) was an anarchist-communist and long-time editor and stalwart of the newspaper Freedom.

== Early years ==
Marsh was born in Clerkenwell, London. Having lost his mother at an early age, he was brought up by his father who was of a radical inclination. His father was a close friend of secularist and co-operative pioneer George Holyoake. In 1894, he married Holyoake's daughter, Emilie Ashurst Holyoake. His childhood meant he was heavily influenced by the radical ideas of Robert Owen, and his close associate Dr. Henry Travis.

== Political development ==
In around 1883 he read Bakunin’s God and the State which left a lasting impression on him. He was thrown out of by his father on the account of having a relationship with a woman from his brush factory. From there on in, Marsh’s livelihood was garnered from earning working as a violinist in theatre orchestras and by giving music lessons. He is said to have had a modest lifestyle and contributed regularly his meagre income to ensure the Freedom newspaper stayed afloat over the years.

Like many a radical, he joined the Social Democratic Federation, but was disgusted at the abusive and opportunistic nature of H. M Hyndman and his followers. After joining in 1886, he left not soon after.

The Haymarket Martyrs had been something of a turning point and he by this time began to identify as an anarchist-communist.

== Political activities ==
He became close associates with John Turner and this cemented his relationship with the Freedom group. He would contribute regularly for the paper, often anonymously; he would also regularly speak at talks. His first such talk at Farringdon Hall attacked the labour leader John Burns and his view of social democracy as a stepping stone to communism.

Freedom had had problems functioning with Charlotte Wilson as editor, suffering as she was with personal difficulties in 1889 and again in 1895. Marsh soon restarted it in May 1895 on the advice of William Wess, and they were joined by ex-members of the defunct Socialist League's publication, Commonweal – John Turner, Tom Cantwell, and Joseph Presburg.

As well as editing Freedom for the next twenty years he also edited the short-lived Voice of Labour which was a to workplace agitation paper published by Freedom Press. This time was particularly difficult, because Britain had undertaken a very jingoistic turn around the Boer Wars and the climate was not entirely favourable to anarchist ideas. Using his father inheritance in 1909 he was able to bring out complete edition in English of God and the State as well as being able to reprint all the Freedom Press pamphlets.

From 1910 onwards he is understood to have been of declining health and editorship of Freedom was handed over to Tom Keell. It is during this time he is expressed his dismay to find the founder of Freedom, Peter Kropotkin, surrounded by rich sycophants and with little time to see his old anarchist friends when he visited him in France.

In September 1914 he was told he had inoperable cancer, from which he died a month later in Hastings.

Posthumously, anarchists set up a meeting place in 1915 called Marsh House, on Mecklenburgh St, London, near Russell Square in his honour.

Media offices
Preceded by Charlotte Wilson	Editor of Freedom; 1895–1910	Succeeded by Thomas Keell
