= Charlotte Wilson =

English anarchist and member of the Fabian Society

Charlotte M. Wilson
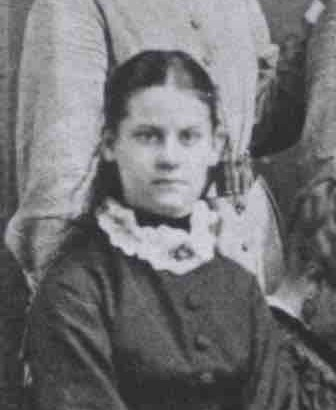
- Wilson at Newnham College c.1874
- Born: Charlotte Mary Martin; 6 May 1854; Kemerton, Worcestershire, England
- Died: 6 May 1944 (aged 90); Irvington-on-Hudson, New York, United States
- Other names: C.M. Wilson; Mrs Arthur Wilson; Charlotte Mary Wilson; Charlotte Martin Wilson
- Education: Cheltenham College; Merton Hall, Cambridge
- Years active: 1884–1914
- Known for: The Anarchist; Freedom
- Notable work: What socialism is (1886) (With Helen Blagg) Women and Prisons (1912)

Charlotte Mary Wilson (6 May 1854, Kemerton, Worcestershire – 28 April 1944, Irvington-on-Hudson, New York) was an English Fabian and anarchist who co-founded Freedom newspaper in 1886 with Peter Kropotkin, and edited, published, and largely financed it during its first decade. She remained editor of Freedom until 1895.

== Early life and education ==
Charlotte Wilson was born Charlotte Mary Martin into an upper middle-class family in Kemerton, in Worcestershire, a village near the town of Tewkesbury in the adjoining county of Gloucestershire. Her father, Robert Spencer Martin, was a physician and surgeon, who held many medical posts including that of the District Medical Officer of the Tewkesbury Union (the local workhouse), whose grandfather was a silk manufacturer, while her mother, Clementina Susannah Davies, came from a prosperous commercial and clerical family in Worcester.

Wilson initially attended Cheltenham College, where "she was very unhappy". Afterwards, in 1873, she attended Merton Hall, Cambridge, "one of England's first institutions of higher education for women". Oliver (1983, p. 26) stated that she "never went to Girton" (Girton being Girton College, Cambridge University). (Note: E. Nesbit, the Fabian writer and poet (c. Summer 1885), quoted in Briggs 1987, p. 69, seems to have started what Oliver 1983, pp. 26–27 called "the Girton error" by describing Wilson as a "Girton girl". Anarchist George Woodcock and Ivan Avakumoović (1971, originally 1950) followed Nesbit by describing Wilson as a "Girton graduate" (Woodcock & Avakumoović 1971, p. 202). (Oliver 1983, p. 26 observed that Wilson "could not have been a graduate" because women "were not eligible for Cambridge degrees until 1923.") Woodcock and Avakumoović (1971, originally 1950) were in turn followed by MacCarthy 2014, p. 13, who described Wilson as "Girton-educated".) In college Wilson took the Higher Local Examination, and passed papers in A1 (English) and B2 (Logic, Psychology and Political Economy). (Note: In contrast, Hinely (1987) observed that she won "distinguished marks in history." (Hinely 1987, p. 23).)

== Married life ==
By September 1876, Wilson was living in the rectory of All Souls Church in City of Westminster, Central London, where she married Arthur Wilson, son of the vicar of Islington in North London, a distant cousin, a graduate of Wadham College, Oxford and a stockbroker who had his own office in the city. Hinely (1987) observed that the couple began married life in Islington, from where, sometime before 1879, they moved to the Vale of Health. in Hampstead Heath. From there, within two years, they moved to Elm Lodgea very large Georgian manse in the centre of Hampstead. While there, Wilson "began her lifelong career as an organizer". In 1879 she became a visitor for the Metropolitan Association for Befriending Young Servants, which was co-founded by Henrietta Barnett, one of her neighbours. In the same year, a March issue of the Hampstead and Highgate Express included an announcement about a proposal to form a society "to provide instruction by letters and classes both to men and women, under the direct auspices of Oxford, Cambridge and London Universities". Wilson became its secretary, part of whose role included locating lecturers and examinations for the courses. The lecturers in included Herbert Foxwell, from Cambridge University, under whom she had studied at Merton Hall, who lectured on "Socialism and the Capitalist System". Not long afterwards, by 1883, Wilson had become a socialist, having joined the early London Socialist movement, with her husband at her side.

Oliver (1983) observed that, after the end of 1884, the couple moved to Wildwood Farm, at the very edge of Hampstead Heath, later to become known as Wyldes Farm: "a change to a more simple life-style – the impact of Kropotkin's trial in January 1883" (Note: See Trial of the 66.), during which the prosecutor focused heavily upon his involvement in the 1881 London Social Revolutionary Congress. Wilson later wrote in 1885:

"When the noble words of Kropotkine's [sic] defence ran through the length and breadth of France, they found an echo in the hearts of all honest seekers after truth." (Note: Wilson in the April 1885 issue of The Anarchist quoted by Oliver 1983, p. 28.) (Note: Oliver (1983) observed that Wilson "could have read these 'noble words' in The Times reports". (Oliver 1983, p. 28).)

In the same year, E. Nesbit, the Fabian writer and poet described Wilson's situation as follows:

"She has a husband who is very nice, and a perfect gentleman. Did I tell you about her house? He is a stockbroker and they used to live in a charming and rather expensive house at Hampstead, but she at last declined to live any longer on his earnings (which she tersely terms the 'wages of iniquity') and now they have taken quite a little cottage where she means to keep herself by keeping fowles! It is a charming and quite idyllic little farm. They have two rooms - study and kitchen. The kitchen is an idealised farm kitchen, where of course no cooking is done - but with a cushioned settle, open hearth, polished dresser and benches and all the household glass and crockery displayed, mixed up with aesthetic pots, pans, curtains, chairs and tables - a delightfully incongruous but altogether agreeable effect." (Italics in the original)

MacCarthy (2014) observed: "The country cottage cult was particularly strong amongst intellectual women of the 1890s. For instance, Charlotte Wilson, Girton-educated [sic] anarchist and feminist, an aficionado of the style - so much so that many people believed she had invented it - held famous Fabian gatherings in her farmhouse kitchen, a room in which no cooking ever seems to have been done." (Note: In 1887 Edward Carpenter, the utopian socialist, had his tract England's ideal published in which he proposed an adoption of "a very simple form of life", see Simple living.(Carpenter 1887, p. 41).)

== Political life ==
=== The Fabians ===
Woodcock documented that Wilson "was a founder member of the Fabian Society, and in December 1884 was elected, with Bernard Shaw and three others, to its first executive committee." Also, starting in the late 1870s, she formed or joined numerous organisations. For example, she founded an informal political study group for advanced thinkers, known as the Hampstead Historic Club, also known as the Karl Marx Society or the Proudhon Society. Fabian Sydney Olivier (1948) described what he called the Hampstead Historic meetings (of the Hampstead Historic Club, also known as the Karl Marx Society or the Proudhon Society) which:

"were to a certain extent presided over by Mrs. Charlotte Wilson and were held at her home in a cottage on Hampstead Heath called Wildwood Farm. Arthur Wilson, her husband, kept in the background, but Mrs Wilson, who called herself an Anarchist, was a clever speaker besides being a kind and gratious hostess. She seemed to me a very peaceful form of Anarchist, so did all the others who came to the meetings, some of them Russians. Mrs. Dryhurst, who also called herself an Anarchist, came and with her the young lady who afterwards became Mrs. Edward R. Pease. There were also the Fabian Socialists, Webb, Wallas, Shaw, and others. Someone read a paper and this was followed by discussion, often very vigorous and exciting and lasting till Mrs Wilson interrupted it with sandwiches and drinks, after which we all turned out on to the Heath." (Note: No records of the club have survived. However, there are references to it in the memoirs of several of those who attended. For example, in her history of Wyldes, Wilson recorded the names of some of those who visited her house, most of whom are known to have been present at club meetings.Wilson 1902 The names included: Sidney Webb, George Bernard Shaw, Sydney Olivier, Annie Besant, Graham Wallas, Belfort Bax, Edward Pease, E. Nesbit, Hubert Bland, Karl Pearson, Havelock Ellis, Edward Carpenter, Frank Podmore, Ford Madox Brown, and Olive Schreiner among others. The secretary was Emma Brooke. (Daniels 2003).)

The club initially turned its attention to studying Das Kapital by Karl Marx which was read out by a Russian woman in French but later turned to Proudhon. In 1889 George Bernard Shaw described the Club discussions and how heated they became. Although the Fabian Society and Hampstead Historic Club contained many of the same people, they remained separate. The ideas debated by the club resulted in the publication of Fabian Essays in Socialism in 1889. This led Shaw to describe Hampstead, and the meetings, as "the birthplace of middle-class socialism."

Also, Wilson formed The Society of Friends of Russian Freedom with Sergei Stepniak, Karl Pearson and Wilfrid Voynich. (Note: In this context, Wilson is believed to be the model for Gemma in the best-selling novel The Gadfly by Ethel Voynich. (Walter 2007, p. 229, Bevir 2011, p. 258).)

In September 1886, the Fabian Society had two powerful female members, Wilson and Annie Besant. However, Wilson "had been gradually edged out by Annie Besant's determination that the Society should adopt an active political role". Consequently, the society held a meeting in Anderton's Hotel in Fleet Street of the various socialist organisations in the city to debate the possibility of forming a political party based upon the party model of politics that was being adopted in Continental Europe. Besant made such a proposal and Hubert Bland seconded it, while William Morris proposed and Wilson seconded an amendment to it. Their amendment was:

"But whereas the first duty of Socialism is to educate people to understand what their present position is and what the future might be, and to keep the principles of socialism steadily before them; and whereas no Parliamentary party can exist without compromise and concession, which would hinder that education and obscure those principles: it would be a false step for Socialists to attempt to take part in the Parliamentary contest."

The amendment was defeated. Consequently Wilson "resigned from the Fabian executive in April 1887, and took no active part in the society for twenty years, though she maintained her membership."

=== Anarchism ===
While Wilson was in the Hamstead Historic Club, she particularly admired William Morris. However, she then changed her allegiance to anarchist Peter Kropotkin. Also, from 1884 to 1896, she wrote extensively to Karl Pearson about anarchism, the Fabians, the Karl Marx Society and about her hoped-for Russian Society. (Note: See the Pearson Papers (ref. 900) at UCL.) In particular, she asked his advice about reading Marx and tried to justify to him her view of human nature that "made anarchism the only moral system of politics." However, by 1885 Wilson had met Henry Seymour, a former secularist who had become converted to anarchism, and a printer and publisher who had decided to produce an anarchist paper, The Anarchist. When Wilson learnt of his intention, she promised to contribute articles to the paper, under the name of An English Anarchist. (Note: Wilson had previously used the pen name twice in the November 1844 issue of Justice, the weekly newspaper of the Social Democratic Federation. (Quail 2019, p. 67).) The first issue was published in March 1885. It contained "greetings from Éisée Reclus and the French-speaking International anarchist circle of London" and the article What's in a Name? (How an anarchist Might Put It) which was written by George Bernard Shaw at Wilson's request. The third issue in May "announced that 'a circle of English Anarchists' was about to be formed in London." Quail (2019, originally 1978) observed: "By July the 'English Anarchists' were meeting more or less monthly" and that Wilson was probably a member.

In mid-January 1886, Peter Kropotkin, who was sick with malaria and scurvy, was finally released with his anarchist colleagues from Clairvaux Prison. During his imprisonment, Wilson had been in touch with his wife. On the 20th January, Kropotkin wrote to George Herzig, a friend of his in Geneva: "I am called to London to found an anarchist (English) paper; the means are existant and I will get to work busily". Woodock and Avakumoović (1971) commented: "It is not certain from whom the 'call' came, but it was very probably from Charlotte Wilson".

The March 1886 issue of The Anarchist 'announced that Kropotkin was now in London and that the paper had become the "recognised organ of the English Anarchist Party"'. (Note: Kropotkin and his wife settled in Harrow, London. (Osofsky 1979, p. 40).) However, Woodcock (1990) documented:

"The founding of an anarchist periodical was one of Kropotkin's first concerns, and it seems certain that the original Freedom Group began in March, or at the latest in the first half of April. The first members seem to have been Kropotkin and his wife, Charlotte Wilson, Dr Burns Gibson, and one or two others." (Note: Unfortunately Woodcock called Dr J. Burns-Gibson Dr Burns Gibson. Burns-Gibson was a medical doctor, a public speaker, a book reviewer and a much-published author who wrote on, among other subjects, philosophy and psychology. He was a member of the Aristotelian Society and the Philosophical Society. And he was closely associated with the Fabian Society and the Socialist League. His article ‘Anarchism kills individualism’ was published anonymously on page 3 of the first issue of Freedom. Nassim (date currently unknown) described his involvement in the early history of the Aristotelian Society.)

The July issue of The Anarchist "reported on a difference of opinion with Mrs Wilson, saying that at a Fabian conference which she could not attend because she was ill, she was to have represented a new group, 'The London Anarchist Group of Freedom'."

Woodcock (1990) observed: "Kropotkin and his friends decided to withdraw from The Anarchist, and in October 1886 the first issue of Freedom appeared in the form of a four-page sheet. Wilson became its editor and remained in the post until 1895. The newspaper's mission statement was stated in every issue, on page 2, and summarised the writers' view of anarchism:

"Anarchists work towards a society of mutual aid and voluntary co-operation. We reject all government and economic repression. This newspaper, published continuously since 1936, exists to explain anarchism more widely and show that only in an anarchist society can human freedom thrive."

=== Return to the Fabians ===
Wilson did not involve herself in left-wing politics for the remainder of the century, during which her father died in 1896, with the death of her mother following in 1903. Wilson resumed political activity in 1906. She did not disavow anarchist ideology. However, she aligned herself with the Fabian Society, and from 1908 to 1913, she served as its General Secretary, during which she joined the campaign for female suffrage.

Wilson was also the main founder of the Fabian Women's Group, which:

"originated in a drawing-room of fashionable South Kensington. At its first gathering in March 1908, fourteen ladies pledged to unite in the study of the relation between the two most vital movements of the day: socialism and feminism. Many distinguished and remarkable women were involved, including Beatrice Webb, novelist Edith Nesbitt, birthcontroller Annie Besant, shopworker and first woman cabinet minister Margaret Bondfield, and 1902s Labour MP Susan Lawrence."

Wilson hosted the meetings of the Group at her home in St John's Wood. She was also the Secretary of the Studies Subcommittee (1908–1913) of the Society in which she heavily influenced the direction of its studies into working conditions for women. In 1912 she co-wrote with Helen Blagg a tract for the Society entitled Women and prisons. In 1911, according to Walter (2007, p. 227) she described the activities of the Fabian Women's Group. And, until 1916, when she resigned because of illness; she was its most active member.

== Publications ==
1880s

- "Women's labour in factories". Justice. 8 March 1884.
- "The condition of the Russian peasantry". Today. July and August. 1885.
- "The Family as a Type of Society". The Anarchist. April 1886.
- "Freedom" (PDF). Freedom. 1 (1 October): 1. June 1886.
- "Anarchism". Fabian Tract No. 4 What socialism is. London: George Standring. 1886. July 1886 (Note: This contribution was also published in Three essays on anarchism., see Wilson 1979.)
- "The principles and aims of anarchism". Present Day (July). 1886.
- "Education by force" (PDF). Freedom. 1: 1–2. November 1886.
- "Women's Labour" (PDF). Freedom. 1 (10): 2. July 1887.
- "The condemned anarchists". Commonweal. 12 November 1887.
- "The tragedy of Chicago" (PDF). Freedom. 2 (15): 59. December 1887.
- "The women of the commune" (PDF). Freedom. 2 (19): 75. April 1888.
- "Work" (PDF). Freedom. 2 (22): 85-86. July 1888.
- "The marriage controversy" (PDF). Freedom. 3 (25): 1-2. October 1888.
- "The revolt of the English workers in the nineteenth century". Freedom. April-September 1889.
- "What anarchist communism means". Freedom. August 1889.

1890s

- "Democracy or anarchism". Freedom. February 1890.
- "Anarchism and outrage". Freedom. December 1893. (Note: This article was reprinted in 1893 as "Freedom Pamphlets. No. 8." by C.M. Wilson, London, see Anarchism and outrage.)
- "Anarchism and homicidal outrage". What is anarchism?. 1893. (Note: Rooum 2016, p. 70 observed in a footnote to this article: "This article (signed 'The Freedom Group') though it is certain that Charlotte Wilson was the author) was published in 1893 in response to a declaration from the Spanish government." However, with the sole exception of the concluding paragraph, the article appears to be identical with the article "Anarchism and outrage" above, which was reprinted from the Decemeber [sic] 1893 issue of Freedom. Also, as will be seen from the above pdf, the date of the reprint is stated on its cover as "1893" and not "1909", as Rooum stated.)

1900s

- "A brief history of Freedom" (PDF). Freedom. XIV (153): 49-50. 1900.
- "Wyldes and its story". Transactions of the Hampstead Antiquarian and Historical Society. 1902-1903.
- "The economic disintegration of the family". Fabian News. July 1909.
- (With Helen Blagg) Women and prisons (Fabian Tract No. 163 ed.). London: The Fabian Society. 1912.

== Notes ==
Party political offices
Preceded by New position	Secretary of the Fabian Women's Group; 1909–1915	Succeeded by Ellen Smith
Media offices
Preceded by New position	Editor of Freedom; 1886–1895	Succeeded by Alfred Marsh
