= Luigi Basiletti =

Italian painter (1780–1859)

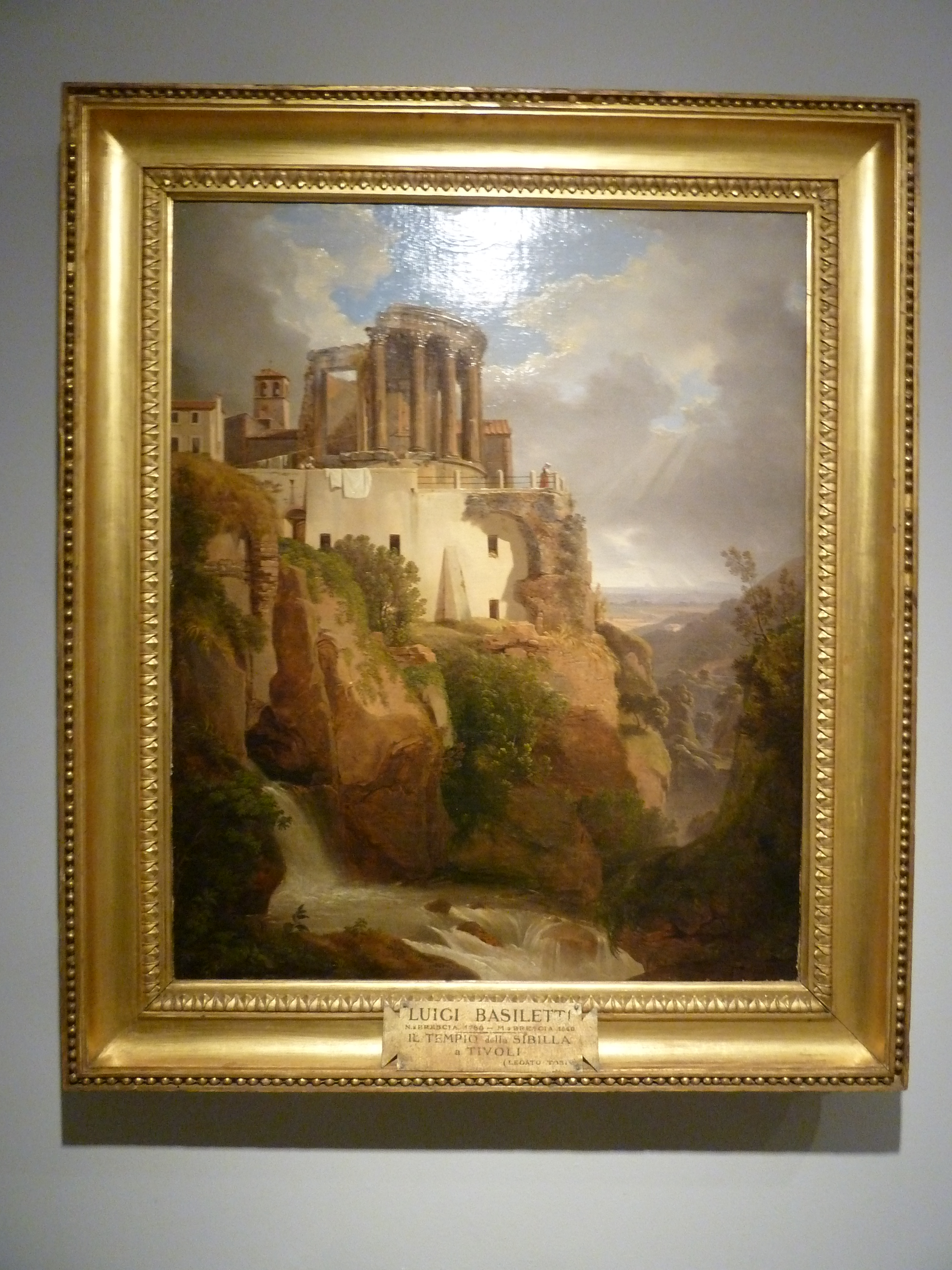
Luigi Basiletti, Il Tempio delle Sibilla a Tivoli

Luigi Basiletti (18 April 1780 – 25 January 1859) was an Italian painter, engraver, architect, and archeologist.

== Biography ==
He was born in Brescia. He was a pupil of Sante Cattaneo, then moved to Bologna, and in 1806 to Rome. He painted sacred subjects, mythology as well as landscapes.

He painted a Cascade at Tivoli for the Brera Academy at Milan. He is also represented by a Niobe and the landscapes Lago d’Iseo, Tempio di Sibilla, and Pozzuoli at the Galleria Tosio Martinengo in Brescia. Among other works are a Guardian Angel for the Duomo Vecchio of Brescia. He painted the Ferimento di Baiardo (1828) now in the Atheneum of Brescia. He painted frescoes for rooms in the Atheneum, and the Palazzo Martinengo.

He contributed to the architectural decoration of the cupola by Luigi Cagnola for the Duomo Nuovo of Brescia (1820) and with the architect Vita a design for the Mercato del Grano (1820–1823). He designed the entrance staircase to the parish church of Gussago. He formed part of an archeologic commission in 1823 established in Brescia. He became an associate of the Brescian Atheneum (1810) and censor (1816–1844) and was admitted as an associated of the Brera Academy (1828).

== Sources ==
- Bryan, Michael (1886). Robert Edmund Graves (ed.). Dictionary of Painters and Engravers, Biographical and Critical. Vol. I: A-K. London: George Bell and Sons. p. 91.
