= Domenico Vantini =

Italian painter (1765–1825)

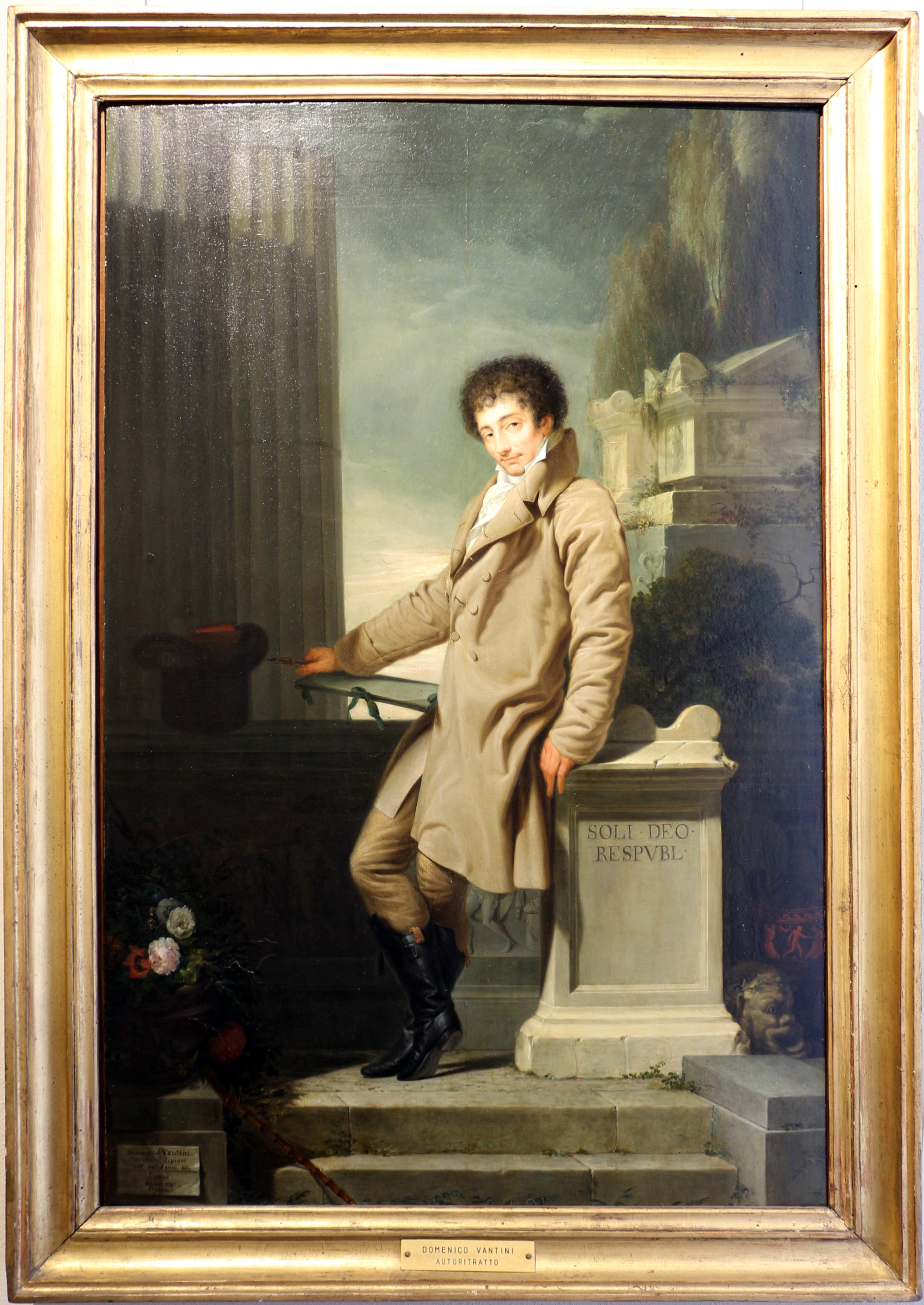
Selfportrait, 1814

Domenico Vantini (1765 – 22 June 1825) was an Italian painter of the Neoclassic period, mainly active in Brescia and Mantua.

Vantini was born and died in Brescia. He was first a pupil of Santo Cattaneo; he then moved to Mantua to work with Giuseppe Bottani. He specialized in miniature portraits.
