= Sante Cattaneo =

Italian painter (1739–1819)

Sante Cattaneo or Santo Cattaneo (8 August 1739 – 1819) was an Italian painter of the Neoclassic period, mainly active in Brescia.

He was also called Santino. He was born at Salò, Italy. His parents travelled away and consigned him at age three to thirteen to his aunt. He then moved to Brescia to live with his mother, who worked in wool looms. He at first practised wood-engraving, but afterwards studied painting under Antonio Dusi of Brescia and then, with Francesco Monti (Bologna). He studied in 1776 at the Accademia Clementina of Bologna. He settled at Brescia in 1773, and in 1810 became professor of drawing in the Art academy of that city. He died in Brescia. Among Cattaneo's pupils are Domenico Vantini, Luigi Basiletti, Antonio Manenti, and Carlo Frigerio. Professor Romualdo Turini of Salò was a pupil and his biographer.

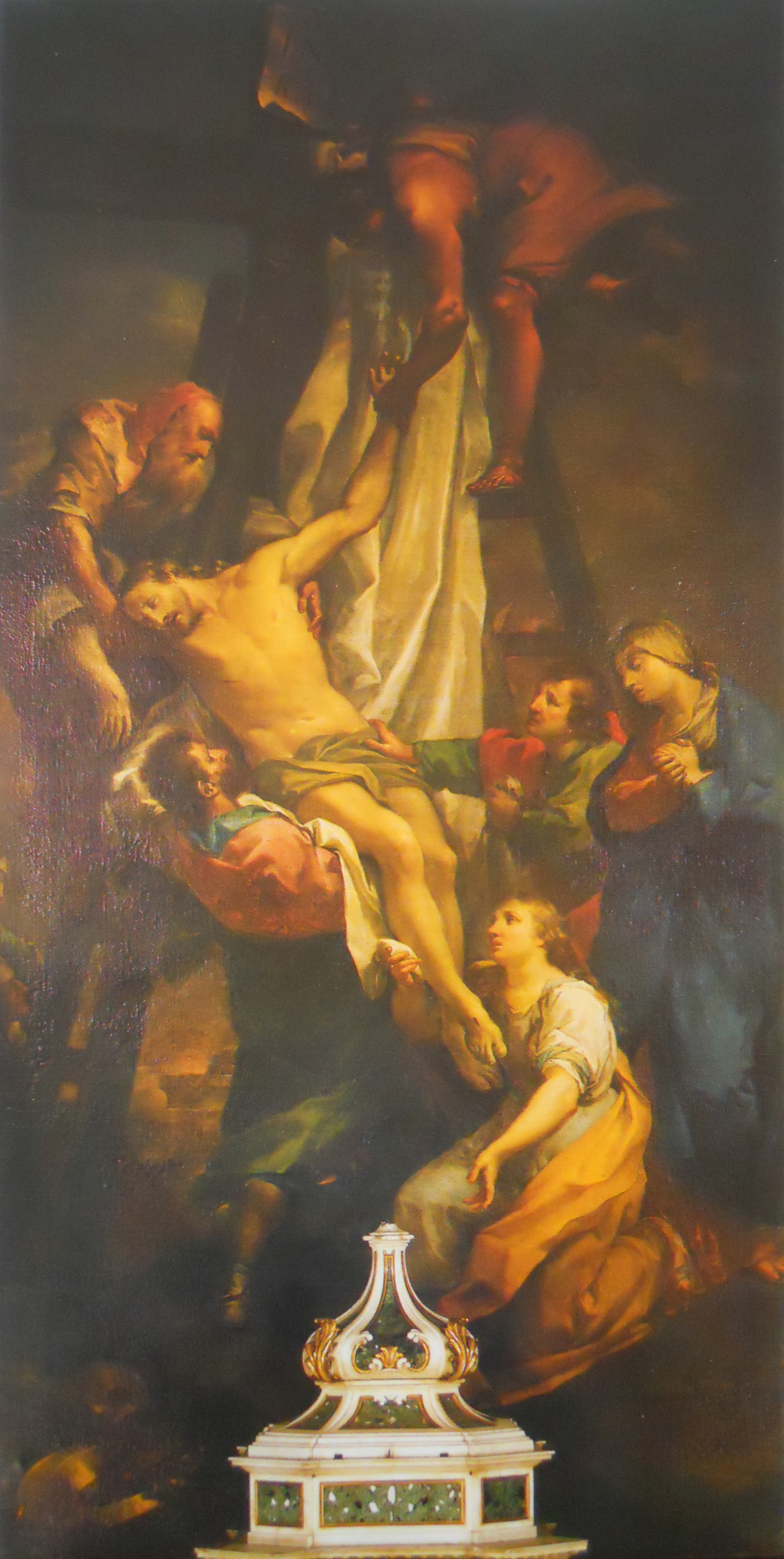
Deposition, Santi Faustino e Giovita.

== Works ==
- Altarpiece for the parish church of San Vincenzo Diacono in Calcinato.
- Crucifixion of Apostle Peter (1783) altarpiece in presbytery of the church of Santi Pietro e Paolo in Verolavecchia.
- Last Supper, canvas in church of San Sebastiano in Pavone.
- Martyrdoms of Saints Andrew and Flavianus for parish church of Sant'Andrea in Pralboino.
- Assumption of the Virgin with Saints Peter and Imerius, altarpiece for parish church of Santi Pietro e Paolo in Offlaga.
- La Riviera thanks the provveditore Marco Soranzo, (1786) for palazzo comunale di Salò
- Deposition (1808), church of Santi Faustino e Giovita, Brescia.
- Madonna and child with Saints Catherine and Angela Merici, (after 1815) for church of Santa Maria degli Angeli, Brescia.
- Saints Benedict and Scolastica, Jesus distributes Eucharist and other frescos for Sant'Afra, Brescia.
- Visitation of Mary to St Elisabeth, church of Santa Maria ad Elisabetta, Brescia.
