= Pallata Tower, Brescia =

Coordinates: 45°32′26″N 10°12′57″E

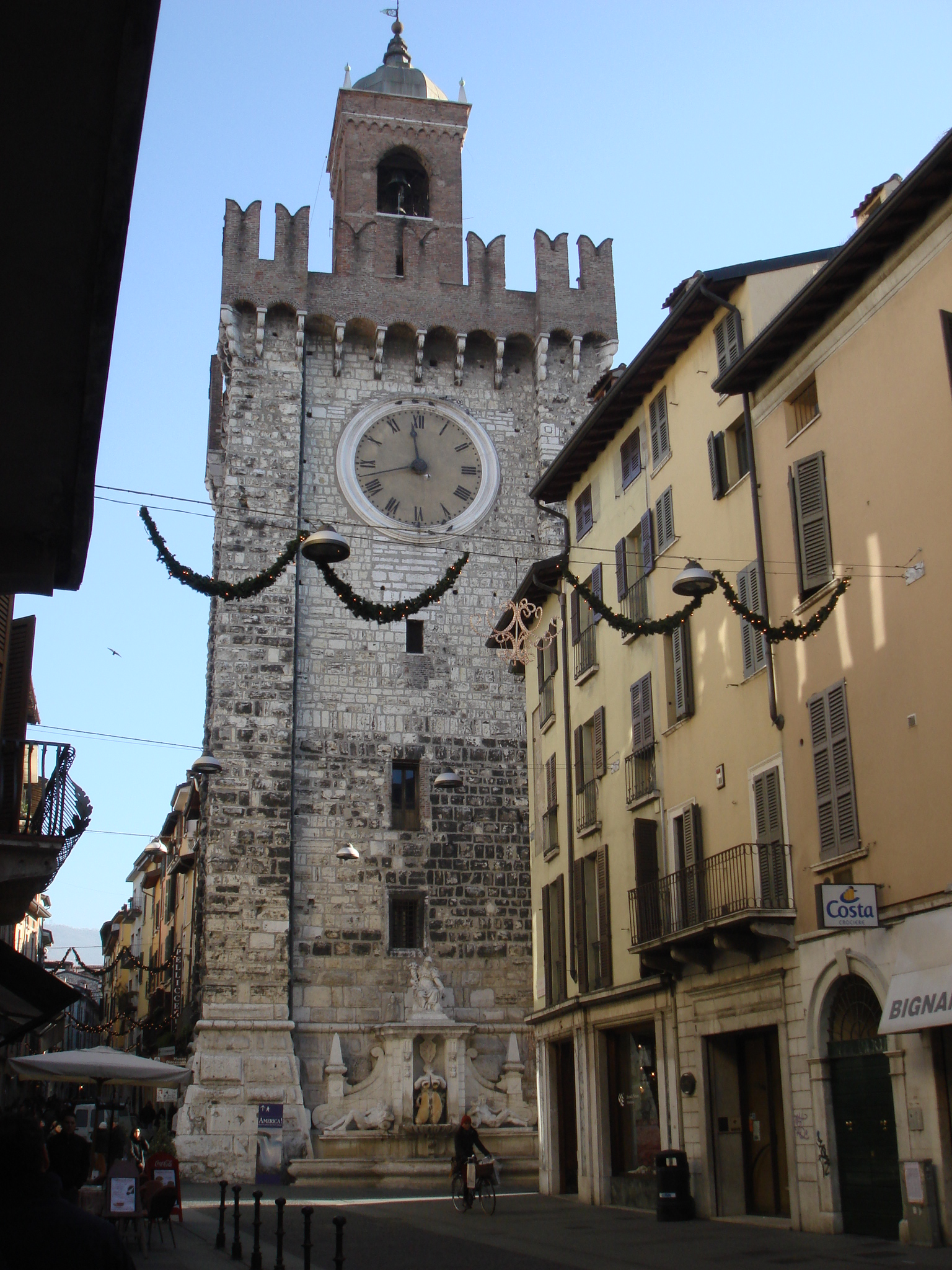

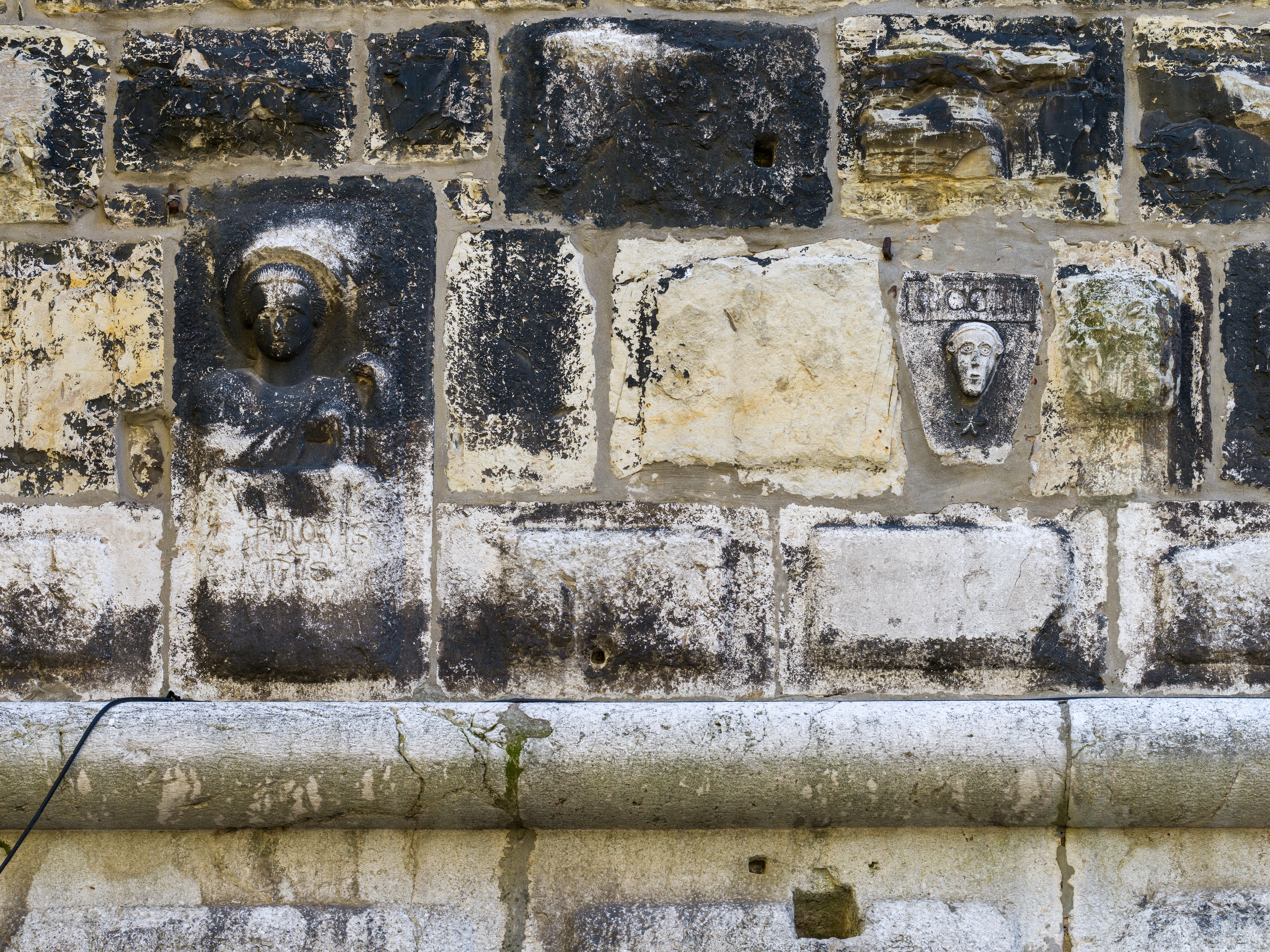
Reliefs of bust of Saint and human face with flower and date MCCLII (A.D. 1253) on the northern facade of the tower.

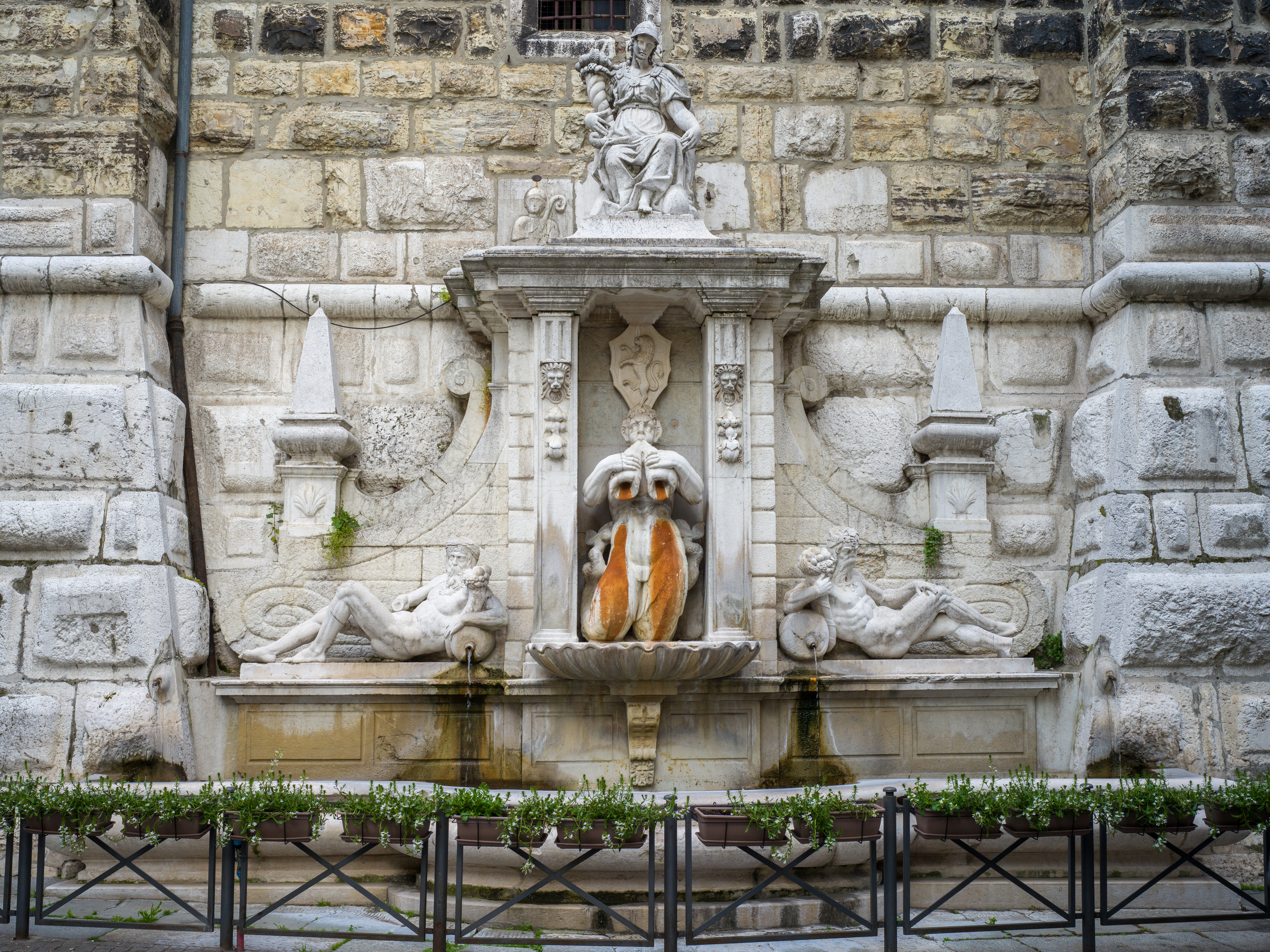
Monumental fountain at the western bottom of the tower.

The Pallata Tower, known simply as the Pallata or Torre della Pallata, is a 32-metre-high (105 ft) 13th-century tower located on Corso Giuseppe Garibaldi in the center of Brescia, region of Lombardy, Italy.

== History ==
It was initially built as a bastion that was part of the medieval walls of the city. There are two theories about the name pallata: it may be derived from palizzata, the Italian word for a palisade, or it may derive from the name of Pallas Athena, with the stones perhaps having been purloined from a temple of that goddess.

Construction began in 1254, in the city quarter of San Giovanni. It was associated with a medieval gate, the Porta di San Giovanni, in the early walls of the city. The tower once held the vaults of a bank or Monte di Pieta. Over the centuries, decorations were added, such as a clock in 1461 and merlons and a small tower at the top between 1476 and 1481. In 1597, the west side of the tower had the addition of a fountain, built in Mannerist style. The fountain was based on a design and iconography by Pier Maria Bagnadore and built by the architect Antonio Carra, and the statuary was completed by the sculptor Valentino Bonesini. The fountain has four allegoric statues, with the lower register representing either the two rivers in Brescia, the Mella and the Garza, or the two lakes in the province, Garda and Iseo.
