= George Barrett (anarchist) =

English anarchist (1888–1917)

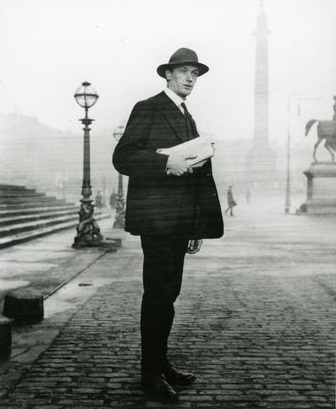
- Born: George Powell Ballard; 6 December 1888; Ledbury, Herefordshire, England
- Died: 7 January 1917 (aged 28); Torquay, Devon, England
- Education: Hereford Cathedral School
- Occupations: Draughtsman; Journalist; Writer
- Spouse: Edith Florence Oxley (m. 1910)

George Powell Ballard (6 December 1888 – 7 January 1917), known by his pen name George Barrett, was an English anarchist writer, public speaker, newspaper editor, and journalist.

== Biography ==
Barrett was born George Powell Ballard on 6 December 1888 to a middle-class family in Ledbury, Herefordshire. He attended Hereford Cathedral School before becoming an engineering draughtsman. He also worked as a journalist.

Barrett joined the Bristol Socialist Society, later giving a controversial lecture titled 'Anarchy and Socialism', before leaving the society on account of his opposition to parliamentary tactics. In 1910 he married Edith Oxley. Barrett then moved to London and joined the Walthamstow Anarchist Group and began regular public speaking on an anarchist platform. In 1910 he also began contributing to the anarchist paper Freedom.

In 1911, he was offered editorship of Freedom, but on reflection declined the position. Barrett moved to Glasgow where he joined and spoke for the Glasgow Anarchist Group. During the crackdown on anarchists following the Siege of Sidney Street in 1911 police visited Barrett's workplace, resulting in him losing his job. He was blacklisted, so turned to freelance technical journalism for the engineering press.

In 1912, he began editing a new weekly paper, The Anarchist, with financial support from George Davison. Barrett struggled to keep the paper going, and ceased publication after 34 issues. Barrett also carried out several speaking tours of England and Scotland to promote the paper. In May 1913 he contracted tuberculosis, an illness he struggled with for the rest of his life. He launched a new anarcho-syndicalist paper, The Voice of Labour, which lasted from 1914 to 1916.

In 1915, Barrett was a signatory of the "International Anarchist Manifesto on the War" issued in response to the Manifesto of the Sixteen, a document signed by Peter Kropotkin and others calling for an allied victory in the First World War.

Barrett died from tuberculosis on 7 January 1917 in Torquay, Devon, at the age of 28.

== Works ==
In 1915, the Workers' Freedom Group in Bristol published the pamphlet The Last War, in which Barrett argued that the only war the working class should wage is class war. After selling some 10,000 copies, the pamphlet was suppressed by the government. The same year Freedom Press published the pamphlet The Anarchist Revolution. In 1921, Freedom Press posthumously serialised and then published the pamphlet Objections to Anarchism. The pamphlet was a response to 24 common objections given to anarchists.

In 1963, a collection of Barrett's writings was published by Freedom Press, titled The First Person, and edited by Sidney E. Parker. In 1990, Pirate Press published Barrett's three pamphlets under the title The Last War. In 2019, Freedom Press published a larger collection, titled Our Masters Are Helpless, edited by Iain McKay.

== Bibliography ==
- Balaji, Ridhiman (Winter 2021). "Our Masters Are Helpless". Anarcho-Syndicalist Review. No. 81. Champaign, IL. p. 36. ISSN 1069-1995. ProQuest 2458775686.
- Becker, Heiner (1987). "Notes on Freedom and the Freedom Press, 1886–1928" (PDF). The Raven 1. Vol. 1, no. 1. London: Freedom Press. pp. 19–20. ISSN 0951-4066 – via libcom.org.
- Flaherty, Seamus (Autumn–Winter 2023). "Our Masters are Helpless: The Essays of George Barrett". Anarchist Studies. 31 (2). Lawrence & Wishart: 118–120. ISSN 0967-3393.
- McKay, Iain (2019). "George Barrett: A Biographical Sketch". Our Masters are Helpless: The Essays of George Barrett. London: Freedom Press. pp. 3–8. ISBN 978-1-904491-32-3.
- Parker, S. E. (October–December 1990). "George Barrett – A Biographical Note" (PDF). The Raven 12. Vol. 3, no. 4. London: Freedom Press. pp. 335–338. ISSN 0951-4066 – via libcom.org.
- Pateman, Barry (January 2020). "Our Masters Are Helpless: The Essays of George Barrett edited by Iain McKay [book review]". KSL: Bulletin of the Kate Sharpley Library. No. 100–101. Kate Sharpley Library. p. 13. ISSN 1475-0309.
