= Romoaldo Turini =

Italian painter (1752–1829)

Romoaldo or Romualdo Turini (1752 – 1829) was an Italian painter of the Neoclassic period, mainly active in his native Salò and Brescia, both of which were in the Republic of Venice until he was in his 40s.

He was born to a father who was a local printer. Locally, Turini trained under Santo Cattaneo, and ultimately became the latter's biographer. But as a young man, he went to live with his maternal uncle, Ferdinando Bertoni, a well known musician and musical teacher in Venice. There he attended the Academy of Fine Arts. here, he met Antonio Canova, who remained a close friend for life. In 1797, he returned to his hometown. He taught design at the local gymnasium in Salò. In Brescia, he was commissioned to paint some mythologic frescoes for the casa Odassi and the home of the lawyer Zuliani.
