= Carlo Frigerio =

Italian painter (1763–1800)

Carlo Frigerio (5 April 1763 – 5 December 1800) was an Italian painter, and a pupil of Santo Cattaneo. He was mainly active in Brescia.

Along with Santo Cattaneo and other artists, he contributed decorations and frescos to the Cigola-Fenaroli Mansion, located between Via Carlo Cattaneo and Piazza Tebaldo Brusato in Brescia; the building was erected in the 16th and 17th centuries by the Cigola Counts of Muslone.

Federico Nicoli Cristiani wrote of Frigerio in 1807, "He had a beautiful hope to succeed in art, but death claimed him."
