= Piermaria Bagnadore =

Italian painter

- Born: 1550; Orzinuovi, Italy
- Died: 1627 (aged 76–77); Brescia, Italy
- Other name: Pier Maria or Pietro Maria Bagnatore or Bagnatori
- Occupations: Painter, sculptor, and architect

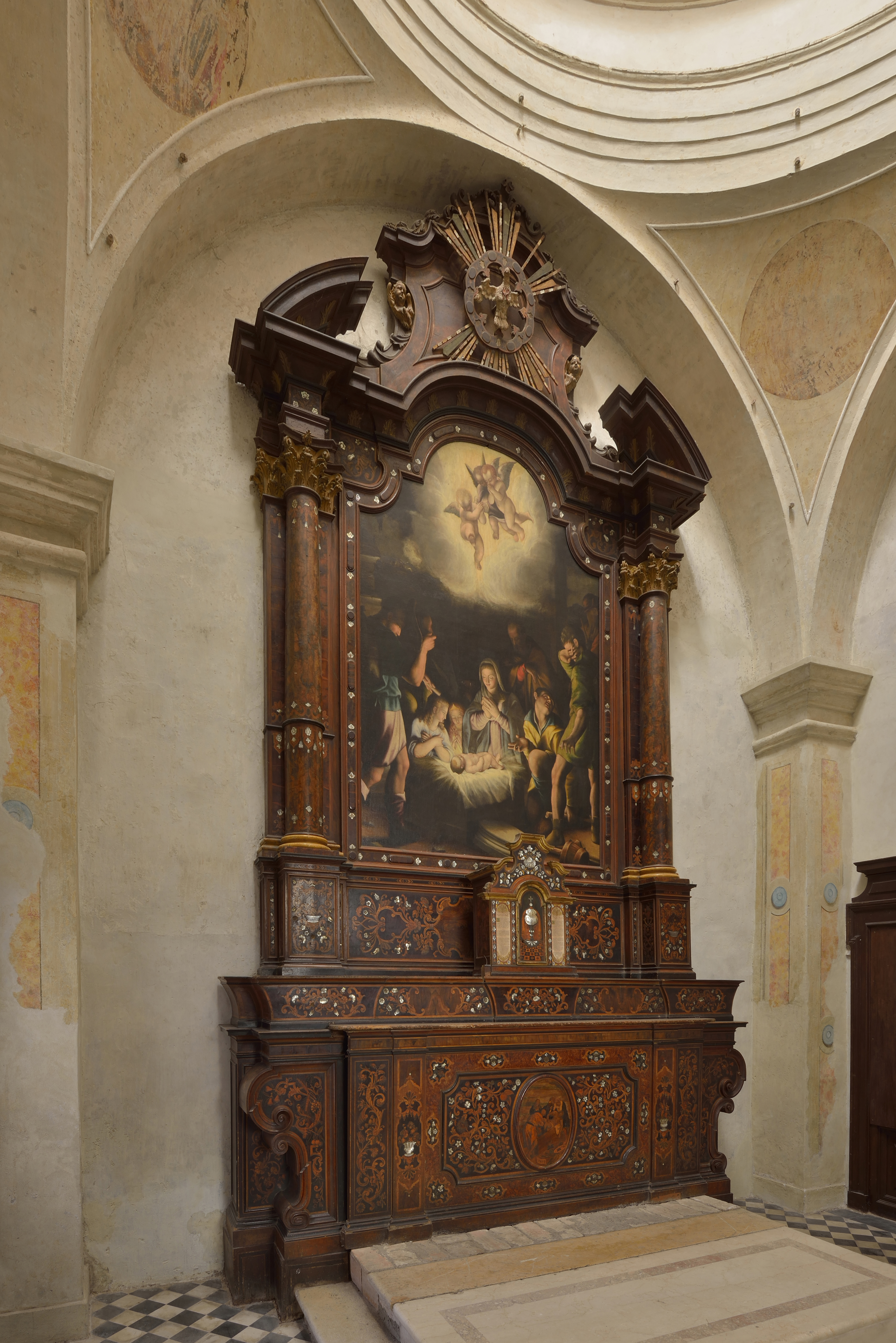
Nativity by Pier Maria Bagnadorein the Santo Corpo di Cristo Monastery church in Brescia

Piermaria Bagnadore (c. 1550–1627), also called Pietro Maria Bagnatori, was an Italian painter, sculptor, and architect of the late-Renaissance period.

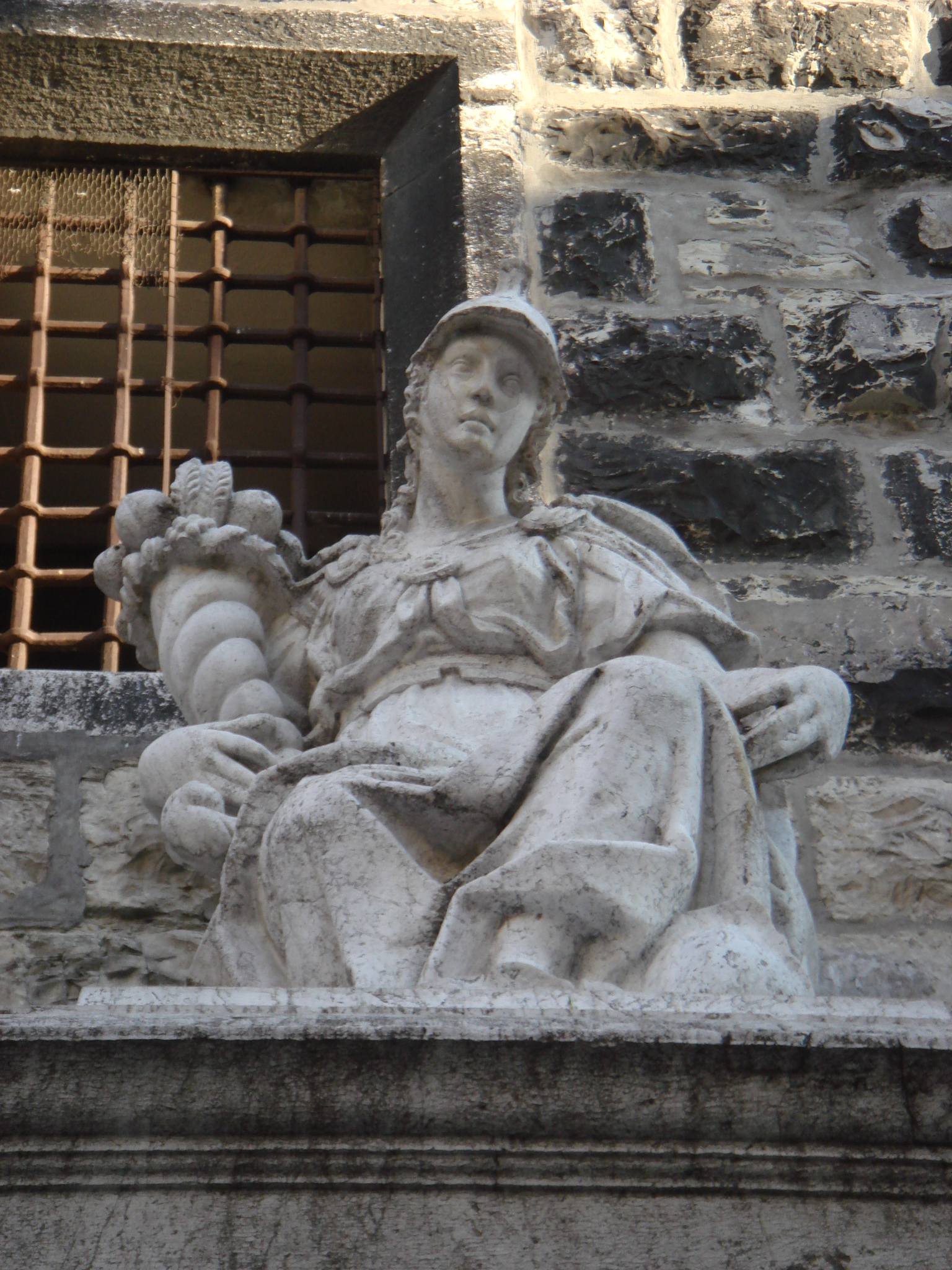
Pier Maria Bagnadore design, Fountain della Pallata Tower, detail of allegory of the city of Brescia with arms and cornucopia, 1596.

== Biography ==
Born in Orzinuovi, he trained with il Moretto da Brescia, and painted mainly in Brescia from the late 16th century until the 1610s.

Bagnadore spent most of his career in Brescia. He helped direct the sculptural decoration of the Duomo Nuovo between 1604 and 1611 and sculpted the Mannerist style fountain at the base of the Torre della Palata, with collaborations from Antonio Carra and Valentino Bonesini. Among his other works is the design of the Church of the Madonna del Lino during 1604–1609. He also participated in the reconstruction of the church of San Domenico (1611) and the church of Sant'Angela Merici.

Bagnadore also assisted in designing the bell-tower of the church of San Giuseppe, the monumental portico in via Dieci Giornate as well as the Zanardelli at Piazza dell Loggia. He was also involved in planning the enlargement of the church of Santissimo Corpo di Cristo (1620).

Equally famous for his paintings, Bagnadore's works include the Birth of Jesus for the church of San Carlo, and Adoration of Shepherds over the lateral portal of the church of Santa Maria delle Grazie, along with a St Anne and young John the Baptist and an altarpiece depicting the Immaculate Conception; and a Dead Christ for the nave of Sant'Angela Merici.

His work was noted by the biographer Luigi Lanzi and his extensive print collection passed into the hands of Camillo II Gonzaga, Count of Novellara.
