= Piermaria Porettano =

Italian painter

Piermaria Porettano (active 1600) was an Italian painter of Bologna, who trained with Ludovico Carracci.
