= Antonio Dusi =

Italian painter

Altarpiece of Antonio Dusi in Brescia.

Antonio Dusi was an Italian painter of the Baroque period, mainly active in Brescia. He was initially a pupil of Antonio Paglia. One of his pupils was Santo Cattaneo.
