= The Anarchist (newspaper) =

Newspaper in London, England (1885-1888)

- "Abolish the State"
- Type: Monthly newspaper
- Editor: Henry Seymour; The English Anarchist Circle; Henry Seymour
- Founded: March 1885
- Ceased publication: 1888
- Political alignment: Individualist anarchism Anarchist communism Individualist anarchism
- Language: English
- Headquarters: 35 Newington Green Road
- City: London
- Country: United Kingdom
- OCLC number: 832285859

The Anarchist was a monthly newspaper produced in London, England, between 1885 and 1888. It is notable for being the first English-language Anarchist periodical in Britain. The newspaper was conceived in the early 1980s by Henry Seymour, a printer and publisher, and a former secularist, who had converted to anarchism while he was living in Tunbridge Wells, Kent in South East England. In 1885 Seymour moved to Islington in London, where he set himself up as a printer and publisher and where he became the editor of the The Anarchist.

== The origin of the idea of an anarchist newspaper ==
While Seymour was living in Tunbridge Wells, he happened to meet two travelling Americans, Willard K. Dyer and Sarah E. Holmes, who were associated with Liberty, an American anarchist periodical which was edited by Benjamin Tucker and published in Boston, Massachusetts, which "proved a seminal and productive influence on him." Woodcock and Avakumoović (1990) claimed that Seymour "published from Tunbridge Wells in 1883 the first English translation of Bakunin's God and the State ...." (Note: In contrast, Avrich (1979) credited Tucker with having published God and the State in Boston in 1883. He observed: "The original French edition appeared in 1882, with a preface by two of Bakunin's most devoted disciples, Carlo Cafiero and Elisée Reclus. Tucker began selling it (at twenty cents a copy) as soon as he received a shipment from Geneva. Scarcely a year later, in September 1883, he published his English translation, including the Cafiero and Reclus preface." (Avrich 1979).) And he read Tucker on Proudon (Note: McKay (2011) observed that Tucker "translated substantial material by Proudhon into English including numerous articles, What is Property? and volume one of System of Economic Contradictions. In 1881, he proclaimed that his new journal, Liberty, was “brought into existence as a direct consequence of the teachings of Proudhon” and lives principally to emphasise and spread them.” (McKay 2011, p. 45).). Tucker was an individualist anarchist, which Seymour also became.

== The launch of The Anarchist ==
In 1885 Seymour moved to a terraced house in Newington Green Road, Islington where he set himself up as a printer and publisher, this time under the alternative names of the International Publishing Company and H. Seymour. (Note: Seymour (1933-1937) later documented this period in his life in (Seymour 1937, pp. 120–121).) While there he became a Fabian and met fellow Fabian Charlotte Wilson, and told her of his plan to publish The Anarchist, to which she responded by promising to contribute articles to it under the name of An English Anarchist. (Note: Wilson had previously used the pen name twice in the November 1844 issue of Justice, the weekly newspaper of the Social Democratic Federation. (Quail 2019, p. 67).) (Note: Walter (2007) documented that Wilson also contributed money to the newspaper for more than a year. (Walter 2007, p. 223).) Seymour said that The Anarchist "would not go in for the 'Revolutionary tactics of Continental papers generally' but would expound anarchist philosophy and aims." Seymour was its editor by default. He stated in the editorial for the first issue in March that it "was a journal of 'anti-political Socialism', with a mission to advocate the abolition of the state and to proclaim the sovereignty of the individual, including the right of private judgement in morals." Issue 1 contained greetings from Élisée Reclus and the French-speaking International anarchist circle of London, and:

- a report on the thousands of unemployed who were parading the streets in London
- an article by the French anarchist Élisée Reclus
- the article What’s in a name? (How an anarchist might put it) by George Bernard Shaw (Note: Reprinted in the 11 April 1885 issue of Liberty and in 1988, see Shaw 1988.), which he wrote at the request of Wilson (Note: Wilson opined that Shaw "had picked out some things that really needed saying in a first number." (Oliver 1983, p. 34) However, Shaw was embarrassed by unauthorised reprints of his article. (Oliver 1983, p. 35) He was not and did not become an anarchist. And, as he wrote in a letter to Seymour, he wrote the article "more to shew Mrs Wilson my opinion of the line an anarchist paper should take in England than as an expression of my own opinions" (Walter 2007, p. 222).)
- the Lyon Trial manifesto (Note: Anarchism 1883 Declaration to the Tribunal of Lyons by the Accused Anarchists.).

== Subsequent issues ==
=== 1885 ===
Issue 2 of the newspaper in April 1885 included "a note on the exposure of Serreaux, the spy who had attended the 1881 congress, in the Souvenirs of his boss, the Paris police chief Andrieux, were also mentioned [in the previous issue] by Mrs Wilson." Issue 3 in May 1885 "announced that 'a circle of English Anarchists' was about to be formed in London." (Note: The "circle of English Anarchists" was the "English Anarchist Circle", which Wilson and Seymour formed "to discuss theory, coordinate propaganda, and establish an Anarchist Organisation Fund, so as to be financially 'able to meet any emergency.'" (Hinely 1987, pp. 185, 474). Quail (2019, originally 1978) observed: "By July the 'English Anarchists' were meeting more or less monthly" and that Charlotte Wilson was probably a member. (Quail 2019, p. 67).) The October issue included Seymour's Anarchist Manifesto.

=== 1886 ===
Issue 11 in January 1886 included the subtitle A Revolutionary Review and included an article on the Russian anarchist Mikhail Bakunin. a critical meeting of the English Anarchist Circle was held in the house of Sergei Stepniak, known in England as Sergius Stepniak in Alma Square, St John's Wood (Note: Hinely (1987) stated that the meeting was held in Stepniak's house in Newington Green Road. However, Seymour was living in Newington Green Road, not Stepniak.), North London, where he was joined by two other Russian exiles, Nikolai Tchaikovsky and Peter Kropotkin (who was temporarily living there with his wife), Dr Saverio Merlino, Dr John Burns-Gibson and Seymour. Seymour had written to Kropotkin while he was in Clairvaux in France offering him the hospitality of his newspeper. (Note: Woodcock and Avakumoović (1990) commented that Seymour's offer did "not appear to have been wholly disinterested, since Seymour was in difficulties and the funds which the Freedom Group already possessed enabled them to contribute towards his costs. (Woodcock & Avakumoović 1990, p. 205).) However, as he much later recalled to Joseph Ishill, who was associated with Liberty in Boston:

"I was induced to stifle myself and my individualist tendencies and be incorporated in a 'conjoint editorship' of future issues of The Anarchist. There were to be four others, including Kropotkine, Dr. Merlino, Tchaykovsky, and Mrs Wilson, all of whom were 'Anarchist Communists.'" (Emphases in the original)

Issue 13 in late March included the announcement that Kropotkin was now in London and that the paper had become the "recognised organ of the English Anarchist Party"' and the article Anarchism: Communistic and Mutualistic by the Italian anarchist Francesco Saverio Merlino, which argued that "as production was inherently co-operative the products of labour were indivisible and therefore necessarily collective". Seymour wrote a short response to the article.

Issue 14 in April displayed the banner Communist and Revolutionary and included the declaration by Seymour: "In accepting the economic principles of Communism as satisfactorly established, I unhesitatingly and fearlessly adopt them." Also, henceforth articles in the newspaper were to be unsigned and it was to be edited collectively, which provisionally comprised "Kropotkin, Chaikovsky (Nikolai Tchaikovsky), Merlino, 'Dr Gibson' (Dr J. Burns-Gibson), and Mrs Wilson". In its 1 May 1886 issue, Commonweal, the British socialist newspaper, commended The Anarchist on its adoption of anarchist communism: "Comrade Seymour acknowledging in manly fashion the untenability of his former individualist viewpoint." However, Seymour later recalled that he felt that he had "become the 'goat,' having to do all the drudgery of production, supply most of the cost, while the others were content to write, excellently and otherwise." (Emphasis in the original) Also Seymour strongly objected to "The family as a type of society", a critque of patriarchal society by Wilson which was published as the lead article of the issue.

Issue 16 in June included a condemnation of those who "never build any sort of nest for themselves, but appropriate the nests built by others" and informed its readers "that only Seymour had the authority to receive money for the newspaper." Hinely (1987) observed: {{blockquote|From this point, Seymour was on the defensive in his effort to keep himself and the individualist school in the mainstream of English anarchists politics. Rumors began immediately that The Anarchist was doomed, and the leading French anarchist paper Le Révolté expressed the "hope that a new Anarchist journal will be started", which the newspaper included in its issue of 1 June 1886.

Ryley (2013) attributed the turnaround of Seymour's political allegience in March 1886 to his financial concerns: it "was not a meeting of minds." Consequently, the turnaround wasn't wholehearted: Seymour didn't fully convert to what he called "communist anarchism". And in Issue 17 in July the split between Seymour and the other editors seems to have entered the public domain with the "barbed comments" that he inserted about Wilson.

In Issue 18 in August, Seymour included an article by barrister and individual anarchist Wordsworth Donisthorpe, which reafirmed his allegiance to individual anarchism. The issue also published a paper that individualist anarchist Wordsworth Donisthorpe had given on the utilisation of land to the Fabian conference.

Oliver (1983) observed: "The Anarchist continued until the end of 1886" and that the last issue contained an article by American Lothrop Withington about the Charles Dilke divorce case (aka The Crawford Scandal) and noted a lecture that Touzeau Parris (Note: Parris, Touzeau, 1839-1907, by Heath.) about socialism from an anarchist perspective.

=== 1887-1888 ===
Ryley (2013: 112) documented and Brandeis Library documents that Issue 25 was published in March 1887 (Note: Brandeis Library. Seymour, H., & Gale. (1885). The Anarchist. H. Seymour..). A new series was started in April, Volume 1, No. 1. (Note: Brandeis Library. Seymour, H., & Gale. (1885). The Anarchist. H. Seymour..) This series was followed by Volume 2 in 1888, of which only two issues are known to have been published. The first issue was No. 3, which was published in March and which contained the following announcement by Seymour:

"The fact of contradicting oneself is evidence of intellectual growth ... It is true I embraced Communist Anarchism some two years ago for a sufficient length of time to understand and repudiate it." (Ryley 2013, p. 91).

This was in turn followed on the 1st of August 1888 (Volume 2, No. 6), which might have been the final issue. (Note: Brandeis Library. Seymour, H., & Gale. (1885). The Anarchist. H. Seymour..) The newspaper closed in the September, when Seymour's landlord claimed arrears of rent from him.

== The aftermath ==
Hinely (1987) opined that, after 1886, the newspaper "limped along for another two years", having been "thoroughly eclipsed by Freedom". This didn't deter Seymour, who in 1889 started a new journal, the Revolutionary Review, which was similar to The Anarchist. But, by the 1890s, he had become bankrupt and became a "peaceful individualist".

== Archive ==
Journal The Anarchist Seymour, Henry.; Gale (Firm) 1885-1888
