= Henry Seymour (political activist) =

English political activist (1860–1938)

- Born: Henry Albert Seymour; 28 January 1860; Hayes, Bromley, England
- Died: 28 January 1938 (aged 78); Islington, England
- Known for: Publishing The Anarchist and introducing the Edison disc into the United Kingdom
- Spouse: Clara Elizabeth Spice (m. 1880; died 1934)

Henry Albert Seymour (28 January 1860 – 3 February 1938) was born in Hayes, Bromley, in Kent, England. He was a printer and publisher, and a secularist in Tunbridge Wells. In 1885 he moved to London, where he was also a printer and a publisher, and an author. However he rejected secularism upon becoming converted to individualist anarchism. Also he became a gramophone innovator, a survey author and a Baconian. In 1885 he published the The Anarchist (newspaper), the first English language anarchist periodical in Britain. He is credited with having introduced the Edison disc into the country in 1913.

== Biography ==
Seymour was born in Hayes, Bromley, England on 28 January 1860. He married Clara Elizabeth Spice on 2 November 1880. He first came to prominence in 1882, while living in Tunbridge Wells, Kent. He was appointed the secretary of the Tunbridge Wells Secular Society and he was convicted in summer 1882, of blasphemy. In 1883, he published the first English translation of Mikhail Bakunin's book God and the State, under the name of the Science Library. While living in Tunbridge Wells, Seymour began work on his projected periodical, The Anarchist, the first English-language individualist anarchist periodical in Britain.

In 1885, Seymour moved to a house in Islington, London where he set himself up as a printer and publisher, this time under the alternative names of the International Publishing Company and H. Seymour. In the same year he returned to his work on The Anarchist. In 1886 he published The Manifesto of the Communists by Karl Marx. In the following year he began to publish his own works. Then, in quick succession, he published series of pamphlets by Pierre-Joseph Proudhon, Mikhail Bakunin, Peter Kropotkin, Élisée Reclus, Lysander Spooner and W.B. Green. (Note: Shpayer (1981) documented that a full list of the pamphlets was published in the September 1886 issue of The Anarchist. (Shpayer 1981, p. 24).)

The Anarchist was produced until 1888 and was briefly co-edited by Peter Kropotkin and Charlotte Wilson, both of whom went on to form Freedom following disagreements between them and Seymour.

As well as producing The Anarchist, Seymour published a wide range of pamphlets and tracts, and he printed handbills for other groups, including the Tunbridge Wells branch of the SDF.

Seymour is important in the history of British anarchism, particularly Individualist anarchism, a branch of anarchism which has dwindled in influence in Britain since the early 20th century. Seymour published a wide range of works on anarchist subjects. He was involved in the late 19th century radical community in London and it seems likely that Seymour printed material for many individuals and groups.

Seymour was involved in many groups and causes during the latter 1900s. He was a founding member of Free Currency Propaganda and produced a pamphlet called The Monomaniacs: A Fable in Finance.

Seymour took over editorship of The Adult: A Journal for the Advancement of freedom in Sexual Relationships, following the arrest of George Bedborough, the previous editor.

In the early 20th century, Seymour became involved in the nascent gramophone industry. He introduced Edison's phonograph to Britain in 1913, and wrote about it in Sound Wave magazine. He wrote The Reproduction of Sound in 1917, described as "acknowledged as the standard work on the subject" in the industry at the time. He produced a gramophone called the Superphone and was responsible for many innovations in gramophone technology. Seymour was key in the development of EMG Gramophones and produced parts for the early production models.

In his later life, Seymour became involved in the Francis Bacon Society, and was the editor of the society's journal, Baconiana. His wife died in 1934. He died in Islington, on 3 February 1938, at the age of 78.

== Publications ==
1880s

- 1887. P. J. Proudhon A biographical sketch. London: The International Publishing Company. (Note: Originally published in The Anarchist.)
- 1888. Michael Bakounine: A Biographical Sketch. London: H. Seymour. 1888.
- 1888. Anarchy: Theory & Practice (PDF). London: H. Seymour.
- 1888. The Anarchy of Love: or the Science of the Sexes. London: H. Seymour.
- 1888. The philosophy of anarchism.
- 1889. An Examination of the Malthusian Theory. London: H. Seymour.
- 1894. The Two Anarchisms. London: Proudhon Press.
- 1895. The Monomaniacs: A Fable in Finance (reprinted from London Liberty). London: W. Reeves.
- 1897. The Fallacy of Marx's Theory of Surplus-Value. London: Murdoch & Co.
- 1898 "A Battle for Freedom". Free Society. 37: 1-2.
- 1898 (Editor) The Adult An unconventional journal. London. Publisher: Henry Seymour.
- 1898. The Physiology of Love: A Study in Stirpiculture, etc. London: L.N. Fowler & Co.

1900s

- 1918. The Reproduction of Sound. Being a description of the mechanical appliances and technical processes employed in the art. London: W. B. Tattersall.
- 1919. Bulletin of the Public Library of the City of Boston. 4. Vol. Two. Boston Public Library Trustees. p. 391.
- 1937 Ishill, Joseph (ed.). "The Genesis of Anarchism in England. A few Recollections of my Early Life in that Movement". Free Vistas An anthology of life & letters. Berkeley Heights, N.J.: Oriole Press.
