= François Le Levé =

French resistance member

François Le Levé (1882–1945), was born in Locmiquélic, Morbihan. Militant anarcho-syndicalist. Le Levé was one of fifteen anarchists who signed The Manifesto of the Sixteen, along with Peter Kropotkin, Jean Grave and others, favoring the Allies during World War I. A member of the French Resistance during World War II, Le Leve was captured and interned. He died while traveling home after being liberated.

== Bibliography ==
- Bantman, Constance; Berry, David (2017). "The French anarchist movement and the First World War". Anarchism, 1914–18: Internationalism, anti-militarism and war. Manchester University Press. doi:10.7765/9781526115768.00015. ISBN 9781526115768.
- Maitron, Jean; Geslin, Claude; Dupuy, Rolf (7 October 2024) [29 April 2014]. "LE LEVÉ François [Jean, dit]". Dictionnaire des anarchistes (in French). Éditions de l'Atelier. ISBN 9782708242685.
