= Harry Kelly (anarchist) =

American anarchist and lifelong activist

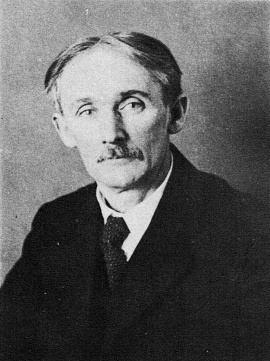
- Kelly in 1922
- Born: Harry May Kelly; 1871; Saint Charles, Missouri, US
- Died: 1953 (aged 81–82); New Rochelle, New York, US
- Resting place: Forest Home Cemetery; 41.869767°N 87.819807°W
- Movement: Anarchism/Modern School movement

Harry May Kelly (1871–1953) was an American anarchist and lifelong activist in the Modern School movement.

== Biography ==
=== Early life and work ===
Born in a thirteen-room house in Saint Charles, Missouri and christened in the local Episcopal church, Kelly spent his youth on the banks of the Mississippi. His father was Cornish, while his mother was a descendant of the Calvert family, founders of the city of Baltimore. Once a partner of railroad magnate Thomas Alexander Scott, Kelly's father had lost his stake and took a job as a mine inspector, dying in poverty before Kelly's fifth birthday. Kelly left school after the fifth grade and worked as a pressman in printing companies in order to support his family. At twenty years old, he was wandering from city to city. He was hired as a salesman of printing equipment by the American Machine and Foundry Company of Cleveland, Ohio. It was during this time he became actively engaged in the trade union movement and was first exposed to anarchist ideas. He became a collaborator of Charles Mowbray on Boston's The Rebel, and when that ceased publication, published a paper called The Match, the first of three anarchist periodicals he founded in America. Kelly's contemporary Hippolyte Havel would later comment that "The Match went out all too suddenly, but while it burned it gave Kelly great pleasure and satisfaction."

=== Years in England ===
Kelly is one of the living Anarchists who contribute real thought to the movement, a man who can state his theory of society in scientific, logical and precise manner and in convincing language.

— Max Nettlau

Scholar Lawrence Veysey observed that Kelly shared with his father "at least two major traits—a migratory restlessness and a certain interest in books and ideas". Kelly moved to England in 1898, partly to meet his father's relatives, but also to engage with London's renowned circle of anarchist revolutionaries, a prospect which he had looked forward to with impatience. It was there, among newfound friends and comrades, anarchist thinkers and propagandists, that Kelly spent his happiest days, and in the words of Havel "fortified his ideal with historical, economical and social facts and data".

In England, he worked alongside prominent anarchist intellectual Peter Kropotkin, with whom he formed a close friendship, visiting the Russian often at his home in Bromley, Kent and finding him to be an enthusiastic comrade and great teacher. Though he became increasingly less active in the labor movement whilst in England, he collaborated on the prominent London anarchist newspaper Freedom, alongside Kropotkin, Tcherkesow, Louise Michel, Max Nettlau and John Turner until his return to the United States in 1904.

=== Return to America ===
On his return from Europe, Kelly continued selling printing equipment for American Machine and Foundry until 1920, with the exception of several weeks in 1911 when he became a full-time professional organizer for the Francisco Ferrer Association of New York, an anarchist organization established to create Modern Schools in America based on the ideas of Francesc Ferrer i Guàrdia. Kelly worked as a salesman for several companies in the 1920s, including periods at the John Hancock Company and, for six months, the Metropolitan Insurance Company. Kelly struggled financially in the Great Depression, writing in 1932 that he had failed to earn enough in the preceding year to support himself, and being refused a TVA position after listing his political affiliation as "anarchist".

== Thought and activism ==
On his return to the United States from England, Kelly established libertarian communities and schools in New York and New Jersey. He was an early resident of Free Acres, a social experimental community developed by Bolton Hall in Berkeley Heights, New Jersey. He was a co-founder and organizer of the Ferrer Modern School at Stelton Colony in Piscataway Township, New Jersey, which became the most successful and longest lasting anarchist colony in America. He left the colony in 1923, and went on to found the Mohegan Colony at Lake Mohegan, New York in 1925, and later the Mount Airy Colony at Harmon, New York.

He was a close friend of Russian anarchists Emma Goldman and Alexander Berkman, alongside whom he worked for years until their deportation under the Anarchist Exclusion Act in 1918. Kelly sought to establish an anarchist society founded on voluntary association, in which coercion and authority would be replaced with personal freedom, individual autonomy and mutual aid. "Anarchism", he wrote to anarchist historian Max Nettlau, "is an ideal to strive for but it requires patience and fortitude in an uncanny degree to live it."

In a speech celebrating Kelly's fiftieth birthday, Havel elaborated:

Yet Kelly is not satisfied with having merely a desire; what he is longing for is to translate his desire into deeds. He is not content in having an ideal --- lie works for the realization of his ideal. Consequently he is always willing to put aside his private life and to act at every opportunity as speaker, organizer or writer, as the occasion requires. Like Francisco Ferrer, the martyred founder of the Modern Schools in Spain, he has to preach the gospel at all times.

— Havel, Hippolyte, Harry Kelly: An Appreciation by Hippolyte Havel, January 23, 1921

Kelly's attitude towards his life divided between wage labor and activism was one of ambivalence.

== Death ==
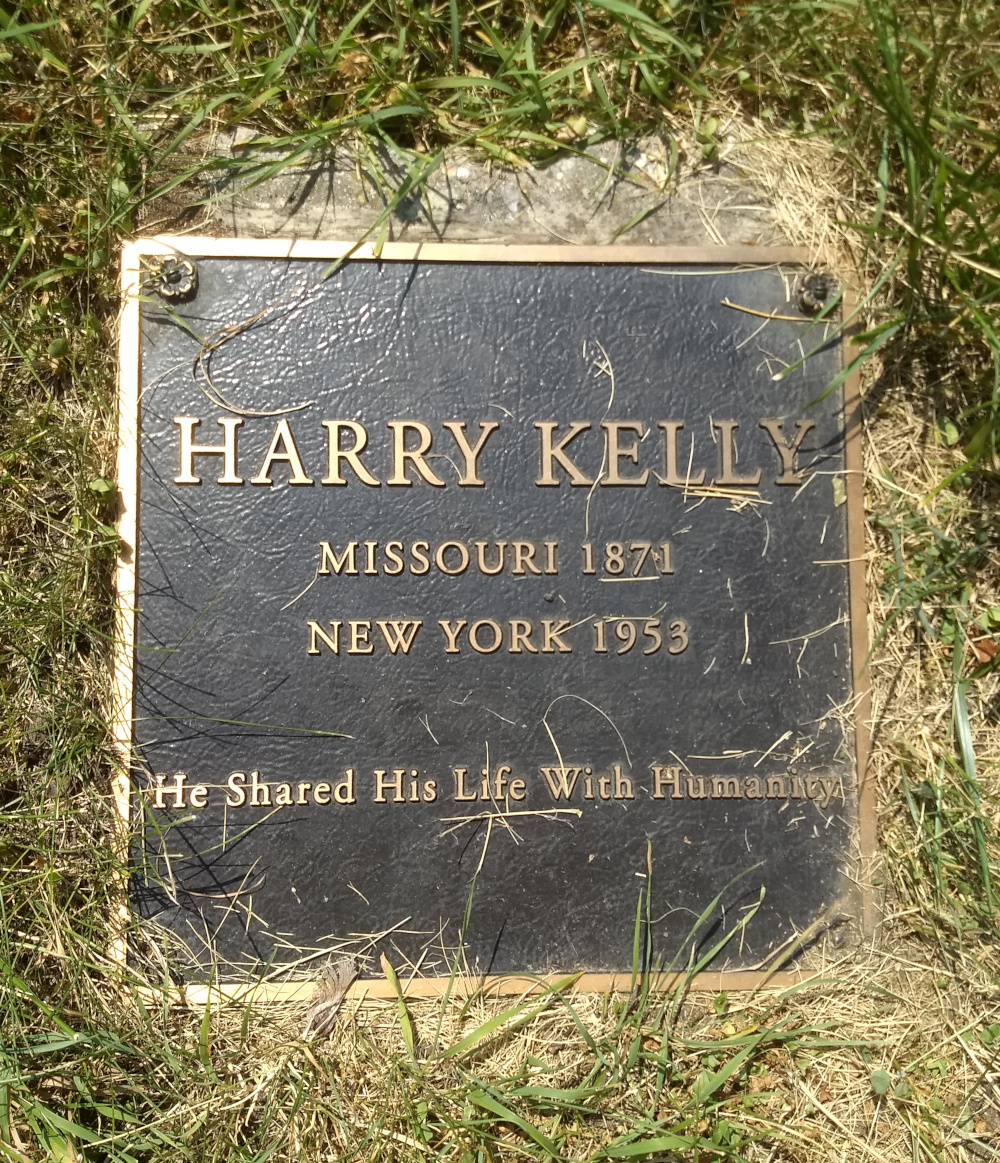
Kelly's grave at Forest Home Cemetery

Kelly died in New Rochelle, New York in 1953. He was buried near the Haymarket Martyrs' Monument at Forest Home Cemetery in Forest Park, Illinois.

== Works online ==
- 1908: "Anarchism: A Plea for the Impersonal", in Mother Earth, Vol. II, No. 12 (February 1908). 555–562.
- 1912: "A Review of the Year", in Mother Earth, Vol. VI, No. 11 (January 1912). 331–334.

== See also ==
- Anarchism in the United States

== Bibliography ==
- Avrich, Paul (1988). Anarchist Portraits. Princeton: Princeton University Press. ISBN 0-691-00609-1.
- Avrich, Paul (1992). The Modern School Movement. Princeton: Princeton University Press. ISBN 0-691-10094-2. OCLC 59858243.
- Avrich, Paul (2006). Anarchist Voices: An Oral History of Anarchism in America. Stirling: AK Press. ISBN 1-904859-27-5.
- Glassgold, Peter (2001). Anarchy!: An Anthology of Emma Goldman's "Mother Earth". Washington: Counterpoint. ISBN 1-58243-040-3.
- Perlin, Terry (1979). Contemporary Anarchism. New Brunswick: Transaction Books. ISBN 0-87855-097-6.
- Trahair, Richard (1999). Utopias and Utopians. Westport: Greenwood Press. p. 213. ISBN 0-313-29465-8.
- Veysey, Laurence (1978). The Communal Experience. Chicago: University of Chicago Press. ISBN 0-226-85458-2.
