= Thomas Keell =

British anarchist (1866–1938)

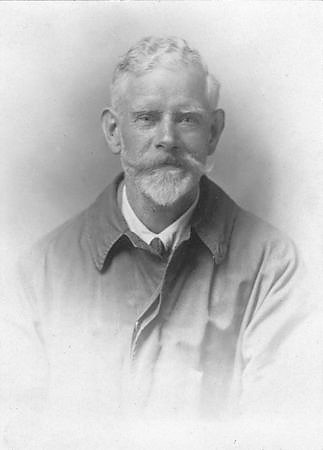
- Keell in May 1930
- Born: Thomas Henry Keell; 24 September 1866; Blackheath, London, United Kingdom
- Died: 26 June 1938 (aged 71); Whiteway Colony, Gloucestershire, England
- Occupations: Compositor; Newspaper editor
- Organization: Freedom Press
- Partner: Lilian Wolfe

Thomas Henry Keell (24 September 1866 – 26 June 1938) was an English anarchist who edited the anarchist newspaper Freedom from 1907 to 1928.

== Biography ==
In 1881 Keell served a seven-year apprenticeship as a compositor in the trade of letterpress printing and in 1887 he was admitted to the London Society of Compositors. His earliest political interests included landlordism and land reform. Soon afterwards he became interested in socialism and in the mid-1890s he joined the Independent Labour Party. Then, in 1896 he came into contact with anarchism when he was invited to undertake paid compositing work for the revival in London of The Alarm, the defunct American anarchist newspaper. Subsequently he regularly attended anarchist meetings and in 1898 he came into contact with the Freedom anarchists. In 1902 Keell was working as a compositor for The Spectator magazine. In 1907, he attended the International Anarchist Congress of Amsterdam, where he was hailed by Emma Goldman as "one of our most devoted workers on the London Freedom". Also in 1907 he left The Spectator to work for a wage that the Freedom Group paid for him to undertake four roles. The roles comprised the compositor of Freedom and Voice of Labour, the Group's new paper; the editor of Freedom and that of a manager. Keell subsequently contributed to Voice of Labour for many years and was an outspoken opponent of the First World War.

In 1916 Keell and his companion Lilian Wolfe were arrested during a police raid on the Freedom offices. They were imprisoned and in 1928 retired to live in Whiteway Colony outside Stroud, Gloucestershire, from where he irregularly published Freedom Bulletin for the surviving subscribers of Freedom. In 1936 Keell was approached by Vernon Richards, the son of a London Italian anarchist, for help with the bilingual journal Italia Libera/Free Italy, which he edited with Camillo Berneri, his future father-in-law. In the July Richards and Berneri suspended publication of the journal. Keell then helped Richards with the production of the pamphlet The struggle for liberty in Spain In the December Keell, Wolfe and Richards launched the anarchist newspaper Spain and the World, which Keell came to regard as the proper successor to Freedom.

Keell died in Whiteways in 1938, of heart failure.

== See also ==
- List of anarchist periodicals
- Manifesto of the Sixteen

== Footnotes ==
Media offices
Preceded by Alfred Marsh	Editor of Freedom; 1910–1928	Succeeded by John Turner
