= Lilian Wolfe =

English anarchist (1875–1974)

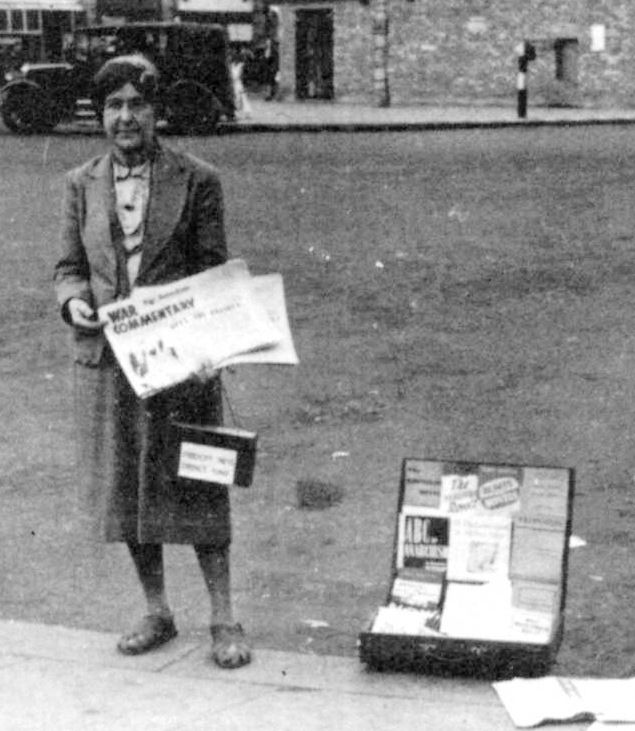
- Wolfe selling War Commentary in 1945
- Born: Lilian Gertrude Woolf; 22 December 1875; London, England
- Died: 28 April 1974 (aged 98); Cheltenham, Gloucestershire, England
- Education: Regent Street Polytechnic
- Organisation: Freedom Press
- Partner: Thomas Keell

Lilian Gertrude Woolf, better known as Lilian Wolfe (22 December 1875 in London – 28 April 1974 in Cheltenham), was an English anarchist, pacifist and feminist. She was for most of her life a member of the Freedom Press publishing collective.

== Early life and radicalisation ==
Wolfe was born in her father's jewellery shop on Edgware Road, London on 22 December 1875. Her mother, Lucy Helen Jones, was an actress from Birmingham whom Wolfe would describe as "a very frustrated woman" who left the family when Wolfe was thirteen years of age in order tour the world with an operatic company. Her father, Albert Lewis Woolf was a Liverpudlian jeweller of Jewish descent and of a conservative outlook. She had three brothers and two sisters, and had a comfortable and orthodox middle-class upbringing, educated first by governesses and later for a short period at the Regent Street Polytechnic.

Wolfe started work as a telegraphist in the Central Telegraph Office (West) in London. While working there she became a socialist and a suffragette. And she was an active member of the Civil Service Socialist Society, which was ‘dedicated to educating civil servants in socialism’ However, she became disillusioned with parliamentary politics and came to consider the granting of the voting franchise to women a mere "palliative". Consequently, she became attracted to the anarchism and became a founding contributor to the anarchist periodical The Voice of Labour.

== Activism in London and the Whiteway Colony ==
In 1916, following the introduction of conscription by the Military Service Act, The Voice of Labour published an article on disobedience which encouraged readers to dodge the draft and go into hiding in the Scottish Highlands. Wolfe and her partner Thomas Keell were arrested during a subsequent raid of Freedom offices as being 'the two leading troublemakers'. They were charged and found guilty under the Defence of the Realm Act. Wolfe received a sentence of a £25 fine or two months in prison. She chose the latter. Keell too chose prison over payment, though his sentence was for £100 or three months respectively. In prison however, the forty-year-old Wolfe discovered that she was pregnant. Consequently, she paid the fine and secured her release.

In 1917 Wolfe lived in Marsh House, the anarchist commune in Bloomsbury, London, with Nellie Dick, Fred Dunn, and Gaston Marin. Around 1920 she lived with Keell, their son and W C Owen in Willesden. Then they left London to live in the Tolstoyan Whiteway Colony, near Stroud, Gloucestershire where Keell and her undertook numerous roles. They served as the secretary of the colony and they gave their full support to the paper Spain and the World, which had been started by Vernon Richards in support of the Spanish anarchists in the civil war. He published the paper and she acted as its administrator. And she ran a food shop in nearby Stroud. Then, after Keell died in 1938, she continued to support Richards by travelling to London in the weekends, where she stayed with him and his partner Marie-Louise Berneri to help in the offices of Freedom Press, which published the paper. At Whiteway, she cared for Richard Blair, the son of George Orwell, when he was incapacitated elsewhere in a sanitorium. In 1943, she relinquished the food shop and returned to London.

== Later activism in London ==
In London Wolfe was politically active well into her old age. She sold Peace News in her 90s, and acted as the manager and the administrator of the Freedom Press bookshop until the age of 95. Also, until shortly before her death from a stroke at the age of 98, she was active in National Council for Civil Liberties and War Resisters International.

In the centennial edition of Freedom, anarchist historian Nicolas Walter hailed Wolfe as "one of the least public but most important figures in the Freedom Press for more than half a century".

== See also ==
- List of peace activists
- Outline of anarchism
