= Hiro Kamigaki =

Japanese Illustrator (born 1966)

Hirofumi (Hiro) Kamigaki
- カミガキヒロフミ
- Born: 1966 (age 59–60); Kure, Hiroshima (Japan)
- Education: Kyushu Sangyo University
- Occupation: Illustrator
- Known for: Founder of illustration studio IC4DESIGN
- Notable work: Pierre the Maze Detective book series

Hirofumi Kamigaki (カミガキヒロフミ, 1966) is a Japanese illustrator and designer based in Hiroshima, best known as the founder and creative director of the illustration studio IC4DESIGN and as the creator of the puzzle-book series Pierre the Maze Detective. His work is characterized by densely detailed, colorful scenes that combine architectural complexity, narrative subplots, and playful visual discovery.

After beginning his career as a designer in Hiroshima and becoming self-employed in 1998, Kamigaki formally established IC4DESIGN as a company in 2006. A major turning point came around the age of 40, when he shifted his focus from the traditional Tokyo-centered creative market to overseas clients, leveraging digital communication to pursue international work directly from Hiroshima. This strategy led to a breakthrough cover illustration for The New York Times Magazine in 2009, which received an Art Directors Club of New York (ADC) Silver Award and helped establish his reputation and signature ultra-dense visual style.

Alongside commercial projects for international clients, Kamigaki has devoted increasing attention to long-form narrative works, most notably Pierre the Maze Detective, a maze-based picture-book series that has sold over one million copies worldwide and been translated into more than 30 languages. In addition to his illustration work, he has been active in education, broadcasting, and civic roles in Hiroshima Prefecture, and is known for advocating a creative philosophy centered on enjoyment, persistence, and global engagement from a regional base.

== Biography ==
=== Early life and education ===
Hirofumi Kamigaki was born in 1966 in Kure, Hiroshima Prefecture. He studied art in Fukuoka and graduated from Kyushu Sangyo University’s Faculty of Art, Design Department. Kamigaki has stated that he chose design as a profession because he preferred spending all seven days drawing rather than working a conventional five-day job and resting on weekends.

=== Early career and transition to independent practice ===
After graduating from art school, Kamigaki began his professional career as a designer rather than an illustrator, first joining a Hiroshima-based video game company after sending unsolicited letters and work samples despite the company not hiring at the time. He later left because the work focused on modifying others’ creations rather than producing original drawings, prompting moves to a design firm and subsequently an advertising agency in Hiroshima.

Seeking greater creative independence, he became a self-employed designer in 1998, initially doing illustration and design work from his apartment without a formal business plan. He structured his independent practice so that commercial client work supported him financially, while self-initiated illustration work—often done at night—served as portfolio development and long-term career investment. Kamigaki has described this period as a self-imposed “mud era” of long hours and low pay, guided by a distinction between “deadline work” for clients and “no-deadline work” for skill development, an approach influenced by a quote from sumo champion Chiyonofuji about balancing immediate and long-term training.

=== Studio founding and growth ===
In 2006, Kamigaki formally established his illustration and design studio, IC4DESIGN, in Hiroshima. He has explained that the decision to incorporate was motivated both by his long-standing entrepreneurial ambitions and by a practical desire to provide stability and benefits for collaborators already working with him, thereby formalizing what had been a small, team-based studio practice handling editorial, commercial, and narrative illustration projects. (Note: Editorial projects are illustrations commissioned to accompany or interpret written content, typically in newspapers, magazines, or online publications; their function is explanatory or interpretive rather than directly promotional (for example, cover and feature illustrations for The New York Times Magazine or Newsweek). Commercial projects are commissioned primarily to promote a product, service, brand, or campaign and are tied to advertising or marketing objectives (for example, Amtrak’s National Train Day poster, UN Women advocacy campaigns, Adobe Stock illustration assets, or corporate anniversary visuals for Mazda). Narrative projects are illustration-driven works in which the images themselves carry an ongoing story or structured experience, often across multiple scenes or pages, rather than merely supporting text (for example, the Pierre the Maze Detective book series, maze books, exhibitions such as The Maze of Sofia, or related game adaptations).)

A decisive turning point in the studio’s early development came around the age of 40, when Kamigaki reassessed the conventional Tokyo-centered career path and instead chose to pursue international clients directly from Hiroshima, concluding that email and digital communication had largely erased geographic constraints. Beginning in late 2008, he undertook sustained overseas outreach, sending nearly one thousand unsolicited emails and making approximately five hundred calls in an effort to secure international representation and commissions. This persistence led to his first U.S. commission from the Howard Hughes Medical Institute, followed by securing a New York–based agent.

The effort culminated in a breakthrough 2009 cover commission for The New York Times Magazine, overseen by art director Arem Duplessis, who explicitly requested an illustration so densely detailed that readers would examine it for “minutes, not seconds.” Although the cover did not immediately translate into widespread domestic recognition, it later received an Art Directors Club of New York (ADC) Silver Award and became a defining moment in establishing both Kamigaki’s international profile and the visual direction that would come to characterize IC4DESIGN’s work.

== Professional work ==
=== Studio work ===
Through IC4DESIGN, the illustration studio he founded and leads in Hiroshima, Kamigaki has developed a sustained body of editorial, commercial, and narrative illustration work for both Japanese and international clients. The studio is recognized for its densely detailed, colorful cityscape imagery and narrative-rich compositions, and has maintained an international practice since the late 2000s while remaining headquartered in Hiroshima.

Notable editorial projects include cover and feature illustrations for publications such as The New York Times Magazine and Los Angeles Times Magazine. Its commercial and institutional clients have included Amtrak, Adobe, Newsweek, Toyota, Ogilvy, and campaigns for UN Women, as well as digital projects such as emoji design for Google.

The work produced through IC4DESIGN has been acknowledged through selection among the “200 Best Illustrators Worldwide” by BIS Publishers, inclusion in American Illustration and the Society of Illustrators, and receipt of an Art Directors Club of New York (ADC) Silver Award. Despite its global reach, Kamigaki has continued to maintain a strong professional presence in Hiroshima through regional commissions and collaborations.

=== Illustrated maze book series ===
In parallel with commissioned work, Kamigaki and IC4DESIGN have produced the puzzle-book series Pierre the Maze Detective, their most notable creation and a central element of the studio’s international recognition.

The books feature double-page maze illustrations of bustling cityscapes, fantastical environments, and interconnected visual stories. The narrative follows Pierre and his companion Carmen as they pursue the thief Mr. X, whose magical artifacts transform ordinary settings into labyrinths. Since the publication of the first volume in 2014, the series has sold more than one million copies and has been translated into over thirty languages. The franchise has expanded to include activity books, merchandise, and a video-game adaptation released in 2021.

The production of the first book of Pierre the Maze Detective entailed the team moving from rough sketches to linework to final color across a workflow that took over two years to complete.

Kamigaki has spoken frequently about how the Pierre series embodies his lifelong creative ambitions. His highly detailed style, shaped by exposure to international illustrators and by advice to create images viewers would study for “minutes, not seconds,” became a defining feature of the series. Kamigaki described the completed first book as feeling like his “personal art collection.” that contains “everything [he] ever wanted to draw.”

The series has received international accolades for its detailed and highly interactive visual storytelling and graphic design, including being shortlisted for the World Illustration Awards from the Association of Illustrators, receiving honors from the ADC Awards, earning a NYX Awards Grand Winner distinction, and receiving honors at the Kyoto Global Design Awards.

=== Other activities and affiliations ===
In addition to his illustration practice, Kamigaki has been active in broadcasting and education. He has worked as a radio personality and host on Hiroshima FM, reflecting his engagement with local media and the regional creative community. He has also led educational sessions at Anabuki Design College Hiroshima for graphic design students, contributing to professional training and mentorship in illustration and design. He served as a judge for the Illustration category of the 100th ADC Awards in 2021.

Kamigaki has also taken on civic roles connected to his hometown. In 2024, he was appointed Kure Tourism Ambassador, receiving a formal letter of appointment from the mayor of Kure and speaking publicly about the city’s appeal, highlighting his ongoing involvement in local cultural promotion.

== Artistic style and technique ==
Kamigaki’s visual style is defined by extremely dense, intricately constructed scenes, often depicting expansive architectural environments rendered in bright, saturated color palettes and populated by hundreds of small figures, visual jokes, and parallel subplots. His work is frequently compared (by critics and by Kamigaki himself) to Where's Wally?, Tintin, and the broader Franco-Belgian comics tradition, reflecting an emphasis on exploration, visual discovery, and narrative richness within a single image. Reviewers have also likened his elaborate, imaginative compositions to those of French illustrator Jean “Moebius” Giraud, particularly in their scale and imaginative scope.

He aims to communicate a personal worldview through images that are playful, immersive, and meticulously detailed—an approach that has also shaped longer-form projects such as the Pierre the Maze Detective series. He consistently emphasizes surprise and visual impact, pushing composition and color to evoke surprise while sustaining prolonged engagement.

A defining feature of his work is his trademark extreme visual density, a stylistic direction that emerged deliberately as a strategy to stand out in highly competitive international markets, especially during early efforts to secure work in the United States. Kamigaki has explained that this approach was reinforced by feedback from a New York art director, who encouraged him to create illustrations that readers would examine “for minutes, not seconds,” rather than glance at briefly. This is an idea that became central to his illustration philosophy.

Methodologically, Kamigaki’s work is grounded in extensive research and preparatory study. For large-scale urban labyrinth illustrations, he and his team at IC4DESIGN draw on photographs, satellite imagery, maps, and investigations of local customs before producing finished compositions. When depicting a real place, he often begins by imagining an idealized or utopian version of it without visiting it, later refining the work after on-site observation into more detailed and accurate iterations that may incorporate textual or verbal elements alongside imagery.

Kamigaki says his creative process is grounded in everyday desire and observation, drawing inspiration from cities he wishes to live in or visit, objects encountered in daily life, films, fashion, paintings, photography, and the work of other illustrators and designers. To support this process, he relies heavily on digital tools, maintaining extensive archives of historical and mid-20th-century photographs, dioramas, artworks, and illustrations for reference and idea generation, which he reviews during downtime. He cites his iPad as an indispensable tool, functioning as both a sketchbook and a visual database.

== Philosophy and approach to creative work ==
Kamigaki has described his approach to work as driven by sustained curiosity and intrinsic motivation rather than rigid discipline. In interviews, he characterizes his working style as one that prioritizes pleasure in the act of creation, deliberately shaping his studio environment to make long hours comfortable and creatively stimulating, including surrounding himself with musical instruments and toys and maintaining a relaxed atmosphere. He explains that he chose design as a profession because he preferred drawing every day rather than separating work and leisure, and he consistently frames creative work as a seamless blend of livelihood, hobby, self-expression, and long-term ambition. He balances routine commercial tasks with dream projects that include books and original merchandise.

His management style frames IC4DESIGN as a collective pursuit of shared long-term creative ambitions rather than as a conventional company hierarchy. He encourages staff and students' individuality, pursuit of overseas opportunities, and avoids assuming borders or geography impose creative limits. His own shift to a global outlook—realizing that, via email, Tokyo and New York were equally accessible—still shapes the studio’s openness to international collaboration and its multilingual outreach channels.

Kamigaki places strong emphasis on persistence and incremental effort. He frequently cites the importance of steady accumulation (summarized in advice he received to “collect small things”) and argues that sustained practice produces visible qualitative differences over time. He advises aspiring creators to continue drawing constantly, stressing that repetition and volume are essential to mastery, and he distinguishes between work done to meet immediate obligations and work undertaken for long-term growth and skill development. In his view, success depends less on innate talent than on desire strong enough to overcome self-imposed limitations and “invisible walls.”

His thinking about creativity is closely tied to independence and the rejection of fixed assumptions. Kamigaki has argued that creators should question conventional norms, both social and professional, and avoid becoming constrained by inherited ideas about how work “should” be done. He describes himself less as a traditional executive than as a member of a team pursuing a shared dream, emphasizing the importance of communication with clients to translate intent into effective visual expression. He also maintains that sensitivity and originality arise from immersion and genuine passion rather than deliberate cultivation, and that memorable individuality is more valuable than balanced generalism.

Kamigaki’s outlook is strongly shaped by globalization and digital connectivity. Reflecting on his earlier sense of a “Tokyo complex,” he later concluded that the internet had flattened geography, enabling creators to work globally regardless of location. He encourages artists to think beyond national borders, arguing that overseas clients prioritize quality and communication over nationality or place, and that digital tools, social media, and crowdfunding have made global niche audiences accessible even from regional cities such as Hiroshima. While he expresses no strong sentimental attachment to Hiroshima, he likens it to a “parents’ home” and advocates for greater cosmopolitan openness and interaction with international visitors as a way to strengthen the city’s cultural vitality.

Ultimately, he defines happiness in creative work through meaningful achievements and the expansion of projects he values, such as the growing readership of his picture books, and consistently encourages younger creators to pursue work they genuinely enjoy, arguing that long-term effort is only sustainable when driven by authentic interest.

== Publications ==
- Pierre the Maze Detective: The Search for the Stolen Maze Stone. 2015.
- Pierre the Maze Detective: The Mystery of the Empire Maze Tower. 2017.
- Pierre the Maze Detective: The Curious Case of the Castle in the Sky. 2020.
- Pierre the Maze Detective: The Hunt for the Maze Pyramid. 2025.
