= IC4DESIGN =

Japanese illustration and design studio

- Formation: 2006
- Founder: Hiro Kamigaki
- Coordinates: 34.388006625429924°N 132.45992726209334°E
- Services: Illustration
- Staff: ~5
- Website: ic4design.com

IC4DESIGN is an illustration and design studio based in Hiroshima, Japan. It was founded in 2006 by Japanese artist Hiro Kamigaki. The studio is known for its highly detailed, hand-drawn visual style, often characterized by dense urban environments, maze-like compositions, humorous narratives, and bright palettes.

Its best-known work is the puzzle book series Pierre the Maze Detective, which has sold over a million copies and has been translated into over 30 languages.

== History ==
=== Beginnings and founding ===
In his early career, before he founded IC4DESIGN, Hiro Kamigaki worked at videogame design company, a design firm, and an advertising agency. In those jobs he felt his work was not creative enough, and began also working as a freelancer, taking commissions from his apartment. In 1998, he left his other jobs and devoted himself to working independently. Early on he was challenged with his limited business knowledge and the difficulty of client outreach before widespread internet use; an experience he later described as formative in developing both persistence and a willingness to seek work proactively.

Kamigaki formally established IC4DESIGN in Hiroshima in 2006. He and his small team took on editorial, commercial, and narrative projects. (Note: Editorial projects are image deisgns commissioned to accompany or illustrate written content, typically in newspapers, magazines, or online publications. Their purpose is to explain or illustrate a concept rather than being a promotional piece. IC4DESIGN examples of this includes cover and feature illustrations for The New York Times Magazine and Newsweek. Commercial projects are commissioned for advertising, marketing, or promotional objectives. Examples of this are Amtrak’s National Train Day poster, UN Women advocacy campaign, and corporate anniversary designs for Mazda. Narrative projects are works driven by their illustrations, with the images themselves telling a story, often across multiple pages or scenes. For example, the Pierre the Maze Detective book series and related game adaptations.) From the outset, the studio developed a collaborative production process involving shared sketching and iterative refinement with some projects taking years to complete.

=== International expansion ===
Beginning in late 2008, Kamigaki began to do direct outreach outside Japan. He sent nearly one thousand emails and made about five hundred calls abroad in an effort to secure an agent and clients. Eventually, this effort landed him a New York agent and, in 2009, a breakthrough commission for the cover of The New York Times Magazine. At first, the studio's early overseas successes did not lead to more commissions within the Japanese domestic market. But it did increase its international visibility, garnering more commissions from outside Japan. Kamigaki later reflected that working from Hiroshima with the facilities of internet communications, made pitching to potential clients in Tokyo and in New York feel equally accessible, and the early success encouraged him to expand the studio’s international work. Kamigaki and colleague Daisuke Matsubara also cited the 2010 Amtrak National Train Day poster as a formative milestone; having achieved the remarkable feat of having won the U.S. competition while working exclusively from Hiroshima.

By the mid-2010s, IC4DESIGN had completed commissions from multiple international notable clients. In 2014 the studio reached another milestone, with the release of Pierre the Maze Detective, the first in a series of picture books of elaborate maze-based illustrations. This series further broadened the studio’s audience, being translated into more than 30 languages, and the increased notoriety contributed to more demand for the studio's commercial work.

=== Domestic work and reception ===
In the late 2000s and 2010s, in tandem with the growth in international work, IC4DESIGN continued to engage with domestic clients. The overseas recognition finally boosted Japan-based commissions, particularly from Tokyo, leading to Kamigaki's acceptance into the Tokyo Illustrators Society. Kamigaki thought of this as a form of “re-imported” recognition that he has noted is especially valued by Japanese audiences (international success begets domestic success). At the same time, the studio’s work became widely recognizable in its home city of Hiroshima, appearing across local institutions and businesses.

== Studio ==
=== Artistic style ===
The studio’s style is defined by very dense colorful scenes, often urban landscapes, filled with hidden, and often whimsical and humorous details. This design rewards sustained viewing and close inspection of its many details. It draws inspiration from the search-and-find traditions popularized by Where's Wally?, adapting that format into elaborate scenes that often include mazes, or are maze-like, contain storytelling and hidden puzzles. Kamigaki describes the studio’s signature style of extreme density as a strategic response to the intense competition he faced in overseas markets; producing images that viewers could study “for minutes, not seconds”. This was a challenge given to him by The New York Times Magazine art director Arem Duplessis, and became a defining principle of the studio's aesthetic.

=== Team, culture, and methodology ===
IC4DESIGN is led by illustrator Hiro Kamigaki alongside longtime collaborator and art director Daisuke Matsubara. They form the core of the Hiroshima-based collective. Other team members include Yoko Sugi, Arisa Imamura, Masami Tatsugawa, Keiko Kamigaki, Liang Xiaoming, and later Yujiro Ayano. The studio has cultivated a collaborative and family-like working environment, where shared creativity and mutual support shape daily routines and long-term projects. The team describes its culture as combining enjoyment, ambition, and openness to the world.

When designs are based on real locations, the studio conducts research to gather photographs and maps. Projects then start with sketches, continue with detailed linework, and end with coloring, with numerous iterations. Some projects can take several years, with multiple team members working on the same project.

== Notable projects ==
=== Editorial and commercial projects ===
- The New York Times Magazine (2009): "Infrastructure" cover for The New York Times Magazine (June 14, 2009). Art director Arem Duplessis asked him to create an illustration so detailed that readers would look at it for minutes rather than seconds. The cover later received industry recognition. This commission was an early breakthrough in the studio's search for international clients, and it cemented its signature dense visual style.
- Amtrak's National Train Day (2010): A poster for Amtrak’s “National Train Day” in the United States, which appeared at more than 180 locations across the U.S. It was described by the Tokyo Illustrators Society as “classic, meticulous illustration” whose scale and quality were comparable to a Japanese Railways-level commission in Japan. Kamigaki and art director Daisuke Matsubara were selected for the project through a major U.S. competition without leaving Hiroshima. This project further helped reshape their outlook on what a Hiroshima-based studio could accomplish internationally.
- UN Women Egypt (2017): The studio worked on an advocacy project with UN Women in Egypt; a campaign named “Finding Her” created with marketing agency DDB Dubai. It is a three-piece series inspired by Where’s Waldo? which depicts a space station, a parliamentary hall, and a scientific research facility, each teeming with male figures but hiding just one woman. The images aimed to highlight women’s underrepresentation in Egyptian politics, science, and technology, where female workforce participation stood at 23 percent. It was published in multiple Egyptian magazines, and was broadly shared on social media. It was later selected by UN Women as an official global initiative promoting women’s participation in the workplace. It won a Gold Award at the 2017 Dubai Lynx festival.
- National Gallery of Bulgaria (2023): In Europe, IC4DESIGN created “The Maze of Sofia,” a project presented at Bulgaria’s National Gallery. The project presents imaginary labyrinths inspired by the city of Sofia, blending Bulgarian motifs, kukeri, rose pickers, and other figures—into maze-like urban panoramas. Visitors were invited to navigate the illustrated city solving hidden challenges. The studio prepared for the project by collecting photographs, satellite images, and urban plans, and studied local customs.

In its home city of Hiroshima IC4DESIGN has worked on numerous projects for local institutions. For Mazda’s 100th anniversary in 2020, Kamigaki created the “Hiroshima Wakuwaku Coloring Sheet,” an illustration that places historic Mazda vehicles in a cityscape featuring regional landmarks. Hiroshima University commissioned “Hiroshima University: Exploring Wonderland,” a panoramic depiction of its campuses in East Hiroshima, Kasumi, and Higashi-Senda, along with surrounding regional landmarks such as the Atomic Bomb Dome and Itsukushima Shrine. Kamigaki also designed the university’s phoenix symbol and mascot, Hiroty. Beyond institutional commissions, IC4DESIGN’s work has become a familiar presence in Hiroshima, appearing in materials for schools and local businesses.

The studio has also undertaken projects for media and technology platforms. IC4DESIGN contributed illustration assets for Google Hangouts emoji design. It also developed designs for Adobe Stock.

IC4DESIGN has also taken on commissions from religious and civil society institutions. During the COVID-19 pandemic, Kamigaki collaborated with Senkoji Temple in Onomichi to create and donate the “Senkoji Temple Illustration,” a detailed image intended to support community morale during a period of restricted travel and public gathering. The illustration incorporates references to local history, films, and events associated with Onomichi and the temple itself, reflecting the studio’s practice of embedding layered cultural detail within its compositions.

=== Pierre the Maze Detective book series ===
Kamigaki’s most internationally recognized creation is the puzzle-book series Pierre the Maze Detective, developed with his team at IC4DESIGN. Each volume features double-page maze illustrations of imaginary cities and fantastical worlds. The stories follow the young detective Pierre and his companion Carmen as they chase the thief Mr. X, who uses magic to transform any location he is passing through into a labyrinth. Each scene includes a characteristic blend of mazes, hidden objects, and whimsical details.

The first volume, Pierre the Maze Detective: The Search for the Stolen Maze Stone, took two years to complete and was first released in Japan in 2014, and a year later abroad. As of 2026, the series contains four volumes, and has sold over a million copies and is translated into over 30 languages. The franchise has expanded into activity books, merchandise lines, and a video-game adaptation.

A video game adaptation Labyrinth City: Pierre the Maze Detective was released in 2021, developed by French studio Darjeeling. The game animates environments directly based on artwork from the books. (Note: In addition to awards granted directly to IC4DESIGN, the videogame adaptation Labyrinth City: Pierre the Maze Detective, developed in collaboration with the French studio Darjeeling, received multiple distinctions for its art direction and visual design. These honors include prizes from Game Connection Asia, IndieCade, IndiePlay China, Digital Dragons, and the Busan Indie Connect Festival.)

Kamigaki has stated his intention to publish five or six volumes during his lifetime.

==== Books list ====
- Pierre the Maze Detective: The Search for the Stolen Maze Stone (2014)
- Pierre the Maze Detective: The Mystery of the Empire Maze Tower (2017)
- Pierre the Maze Detective: The Curious Case of the Castle in the Sky (2020)
- Pierre the Maze Detective: The Hunt for the Maze Pyramid (2025)

== Exhibitions ==
=== Hiroshima, Japan ===
In 2010, IC4DESIGN opened its first solo exhibition, "Line den City", in Hiroshima. It included commercial and personal projects, including the New York Times Magazine "Infrastructure" cover illustration, and Amtrak's 2010 National Train Day campaign. The works were displayed as large-format, unframed prints, encouraging visitors to explore the “gimmicks” and hidden details characteristic of IC4DESIGN’s style.

In 2014 Hiroshima saw another exhibition from IC4DESIGN, this focus around the recently-launched book Maze Detective Pierre, showcasing the production process from rough thumbnails to final linework and color.

=== Sofia, Bulgaria ===
In 2023, IC4DESIGN presented Sofia’s Labyrinth at the National Gallery’s Kvadrat 500 in Sofia. The work was a maze-like urban landscape inspired in the Bulgarian capital, and it also featured local cultural references including superheroes, kukeri (traditional folk figures associated with ritual performances intended to ward off evil and bring health and fertility), and rose pickers. The illustrations included challenges to find hidden object, solve mazes, and find small scenes hidden within the larger landscape. The works were developed through a combination of advance research and subsequent on-site study, resulting in both colorful and black-and-white versions.

== Awards and distinctions ==
IC4DESIGN and its founder, Hiro Kamigaki, have received international recognition for their works in illustration, advertising, and design. Their breakthrough 2009 cover for The New York Times Magazine won an Art Directors Club of New York (ADC) 89 Silver Award and later became an American Society of Magazine Editors (ASME) Best Cover 2010 finalist, helping raise the studio’s profile outside Japan. In 2021 Kamigaki served as a judge for the 100th Art Directors Club of New York (ADC) Awards.

Later projects also garnered distinctions, notably for a UN Women workplace gender equality campaign. The studio has also been selected by American Illustration and the Society of Illustrators, listed among the “200 Best Illustrators Worldwide 09/10,” and featured in the books Illustration Now! Vol. 4 and Illustration Annual 52.

- Global illustration recognitions
  - Selected among the “200 Best Illustrators Worldwide 09/10”
  - Named among the top 200 illustrators worldwide by American Illustration and the Society of Illustrators
  - Included in TASCHEN’s Illustration Now! Vol. 4 (2013)
  - Selected for Illustration Annual 52 (U.S.)
- Advertising and design awards
  - ADC One Club 2009 (89th edition) – Silver Award (Design/Print/Illustration, U.S.) — Awarded for the New York Times Magazine cover.
  - ASME (American Society of Magazine Editors) Best Cover 2010 Finalist — For the New York Times Magazine cover.
  - ADC One Club 2010 – Silver award.
  - ADC One Club 2010 – Bronze award – Kakuichi Yokocho project
  - Dubai Lynx (2012, 2013) – Bronze awards
  - Cannes Lions 2017 – Bronze.
  - Dubai Lynx 2017 — Three gold awards for the UN Women gender-equality campaign.
  - London International Awards (2017) – Two Silver and One Bronze.
  - D&AD 2017 – Wood Pencil
- Accolades for Pierre the Maze Detective book series
  - World Illustration Awards (Association of Illustrators) 2016 – Shortlisted for Pierre the Maze Detective.
  - ADC Awards (One Club) 2018 – Silver award for The Mystery of the Empire Maze Tower.
  - NYX Awards 2020 – Grand Winner for The Curious Case of the Castle in the Sky.
  - Kyoto Global Design Awards 2021 – Visual Design recognition for The Curious Case of the Castle in the Sky.
- Illustration competition awards
  - 3×3 ProShow No. 13 (2016) – Gold.
  - 3×3 No. 14 (2017) – Best of Show.
