= Brooksby (surname) =

Brooksby is a surname. Notable people with the surname include:

- Angie Elizabeth Brooksby (born 1965), American painter
- Eleanor Brooksby, English noblewoman
- Jenson Brooksby (born 2000), American tennis player
- John Burns Brooksby (1914–1998), Scottish veterinarian
- Keegan Brooksby (born 1990), Australian rules footballer
