= Rufus Segar =

English anarchist illustrator and graphic designer (1932–2015)

- Born: 28 August 1932; Ipswich, Suffolk, England
- Died: 7 May 2015 (aged 82); Pershore, Worcestershire, England
- Education: Rhyl Grammar School; St Asaph Grammar School; Liverpool College of Art
- Occupations: Illustrator; Graphic designer
- Notable work: Anarchy (1961–1970)
- Movement: Anarchism
- Spouse: Sheila Bullard

Rufus Segar (28 August 1932 – 7 May 2015) was an English anarchist illustrator and graphic designer who was noted for designing the covers for the anarchist magazine Anarchy over ten years, for which he received critical acclaim.

He was born in Ipswich, Suffolk in England. His father was both a pharmacist and a businessman, which resulted in the family moving a lot in England and eventually to the North Wales coast. Segar initially attended grammar school and then enrolled on a course in the Liverpool College of Art. Following graduation in 1953, he and Sheila Bullard, his then-girlfriend, later to became his wife, moved to London. After working in two short-term jobs in the private sector, from 1964 to 1982, Segar worked freelance for the Economist Intelligence Unit. When he retired in the 1990s, he moved to Saltwood in Kent and then to Pershore in Worcestershire. He and his wife were life-long anarchists.

== Early life ==
Rufus Segar was born in Ipswich in Suffolk, England, on 28 August 1932, the second son of Eric and Ethel (née Bomber). His father was both a pharmacist and a businessman. As a result, the family moved a lot during his childhood while he set "up various ill-starred business ventures". The family moved to Walsall in 1936, Bilston in 1938, and Bristol in 1939. In 1946, they moved to Colwyn Bay on the North Wales coast, from where, two years later, they moved fourteen miles east to Prestatyn.

From at least at the age of 10 or 12 years old, Segar wanted to become a cartoonist. Consequently, while attending grammar school in St Asaph, he took an A-level in art. While there, his teacher led him to enrol on a four-year course in Liverpool College of Art, which he did in 1949. The course was split into halves. For the second half, students were asked to choose a discipline of applied art from about eight options. Seegar enrolled for illustration, a discipline about which he was extremely critical. He recalled: 'I was much more interested in techniques like aquatinting, etching, engraving, lithography, block-making, tone and line process work. And so I did all of those things. I gave myself a brief of roving about what other people did. I went off to pottery and went off to theatre design, to textiles, and just roved.'

While Segar was a student in Liverpool, he moved into an anarchist collective in Upper Parliament Street, where he met Sheila Bullard, like him an anarchist, whom he later married. (Note: Segar recalled to editor Daniel Poyner (Poyner 2012, p. 280) "... even after nearly forty years, Sheila my wife and I are still anarchists")

== Work in the private sector ==
Segar graduated from the Liverpool College of Art in 1953, after which the members of the collective moved to London, where they shared a flat in Hackney. Soon after moving into the flat, he married Bullard and they started a family. The flat became crowded. Consequently Segar and his family moved to a flat in Pimlico.

Segar initially got a job as a box designer for Hunt Partners in Clapton. In 1955, he was imprisoned for three months for refusing to perform National Service because, as an anarchist, "he could never obey an order to kill". (Note: Quoted by Segar 2015.) Rupert Segar, his son, documented that, while in prison, his father "was head librarian, made chess sets for the warders and learned to roll cigarettes one-handed". Segar's second job was as an assistant designer in advertising for Horatio Myer & Co Ltd in Vauxhall. Three years later, he got a job in S.H. Benson in Kingsway, the prestigious advertising agency. However, he recalled: "You're nowhere, just an assistant in the system. I watched that for three years, just seeing how it worked, then I said, 'It's not for me.'"

In 1961, while Segar was working for S.H. Benson, he also worked as a freelance designer, illustrating books. From 1964 to 1982, he freelanced for the Economist Intelligence Unit, as an illustrator and graphic designer (Note: David Crowley recalled that Segar's work comprised "creating charts, maps and other infographics for business, education and government."), for which he was offered 'a free office in St James's in return for being available and guaranteeing two days work a week'. In 1964 Segar illustrated with pictures How to get on with the boss by Diana Kay. In the following year, he Segar had published Cockney Alphabet, a picture book in which he parodied the British comedy duo Clapham and Dwyer. (Note: Segar 1965 was published by the same publisher that published Kay 1964.) In 1973, while he was working for the Unit, he joined a group of agents and illustrators to campaign for the safe return of their work after the completion of a commission. A committee was formed, in which Segar was a member, which created the Association of Illustrators. Also while working in the Unit, Segar designed the 136-page book Atlas of Europe - A profile of Western Europe, which was published jointly in 1974 by John Bartholomew and Frederick Warne. (Note: A selection of pages from the book are illustrated in Poyner 2012, pp. 274–275.) Segar designed the book to be updated every two or three years. But no new edition was published, which he attributed to the cuts to further education which Margaret Thatcher implemented in her capacity as the Secretary of State for Education and Science.

== Designing the covers for Anarchy magazine ==
In 1954, Segar was one of the founders of the anarchist Malatesta Club, which was created in a cellar in Holborn and which Colin Ward also attended. (Note: See also Sansom 1986.) In March 1961, Ward launched the magazine Anarchy to complement Freedom. (Note: Goodway 2012, p. 312 observed that Ward urged the case to his fellow editors for a "more reflective" Freedom, to which they eventually responded "by giving him his head with the monthly Anarchy from March 1961".) Ward recalled in his discussion with David Goodway: "It was decided that in the first week of every month the monthly journal should appear instead of the weekly, and that it should have, not the quarto (A4) format that I envisaged for a monthly Freedom but an octavo (A5) page."

Segar designed the second (April) issue of the magazine, about Workers' Control. From Issue Six onwards, he became the magazine's resident art director. He designed the covers of the issue in isolation from their contents and without any input from Ward, while working to a tight deadline. Segar described the covers as follows: "Some quick covers have been resounding, some laboured covers have been abysmal. The covers are the record of my response to ANARCHY a month in advance of publication without the benefit of reading the copy." The involvement of Segar with Anarchy came to a close with volume 10. Also, he recalled: "There was a change in management style and in size, format, and technique too." (Note: Under the heading Change of editor in Issue 118 (December 1970), Ward announced that it was the last issue under his editorship and that the new editor would be fellow anarchist Graham Moss. (Ward 1970, p. 399).) Segar initially designed four of five covers of the magazine. However, he recalled:

"... instead of just texts like Colin had run it, anything went. They also changed what was Colin's notion of what an issue of Anarchy should be about. Three, four, five, or six articles on a theme became a general mishmash and it just disintegrated. It was really too many cooks spoilt the broth. In the end I lost patience with it. I said, 'Well, obviously you can do what you like inside, and now you can do what you like on the cover,' and I dropped it. I just wasn't interested anymore."

=== Tributes ===
Segar's covers were published in their entirety by Hyphen Press in the 2012 book Autonomy: The Cover Designs of Anarchy 1961–1970, edited by Daniel Poyner. Kossoff (2016) opined:

"Anarchy's covers arguably amount, over the course of its nine-year existence, to one of the most impressive series of pamphlet graphic design ever created. They are some of the few examples in the modern era of politically and socially committed graphic designs that are of high quality and consistently inventive. (Other examples include the work of William Morris and the Futurists.) ... The covers of Anarchy, as Richard Hollis points out in an essay in the book, used the full spectrum of technology, which contributed to their variety and vitality. "

Anarchist author David Goodway (2012) described the covers as "superb". Graphic designer Richard Hollis (2012) observed: "Anarchy's covers stand out as a significant record of the early years of graphic design in Britain." Anarchist academic Sophie Scott-Brown (2023) described the front covers as "iconic" and opined "the journal's success owed much to Segar".

== Retirement ==
Segar initially retired with his wife to Saltwood in Kent, where they lived in the 1990s. In 1992, he had published his book Remember Hythe The High Street 1902-1992 for The Hythe Civic Society.

Segar and his wife became friends with Mike Umbers, the editor of the newsletter of the nearby Hythe Civic Society, and his wife. Segar worked voluntarily as an illustrator for the society. Umbers recalled: "... he was an entertaining conversationalist and we enjoyed supper and garden parties, setting the world to rights together." He cited Segar's production of a card book, Remember Hythe The High Street 1902-1992, for the Society, which was published by the MacSegar Press in Kent. He described his contributions of the extremely detailed designs of the covers for its newsletter, several of which are illustrated. (Note: Umbers also disclosed his complete surprise upon discovering that Segar was an anarchist, which he never mentioned, particularly because Umbers recalled that he had 'worn the Queen’s uniform for 39 years'.) In 1996 the book Flood, Fire, & Sudden Death: Some Calamitous Happenings in Old Hythe by Denise Raynor was published, which Segar illustrated.

In 1999 Segar had published Hungerford 2000, which comprises historical and modern information about the Berkshire town and illustrations of its buildings.

Around 1999, Segar and his wife moved to Pershore in Worcestershire to be near their children and grandchildren. In 2001, he collaborated with anarchist Donald Rooum on an obituary of their colleague psychologist Tony Gibson.

Segar died suddenly on 7 May 2015 at the age of 82, after a fall down the stairs at home. He was survived by his wife; his three sons, Rupert, BJ and Dan; and his two grandchildren. Rupert Segar recalled that his father's greatest love "was reserved for the books he illustrated ... all enriched with his visual wit."

== Archives ==
- Anarchy archive from The Sparrows' Nest.
- Anarchy magazine archive
