= Jacques Maroger =

French-American painter

- Self portrait
- Born: 1884; France
- Died: 1962 (aged 77–78); Baltimore, Maryland, U.S.
- Known for: Painting

Portrait of Jacques Maroger in the Guelma Impasse workshop by Raoul Dufy; Chartreuse Museum (Douai)

Jacques Maroger (French pronunciation: [maʁɔʒe]; 1884–1962) was a painter and the technical director of the Louvre Museum's laboratory in Paris. He devoted his life to understanding the oil-based media of the Old Masters. He emigrated to the United States in 1939 and became an influential teacher. His book, The Secret Formulas and Techniques of the Masters, has been criticized by some modern writers on painting who say that the painting medium Maroger promoted is unsound.

== Training and early career ==
In 1907, Maroger began to study with Louis Anquetin and worked under his direction until Anquetin's death in 1932. Anquetin worked closely and exhibited with the artists Vincent van Gogh, Charles Angrand, Émile Bernard, Paul Gauguin, Camille Pissarro, Georges Seurat, Paul Signac and Henri de Toulouse-Lautrec. Anquetin's early style was influenced by Impressionism, but in his later years he became very interested in the works of the Flemish masters. As Maroger's teacher, Anquetin provided guidance in the study of drawing, anatomy and master painting techniques. Maroger began to become famous around 1931, when the National Academy of Design in New York City reported Maroger's painting discoveries.

From 1930 to 1939, Maroger started to work at the Louvre Museum in Paris as Technical Director of the Louvre Laboratory. He served as a professor at the Louvre School, a Member of the Conservation Committee, General Secretary of the International Experts, and President of the Restorers of France. In 1937, he received the Légion d'honneur, and his pride at the honor is reflected in his self-portrait of the time, in which one can see his Legion pin on his lapel.

He emigrated to the United States in 1939 and became a lecturer at the Parsons School of Design in New York. His New York students, Reginald Marsh, John Koch, Fairfield Porter and Frank Mason adopted his Old Master painting techniques, and taught it in turn to their own students.

In 1942, Maroger became a Professor at the Maryland Institute College of Art in Baltimore and established a school of painting. At the Maryland Institute he led a group of painters who came to be known as the Baltimore Realists, including the painters Earl Hofmann, Thomas Rowe, Joseph Sheppard, Ann Didusch Schuler, Frank Redelius, John Bannon, Evan Keehn, and Melvin Miller.

Maroger published The Secret Formulas and Techniques of the Masters in 1948. When Maroger's book became available, Reginald Marsh drew on Maroger's book-jacket an airplane dropping an atomic bomb on the Maryland Art Institute, a reference to the controversy Maroger was causing in the local press over the abstract art versus realism debate.

Maroger's formula and techniques have been studied by many modern painters who wish to obtain the paint quality of the Old Masters. The "secret formula" that Maroger devised during his lifetime included the main ingredient white lead. White lead when cooked into linseed oil acts as a drying agent, accelerating the polymerization of the oil film.

Maroger claimed to have introduced to the modern day artist what the masters achieved centuries before in their paintings, a way to ensure permanence and color quality in oils without sacrificing fluid and subtle paint handling. Equipped with these formulas, the artist could once again blend his paint easily without losing control of his brush. The paint stays where it is applied and does not run off the panel. It dries very fast so that he can paint on the same areas the very next day, which speeds up painting.

Frank Redelius, one of Maroger's protégés from the Baltimore Realists group, wrote a book that updates, builds upon and revises Jacques Maroger's research of the painting techniques and formulas of the Old Masters. Redelius was assisting Maroger with a revision of The Secret Formulas and Techniques of the Masters before Maroger's death in 1962. Frank Redelius' book, published in 2009, is titled The Master Keys: A Painter's Treatise On The Pictorial Technique Of Oil Painting.

== Critics of Maroger ==
Maroger has been criticized by some modern writers on painting because of his bold assertions about having found the secret formulas of the Masters. The current proprietary Maroger's Medium is in fact the jelly-like medium also known as Megilp (Macgilp, McGuilp, etc.). This material, made by mixing heavy mastic varnish with a linseed oil that has been cooked to blackness with litharge or white lead, was introduced in the late 18th century and employed extensively during the 19th, and therefore is not of centuries-old pedigree.

The archival quality of the medium itself is controversial in art circles, in part because its documented use dates back less than a century. This is from Michael Skalka, Conservation Administrator, National Gallery of Art, Washington, DC.:

[Our convervators] know that Maroger and other media do not betray their bad characteristics for a long time. (60 years is not enough time – oil paint isn't even fully dry in 60 -80 years on a typical thickly painted painting) Maroger (1884–1962) did not influence artists until the early 20th century so 19th century works are not affected by his practices. However, recently, two conservators in a museum in New England examined and studied the work of John Stuart Curry who was an avid fan of Maroger. Many of his works have suffered through the use of the medium. Granted, Curry was a zealot who followed Maroger's early and late formulations. Curry's work employed an early Maroger formula that involved leaded oil, resin and in early versions incorporated water based additives. These have suffered the most.

See the work of Lance Mayer and Gay Myers for more information on Curry and Maroger.

Maroger medium which is not made properly may contain a large amount of dirt and impurities from improperly filtered mastic varnish, or the black oil may be overcooked, both of which would contribute to darkening and weakening of the work. In addition the overuse of megilp media (or any medium for that matter) tends to create weak paint films. Conservation science has shown that the presence of natural resins like mastic in the paint film causes embrittlement, darkening, and continued solubility. See the work of Leslie Carlyle or Joyce Townsend for problems related to 18th-century painting that contain megilp.

== Lost old master formulas by Maroger ==
=== Six formulas of Maroger taken from his book on painting formulas ===
1. Lead Medium – attributed to Antonello da Messina – One part litharge (yellow lead oxide) or lead white, combined by cooking with three to four parts linseed.
2. Lead Medium – attributed to Leonardo da Vinci – One part litharge or lead white, combined by cooking with three to four parts raw linseed oil, and three to four parts water.
3. Lead Medium – attributed to the Venetian painters – Giorgione, Titian and Tintoretto – One or two parts litharge or lead white, combined by cooking with 20 parts raw linseed or walnut oil.
4. Lead Medium – attributed to Peter Paul Rubens -This medium was allegedly based on the black oil of Giorgione with an addition of mastic resin, Venice turpentine and beeswax. One or two parts litharge or lead white, combines by cooking with 20 parts raw linseed. A little more than one spoonful of "black oil" combined with even one spoonful of mastic varnish resulted in the "jelly" medium thought to be Megilp (another name of Maroger media).
5. Lead Medium – (attributed to the "Little Dutch Masters") This medium was the same as the one used by Rubens, but did not include beeswax.
6. Lead Medium – attributed to Velázquez – One part verdigris (derived from copper – this material is substituted for the lead-based metallic driers), combined by cooking with 20 parts raw linseed or walnut oil.

The majority of these recipes are not employed today, as there are few companies that produce them. The primary form of "Maroger medium" known today is black oil ("Giorgione's" medium) and mastic varnish combined in approximately equal parts to form a gel.

While Maroger medium is usually mixed directly with oil paints, its proportion should be kept to no more than 20% of the mixture. A useful technique is to rub a very thin film of Maroger medium over the area to be painted and paint into that—known as "painting into the couch." This lubricates the brush stroke. Maroger medium (or any other painting medium, for that matter) should never be used as a final picture varnish, as Maroger requires reaction by admixture with oil paint in order to dry.

The reduced availability of lead, combined with injunctions against lead use in household products and other factors has caused most major paint makers to discontinue the production of Maroger's medium. Many paint makers now offer faux-maroger's media or faux-megilps, generally made by substituting different materials, such as lime, for genuine lead, or (as in the case of Gamblin's Neo-Megilp) by creating a similar product out of specially thickened alkyd medium. These products produce effects similar to, but not the same as those of real Maroger medium, which depends on specific chemical reactions between leaded oil, mastic resin, and turpentine (the mastic varnish vehicle).

== Home and Studio ==
The white gingerbread cottage that was Maroger's home in Baltimore is found on the east campus of Loyola College in Maryland and is used for drawing and painting courses. The building, created in the style of a Parisian studio, is aptly called the Maroger Art Studio.
