= Pierre the Maze Detective =

Japanese series of children's puzzle books

- Cover of first book in the series, Pierre the Maze Detective: The Search for the Stolen Maze Stone (2015).
- Pierre the Maze Detective: The Search for the Stolen Maze Stone; Pierre The Maze Detective: The Mystery of the Empire Maze Tower; Pierre The Maze Detective: The Curious Case of the Castle in the Sky; Pierre The Maze Detective: The hunt for the Maze Pyramid
- Author: Hiro Kamigaki, IC4DESIGN
- Country: Japan
- Genre: Children's literature, puzzle
- Publisher: UK, US: Laurence King Publishing (Hachette); Japan: Nagaoka Shoten
- Published: 2015–present
- Media type: Print (hardback and paperback)

Pierre the Maze Detective is a series of children’s puzzle books started in 2015 and created by Japanese illustrator Hiro Kamigaki and his studio IC4DESIGN. It consists of double-page illustrations with mazes and hidden-object challenges.

The series is influenced by Where's Wally?, Tintin, and the broader tradition of Franco-Belgian comics. It has elements of comic book story telling, combined with search-and-find challenges. The series has sold over a million copies and been translated into over 30 languages. The franchise also includes activity books, puzzles, and a video-game adaptation.

The narrative follows Pierre, a young detective who specializes in mazes, and his companion Carmen, as they pursue the elusive Phantom Thief X (also known as Mr. X), whose mischief magically turn cities into labyrinths. Each spread includes a labyrinthic crowded scene with Pierre at the starting point of a maze, and Mr. X at the end of it, making it the reader's challenge to help Pierre through the maze in pursuit of his nemesis.

== Description ==
The Pierre the Maze Detective books contain a series of double-page spreads. Each spread is a different setting, which always includes a maze, and hundreds of characters engaged in their own activities, much like Where's Wally?. The reader must solve the labyrinth of each page, guiding in the in-story protagonists, while also uncovering hidden items, clues, and smaller puzzles hidden throughout.

The recurring protagonists are Pierre, a courteous young detective in a red cap and suit, and his companion Carmen. Their nemesis, Phantom Thief X (or Mr. X), kicks off each adventure with the theft of magical artifacts that turn ordinary spaces into labyrinths.

The story unfolds as a pursuit through a sequence of interconnected mazes, where the end of each maze, leads to the beginning of the following one on the next spread. The plot is mostly developed thorugh the illustrations, and enriched with some brief written messages in each new spread.

The books are "detailed, brightly-colored, brimming with energy and full of humor." Kamigaki has stated that his goal is “to draw interesting scenes that no one has ever seen,” designing illustrations that reward slow observation and reveal new stories with each viewing. He has credited the artistic influences from Where's Wally?, Tintin, and the broader tradition of Franco-Belgian comics.

== History ==
The series began with the publication of Pierre the Maze Detective: The Search for the Stolen Maze Stone in 2014 in Japan, launching internationally the following year. It was created by Hiro Kamigaki and his team at the Hiroshima-based studio IC4DESIGN.

Prior to the creation of the series, Kamigaki and his team had first gained notoriety through the production of cover art for American magazines and other and campaigns for international clients, developeing their style of intricade, pop-art illustrations. The series was built on that experience, combining the rigors of professional visual design, while leaning into their signature playful style. Each title has taken multiple years to complete, with the following installments in the series being released in 2017, 2020, and 2025. Kamigaki has stated his intention to publish a fifth and final installment.

As of 2021, the series had sold one million copies and been translated into over 30 languages. Multiple licensed products have been spun off, including coloring books, sticker books and jigsaw puzzles.

== Reception ==
=== Critical response ===
Reviewers have most often compared this series to Where's Wally? for its dense composition and visual humor, allowing readers to revisit pages multiple times and continue discovering new details.

Publishers Weekly described the debut volume as featuring “Where’s Waldo? level of detail in the illustrations, along with secondary objects to locate and the unfolding mystery itself, ought to provide hours worth of entertainment for eagle-eyed readers." The Guardian described it as "seductively intricate, with the narrative guiding the reader via ballrooms, sweetshops and fairgrounds to the pinnacle of the titular tower, this gorgeous combination of search-and-find and maze is seeded with exciting hidden extras – mini-mazes, trophies and stars to spot. Too fascinating for bedtime, it’s the perfect rainy-day companion,"

GeekDad described the first volume as “one of the finest children’s books” of its year, highlighting the rich details and subplots that invite extended observation. Get Hiroshima described the artwork as “incredibly detailed and colorful,” and comparing it to the works of Jean “Moebius” Giraud for its architectural detail and imaginative scope.

=== Awards and distinctions ===
The Pierre the Maze Detective series has been recognized for its illustration quality and design innovation:

- World Illustration Awards 2016 – Shortlisted for Pierre the Maze Detective (Association of Illustrators).
- ADC Awards (One Club for Creativity) 2018 – Recognition for The Mystery of the Empire Maze Tower.
- NYX Awards 2020 – Grand Winner for The Curious Case of the Castle in the Sky.
- Kyoto Global Design Awards 2021 – Visual Design recognition for The Curious Case of the Castle in the Sky.

== Bibliography ==
=== Books main series ===
- Kamigaki, Hiro; IC4DESIGN (2015). Pierre the Maze Detective: The Search for the Stolen Maze Stone. ISBN 978-1780675633.
- Kamigaki, Hiro; IC4DESIGN (2017). Pierre The Maze Detective: The Mystery of the Empire Maze Tower. ISBN 978-1786270597.
- Kamigaki, Hiro; IC4DESIGN (2020). Pierre The Maze Detective: The Curious Case of the Castle in the Sky. ISBN 978-1786277404.
- Kamigaki, Hiro; IC4DESIGN (2025). Pierre The Maze Detective: The hunt for the Maze Pyramid. ISBN 978-1510230620.

=== Supplemental books ===
- IC4DESIGN; Kamigaki, Hiro (2016). Pierre the Maze Detective and The Great Coloring Adventure. ISBN 978-1780677903.
- IC4DESIGN; Kamigaki, Hiro (2017). Pierre the Maze Detective: The Sticker Book. ISBN 978-1780679662.

=== Credited artists ===
The books are created by Hiro Kamigaki and his Hiroshima-based illustration and design studio IC4DESIGN. The books have credited IC4DESIGN team members Daisuke Matsubara, Yoko Sugi, Arisa Imamura, Masami Tatsugawa, Keiko Kamigaki, Liang Xiaoming, and later Yujiro Ayano.

== Video game adaptation ==
Labyrinth City: Pierre the Maze Detective
- Developer: Darjeeling
- Publisher: Pixmain
- Directors: Noam Roubah; Marc Lustigman
- Producer: Léa Pernot
- Designers: Paul Vaille; Arthur Pilewicz
- Programmers: André Berlemont; Julien Liauzun; Enki Londe
- Writer: Wladimir Anselme
- Composer: Xavier Thiry
- Release: Steam: June 22, 2021; Nintendo Switch: July 15, 2021 iOS: March 3, 2022
- Genre: Adventure / Puzzle
- Mode: Single-player

=== Description ===
Labyrinth City: Pierre the Maze Detective is a videogame adaptation of the eponymous book series. It is developed by the Paris-based studio Darjeeling and published by Pixmain. The game was released for PC,Nintendo Switch and iOS in 2021.

It is directly based on the first book, Pierre the Maze Detective: The Search for the Stolen Maze Stone; following Pierre as he pursues his adversary Mr. X through Opera City after the theft of the Maze Stone, a magical artifact that to transforms its surroundings into mazes.

Players navigate the mazes, interact with characters, and search for hidden objects across ten levels. Each level is rendered in two-dimensional animation, replicating the book's art style, while introducing animation, music, and voice acting. The adaptation made for a more immersive world, giving names and dialogue to many of the minor background characters drawn in the books.

The videogame was first conceived when a Darjeeling staff member contacted IC4DESIGN after the success of the debut book, leading to a collaboration that Kamigaki later described as “surreal and humbling.” Kamigaki, who had previously worked in the gaming industry, noted that seeing his static illustrations animated on screen “made the effort worth it.”

=== Reception ===
The game received positive reviews and multiple awards for its art direction and faithful adaptation.

Critics praised faithful adaptation of the books’ dense but static scenes, into animated scenes, and for the accessible and exploration-focused gameplay. Eurogamer described it as “an absolute delight,” highlighting its “dense, lively worlds” and “book-like flatness.” PC Gamer said that readers could "peer at big, busy, colorful environments packed with weird comedic characters while soaking in lots of amazing little details."Rapid Review UK called it “a pleasant and soothing experience.” The game holds a Metacritic score of 81. Reviewers compared it to Where’s Wally? and noted its gentle humor and nostalgic appeal.

=== Awards and distinctions ===
- Game Connection Asia 2020 – Indie Development Awards: Winner, Best Quality of Art.
- IndieCade 2020 – Winner, Visual Design Award.
- IndiePlay China 2020 – Nominee, Best Overseas Game.
- Digital Dragons Indie Celebration 2021 – Finalist.
- Busan Indie Connect (BIC) Festival 2021 – Winner of the Jury Prize and Excellence in Art Award.
