= Autonomy: The Cover Designs of Anarchy 1961–1970 =

Book edited by Daniel Poyner

- Editor: Daniel Poyner
- Published: 2012
- Publisher: Hyphen Press
- Publication place: London
- Pages: 302
- ISBN: 978-0-907259-46-6

Autonomy: The Cover Designs of Anarchy 1961–1970 is a 2012 book edited by Daniel Poyner and published by Hyphen Press, which reproduces all of the cover designs by Rufus Segar of the British monthly anarchist magazine Anarchy from 1961 to 1970.

In his contribution to the book, graphic designer Richard Hollis observed: "Seen against a background of an emerging domination of the image in commercial media and rapid changes in technology, Anarchy's covers stand out as a significant record of the early years of graphic design in Britain."

In January 2013, design critic Rick Poynor, reviewed the book in the magazine Creative Review. He observed: "What the book sets out to do, and it succeeds magnificently without visual or verbal hyperbole, is to enrich and add nuance to our understanding of a 1960s graphic landscape we might think we know inside out by acquainting us with unfamiliar work that provided an important forward-thinking publication with its public face." Also in 2013, the book was shortlisted for the Bread and Roses Award. Academic Gideon Kossoff observed in his review of Autonomy:

Anarchy's covers arguably amount, over the course of its nine-year existence, to one of the most impressive series of pamphlet graphic design ever created. They are some of the few examples in the modern era of politically and socially committed graphic designes that are of high quality and consistently inventive. ... They are works that compare favorably with any series of printed or recorded publications, such as that of Reid Miles's Blue Note record covers, in which the style of artwork and typography at once express the spirit of the subject matter and reveal something important about the time and place of publication.
