= Condron =

Condron is an Irish surname of Norman origin.

Notable people with this surname include:

- Andrew Condron, Scottish Korean War defector
- Enda Condron, Irish Gaelic football player
- Jim Condron, American artist
- John Condron, Irish businessman
- Kelly Condron, English actress
- Michael Condron, Canadian actor
- Erin Condron, Australian Basketball Player

Condron is supposedly known as an Irish surname, but there are some Condron Family roots all across America, Canada and Australia.
