= Earl Hofmann =

American artist

Earl Francis Hofmann
- Born: March 11, 1928; Baltimore, Maryland, U.S.
- Died: September 29, 1992 (aged 64); Leonardtown, Maryland, U.S.
- Education: Maryland Institute College of Art, Jacques Maroger
- Known for: Painting

Earl Hofmann (March 11, 1928 – September 29, 1992) was a painter, sculptor, educator. Hofmann was one of Baltimore's realist artists, he was a significant part of the Baltimore art scene of the mid-20th century. Hofmann studied with and assisted Jacques Maroger at the Maryland Institute College of Art.

== Early life ==
Earl Hofmann's "Jean Betty" in the St. Mary's County Governmental Center, Leonardtown, Maryland

Earl Francis Hofmann was born in Baltimore, Maryland on March 11, 1928. He started painting at 12 and continued to develop his interest in art throughout his teenage years. Hofmann graduated Forest Park High School. After serving in the Marines he attended Maryland Institute College of Art where he studied and assisted Jacques Maroger until Maroger's death.

== Art career ==
In 1961, he and a group of Baltimore painters founded the Maroger Group and the Six Realists. Earl Hofmann was a respected teacher at Boys Latin School, the Baltimore County Public Schools, Charles County Community College, St. Mary's College of Maryland, and private classes. Hofmann painted and exhibited portraits, street scenes, still life, liturgical images, fantasy scenes, and murals, for individuals, commercial enterprises, churches, courthouses, and schools. The painting, "Jean Betty" is in the St. Mary's County Governmental Center.

== Major works ==
A mural featuring Historic Saint Mary's City in a timeline from the early 17th century to the late 20th century is part of a Smithsonian collection in the St. Mary's City Visitor Center. Murals and paintings by Earl Hofmann are on display in many places in Baltimore such as, Mercy Medical Center, St. Ignatius Church, St. Joseph Monastery, and the Basilica of Assumption.

== Education career ==
Hofmann taught for many years at the Maryland Institute College of Art. Then he moved to Southern Maryland and from 1970s to the early 1990s, he taught at the St. Mary's College of Maryland Public Honors College in Saint Mary's City, Maryland and continued painting, drawing and sculpting.

== Awards ==
Earl Hofmann won many art awards and became part of the New York City art scene at a young age. He won an award and representation at the Grand Central Art Galleries in 1951 in a juried competition which was judged by Edward Hopper. Hofmann informally studied with and assisted Reginald Marsh during the early 1950s. He was a frequent exhibitor at the Peale Museum in Baltimore, the Corcoran Gallery of Art Biennial, the Venice Biennial, the Guggenheim Traveling Exhibition, the Butler Institute of American Art, and the International Institute of Arts and Letters.

== Personal life ==
Earl Hofmann married Jean Nordstrom in 1949, and had four children in Baltimore, Maryland. They lived in Bolton Hill, a neighborhood that included the Maryland Institute College of Art and many other artist residents. The family moved to St. Mary's County, in Southern Maryland when Hofmann was appointed artist-in-residence at St. Mary's College of Maryland in 1971. Earl and Jean Hofmann lived in a house and studio they built in Hollywood, Maryland, not far from Leonardtown, Maryland. In 1992, the Hofmann family started a company called Pontifex Inc., which prepared and sold Earl Hofmann's formula of the Maroger Italian Medium.

Hofmann died of lung cancer on September 29, 1992, at St. Mary's Hospital in Leonardtown, St. Mary's County, Maryland.
