= Jen Stark =

American artist (born 1983)

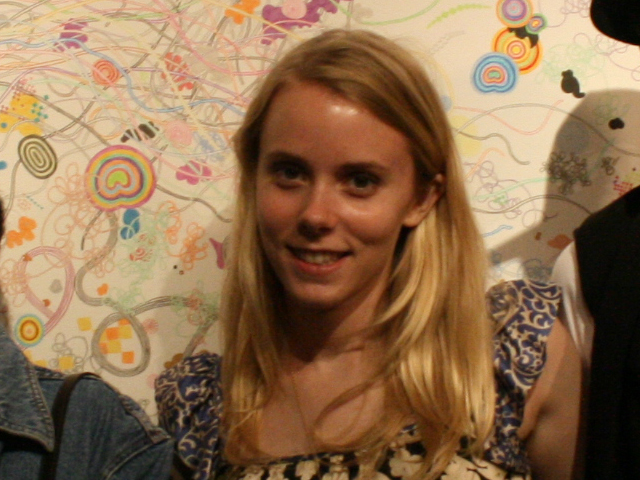
- Jen Stark in 2008
- Born: 1983 (age 42–43); Miami, Florida, U.S.
- Known for: contemporary art, installation art, sculpture, public art
- Movement: contemporary art, installation art
- Website: www.jenstark.com

Jen Stark (born 1983 in Miami, Florida) is a multi-media American artist who lives and works in Los Angeles, California. Stark is best known for creating optical art using psychedelic colors in patterns and drips that mimic intricate motifs found in nature. On March 26, 2021, Stark became a notable NFT maker when Farzin Fardin Fard (3fmusic) won a bid to buy her piece Multiverse for 150 Ethereum.

== Early life ==
Stark earned a BFA from Maryland Institute College of Art in 2005, majoring in fibers with a minor in animation.

While studying abroad, Stark could not afford expensive art supplies so she purchased colored construction paper and started to experiment with it. Eventually, working with paper would become a hallmark of Stark's practice.

== Bodies of Work ==
Cosmic Shift, 2015, hand-cut acid-free colored paper, foam board, glue, acrylic paint, wood, varnish, 37 x 24 x 25 in.

Stark is known for her repetitive, intricate sculptures which often resemble patterns in nature. Stark's hypnotic work embraces replication as it mimics plant growth, evolution, topographical maps, infinity, fractals and the geometry of the universe. Although Stark is most recognized for her paper sculptures, she has explored a variety of media including wood, paint, mirrors, metal, and animation. Her signature creations combine a variety of materials that have acted as a catalyst for more established spiritual proclivity as expressed through hypnotic mandala-like configurations.

=== Sculpture ===
In addition to operating in a two-dimensional format, Stark migrates her aesthetic into three-dimensional sculpture. In 2019, the artist transformed the Joshua Liner Gallery in New York City from a typical white-cube gallery into a kaleidoscope of color and optical mass. The work in this solo exhibition illustrates Stark's interest in concepts such as, optical illusions, The Fibonacci Sequence, fractals, and Riemannian geometry that explores the theory of curved space in the flat universe.

Jen Stark sitting with her dog Zelda, in front of her painting Organic Drip, 2016.

=== Public Art and Murals ===
Stark has completed outdoor and indoor murals throughout the country, ranging from Culver City to Fort Lauderdale to Montauk. In 2014, Stark created a vinyl interior of a bathroom inside Gagosian Gallery in Beverly Hills and the following year she painted a mural surrounding multiple connected office walls at the Facebook Headquarters in Menlo Park.

In 2020, Stark created a large-scale public art installation in Downtown Los Angeles called "Light Spectrum" out of translucent vinyl pigmented in psychedelic colors. The vinyl material casts a prism onto the ground as the sun transitions throughout the day.

=== Animation ===
Stark has created animations since 2005, at which point she made films entirely from intricately cut paper. In 2015, Stark was invited to create original artwork and animations for the 32nd MTV Video Music Awards.

== Corporate Collaborations ==
Stark has collaborated with corporate partners, lending her design to product packaging. In 2018, she worked with makeup company Smashbox to design a holiday collection called Holidaze. That same year, Stark offered several of her designs for Vans sneakers. In 2019, Stark created designs for Las Jaras Wines. In 2023, Stark collaborated with Skechers to create a limited-edition shoe collection with three unique designs. In 2026 Jen Stark worked with Samsung creating art for their TVs.

== Museum Collections and Exhibition History ==
Stark's work is collected worldwide, notably by the Smithsonian American Art Museum in Washington, D.C.; the Miami International Airport in Miami, Florida; the Museum of Contemporary Art, North Miami, Florida; The West Collection in Oaks, Pennsylvania; and the Crystal Bridges Museum of American Art in Bentonville, Arkansas.

In 2019, Stark had a solo show called "Color Cascade" at the Schneider Museum of Art in Ashland, Oregon. The exhibition featured work made from a range of materials, including wood, paper and motion and sound activated animation. In March 2021, Stark was one of three artists to participate in "Light the Night," a group exhibition featuring animations that were projected onto buildings in downtown Fort Lauderdale. Stark's work was projected on the NSU Art Museum Fort Lauderdale.
