= Anarchy (magazine) =

British anarchist magazine, 1961–1970

- Cover of Anarchy 14 on Disobedience
- Editor: Colin Ward
- Categories: Political philosophy
- Frequency: Monthly
- Publisher: Freedom Press
- First issue: March 1961
- Final issue: 1970
- Based in: London
- Language: English
- ISSN: 0003-2751
- OCLC: 222887480

Anarchy was an anarchist monthly magazine which was produced from March 1961 until December 1970. It was founded and edited by anarchist Colin Ward, and was published by Freedom Press in London.

David Goodway observed in his book Anarchist Seeds Beneath the Snow that Ward urged the case to his fellow editors for a 'more reflective' Freedom, to which they eventually responded 'by giving him his head with the monthly Anarchy from March 1961'. The magazine included articles on anarchism and reflections on current events from an anarchist perspective, e.g. workers' control, criminology and squatting. It published contributions from established authors such as Marie Louise Berneri, Murray Bookchin, Stanley Cohen, Paul Goodman, George Woodcock and Nicholas Walter. From Issue Six onwards, graphic designer and illustrator Rufus Segar became the resident art director of the magazine. Ward gave him significant freedom in his design of each issue, albeit while working to a tight deadline. (Note: The cover designs for all of the issues are reproduced in Autonomy: The Cover Designs of Anarchy 1961‒1970 (Poyner 2012).)

Goodway commended Anarchy's 'simple excellence', which he supported by citing the British Marxist historian and author Raphael Samuel:

'The editing, according to an admiring, though not uncritical contributor [Nicholas Walter], was minimal: nothing was rewritten, nothing even subbed. "Colin almost didn't do anything. He didn't muck it about, didn't really bother to read the proofs. Just shoved them all in. Just let it happen."'

In his contribution Change of editor in Issue 118 (December 1970) of the magazine, Ward announced that it was the last issue under his editorship and that the new editor would be fellow anarchist Graham Moss. The second series of Anarchy was published into the 1980s with an editorship that subsequently included Charlotte Baggins, Chris Broad and Phil Ruff. Freedom Press later published A Decade of Anarchy 1961–1970: Selections from the Monthly Journal Anarchy, which collected writing from the first series.

The 2012 book, Autonomy: The Cover Designs of Anarchy 1961–1970, features all the covers designed by Segar.
