= Patrick O'Brien (artist) =

American artist and writer (born 1960)

- Born: Patrick Lyons O'Brien; July 5, 1960 (age 66); Boston, Massachusetts, U.S.
- Education: University of Virginia
- Occupations: Artist; writer
- Writing career
- Genre: Children's literature

Patrick Lyons O’Brien (born July 5, 1960) is an American artist and writer, known for his children's books and for his maritime paintings. The National Maritime Historical Society awarded O’Brien their Distinguished Service Award for his body of artwork in 2012.

== Biography ==
Patrick O’Brien was born in Boston. In 1982 O'Brien earned a degree in biology from the University of Virginia. He then became a full-time artist in the mid 1980s. In 2011 O’Brien began teaching as a part-time faculty member at The Maryland Institute College of Art. He lives in Baltimore, MD. O'Brien is not related to the well-known British author Patrick O’Brian (1914-2000,) but because he is a writer, and works in a similar genre, there is often confusion between the two authors. In 2024, he was named president of the American Society of Marine Artists.

== Children's books ==
O’Brien is the author and illustrator of 12 children's books, and the illustrator of 6 others. His first book was published in 1995. Most of his books are non-fiction. His specialty is prehistoric animals and historical subjects such as knights, pirates and trains.

O’Brien has also illustrated a series of sci-fi adventure tales featuring dinosaurs in space, the Captain Raptor series. Publishers Weekly says "the series combines Jurassic Park, Star Trek and Captain Nemo, balancing tongue-in-cheek cheesiness with earnest enthusiasm". The Washington Post described it as "what most small boys would agree is the perfect book" and described the art as "just plain beautiful".

In 2017 O'Brien published You Are The First Kid on Mars (Putnam, 2009.) Publishers Weekly said of the book, “O'Brien takes an inventive leap into the future... Made captivatingly real by stunning digital art, this intriguing vision of space exploration should set imaginations soaring.” A copy of the book was launched into space aboard a SpaceX rocket in August, 2017 and delivered to The International Space Station, as part of a program called Story Time From Space.

== Marine art ==
In 2003 O’Brien began painting maritime scenes. He specializes in historic scenes from the age of sail. O’Brien does extensive research to ensure that each painting is historically and nautically accurate.

In 2011 The U. S. Coast Guard commissioned O’Brien to create three paintings of historic Coast Guard vessels. One of the painting hangs in the main cabin aboard the USCG EAGLE.

ExxonMobil commissioned several paintings depicting newly built supertankers. In 2009 The Gaylord National Resort at The National Harbor in Maryland commissioned two very large maritime paintings for their lobby. The U. S. Naval Institute has commissioned several paintings for covers of their magazine Naval History, including a large painting of The Battle of the Chesapeake.

=== Exhibitions ===
In 2008 The Union League Club in New York City hosted a solo-exhibition of O’Brien's work entitled New York in the Age of Sail.

In 2010 The U. S. Naval Academy Museum mounted a solo-exhibition of O’Brien's work featuring twenty-eight oil paintings. The paintings were loaned by collectors from around the country.

O’Brien has exhibited regularly since 2004 at the annual Mystic International Marine Art Exhibition.

In 2010 at the Enoch Pratt Free Library in Baltimore, MD, mounted an exhibition featuring O’Brien's artwork. The exhibit was called Space, Sword and Dinosaurs, the Creation of Art for Children’s Books.

In 2017 several pieces of O’Brien's artwork were included in an exhibition of artwork from children's books at The National Academy of Sciences in Washington DC.

In 2007 O’Brien had a solo exhibition of his paintings in Portsmouth, VA. The exhibit was entitled The Civil War at Sea.

=== Awards ===
In 2012 The National Maritime Historical Society awarded O’Brien their Distinguished Service Award for his body of artwork.

In 2015 O’Brien was awarded the Schaefer Maritime Heritage Award at the Mystic International Marine Art Exhibition at the Mystic Seaport Museum in Connecticut.

In 2010 the Mystic Seaport Museum awarded O’Brien their Museum Purchase Award, which means the museum bought O’Brien's painting for its permanent collection.

== Selected works ==
=== Books written and illustrated by O'Brien ===
- The Making of a Knight, 1998
- Gigantic!, 1999
- Steam, Smoke and Steel, 2000
- The Hindenburg, 2000
- Megatooth, 2001
- The Great Ships, 2001
- Mammoth, 2002
- Fantastic Flights, 2003
- Duel of the Ironclads, 2003
- The Mutiny of the Bounty, 2007
- Sabertooth, 2008
- You Are the First Kid on Mars, 2009

=== Books written by O'Brien and Kevin O'Malley, and illustrated by O'Brien. ===
- Captain Raptor and the Moon Mystery, 2005
- Captain Raptor and the Space Pirates, 2007
