= Blob emoji =

Set of emoji by Google

Range of blob emoji expressions

Blob emoji is an implementation of emojis made by Google featured in it's Android mobile operating system between 2013 and 2017.

== History ==
Google introduced the blobs, created by Japanese design studio IC4DESIGN, as part of its Android KitKat mobile operating system in 2013 as a way of redesigning the original emojis. Prior to 2013, Android's emojis referenced the Android mascot, which some referred to as "antenna-eared doppelgangers".

As Unicode, the group that establishes emoji standards, introduced skin tone and gender options to emojis, they thought that if the people wanted the emojis to have different colors, they would look strange as blobs. Throughout the years, the blobs slowly switched to a more human shape.

The Happy emoji in Google blob emoji font

Google retired the blobs in 2017 with the release of Android Oreo in favor of circular emojis, designed by Jennifer Daniel, similar in style to that of other platforms. Consistent cross-platform emoji interpretation was among the redesign's primary aims. The redesign, which had been in development for about a year, mimicked an Apple effort to include more detail in the emoji glyph and offer yellow skin tone as the default.

Despite their deprecation, Google's Gmail continued to use the blob emojis, as of 2022, and Google reintroduced the blob emoji in Gboard's Emoji Kitchen feature, which lets users combine two emojis into one pictograph (sticker). Blobs are also used to represent people in the Noto Emoji font.

== Reception ==
The blob emoji were a divisive feature between 2013 and 2017. Proponents praised their novel interpretation of emoji ideograms while detractors criticized the miscommunication that results when emoji are interpreted differently across platforms.

In 2018, Google released sticker packs featuring blob emoji for Gboard and Android Messages.
