= Robin Kinross =

Robin Kinross (born 1949) is an author and publisher on the topic of visual communication and typography. His most significant work is Modern Typography. He is a proprietor of Hyphen Press, which published books on design and typography from 1980 to 2017.

Kinross did undergraduate and graduate studies at the Department of Typography & Graphic Communication at the University of Reading. His graduate work from 1979 was titled Otto Neurath's contribution to visual communication 1925-45: the history, graphic language and theory of Isotype, but stayed unpublished. He moved to London in 1982. In the 1980s he contributed content to publications such as Blueprint, Baseline and Eye.

Kinross started Hyphen Press in 1980. Modern Typography was published in 1992. Beginning in the 1990s, Hyphen produced about "two to four publications a year". Important publications by Hyphen include Christopher Burke's Paul Renner and Fred Smeijers' Counterpunch. Hyphen's last published title was Richard Hollis designs for the Whitechapel: a graphic designer and an art gallery at work in twentieth-century London by Christopher Wilson, published in 2017.

== Modern Typography ==
Modern Typography: An Essay in Critical History is a critical history of printing and typography. Kinross asserts that modernism in typography emerged with the self-awareness of printing and the development of the rationality of its processes and tools. Kinross dates these emerging attitudes to around 1700 and then traces the evolution of modernist typography. According to Matthew Carter, "Most histories of typography, particularly British ones, have been histories of traditional typography that treat Modernism as an aberration. Studies of Modernism, for their part, have tended to isolate it from contemporary traditional typography. This book aims to break down that separation by considering issues other than visual appearance, and by avoiding the ‘bibliophilic nostalgia’ so prevalent in typographic culture." The book takes some inspiration in title and treatment from Kenneth Frampton's Modern Architecture: A Critical History.

== See also ==
- Interview with Robin Kinross by Rick Poynor for Eye magazine
- Interview with Robin Kinross online at Hyphen Press
- Review of Modern Typography and Designing Books online at Typographica
- Review of Modern Typography by Matthew Carter online at Eye

== Bibliography ==
- Kinross, Robin, Modern Typography: An Essay in Critical History, Hyphen Press, 1992.
- Hochuli, Jost, and Robin Kinross, Designing Books: Practice and Theory, 1996.
- Kinross, Robin, Unjustified Texts: Perspectives on Typography, 2002.
- Bailey, Stuart and Robin Kinross, God’s Amateur: The Writing of E.C. Large, 2009.
- Neurath, Marie, and Robin Kinross, The Transformer: Principles of Making Isotype Charts, 2009.
