= Jim Condron =

American artist

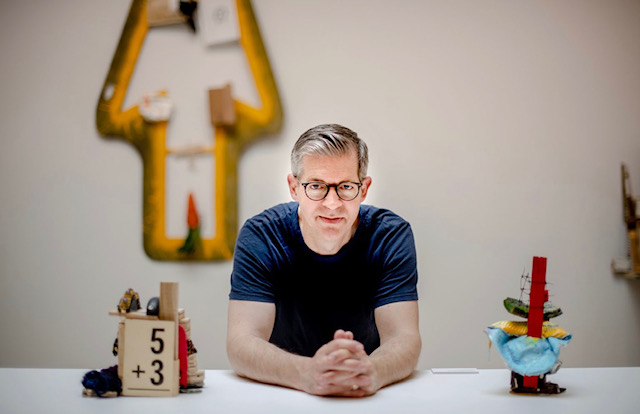
- Jim Condron, 2023
- Born: January 4, 1970 (age 56); Long Island, NY, U.S.
- Education: Bachelor of Arts, Colby College; Master of Fine Arts, Maryland Institute College of Art
- Known for: Painting, Sculpture, Mixed Media

Jim Condron is an American artist working in painting and sculpture. He lives and works in Brooklyn, NY and Baltimore, MD.

== Early life and education ==
Originally from Long Island, NY and Connecticut, Condron earned a Bachelor of Arts in Art and English from Colby College in Waterville, ME. He then began a career in investment banking, but resigned his position to attend The New York Studio School. Condron relocated to Baltimore and went on to earn his Master of Fine Arts at the Hoffberger School of Painting at the Maryland Institute College of Art in 2004.

== Painting and sculpture ==
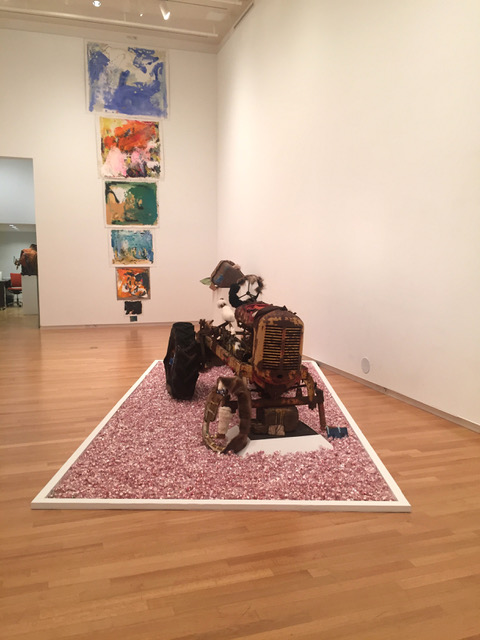
"Diminishing Returns" installed at Goucher College, 2018

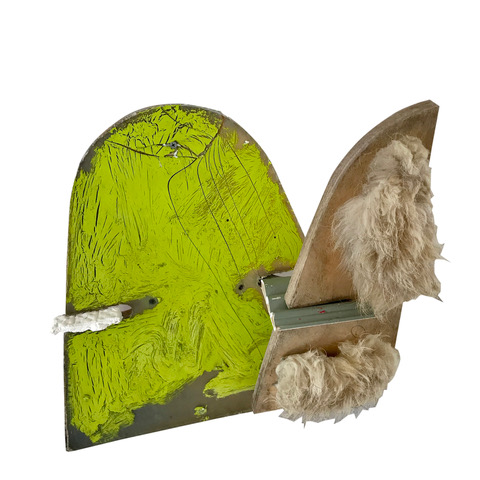
Jim Condron; "Conscience and cowardice are really the same thing;" 17x17x8 inches; oil, resin, fur, plaster, pencil, wood; 2019

Condron works in a "bold abstract style" referred to as "contemporary Dada" that fuses painting and sculpture. J. Susan Isaacs has noted: "Through his combination of the absurd with the sublime, Condron explores narratives not only specific to being an artist but also those shared by all of us. The balancing of the serious with the comedic is one of the strengths of Condron’s work." Associate Editor of The New Criterion Andrew L. Shea observes that Condron's process sees him "taking fragments of personal experience and translating them into a more universal idea through form."

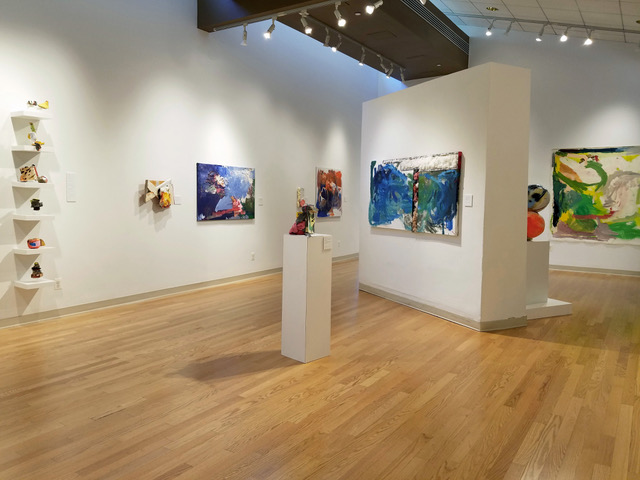
Installation View of "Picking Up the Pieces" at Loyola University, Maryland

Condron's early works were primarily oil paintings in an Impressionistic style, such as those displayed in an exhibition at the Frederick Douglass-Isaac Myers Maritime Park and Museum in 2010. In 2013, Condron reached a point where he grew "completely sick of painting in general; sick of all my tired ideas of what it meant to be a painter." He then began to work in a new process in which he fused mixed media installations with painting and sculpture to form Postmodern "collage-paintings," in a style reminiscent of Robert Rauschenberg's "Combines." These works often feature "explosive contrasts of color, from hot pink to red to various shades of blue and brown." Condron's works are given titles excerpted (without attribution) from literature by authors such as Don De Lillo, Hunter S. Thompson, Kurt Vonnegut, Ernest Hemingway, and others. Uniquely, Condron's collages tend to contain objects that have some sentimental value (rather than simply "found objects"), forming connections that are "at once banal and poignant." Condron debuted these assemblages in a solo exhibition at the Fireplace Project at the Surf Lodge in Montauk, NY and in a joint exhibition with painter Kristin Liu, Your Memories, Your Sentiments, Your Wishes, Your Secrets, at Adah Rose Gallery in 2015.

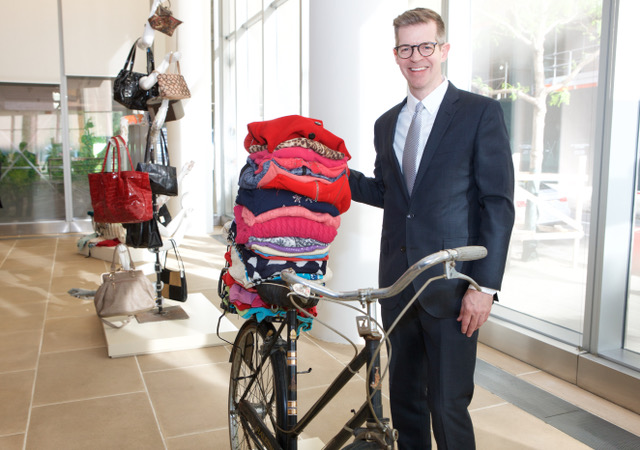
Condron poses with his sculpture "Close to You" at 2019 Wings Over Wall Street Gala

In 2019, Condron installed 10 sculptures at the Muscular Dystrophy Association's "Wings Over Wall Street" event, in honor of his mother Karen Condron, who died from ALS in July 2018. The artworks combined clothing from his mother's wardrobe with items from Condron's childhood to form deeply personal abstract sculptures that "express the great complexity of nostalgia and embody [the artist's] deep grief."

== Awards and residencies ==
Condron has been a recipient of a Pollock-Krasner Foundation grant (where he received the foundation's highest award), an Adolf and Esther Gottlieb Foundation grant, and a Maryland State Arts Council grant for sculpture, among several other grants and awards; he was also named a finalist for 2022 Bethesda Painting Awards. He has been awarded residencies at Art Cake, Brooklyn, NY;The New York Studio School Sculpture Space, Dumbo, NY; The Heliker La Hotan Foundation, Great Cranberry Island, ME; The Edward F. Albee Foundation, Montauk, NY; and the Virginia Center for the Creative Arts, Amherst, VA.

Condron's most recent academic lectures include a conversation with American painter Amy Sherald. He also continues to exhibit his work regularly at galleries, museums, universities, and art fairs.

== Public collections ==
Selected public collections include:

- Basil & Elise Goulandris Foundation, Museum of Contemporary Art, Andros, Greece
- Long Beach Museum of Art, Long Beach, CA
- Cedar Rapids Museum of Art, Cedar Rapids, IA
- American Visionary Art Museum, Baltimore, MD
- Frederick Douglass Isaac Myers Maritime Museum, Baltimore, MD
- Lewis Glucksman Gallery, University College Cork, Ireland
- Gakushuin University, Tokyo, Japan
- Harvard University, Cambridge, MA
- Johns Hopkins University, Baltimore, MD
- Colby College, Waterville, ME
- Loyola University Maryland, Baltimore, MD
- Stevenson University, Owings Mills, MD
- Ellen Noel Art Museum, Odessa, TX

== Selected exhibitions ==
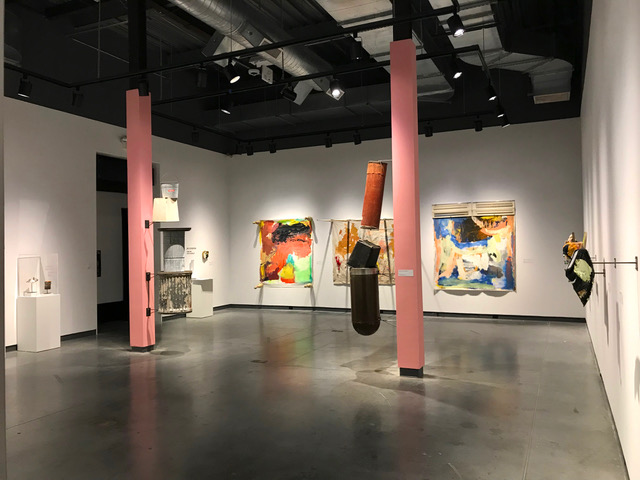
Installation View of "Trash Talk" at the Delaware Contemporary Museum

- 2023 Collected Things, Art Cake, Brooklyn, NY
- 2019 Trash Talk, The Delaware Contemporary, Wilmington, DE
- 2019 You Never Wash it Off Completely, Wilson College, Chambersburg, Pennsylvania
- 2019 Parenting: An Art Without a Manual, American Visionary Art Museum, Baltimore, MD
- 2018 Jim Condron: Diminishing Returns, Goucher College, Baltimore, MD
- 2017 Picking Up Pieces, Loyola University Maryland, Baltimore, MD
- 2015 Untitled, Stevenson University, Stevenson, MD
- 2015 Your Memories, Your Sentiments, Your Wishes, Your Secrets, Adah Rose Gallery, Kensington, MD
- 2014 Pulse Miami (with Adah Rose Gallery)
