= Jennifer Daniel (illustrator) =

American artist, designer and art director

- Education: Maryland Institute College of Art (2004)
- Known for: Emoji, illustration, graphic design
- Website: jenniferdanielalloneword.com

Jennifer Daniel is an American graphic designer and art director known for her work involving emoji. She is the chair of the Emoji Standard and Research Working Group for the Unicode Consortium, and holds a position at Google. She previously worked as a graphics editor at The New York Times and Bloomberg Businessweek.

== Early life and education ==
Jennifer Daniel grew up in Kansas and was on her high school's debate team. Her father works in the picture frame industry, and her mother studied zoology. As a teenager, she began a lifelong journaling practice in a sketchbook form, with quotes and memories alongside grid drawings. From 2000 to 2004, Daniel attended the Maryland Institute College of Art, where she studied graphic design under artists including Abbot Miller, Ellen Lupton, and Nicholas Blechman. After Blechman asked to take a poster from Daniel's portfolio, she asked him for an internship and he agreed.

Daniel interned at Blechman's office in New York City every summer in college, and lived in her grandmother's attic in Flushing. She later described herself as nervous during the first internship, and said she was moved from her initial phone assignment after struggling to say names. She has stated: "I was there for three months, and for the first two I never asked for the bathroom key because I didn't know where it was. I just pretended like I didn't have to pee", and said she "just waited until someone else had to pee and then I snuck into the bathroom after them."

== Career ==
Soon after Daniel graduated in 2004, she answered a call from Blechman to join him at The New York Times as his assistant. She later worked as a freelance artist. In 2010, she became a graphics editor for Bloomberg Businessweek, where art director Richard Turley said "We have this insanely good graphics director called Jennifer Daniel who we kind of stumbled on accidentally. She’s just kind of crazy. She doesn’t respond to briefs in the same way as a lot of people do. She doesn’t really have a very conventional head on her shoulders." Daniel later worked as a graphics editor for The New York Times. She has taught creative writing at the School of Visual Arts in New York City. From September 2009 to July 2011, she worked in a studio space at the Pencil Factory in Greenpoint, Brooklyn. In 2016, Daniel began a role at Google.

She serves as the Expressions Creative Director for Android and Google in addition to her work for the Unicode Consortium. In 2022, she introduced an emoji font. She is a member of the Art Director's Club. Her work has been recognized by the Society of Illustrators.

=== Unicode and emoji work ===
Daniel is known for her work in emoji development. Her first contribution to Unicode Standard was standardizing gender inclusive representations in emoji. She created the Mx Claus, Woman in Tuxedo, Man in Veil and 30 other gender-inclusive emoji. She has authored and co-authored over two dozen emoji including: 🫠🥲🫢🫣🫡🫥😶‍🌫️😮‍💨🫨🙂‍↔️🙂‍↕️😵‍💫🫤🫪🥹❤️‍🔥❤️‍🩹🩷🩵🩶🫯🫱🫲🫰🫱🏿‍🫲🏻🫦🧔‍♂️🧔‍♀️🧑‍🦰🧑‍⚕️🥷🫅🤵‍♂️🤵‍♀️👰‍♂️👰‍♀️🫄🧑‍🍼🧑‍🎄🧑‍🦯🧑‍🩰👯🏿💑🏿🫂🪽🐦‍🔥🪷🪻🍄‍🟫🫗🛘🪮🪫⛓️‍💥🫧⚧️

=== Writing ===
Daniel has created or illustrated various books, including the 2015 picture book Space! by Simon Rogers, which presents scientific information about the universe in a series of graphics. In 2016, she published The Origin of (Almost) Everything, which contains an introduction from Stephen Hawking. She illustrated the 2017 book How to Be Human.

== Personal life ==
In 2015, Daniel gave birth to twins and moved to the San Francisco Bay Area.
