= Maryland Institute College of Art =

Private college in Baltimore, Maryland, US

Maryland Institute College of Art (MICA)
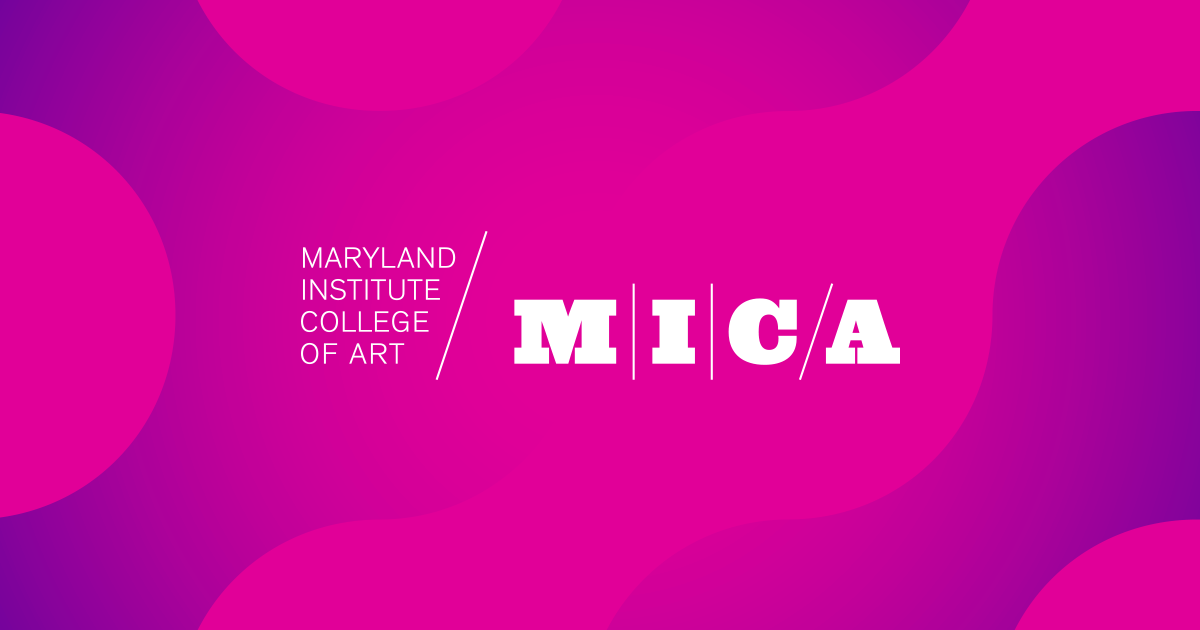
- Former name: Maryland Institute for the Promotion of the Mechanic Arts
- Type: Private art school
- Established: 1826; 200 years ago
- Affiliations: AICAD
- Endowment: $119.4 million (2024)
- President: Cecilia McCormick
- Faculty: 178 full-time 433 part-time
- Students: 2,128
- Undergraduates: 1,824
- Postgraduates: 379
- Location: Baltimore, Maryland, United States
- Campus: Urban, 1.5 miles (2.4 km)
- Colors: Blue & Yellow (traditionally) Green & Pink (more recently)
- Website: mica.edu

The Maryland Institute College of Art (MICA) is a private art and design college in Baltimore, Maryland. Founded in 1826 as the Maryland Institute for the Promotion of the Mechanic Arts, it is regarded as one of the oldest art colleges in the United States.

MICA is a member of the Association of Independent Colleges of Art and Design (AICAD), a consortium of US art schools. The college hosts pre-college, post-baccalaureate, continuing studies, Master of Fine Arts, and Bachelor of Fine Arts programs, as well as young peoples' studio art classes.

== History ==
"The Maryland Institute", above the old "Centre Market" on Market Place between East Baltimore Street and Water Street, east of South Frederick Street and west of the Jones Falls stream, home of M.I., 1851–1904

=== Maryland Institute for the Promotion of the Mechanic Arts ===
The Maryland Institute for the Promotion of the Mechanic Arts was established by prominent citizens of Baltimore, such as Fielding Lucas Jr. (founder of Lucas Brothers - office supply company), John H. B. Latrobe (lawyer, artist, author, civic leader), Hezekiah Niles (founder of national newspaper Niles Weekly Register) and Thomas Kelso.

Other leaders and officers in that first decade were William Stewart (president), George Warner, and Fielding Lucas Jr. (vice presidents), John Mowton (recording secretary), Dr. William Howard (corresponding secretary), as well as James H. Clarke and D.P. McCoy (managers), Solomon Etting (local merchant/political leader), Benjamin C. Howard, William Hubbard, William Meeter, William Roney, William F. Small, S.D. Walker, John D. Craig, Jacob Deems, William H. Freeman, Moses Hand, William Krebs, Robert Cary Long Jr. (architect), Peter Leary, James Mosher, Henry Payson (founder of First Unitarian Church), P. K. Stapleton, James Sykes and P. B. Williams. The General Assembly of Maryland incorporated the institute in 1826, and starting in November of that year (Tuesday, November 7, 1826), exhibitions of articles of American manufacture were held in the "Concert Hall" on South Charles Street. A course of lectures on subjects connected with the mechanic arts was inaugurated, and a library of works on mechanics and the sciences was begun.

The school operated for a decade at "The Athenaeum" (the first of two structures to bear that name, a landmark for educational, social, cultural, civic and political affairs) at the southwest corner of East Lexington and St. Paul Streets facing the second Baltimore City/County Courthouse between North Calvert and St. Paul Streets. This first Athenaeum was destroyed by fire on February 7, 1835, along with all of its property and records. The fire was caused by a bank riot due to the financial panic following the collapse of several Baltimore banks.

In November 1847, Benjamin S. Benson and sixty-nine others (including many of the original founders of the former institute), issued a call for a meeting of those favorable to the formation of a mechanics' institute, which resulted in the reopening of the institute on January 12, 1848.

The first annual exhibition was held at "Washington Hall" in October 1848, followed by two more. The 1848 officers were John A. Rodgers – president, Adam Denmead – first vice president, James Milholland – second vice president, John B. Easter – recording secretary, and Samuel Boyd – treasurer. The institute was reincorporated by the state legislature at their December session in 1849 and was endowed by an annual appropriation from the State of Maryland of five hundred dollars. In 1849, the Board of Managers extended the usefulness and broadened the appeal of its programs to ordinary citizens by opening a School of Design and an additional Night School of Design was extended two years later in the new hall and building, under William Minifie (from the Faculty of the old Central High School of Baltimore) as principal of the reorganized institute. Classes resumed in rented space over the downtown Baltimore branch of the U.S. Post Office Department in the "Merchants Exchange".

The City Council in 1850 passed an ordinance granting the institute permission to erect a new building over a reconstructed "Centre Market", laying the cornerstone on March 13, 1851, with John H. B. Latrobe, and son of national architect Benjamin Henry Latrobe, (1764–1820).

In 1851, the institute moved to its own building, built above the old Centre Market on Market Place (formerly Harrison Street) between East Baltimore Street (to the north) and Water Street (to the south) alongside the western shore of the Jones Falls. Centre Market continued to be known in the city as "Marsh Market" after the former Harrison's Marsh from colonial times. The building covered an entire block and had two stories built on a series of brick arches above the market, with two clock towers at each end. The second floor with the institute, housed classrooms, offices, shops and studios and one of the largest assembly halls/auditorium in the state.

During this period the institute added a School of Chemistry, thanks in part to a bequest from philanthropist George Peabody, (1795–1869), (for which the Peabody Institute and George Peabody Library is named) and B.& O. Railroad president Thomas Swann, along with a School of Music. Night classes for Design are added for men who work during the day, but would like training in Architecture and Engineering at night. In 1854, a Day School of Design opened for women—one of the first US arts programs for women. In 1860, the Day School for men opened, and in 1870, the Day school became co-ed.

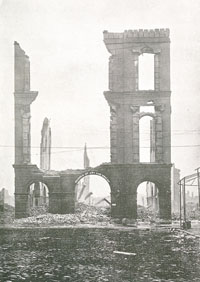
The Maryland institute, after the 1904 Fire

For 79 years the institute remained in the location above the Centre Market, and its "Great Hall", large enough to accommodate 6,000, attracted many famous speakers and lecturers. It hosted events and shows related to the arts, and as one of Baltimore's largest halls, it hosted important events to the city and the region. In 1852, it hosted both of the national political conventions to nominate presidential candidates Winfield Scott and his opponent Franklin Pierce (who was later elected 14th president of the United States).

During the American Civil War, the institute was briefly an armory for the Union and a hospital for soldiers wounded at the Battle of Antietam. On April 18, 1864, President Abraham Lincoln gave his famous speech known as the "Baltimore Address" (or "Liberty Speech") during a Sanitary Fair held in the Great Hall to benefit Union soldiers and families.

On February 7–8, 1904, the Centre Market and the Maryland Institute burned down along with 1,500 other buildings in downtown Baltimore during the Great Baltimore Fire. Temporarily, classes moved to spaces above other covered municipal markets in the city, while construction was ongoing in two locations. Michael Jenkins donated the future site of the "Main Building" on Mount Royal Avenue near the new Bolton Hill neighborhood in the northwest, which opened in 1908. It was to house the School of Art and Design, and the City of Baltimore offered the old site and funding to rebuild the Centre Market as a location for the Drafting school and "mechanical arts".

Upon opening, the Main building had spaces for pottery, metal working, wood carving, free-hand drafting and textile design, as well as a library, galleries and exhibition rooms. The galleries and exhibition rooms were important, because at the time of construction, Baltimore had no public art museum (institutions such as the Walters Art Gallery were not founded and opened for regular public viewing until 1909 and acquired by the city in 1934, and the Baltimore Museum of Art, in 1914).

In 1923, the institute's galleries hosted the first known public showing of Henri Matisse's work in the United States, brought from Europe by sisters Claribel and Etta Cone. In 1928, the new Centre Market building, now known as "The Market Place" building, offered a course in Aeronautics theory and drafting following the great excitement and increase in interest in the industry following Charles Lindbergh's flight over the Atlantic Ocean to Paris.

=== Maryland Institute, College of Art ===
The institute legally changed its name to the "Maryland Institute, College of Art" in 1959, and the "Market Place Building" was razed to make room for the extension south of the Jones Falls Expressway (Interstate 83). The consolidation of MICA to the Mount Royal campus was furthered by the purchase of the Mount Royal Station, a former Baltimore and Ohio Railroad (B&O) train station, in 1964. In 1968, MICA was forced to close due to the Baltimore riot of 1968, which broke out two days after the April 4 assassination of Martin Luther King Jr. in Memphis, Tennessee.

From 1972 to 1975, MICA was graced with the presence of artists and critics of the period, including composer John Cage, poet Allen Ginsberg, photographer Walker Evans, master printer Kenneth E. Tyler, painter Elaine de Kooning and art critic Clement Greenberg.

In the following years, MICA expanded along Mount Royal Avenue, adding the "Fox Building" in 1978, the "College Center" (now the "Art Tech Center") in 1986, a renovation of the "Main Building" in 1990, "The Commons" (added 1992), "Bunting Center" (1998), the "Meyerhoff House" (2002), the "Brown Center" (2003), the "Studio Center" (2007) and "The Gateway" (2008). During that time, the college focused on increased interaction with the international art world—offering study abroad programs and residences in numerous countries around the world.

The school's logo was redesigned in 2007 by Abbott Miller of Pentagram and is said to be a "visual reference to the architecture" found at the 1907 Main Building and 2003 Brown Center.

== Academics ==
MICA offers various undergraduate degree, graduate degrees and certificates including B.F.A., M.A., M.A.T., M.B.A., M.F.A., M.P.S. Some of the degree programs are partially online or fully online. The school has accreditation from Middle States Commission on Higher Education (MSCHE) since 1967, and National Association of Schools of Art and Design (NASAD) since 1948.

In the Fall 2017 term, there were 433 part-time faculty and 178 full-time faculty, with an 8 to 1 student-to-faculty ratio.

== Students and alumni ==
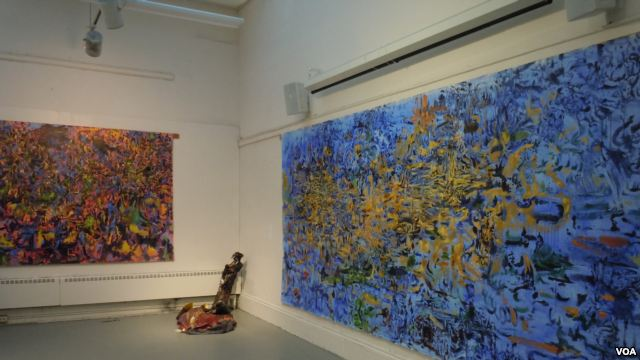
Student art exhibit, May 2012

In Fall 2017, the total student enrollment was 2,128, with 1,824 undergraduate students and 379 graduate students hailing from across the US and foreign countries. The student body in Fall 2017 was 75% female and 25% male. MICA has an acceptance rate of 62% in 2017.

86% of B.F.A. graduates who take jobs immediately after graduation are working in art related fields; 23% of MICA's B.F.A. graduates pursue graduate study immediately after graduation.

From 2009 to 2017, 14 MICA graduates received Fulbright awards for study abroad and five students earned the Jacob Javits Fellowship for graduate study. Since 2003, two alumni have received the national Jack Kent Cooke Foundation Graduate Scholarship and three Jack Kent Cooke Foundation scholars chose to study at MICA. Additionally, four alumni were awarded Elizabeth Greenshields Foundation Grants.

== Facilities ==
MICA's campus is a mixture of buildings from different periods of Baltimore's development.

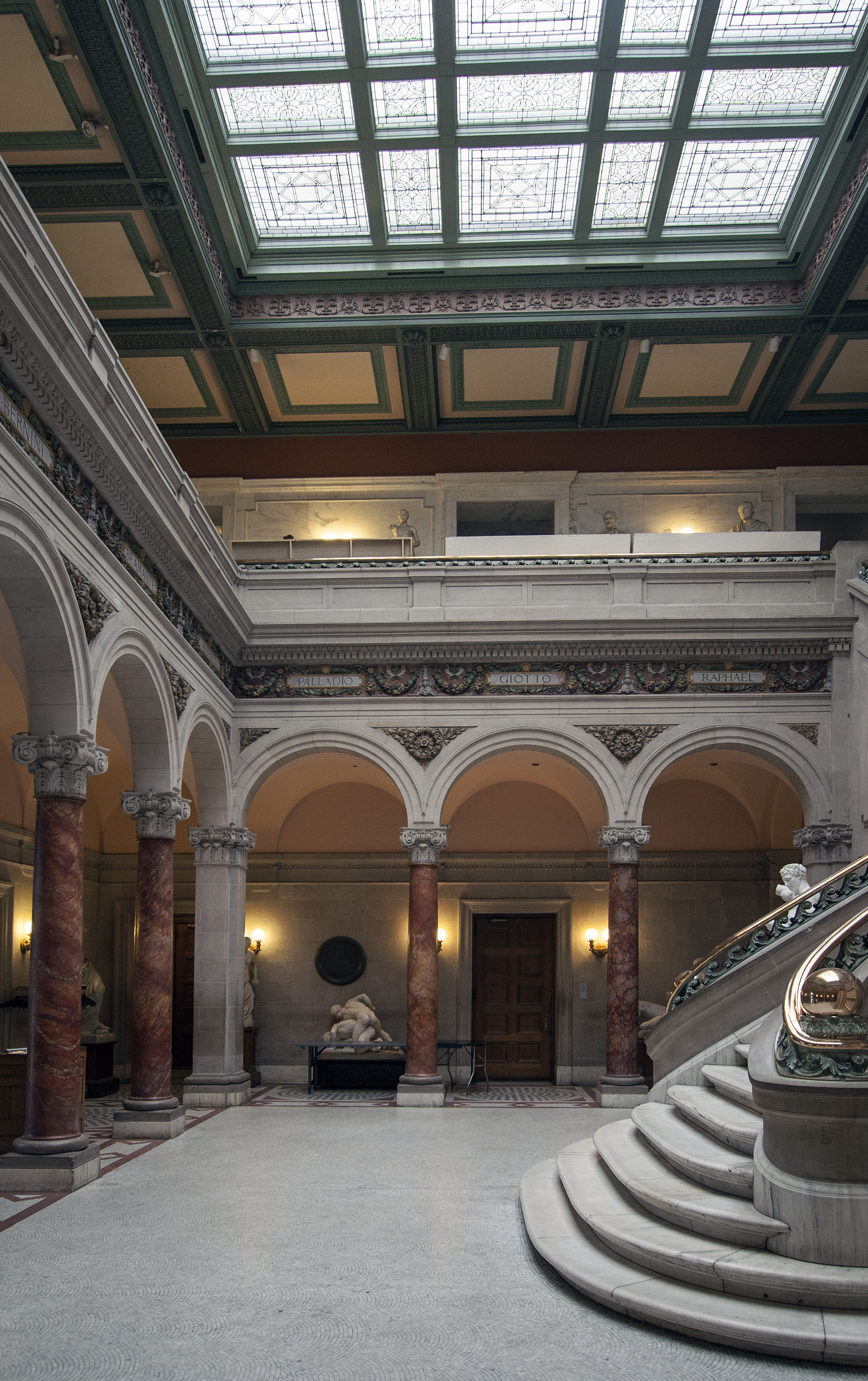
Main hall

=== Main building ===
Main Building

The Main Building houses painting and drawing studios, undergraduate photography department, foundation department, two departmental galleries, undergraduate admissions and the President's Office.

Construction began on a new campus in Bolton Hill when its Centre Market building was destroyed. Construction was completed in 1908. The State of Maryland, the Carnegie Foundation, and local benefactors contributed funds to build it. Michael Jenkins donated the land, stipulating that the new building not clash with the nearby Gothic Revival Corpus Christi Church. The Main Building was the first to be designed by New York-based architects Pell & Corbett, who were awarded the contract when they won a $500 design contest sponsored by the New York Association of Independent Architects. Otto Fuchs designed the interior studio plans. The architecture was intended to evoke a feeling of the Grand Canal of Venice, c. 1400. The exterior marble is carved from "Beaver Dam" marble, excavated from the Baltimore County quarry near Cockeysville, Maryland. It is the same marble used to build the Washington Monument in Baltimore designed by Robert Mills, and part of the Washington Monument in Washington, D.C.

- Mount Royal Station
- U.S. National Register of Historic Places
- U.S. National Historic Landmark
- The former B&O station, now the Maryland Institute College of Art, in 2009
- Location: 1400 Cathedral Street, Baltimore, Maryland
- Coordinates: 39°18′20″N 76°37′14″W
- Built: 1896
- Architects: Baldwin, E. Francis; Pennington, Josias
- Architectural style: Renaissance
- NRHP reference No.: 73002191

Significant dates
- Added to NRHP: June 18, 1973
- Designated NHL: December 8, 1976

Architectural features include the main entrance, offering a large marble staircase, stained-glass skylight and the names of Renaissance masters surrounding the entrance to the second floor. The exterior of the northeast façade features four stone memorial medallions: one for the city, one for the state and two others honoring institute benefactors Andrew Carnegie and Michael Jenkins. Throughout the Main Building plaster replicas of Greek and Roman statues offer students study targets for their Foundation year.

In 1908, the New York Association of Independent Architects awarded the building a gold key, the highest award in architecture at the time.

From 1990 to 1992, the building underwent a $5.1 million renovation under the direction of the Grieves, Worrell, Wright & O'Hatnick, Inc (GWWO) architectural firm. The renovation upgraded the building's facilities and created additional academic and office space while retaining much of the original design and décor.

=== Mount Royal Station ===
The Mount Royal Station houses the undergraduate departments of fiber and interdisciplinary sculpture, 3D classrooms, and the Rinehart School of Sculpture, as well as senior studios. The railroad tracks underneath the train shed remain active as CSX Transportation's freight mainline to New York City.

Built in 1896, the Mount Royal Station (now known as The Station Building) was the Baltimore and Ohio Railroad's showcase passenger station until it ceased operations in 1961. MICA purchased the building in 1964 and renovated it in 1966 under the direction of architect Richard Donkervoet, retaining as much of the building's exterior and interior as possible, including vaulted ceilings, columns and mosaic floor. Margaret Mead, in a lecture given at the Station, commented that the renovation "is perhaps the most magnificent example in the Western World of something being made into something else".

On December 8, 1976, the Station was added to the register of National Historic Landmarks, granting it full protection as an historic site. The Mount Royal Station's gable-roofed train shed, one of the country's last remaining such structures, was renovated in 1985. Between 2005 and 2007, MICA accomplished a two-phased, $6.3 million renovation by the architectural firm Grieves, Worrall, Wright & O'Hatnick, Inc. (GWWO).

=== Dolphin Building ===
The Dolphin Building at 100 Dolphin Street formerly housed MICA's Printmaking department and Book Arts and Printmaking concentrations, as well as the independent Dolphin Press. It had 15,000 square feet (1,400 m^{2}) of working space divided into three floors. In 2016, MICA demolished the Dolphin Building in preparation of a five story/25,000 square feet structure, designed by Baltimore architectural firm GWWO. The building reopened in September 2017, and is now home to the Interactive Arts, Game Design, Product Design, and Architectural Design departments.

=== Bunting Center ===
Bunting Center houses Liberal Arts departments (art history and language, literature, and culture), the campus Writing Center, academic advising and the registrar. Bunting Center also houses a restaurant, Java Corner. The first floor and basement level house the Decker Library, which includes a collection of over 600 art books in its Special Collections area. Students are allowed to view any Special Collections item by requesting it from library staff. The library also includes an oversized Folio section and a wide collection of video and film materials, including DVD and Blu-ray. It hosts display cases for monthly exhibits, a private Screening Room for viewing films and holding meetings, and a classroom for instruction. Bunting Center contains the Pinkard Gallery and Student Space Gallery.

The acquisition and renovation of Bunting Center increased MICA's academic space by 20% when it opened in 1998. It was named for trustee George Bunting, who was also instrumental in the development of the Fox Building, among other projects.

The Bunting Center received the Grand Design Award and Honor Award from AIA Baltimore in 1998. In 2007, architect Steve Ziger headed the building's $5.5 million renovation, seeking to create "a real sense of neighborhood" for the college.

=== Firehouse ===
The Firehouse hosts the college's operations and facilities management department. The building has 7,224 square feet (671.1 m^{2}) of space. MICA purchased a historic Firehouse along North Avenue in 2001 and renovated the building in 2003. As part of the redevelopment agreement, MICA maintained the station's front façade in accordance with Commission for Historical and Architectural Preservation standards. The renovation architect was Cho Benn Holback + Associates, Inc. Kajima Construction Services was the contractor. The Firehouse won an award from the Baltimore Heritage Foundation for preservation in 2004.

=== Fox Building ===
The Fox Building

The building houses Decker Gallery, Café Doris, Meyerhoff Gallery, the Center for Art Education, the Division of Continuing Studies, as well as Ceramics, Illustration, Environmental Design, GFA, Drawing and Painting departments, the woodshop, the nature library, and Graphic Design MA (formerly Graphic Design Post-Baccalaureate). The Fox Building offers more than 60,000 square feet (5,600 m^{2}) of usable space.

Built in 1915 as the Cannon Shoe Factory, the Fox Building was purchased in 1976. After two years of planning by architects Ayers/Saint/Gross, work began in 1979 and the newly renovated building opened in 1980. This renovation retained most of the warehouse character of the building, including exposed ductwork and framing and the original exterior—The renovations cost $2.5 million, and the building was named for architect Charles J. Fox, a 1965 graduate of MICA whose family contributed over $1.5 million of the renovation cost. After the conversion, the Mount Royal Improvement Association granted MICA an Award of Merit for its contribution to the community.

In 2005, a second renovation added another gallery and cafe.

=== Bank Building (Studio Center) ===
The 120,000-square-foot (11,000 m^{2}) building houses the post-baccalaureate certificate program, Hoffberger School of Painting, The Mount Royal School of Art, the Graduate Photographic and Electronic Media program, and Senior student studios. Although the official name is The Studio Center, many students know it as The Bank Building.

MICA purchased the former Jos. A. Bank sewing plant on North Avenue in August 2000. The all-brick building dates to the early 20th century and was home to Morgan Millwork for most of the century.

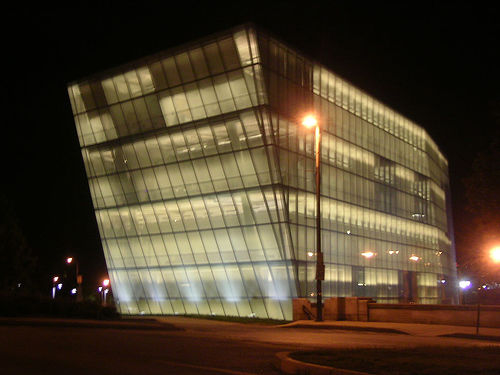
The Brown Center

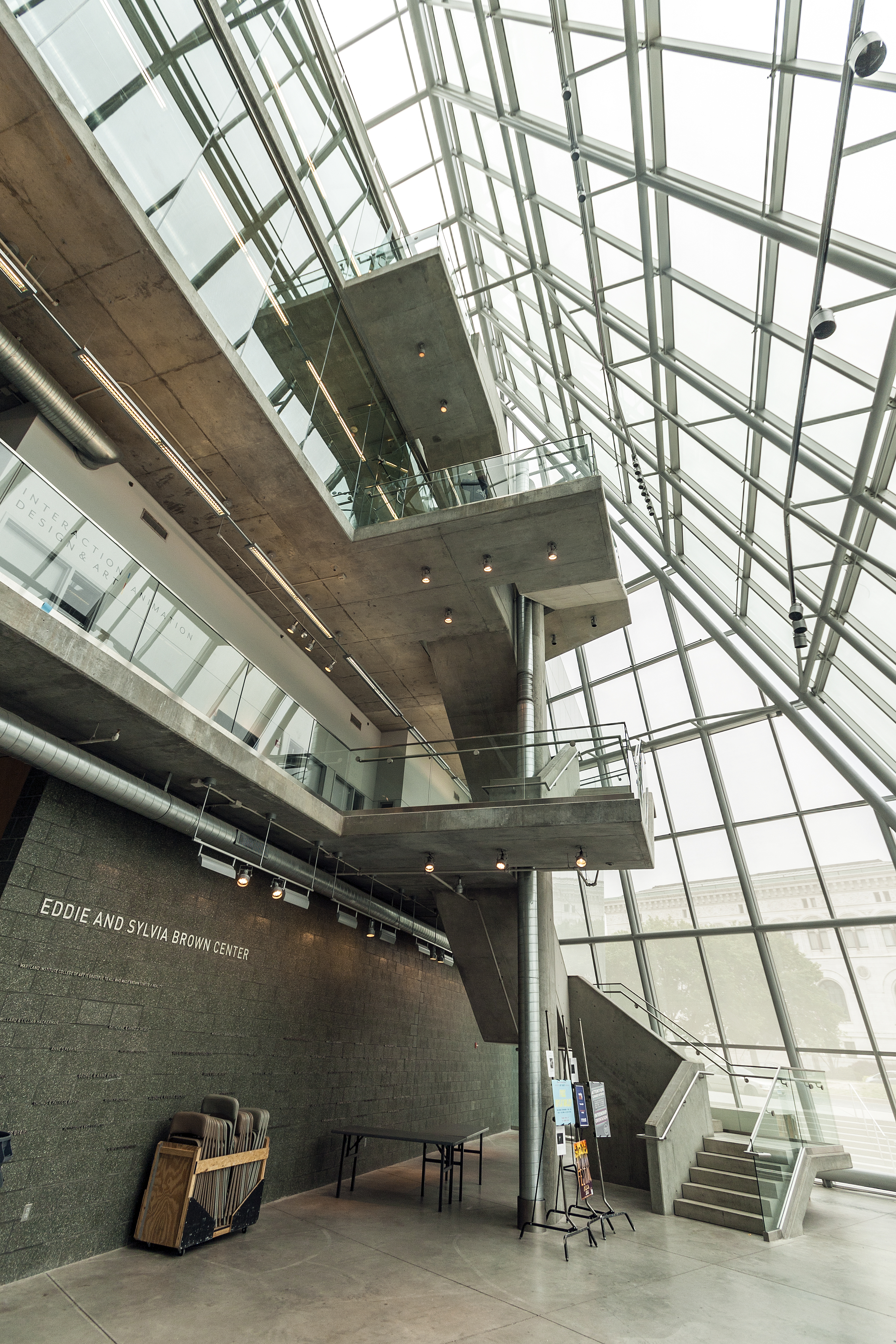
Brown Center interior

=== Brown Center ===
The Brown Center houses MICA's digital art and design programs, as well as the 525-seat Falvey Hall, which, in addition to hosting school-related functions, has also played host to events like the Maryland Film Festival and National Portfolio Day. It houses the Video, Animation, and BFA and MFA Graphic Design departments. It also has an art gallery, a secondary hall for lectures ("Brown 320"), and a "Black-Box" area for Interactive Media installations.

The first newly constructed academic building for the college in nearly a hundred years, Brown Center was dedicated on October 17, 2003, and became fully operational in January 2004. It was bolstered by a $6 million gift from Eddie and Sylvia Brown, the largest gift ever received by the institute. The building was designed by architect Charles Brickbauer and Ziger/Snead.

The 61,410-square-foot (5,705 m^{2}), five-story contemporary structure garnered acclaim as an architectural landmark. Awards have included the AIABaltimore 2004 Grand Design Award, AIA Maryland 2004 Honor Award of Excellence, regional award of merit in 2004 in the International Illumination Design Award competition, and several awards for excellence in construction. In addition, MICA president Fred Lazarus traveled to Italy in June 2006 to receive the Dedalo Minosse Prize for Brown Center. Brown Center was the only American project among the finalists.

=== Additional facilities ===
Additional buildings making up MICA's campus include the Maryland Institute College of Art shop (known simply as "The MICA Store") at 1501 W. Mount Royal Ave. selling art supplies and books, and official MICA merchandise.

== Student housing ==
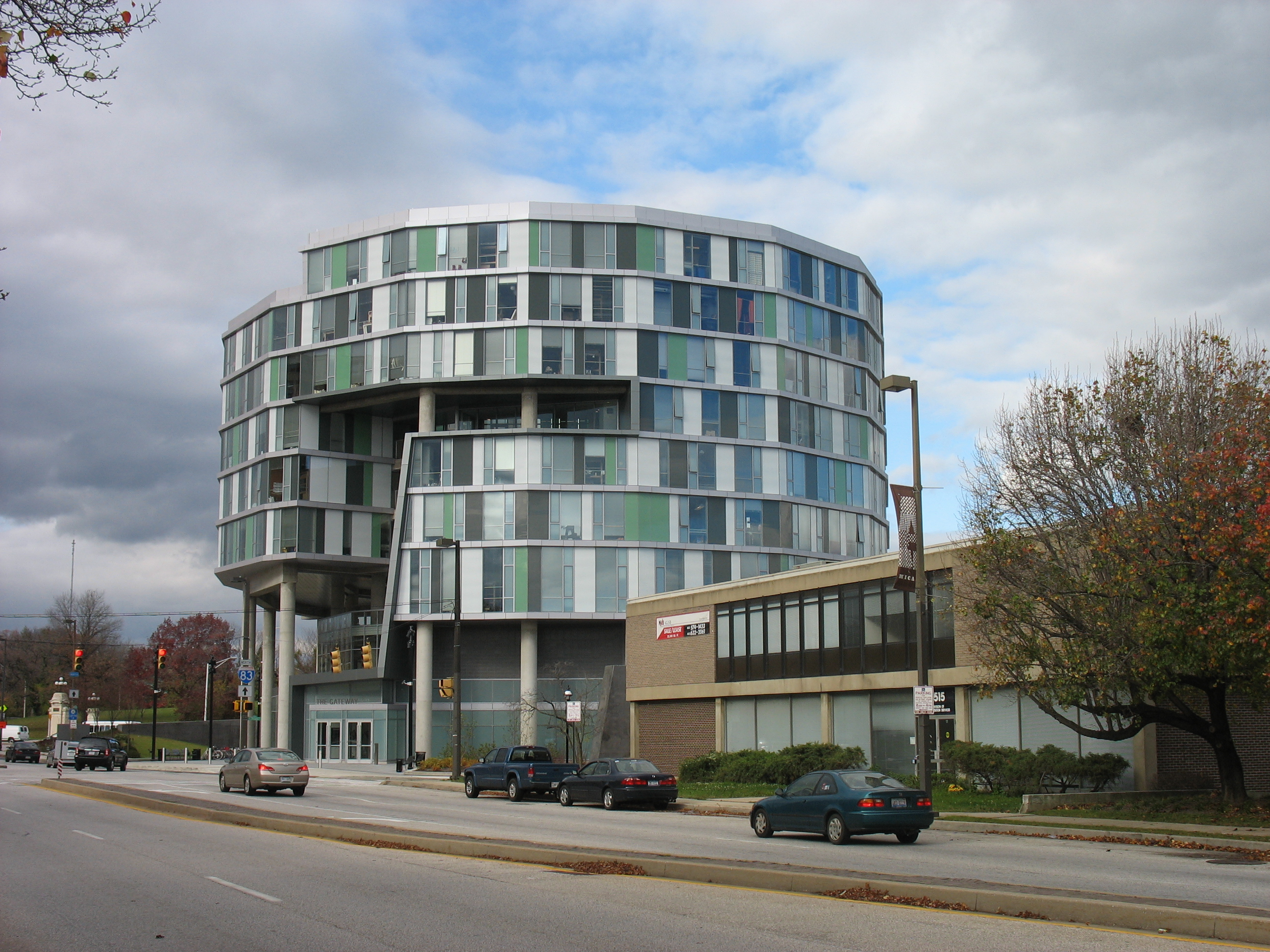
The Gateway

=== Founder's Green ===
Founder's Green is a three-building, four-story student apartment complex. Among the first student residences to be constructed on the apartment-living model, it houses approximately 500 students. When MICA proposed purchasing a lot on McMechen Street that had been vacant for more than 30 years, to build student housing, and the Bolton Hill neighborhood approved the purchase and donated $50,000. Built in 1991, and previously named "The Commons". In 2012, the building was renamed and renovated into the apartment-style by architecture firm, Ayers Saint Gross.

=== Meyerhoff House ===
Meyerhoff House is a residence for Sophomore, Junior and Senior students. The building includes the college's main dining facility, student life center and recreational amenities. Originally built as the Hospital for the Women of Maryland, the building was used as nursing home for some time until it closed in 1994. The building was vacant for seven years until MICA purchased it in January 2001.

=== The Gateway ===
The Gateway includes apartments to accommodate 217 student residents, a translucent studio tower, a multi-use performance space, the college's largest student exhibition gallery, and a new home for the Joseph Meyerhoff Center for Career Development. The Gateway is located at the intersection of Mount Royal and North avenues, alongside the Jones Falls Expressway (I-83). Construction began on The Gateway in October 2006 and completed in August 2008. It was designed by RTKL Associates Inc. In August 2008, the first students moved into the Gateway.

== Notable alumni ==
Notable former students of the Maryland Institute College of Art include the following individuals, listed by field of work:

=== Academia ===
- Earl Hofmann (B.F.A. 1953), painter, educator
- Mark Milloff (M.F.A.), multidisciplinary artist and educator at Rhode Island School of Design
- Andrew Cornell Robinson (B.F.A.1991), professor at Parsons The New School for Design, painter, printmaker, and sculptor
- Dorothy Cavalier Yanik (Painting M.F.A. 1975) professor at Carnegie Mellon University and various other schools

=== Actors ===
- Tamara Dobson (Fashion Illustration B.F.A. 1970), actress in Cleopatra Jones and fashion model.
- Abbi Jacobson (General Fine Arts B.F.A. 2006), comedian, writer, actress, and illustrator known for her work on the TV series Broad City
- Colby Keller (M.F.A. 2007), pornographic film actor, visual artist, and blogger
- Susan Lowe (B.F.A.) actress and one of the Dreamlanders
- Maelcum Soul, (Painting B.F.A.) actress and painter

=== Architects ===
- Richard Armiger (1970), architectural model maker
- Wright Butler (1891), architect
- F. Pierpont Davis, architect and 1932 Olympics 8 Metre gold medalist
- John Jacob Zink (B.F.A. 1904), architect of movie houses

=== Business ===
- Heather Day (B.F.A. 2012), abstract painter and entrepreneur of the culinary-art startup, Studio Table
- Deana Haggag (Curatorial Practice M.F.A. 2013), President and CEO of the national arts funding organization United States Artists
- Dana Veraldi (Photography B.F.A. 2007), designer, artist, and entrepreneur known for her t-shirt line

=== Designers ===
- Cheryl D. Miller (B.F.A. 1974), AIGA Medalist 2021
- Zach Richter (B.F.A. 2007), creative director of digital and VR experiences, designer

=== Film ===
- John Carter (B.F.A. 1992), film director and conceptual artist

=== Musicians ===
- David Byrne (never graduated, attended 1971–1972), singer, member of Talking Heads band
- Frances Quinlan (Painting B.F.A. 2008) in the indie band, Hop Along

=== Fine Arts ===
==== Illustrators ====
- Jeremy Caniglia (M.F.A. 1995), illustrator of book cover art for fantasy and horror genres
- Jennifer Daniel (illustrator) (B.F.A. 2000), emoji subcommittee chair
- ND Stevenson (B.F.A. 2013), illustrator and cartoonist
- Babs Tarr (B.F.A. 2010), illustrator
- Annie Wu (B.F.A. 2010), illustrator and comic book artist

==== Multimedia, mixed media and installation ====
- Jim Condron, (M.F.A. 2004), painter and mixed media artist
- Michael Corris (M.F.A. 1972), conceptual artist and writer on art.
- Jane Frank (B.F.A. 1935), painter, sculptor, mixed media artist, and textile artist
- Gaia (B.F.A. 2011), street muralist and artist.
- Jae Ko (M.F.A. 1998), installation, sculpture, vinyl cord drawings, and drawings on paper
- Jeff Koons (B.F.A. 1976), sculptor and painter
- Jenni Lukac, contemporary artist
- Jimmy Joe Roche (M.F.A. 2008), visual artist and underground filmmaker
- Drew Shiflett (M.F.A. 1978), mixed media artist and sculptor
- Shinique Smith (General Fine Art B.F.A.1992, Mount Royal School Of Art M.F.A. 2003), painter, sculptor, and installation artist
- Jen Stark (2005), paper sculptor, drawer, and animator
- St. Clair Wright (1932), preservationist and gardener

==== Painters ====
- Dhruvi Acharya (Painting M.F.A., 1998)
- Kamrooz Aram (B.F.A. 2001), painter.
- Florence Hochschild Austrian, painter
- Donald Baechler (B.F.A. 1977), painter
- Angie Elizabeth Brooksby (1988), painter
- Larry Poncho Brown (1984), painter and sculptor
- Jeremy Caniglia (1995), figurative painter
- Xinyi Cheng (MFA 2014), painter
- Lesley Dill (1980), contemporary artist
- William Downs, (2003), painter
- John Ennis (1976), painter
- Brock Enright (1998), painter
- Joan Erbe (1950), painter, sculptor
- Amir H. Fallah (born 1979, Painting B.F.A. 2002), painter and magazine publisher
- Joshua Field (1996), painter
- Lee Gatch, painter
- Gladys Goldstein, painter
- Elaine Hamilton (1945), painter and muralist
- Earl Hofmann (1953), painter and educator
- Kika Karadi (1997), painter
- Morris Louis (1933), painter
- Ted Mineo (Painting B.F.A. 2002), painter
- Karin Olah (1999), contemporary painter, collage, and fiber artist
- Selma L. Oppenheimer, painter
- Amalie Rothschild (1934) painter and sculptor
- Shelby Shackelford (1921), painter, printmaker, illustrator
- Amy Sherald (M.F.A. 2004), painter
- Lee Woodward Zeigler (1885), muralist and illustrator

==== Photographers ====
- Elle Pérez (1989), photographer
- Joan Cassis (1974), photographer
- Linda Day Clark (B.F.A. 1994), photographer
- Lola Flash (1981), photographer
- Marilyn Nance (1996), photographer

==== Sculptors ====
- Nina Akamu (B.F.A. 1977), sculptor
- Matt Johnson (2000), sculptor
- Ernest Keyser, sculptor
- Gwen Lux (attended 1926–1927), sculptor and Guggenheim fellow in 1933 for Fine Arts
- James Earl Reid (1942–2021), sculptor
- William Henry Rinehart, sculptor
- Jacolby Satterwhite (2008,) video artist
- Hans Schuler (1899), sculptor
- Joyce J. Scott (1970), sculptor, beadworker

== Notable faculty ==
- Timothy App, painter
- Laurence Arcadias, animator
- Joe Cardarelli, poet
- Norman Carlberg
- Jim Condron, painter, mixed media artist
- Gladys Goldstein, painter
- Grace Hartigan
- Earl Hofmann, painter
- Yumi Hogan, painter, former First Lady of Maryland
- Nate Larson, photographer
- Ellen Lupton, graphic designer
- Raoul Middleman
- Salvatore Scarpitta, sculptor
- José Villarrubia, illustrator
- John Yau, poet
- Patrick O'Brien, illustrator
