= National Train Day =

Event about the topic of trains

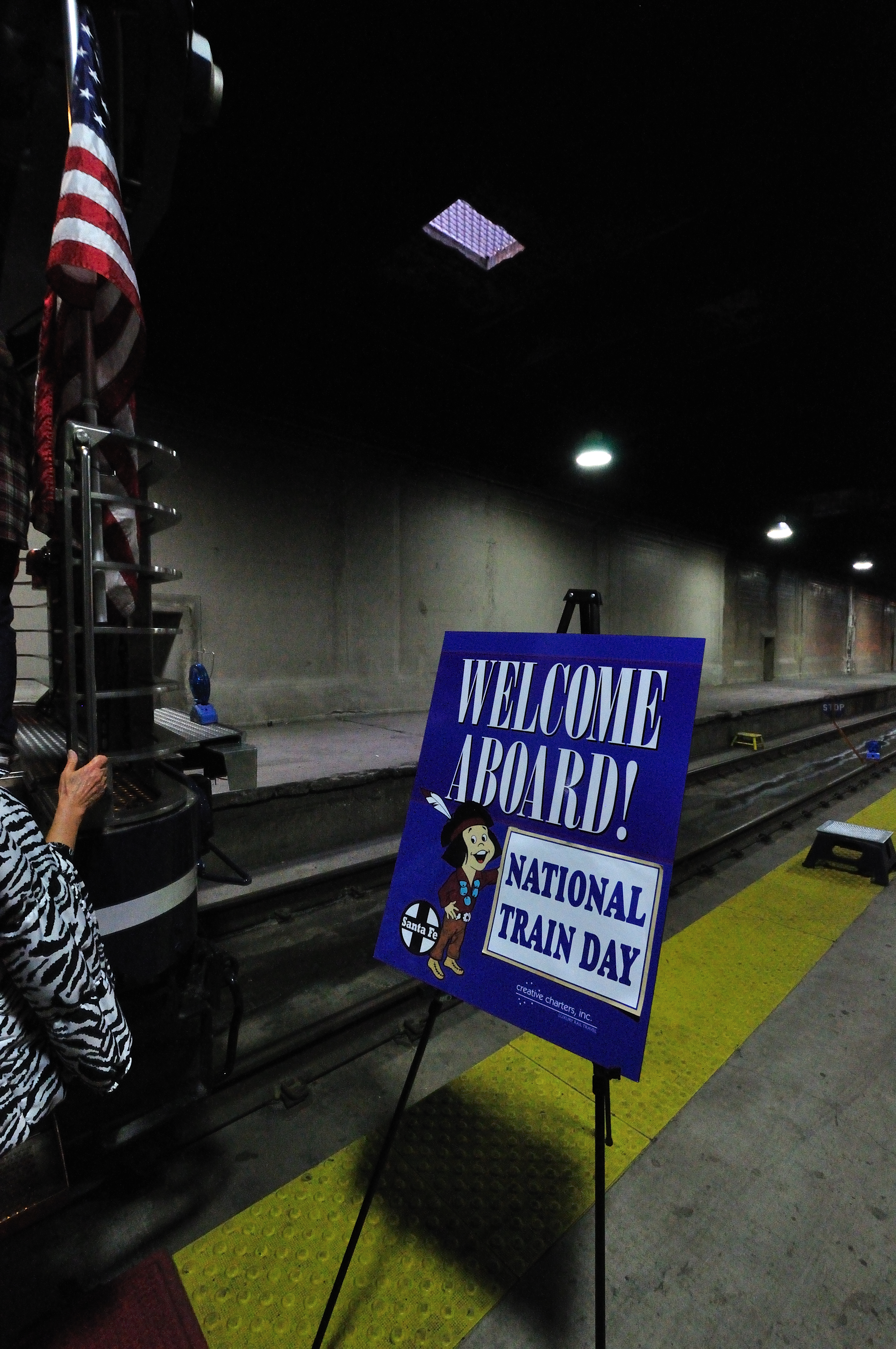
A welcome sign at Chicago Union Station highlighting a National Train Day event in 2010

National Train Day is a holiday started by Amtrak in 2008 as a method to spread information to the general public about the advantages of railway travel and the history of trains in the United States. It was held each year on the Saturday closest to May 10, the anniversary of the pounding of the Golden spike in Promontory, Utah, which marked the completion of the first transcontinental railroad in the U.S. Events were held at major Amtrak stations as well as railroad museums across the country and often have passenger cars and model railroad layouts on display. The largest events took place in Washington, D.C., Philadelphia, Chicago and Los Angeles. National Train Day was cancelled after 2015 due to budget cuts within Amtrak, although many rail organizations and railfans continue to observe the holiday.

== Events ==
The major events of National Train Day usually consist of equipment displays in the major stations across the Amtrak system. This includes Acela Express and Keystone Service sets in the Northeastern cities, and Superliner cars in Chicago, Los Angeles, San Antonio and Florida that are used on long-distance trains in those regions. In addition, many private cars are also put on display. Other large cities featured rail equipment and displays from freight railroads, transit agencies, non-profit rail organizations and historical societies as part of National Train Day. Some smaller events consisted of a model train layout from a local club or other train-related items on display.

Because of a scheduling conflict on the original National Train Day in 2008, Toledo Union Station hosted their NTD event a week before the rest of the country in 2008. This tradition of having the 'first' Train Day has continued every year since at the Martin Luther King, Jr. Plaza Amtrak and intermodal station.

Besides events at active Amtrak stations, railway history museums participate in National Train Day as well. This often includes tours of historic rail cars and excursion train rides.

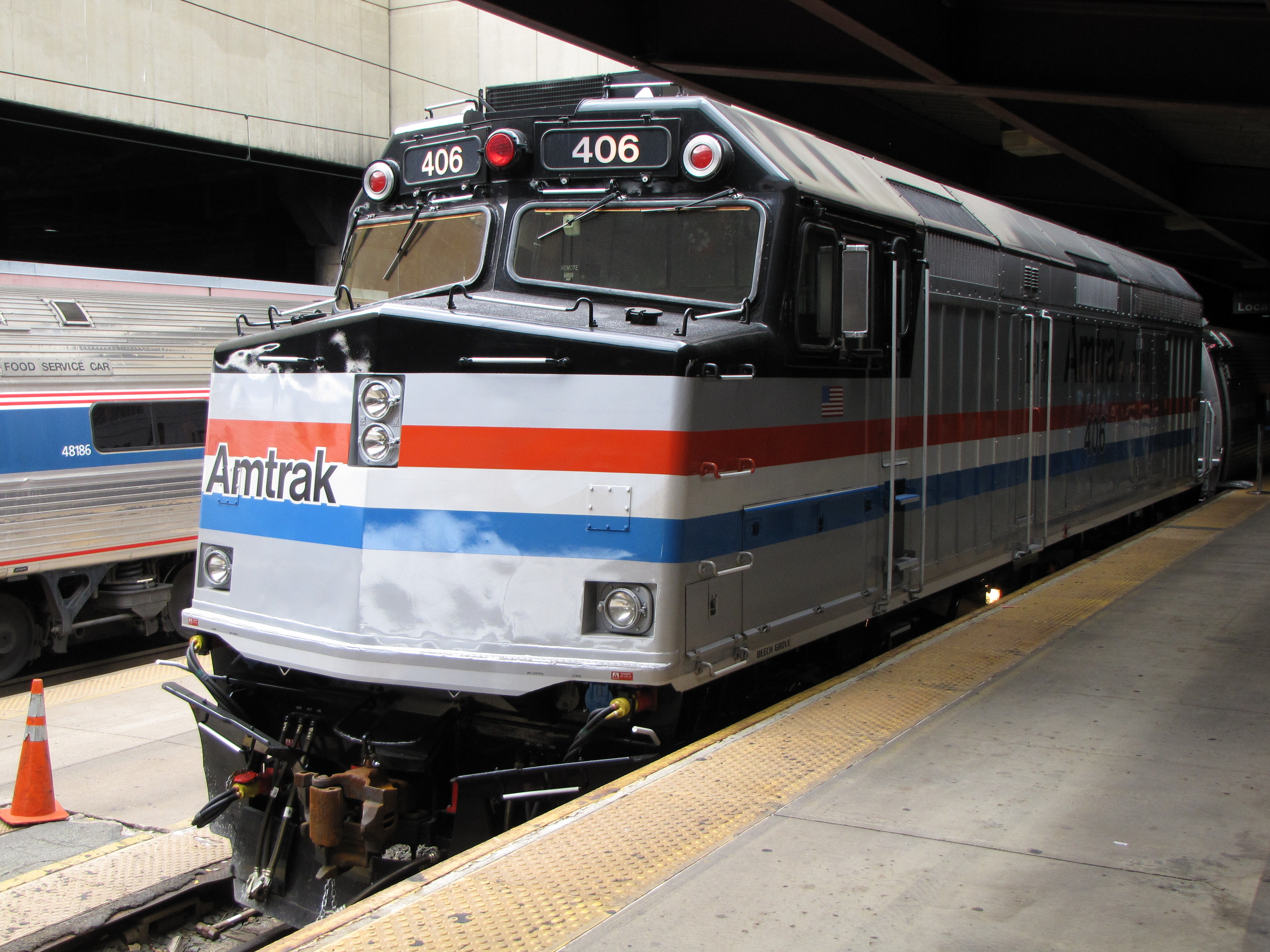
Amtrak 406 at Washington Union Station for National Train Day 2011 painted in heritage livery with markings commemorating the start of Amtrak service.

The 2011 event celebrated Amtrak's 40th Anniversary celebration, as the company first went into service on May 1, 1971.

The National Association of Railroad Passengers, the largest non-profit rail advocacy organization in America, announced that their members would be celebrating the first National Train Day in 2008. Many other non-profits participated regionally.

In 2013, Duluth, Minnesota, hosted one of the largest events, having steam locomotives Milwaukee Road 261 and Soo Line 2719 operating on the North Shore Scenic Railroad, as well as large museum displays and events.

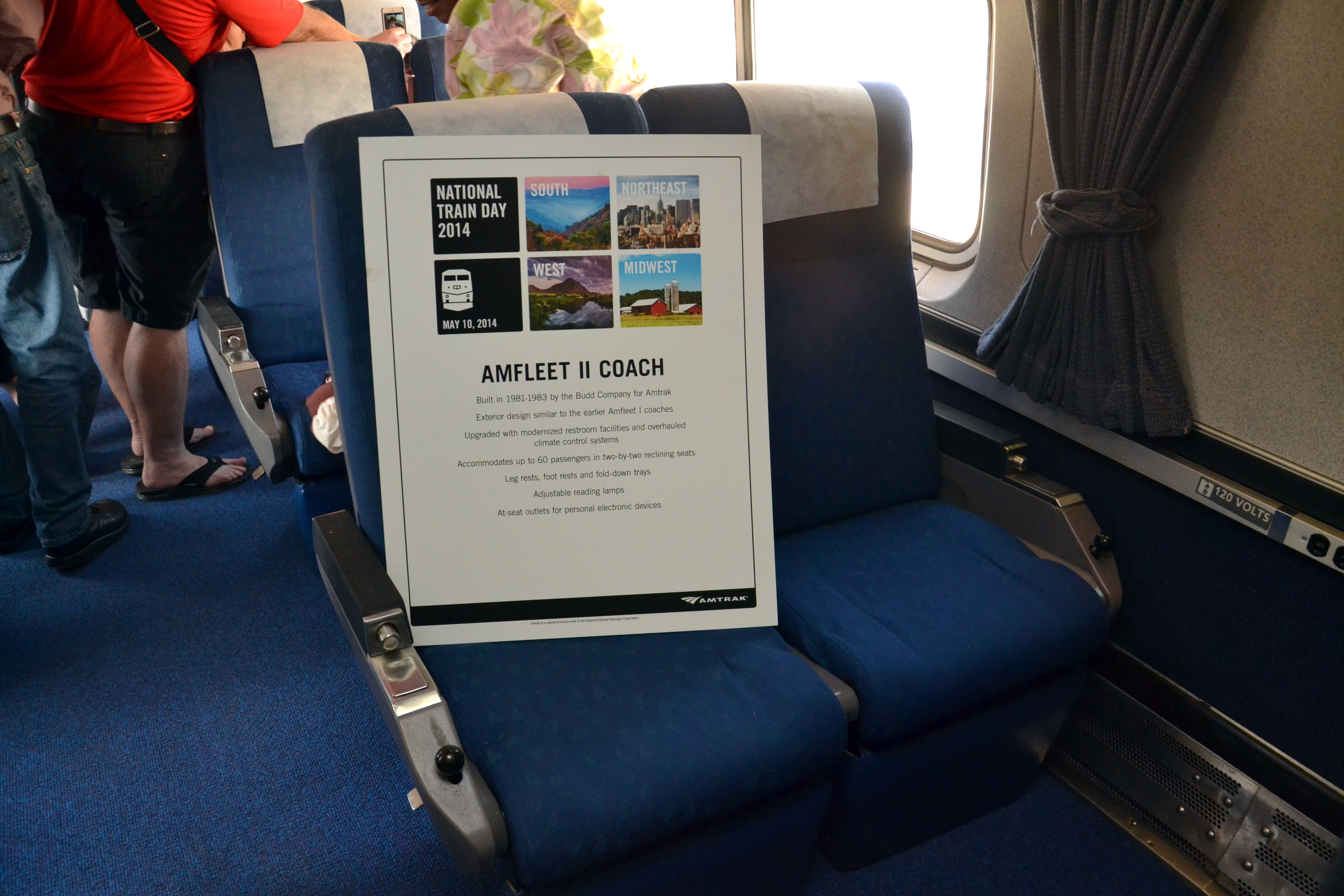
An interpretive sign aboard an Amfleet coach for National Train Day 2014

In 2015, it was announced that the community program called National Train Day would be replaced by a company sponsored event called Amtrak Train Days. The format changed from multiple events on a single day in many cities to individual events over the course of the spring, summer and fall.

== Celebrity spokespersons ==
Every National Train Day through 2012 featured an official celebrity spokesperson who appeared at a single event.

- 2008: Al Roker, television weatherman and actor
- 2009: Randy Jackson, American Idol judge
- 2010: Taye Diggs, actor
- 2011: Gladys Knight, "Midnight Train to Georgia" singer
- 2012: Rosario Dawson, Unstoppable movie actress

On National Train Day May 8, 2010 in New York Penn Station, the cast of Cake Boss presented a special cake to Amtrak for the event. Celebrity spokespersons were discontinued after 2012.
