= Angie Elizabeth Brooksby =

American painter

- Born: 1965 (age 60–61)
- Education: Frederick High School; Maryland Institute College of Art

Angie Elizabeth Brooksby (born 1965) is a contemporary American-born painter. She paints cityscapes of Paris, specifically the paintings of the Parisian blue hour. Before living in Paris she lived and painted for over 20 years in Florence, Italy. She was born in Poughkeepsie, New York.

== Work ==
She studied photography in Maryland at Frederick High School (FHS) with Dr. Margaret Dowell co-author of Addiction and Art (Johns Hopkins Press), while at FHS she received awards from the state of Maryland for excellent photography and she was selected to attend the summer program at the prestigious CTY in 1982. In 1987 she earned a Bachelor of Fine Arts with honors in sculpture from the Maryland Institute College of Art (MICA). While at MICA she studied with sculptor John Shahn, the son of social realist painter Ben Shahn, and with poet Joe Cardelli. In 1986 she attended Studio Art Centers International in Florence, Italy where she studied painting with Fulbright Scholar Gene Baldini.

== Awards ==
- Fanny B Thalheimer prize from Maryland Institute College of Art.
- 1983 – first prize for continuing arts education from the Frederick County Arts Association
- 1983-1984 – Senatorial scholarship from the state of Maryland
- 1984 – merit scholarship from the Loats Foundation and the Ephraim Kaiser prize
- 1999 – awarded the first prize for painting in the Premio Firenze whereupon her painting was published on the cover of Eco d'Arte Moderna magazine

While in Italy she was invited to participate in the international exhibition of contemporary art, Premio Sulmona from 1999 through 2004, sponsored by the Italian Ministry of Affairs and the region of Abruzzo in 2001 the critic Vittorio Sgarbi presided the jury. Brooksby also participated upon invitation to the Premio Santhià in 1999, 2002 and 2005 sponsored by the region of Piedmont. She has appeared several times on Toscana TV for the program Incontro con l'Arte interviewed by Fabrizio Borghini, and in 1999 Brooksby was invited among 20 Florentine painters to exhibit at the Fortezza da Basso with the art critic Tomasso Paloscia. May 4, 2000 Brooksby was interviewed by Matt Lauer on The Today Show live from Florence, in 2002 she was part of the documentary on the Stendahl syndrome “Holi-days“ an interview for documentary by Tell-Tale Productions. In January 2010 Brooksby was interviewed for the Frederick News Post

She is the author of two articles about importing and exporting art and antiques to and from Italy.
