= Hyphen Press =

London publisher of books on design and typography

- Founded: 1980; 46 years ago
- Founder: Robin Kinross
- Country of origin: United Kingdom
- Headquarters location: London
- Distribution: Publishers Group UK (UK books); Books at Manic (Australia books); Princeton Architectural Press (US books); New Arts International (music worldwide)
- Publication types: Books, CDs
- Nonfiction topics: design and typography
- Official website: hyphenpress.co.uk

Hyphen Press is a London publisher of books on design and typography. Hyphen Press was founded by Robin Kinross in 1980, but has published nearly all of its books beginning in the 1990s.

Hyphen Press has produced about thirty books on a diverse range of topics, but most of its most important publications are devoted to the topic of typography. These include Christopher Burke's Paul Renner, 1998; Robin Kinross's Anthony Froshaug: Typography & Texts, 2000; Harry Carter's A View of Early Typography, 2002; Designing Books, 2003, by Jost Hochuli and Robin Kinross; Peter Burnhill's Type Spaces, 2003; Gerrit Noordzij's The Stroke: Theory of Writing, 2005; and Robin Kinross's Modern Typography, 2010.

Princeton Architectural Press is the North American distributor of Hyphen Press books.

Hyphen Press has also produced several music CDs since 2004.
