= Association of Illustrators =

- Abbreviation: AOI
- Founded: 1973; 53 years ago
- Headquarters: London, WC2
- Location: United Kingdom
- Members: 1,800
- Website: www.theaoi.com

The Association of Illustrators (AOI) is a British trade association for illustration, to advance and protect illustrators' rights. It was established in the United Kingdom in 1973. Its founders included Rufus Segar. Male (2014) opined that it "is now the leading organisation in the UK for the advancement and protection of illustrators' rights."

== Overview ==
The AOI promotes and encourages commercial and ethical standards within the industry, to improve the standing of illustration as a profession. It actively campaigns to maintain and protect the rights of its members, through the Pro-Action Campaign and Liaison Group, the British Copyright Council, the Creators' Rights Alliance and the European Illustrators Forum.

With over 1,800 members, including freelance illustrators, agents, students, colleges and commissioners, the AOI provides support, advice and education to members of the industry worldwide, at every stage of their career.

Notable illustrators among its patrons include Ralph Steadman, Sir Quentin Blake, Shirley Hughes and Raymond Briggs. Blake opined: "The AOI is more relevant than ever to the advancement of students, illustrators and illustration."

== History ==
- 1976 - Launch of AOI's annual exhibition of British illustration, and its linked publication Images
- 1989 - Publication of Rights by AOI, to help illustrators with legal issues such as contracts and copyright
- 2002 - Launch of the AOI as a general resource for both commissioners and illustrators.
