= Anarchist Federation =

Anarchist Federation is the name of several organisations:

- Anarchist Federation (Britain)
- Anarchist Federation of Britain
- Anarchist Federation (France)
- Anarchist Federation of Gran Canaria
- Anarchist Federation (Poland)
- Italian Anarchist Federation
- Iberian Anarchist Federation
- Japanese Anarchist Federation
- Anarchist Federation (Czech republic and Slovakia)
- Mexican Anarchist Federation
- Anarchist Federation (Sweden)
- New York Federation of Anarchists (United States)
- Social Revolutionary Anarchist Federation (United States)
- Uruguayan Anarchist Federation
