= The Strickland Press =

- Formation: 1939
- Founder: Guy Aldred
- Founded at: Glasgow
- Dissolved: 1968
- Type: Publishing company
- Key people: Guy Aldred, Ethel MacDonald, Jenny Patrick, John Taylor Caldwell

The Strickland Press was an anarchist publishing house in George Street, Glasgow which was established in 1939 by prominent member of the Anti-Parliamentary Communist Federation (APCF) Guy Aldred.

== Bequest and foundation ==
In 1938 Guy Aldred's friend, socialist and liberalist Sir Walter Strickland, died leaving Aldred a fortune "for socialist and atheist propaganda". Aldred began work straight away buying premises and machinery and proceeded to reprint all his old pamphlets, before he had actually secured the money. Strickland's family then contested the will citing the fact that socialist and atheist propaganda was illegal under Czech law (Strickland had become a naturalised Czech subject after the creation of the state of Czechoslovakia). After a protracted legal battle, Aldred was left out of pocket only to be saved, financially, by the Marquis of Tavistock. Through Tavistock's support, Aldred was able to begin work on his monthly The Word - periodical of the United Socialist Movement which was one of the key publications produced by the Strickland Press.

== Publications ==
The Press produced periodicals and left-wing and pacifist pamphlets, many written by Aldred.

== Dissolution ==
The Marquis of Tavistock - who became the Duke of Bedford - committed suicide after the Second World War, making no provision for Aldred in his will. Nevertheless, Aldred continued to publish The Word until his death in 1963 supported by Ethel MacDonald and Jenny Patrick. MacDonald acted as manager and bookkeeper of the company until her death in 1960, setting type and printing alongside Patrick who continued working at Strickland Press until its dissolution. The George Street premises had to be vacated in 1962, when they were demolished to make way for expansion of the Royal College of Science and Technology, which later became the University of Strathclyde who now hold Aldred's archive. The Strickland Press was continued by John Taylor Caldwell until its closure in 1968.
