= God and the State =

Unfinished manuscript by Mikhail Bakunin

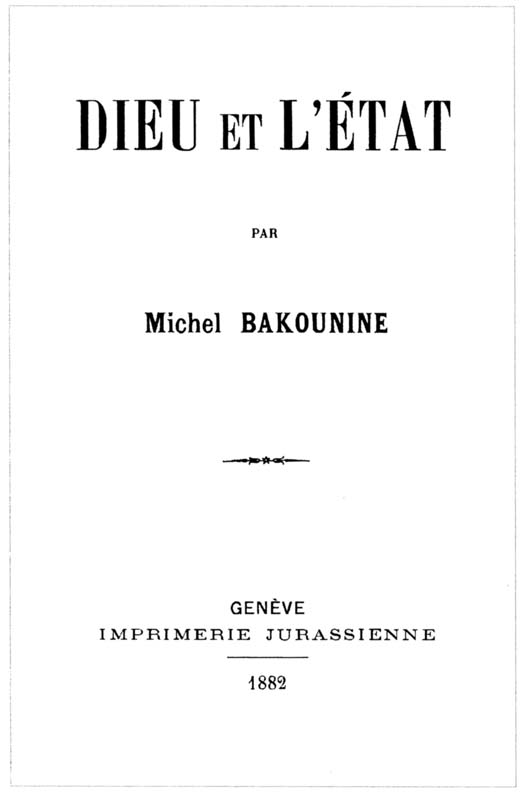
- The cover of the first print in 1882.
- Editors: Carlo Cafiero and Élisée Reclus
- Author: Mikhail Bakunin
- Original title: Dieu et l'état
- Language: English, translated from French
- Genre: Politics
- Publisher: Dover
- Publication date: 1882
- Publication place: France
- English publication date: 1883
- Media type: Print (Paperback)
- Pages: 89 p. (Dover Paperback Edition)
- ISBN: 978-0-486-22483-1 (Dover Paperback Edition)
- OCLC: 192839
- Dewey Decimal: 335/.83 19
- LC Class: HX833 .B313 1970
- Preceded by: Founding of the First International
- Followed by: The Immorality of the State

God and the State is an unfinished manuscript by the Russian anarchist philosopher Mikhail Bakunin, published posthumously in 1882. The work criticises Christianity and the then-burgeoning technocracy movement from a materialist, anarchist and individualist perspective.

== Background ==
With the outbreak of the Franco-Prussian War in July 1870, the Russian anarchist Mikhail Bakunin hoped the conflict would create the conditions for a social revolution, in which the French working-class would repel the invading Prussians, overthrow the Second French Empire and replace it with a "free federation of communes". By September 1870, the French Empire had collapsed, prompting Bakunin to move to Lyon to lead the coming revolution, which would culminate in the formation of a number of insurrectionary communes in France. Bakunin himself proclaimed the creation of the Lyon Commune, in which all institutions of the state were abolished and replaced by revolutionary committees, while taxes and debt collections would be suspended. The uprising in Lyon was quickly suppressed by the nascent French Third Republic, forcing Bakunin to flee to Switzerland. His experiences in France inspired him to write a book, The Knouto-Germanic Empire and the Social Revolution, in which he developed his ideas on anarchist philosophy. He intended it to be his final testament. The book would ultimately remain unfinished. Six years after Bakunin's death, an extract from the second part of the book was republished as a pamphlet titled God and the State.

== Contents ==
God and the State starts with a discussion on economic determinism, drawing from Karl Marx's own views on dialectical materialism. Bakunin begins by asserting his metaphysical belief that materialism, rather than idealism, provides the correct view of reality; paraphrasing Pierre-Joseph Proudhon, he says that ideas are "but a flower, whose root lies in the material conditions of existence". Bakunin then states that all aspects of human history, whether intellectual, political or social, are all mere reflections of the world's economic history. Bakunin distinguishes between idealistic faith, which presupposes facts without evidence, and materialistic experience, which involves the verification of facts through the scientific method.

The book subsequently diverges into an attack against organised religion. Expounding on antitheist ideas he had developed in previous unpublished essays, Bakunin elaborated his view that governmental and religious institutions had always collaborated to subjugate humanity and deny individuals their freedom. He held that, throughout civilisation, belief in the divine was used to uphold state institutions and class stratification. He saw "God and the State" as fundamentally interlinked and likewise equated all forms of government with exploitation. He therefore frames humanity and divinity in opposition to each other. Bakunin reasons that, if a God existed, then it would necessitate that all humanity be slaves; but as humanity "can and must be free", he concludes that God does not exist. Inverting a phrase by Voltaire, he declared that "if God really existed, it would be necessary to eliminate him".

The book later shifts its scope to a generalised discussion about the relationship between authority and science, the role of both in the function of the state and society, and the connection of these larger social structures to individuals. On the latter, Bakunin centred the individual feelings and perspectives of unique living people, which he worried would be reduced to mere statistics by increasingly large, centralised and technocratic states. He thus criticised proposals for a "government by scientists", as advocated by Marxism and positivism.

The book ultimately ends without a solid conclusion.

== Publication history ==
God and the State was first published in 1882, six years after Bakunin's death. Its title, originally known in French as Dieu et l'État, was given to it by Bakunin's comrades Carlo Cafiero and Élisée Reclus, who discovered his manuscript for it and edited it for publication. The anarchist historian Max Nettlau later found a continuation of Bakunin's original essay among his manuscripts and published an extract of it in the English magazine Liberty. Nettlau then published it in full, in the first volume of Bakunin's collected works (1895), which were originally printed in French.

God and the State has since become one of Bakunin's most famous and popular works, receiving several new editions and translations into multiple different languages. It was the only piece of Bakunin's writings that received an English translation in the decades after his death. In 1916, the American individualist Benjamin Tucker translated the work into English and published it through Mother Earth. In 1920, the British anarchist Guy Aldred published an abridged English-language edition. In 1970, a new edition edited by American historian Paul Avrich was published by Dover Publications.

== Reception ==
Guy Aldred described God and the State as Bakunin's "immortal work". Arthur Mendel called the book a "passionate critique" of idealism and religion, and an "eloquent and glowing defense" of reason. Sam Dolgoff praised Bakunin for his "cogent" elaboration of the connections between authority and science, noting that it was published at a time when Darwinists still regarded science as "something of a new religion". He considered the original title God and the State to be inappropriate, and says it would have been better summarised by the title Authority and Science.

== See also ==
- Anarchism and religion
- Anarchism in Russia
- Criticism of Christianity
- Criticism of Marxism
- List of books about anarchism

== Bibliography ==
- Aldred, Guy (1940). Bakunin. Glasgow: The Strickland Press. OCLC 915244740.
- Dolgoff, Sam, ed. (1972). Bakunin on Anarchy. Vintage Books. ISBN 039471783X. OCLC 5928655.
- Job, Sebastian (2016). "Bakunin and the Entheogenic Challenge to Atheism". Anarchist Studies. 24 (2): 83–105. ISSN 0967-3393.
- Kelly, Aileen (1982). Mikhail Bakunin: A Study in the Psychology and Politics of Utopianism. Oxford: Oxford University Press. ISBN 0198272448. LCCN 82-6287.
- Marshall, Peter H. (2008) [1992]. "Michael Bakunin: The Fanatic of Freedom". Demanding the Impossible: A History of Anarchism. London: Harper Perennial. pp. 263–308. ISBN 978-0-00-686245-1. OCLC 218212571.
- Masters, Anthony (1974). Bakunin: the Father of Anarchism. London: Sidgwick & Jackson. ISBN 0283979569. OCLC 907511050.
- McLaughlin, Paul (2002). Mikhail Bakunin: The Philosophical Basis of his Anarchism. New York: Algora Publishing. ISBN 1892941848. LCCN 2002-001934. OCLC 612054885.
- Mendel, Arthur (1981). Michael Bakunin: Roots of Apocalypse. New York: Praeger. ISBN 0030592186. LCCN 81-5168.
- Morris, Brian (1993). Mikhail Bakunin: The Philosophy of Freedom. New York: Black Rose Books. ISBN 1895431662. OCLC 678812569.
- Rocker, Rudolf (1964) [1953]. "Introduction". In Maximoff, Gregori (ed.). The Political Philosophy of Bakunin. New York: Free Press. pp. 17–28. OCLC 463186694.
