= British Anarchist Federation =

British Anarchist Federation may refer to:

- Anarchist Federation of Britain, an anti-war organisation established during World War II
- Anarchist Federation (Britain), an anarchist organisation established in 1984
