= Frank Leech =

Scottish anarchist (1900–1953)

- Born: 1900
- Died: 2 January 1953; Near Glasgow, Scotland
- Occupations: Newspaper editor, bookseller
- Organization: Glasgow Anarchist-Communist Federation
- Known for: Editing Fighting Call; Bakunin Press Bookshop
- Movement: Anarchism

Frank Leech (1900 – 2 January 1953) was a prominent anarchist in Glasgow, Scotland.

He ran several newspapers, among them Fighting Call, later incorporating another paper, Freedom.

He also ran a radical bookshop, Bakunin Press Bookshop, on Buchanan Street, Glasgow, named after anarchist Mikhail Bakunin. The shop was associated with the Anti-Parliamentary Communist Federation.

== Political activity ==
Leech was turned onto politics primarily through his experiences of the war. His conduit for radicalism was Alex Howie.

At the outbreak of the Spanish Civil War, there were attempts to co-ordinate the activities of London Freedom Group, the APCF and the United Socialist Movement which ushered in the creation of Fighting Call, edited by Leech. But a number of disagreements with its secretary Guy Aldred and one of its leading members, Jenny Patrick led to a feud and Leech's departure to the Glasgow Anarchist Communist Federation, later becoming Anarchist Federation of Britain. During this time he worked closely with Vernon Richards' publication - Spain and the World.

In 1937 he gave shelter to a number of anarchists of the Schwarzrotgruppe (a group advocating the assassination of Adolf Hitler), fleeing Nazi Germany after a foiled plot to end the Führer's life. It was Leech's initiative which formed the Glasgow Anarchist-Communist Federation in the same year.

== War resistance ==
During the Second World War Frank Leech was one of many Glasgow Anarchists who made attempts to resist various aspects of the war such as conscription.

Participation in Air Raid Precautions and compulsory fire-watching schemes was deprecated by Glasgow Anarchists. As Anarchist Federation member Eddie Fenwick explained when prosecuted for refusing to fire watch at his workplace, since the "owners of private property had denied him the elementary rights of man, he was entitled to refuse to protect private property."

When Leech was fined for refusing to comply with the fire watching regulations, and then imprisoned after declining to pay, he went on hunger strike in Barlinnie Prison, Glasgow, explaining afterwards that he would not "be used by any ruling class in their wars ... I am determined that our dictators will only conscript my dead body. Not whilst there is breath in it will I submit to them." After going without food for 17 days Leech was released when friends paid his fine.

In August 1940 four members of the Glasgow Anarchist Federation - James Kennedy, Frank Dorans, Eddie Shaw and Frank Leech - were prosecuted for allegedly inciting people to evade liabilities relating to conscription laid down in the National Service (Armed Forces) Act 1939. The basis of the charge was that they had advertised the offer of information and advice for prospective conscientious objectors, and had held mock tribunals to help COs prepare their cases. The four defendants were found not guilty, however, since in the judge's opinion their actions had not amounted to incitement.

One of the foremost methods of war resistance advocated by Leech and the APFC was that similar to modern conscientious objector status. Since, however, as a rule, the anti-parliamentarians did not conceal their willingness to fight in the class war, in many cases they failed to satisfy the Tribunals' frequent requirement that applicants should demonstrate conscientious objection to all warfare. Once the process of Tribunal and Appellate Tribunal had been exhausted, unsuccessful COs were required to undergo medical examination before being enlisted. Refusal to submit to examination was a criminal offence. In April 1944 Frank Leech reported that "Dozens of our members have served twelve months sentences for refusing M.E. [Medical Examination]."

Leech died at home near Glasgow on 2 January 1953.

== Quotations ==
- "Did our boys join up to be used against their fellow workers?", regarding the use of Scottish soldiers to counter a strike in Glasgow.
- "We would like to see you forming Committees to prepare for the taking over of the factory and commencing the production of the goods you require.", on a strike in 1943-1944, at Barr and Stroud's engineering factory in Glasgow, when 2000 women went on strike, 13 December 1943, in support of a pay demand. He was speaking for the Glasgow Anarchists.
- "We Glasgow Anarchists issued a leaflet calling workers to resist conscription by a General Strike . . . there was no response. Ever since, in common with other groups and individual workers, we have fallen back on individual resistance.", referring of attempts at resisting the Second World War.

== Bibliography ==
- The Truth about Barcelona
