= Ernst Schneider =

Ernst Schneider may refer to:

- Ernst Schneider (communist) (1883–1963), German sailor who played an active part in the German Revolution of November 1918 and who participated in the Hamburg Uprising of October 1923
- Ernst Schneider, Austrian engineer and inventor of the Voith Schneider Propeller
- Ernst-Schneider-Preis, a German journalism prize
- Hans Ernst Schneider (athlete), see Athletics at the 1952 Summer Olympics – Men's 400 metres
