= AFNORTH =

AFNORTH may refer to:

- Air Forces Northern, also known as the US Air Force's First Air Force
- Allied Forces Northern Europe, the most northern NATO headquarters from 1952 to 1993 located at Kolsås, Norway
- Regional Command Allied Forces North Europe (RC AFNORTH), a headquarters of the NATO command structure located at Brunssum, the Netherlands, from 2000 to 2004, when it was restructured to become the Joint Force Command Brunssum
- AFNORTH International School (AIS), an international school located just outside the NATO Joint Force Command in Brunssum, the Netherlands
- AF North, the Northern section of the Anarchist Federation (Britain and Ireland)
