= Solidarity Federation =

British anarcho-syndicalist organisation

- Abbreviation: SF or SolFed
- Established: 1950; 76 years ago (as SWF); 1979; 47 years ago (as DAM); 1994; 32 years ago (as SF)
- Type: Political organisation
- Headquarters: Manchester
- Location: United Kingdom
- Members: 250 (2016)
- Publication: Direct Action
- Affiliations: International Workers' Association
- Website: solfed.org.uk
- Formerly called: Syndicalist Workers Federation (until 1979); Direct Action Movement (until 1994)

The Solidarity Federation (SF; SolFed) is a British anarcho-syndicalist political organisation. It advocates for the abolition of capitalism and the state through industrial action, which it agitates for in industrial networks and local groups.

Originally established as the Syndicalist Workers Federation (SWF) in 1950, it became the British section of the International Workers' Association (IWA). In 1979, it reorganised into the Direct Action Movement (DAM), which participated in a number of industrial disputes during the 1980s and organised a short-lived couriers' union. Splits of anarchist communists from the organisation preceded its reorganisation into the Solidarity Federation, which it took the form of in 1994.

== History ==
=== Background ===
During the Spanish Civil War, many British anarchists moved towards anarcho-syndicalism and formed syndicalist organisations to support the Spanish National Confederation of Labour (CNT). After the defeat of the Spanish anarchists in the war, the British anarchist movement attempted to reorganise itself, culminating in the establishment of the Anarchist Federation of Britain (AFB), which included anarchists of various different tendencies.

=== Syndicalist Workers Federation ===
By the end of World War II, syndicalists had risen to the leadership of the AFB, causing a split in the organisation. In August 1950, the syndicalists that were left over in the AFB reorganised into the Syndicalist Workers Federation (SWF). The SWF affiliated itself to the International Workers' Association (IWA), a syndicalist political international, as the organisation's British section. The SWF was broadly syndicalist in orientation, rather than specifically anarcho-syndicalist. Many of the initial members of the SWF were pacifists, who rejected violence as a means of class conflict.

The SWF experienced a period of growth through the 1950s and 1960s. In 1965, an estimated 150 syndicalists were organising in Britain; 100 were affiliated with the exiled CNT and 50 with the SWF. During the late 1970s, the structures of the SWF began to change under the influence of new members, who had filtered into the organisation from the punk subculture. By the end of the decade, it only had one remaining local branch, located in Manchester.

=== Direct Action Movement ===
In March 1979, the remaining members of the SWF reorganised themselves into the Direct Action Movement (DAM), which experienced a period of growth throughout the early 1980s. The DAM initially sought support from the international syndicalist movement, but its organisational capacity was weak and British trade unionism was comparatively strong, so it was only capable of supporting existing industrial unions in Britain. Although the successor to an older organisation, the DAM themselves acknowledged that "syndicalism in this country has not really existed since the early 1920s." Its Direct Action magazine, initially edited in the cut-and-paste style of a punk fanzine, took a more serious and professional editorial style when reporting on the industrial disputes of the 1980s.

The DAM supported the miners' strike of 1984–1985, which it recognised as a movement directed by the union rank-and-file, in spite of its own criticisms of the authoritarian politics of NUM leader Arthur Scargill. The DAM raised funds for miners' support groups, protested on picket lines and organised a congress to encourage solidarity actions from workers in other industrial sectors. One member of the DAM, the Doncaster-based Dave Douglass, was one of the few striking miners that self-identified as an anarchist; he was also critical of the NUM leadership and organised direct actions to "improve the effectiveness of the miners' strike". In 1985, the DAM co-founded Anti-Fascist Action, within which it was active into the 1990s. The DAM later participated in the opposition to the poll tax and the protests against it.

In the late 1980s, the DAM began attempting to establish its own anarcho-syndicalist unions as an alternative to the reformist unions. Its only success on this front was the establishment of the Dispatch Industry Workers Union (DIWU), which organised delivery couriers from 1989 to 1992. This change in policy provoked a number of splits from the organisation, as some members thought all unions were inherently reformist, even if they were anarcho-syndicalist in orientation. In 1986, the group Syndicalist Fight (SyF) split off and later merged into the Anarchist Communist Federation (ACF); and in 1987, the Anarchist Workers Group (AWG) split off and later merged into the Revolutionary Communist Party (RCP).

=== Solidarity Federation ===
In 1994, the remnants of the DAM reorganised into the Solidarity Federation (SF), which adopted a new strategy. Rather than attempting to establish independent anarcho-syndicalist unions, the SF instead seeks to create networks of workers within existing unions, with the intention of participating in workplace struggles and propagandising for anarcho-syndicalism. After its formation, the SF became the British section of the IWA. It also took over publication of the magazine Direct Action, which was previously published by the DAM.

== Campaigns ==
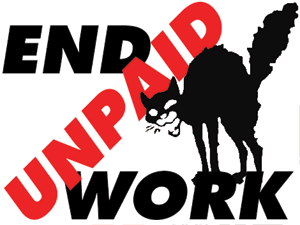
SolFed End Unpaid Work 2012 campaign logo

SolFed has carried out a series of direct action campaigns within the industries its members work in. One SolFed member, working within the National Union of Rail, Maritime and Transport Workers (RMT), organised a "workmates experience" campaign in the London Underground, where they organised against outsourcing and built solidarity between union and non-union workers. At Brighton University, SolFed established a "pop-up union" to organise precarious workers, despite the opposition of the University and College Union (UCU).

SolFed has formed close ties with the British branch of the Industrial Workers of the World (IWW) and the two frequently collaborate, despite ideological and organisational differences. In Nottingham, the local SolFed group has participated in the Nottingham Association of Subversive Activists (NASA). On International Workers' Day, in 2000, SolFed participated in an anti-capitalist demonstration in London, during which a statue of Winston Churchill was vandalised. Following the rise of far-right politics in the United Kingdom in the 21st century, SolFed rejected working with Unite Against Fascism, which it criticised for "class collaboration", and instead called for anti-fascism to be carried out through class struggle. This culminated in the early 2010s, SolFed supported the establishment of the Anti-Fascist Network, formed to provide an organised anarchist opposition to the English far-right.

Solidarity Federation's 2012 national campaign against workfare initially focused specifically on Holland and Barrett, a health supplement corporation making use of placements staffed by unpaid benefits claimants. On 5 July 2012, after a sustained series of pickets at Holland and Barrett stores across the UK, the company announced via social media and its website that it was pulling out of the workfare scheme, citing negative publicity.

In October 2013, Brighton SolFed launched its Hospitality Workers Campaign, which aimed to bring together hospitality workers facing precarity and encourage solidarity and mutual aid between them. The campaign attracted support from the city's Spanish migrant workers, many of whom worked in hospitality or healthcare for low pay and in poor working conditions. SolFed interviewed hospitality workers in order to identify abusive employers and inform them of their rights as workers in the UK. Workers were also provided with legal representation and encouraged to take industrial action. The campaign attracted significant support from hospitality workers, who for the most part were not unionised.

In 2013, SolFed members in Liverpool participated in the People's Assembly Against Austerity, but they later expressed disappointment with the experience, reporting that it had consisted largely of speeches without any organisation of political action. The following year, they collaborated with members of the Left Unity party to organise social centres, International Women's Day events and political demonstrations against austerity.

== Organisation ==
The Solidarity Federation is organised into industrial networks and local groups. SolFed has a federal structure, based on decentralised and autonomous groups, which it sees as both a means and an end. Following the organisational principles of anarcho-syndicalism, SolFed upholds participatory decision-making, in which individuals have the right to self-determination and decisions are driven by popular consensus. Members of SolFed are required to pay dues, which enables them to elect local representatives and a secretariat. SolFed opposes participation in political parties, as exemplified in its slogan "The union not party". Unlike other anarcho-syndicalist organisations, SolFed is not itself a trade union, but rather a political organisation dedicated to the promotion of self-organisation and class consciousness.

Its industrial networks are organised as non-hierarchical and federal structures, which they intend to act as a synecdoche of post-capitalist social structures. This practice reflects a prefigurative politics, in which SolFed seeks to build "a new society within the shell of the old"; although unlike other anarcho-syndicalists, who see their own organisations as a prefiguration of a post-capitalist society, SolFed has resisted characterising itself as a universal form for organising society. Through its industrial networks, SolFed has organised in several economic sectors, including in the communication, education, public administration and transportation sectors.

Although their primary focus is on organising industrial workers, in the 21st century, SolFed has increasingly emphasised other forms of organising outside the setting of the workplace. SolFed has established a number of local organisations, which engage in community organising and social activism, alongside support for workplace activities. By the 2010s, SolFed counted 10 local groups, with 4 more locals in formation. It is relatively small organisation, with only a few hundreds members; as of 2015, it claimed to have 200 members.

SolFed refuses to pay for professional union officials, as it believes their interests would become separate from those of the rank-and-file and therefore make them more likely to seek compromises with employers. All official positions in the SF, whether taking minutes, chairing meetings or negotiating with other organisations, are temporary and unpaid positions, in order to keep their interests in line with that of the rank-and-file.

== Ideology ==
The Solidarity Federation advocates for solidarity, which it views as a means for workers' empowerment. SolFed believes that profit-seeking is the main cause of the exploitation of labour, political repression and economic inequality. As anarcho-syndicalists, SolFed considers the workplace to be the venue best suited for class conflict and favours the organisation of workers into industrial unions. SolFed's preferred tactics include various different direct actions, from strike actions to workplace occupations and sabotage.

SolFed seeks short-term improvements to working conditions, and in the long-term, desires the abolition of the state and capitalism. They ultimately advocate for the establishment of an industrial economy based on workers' self-management, in which individual needs are prioritised over profit. SolFed considers the general strike to be a means to achieve such a social revolution.

In a break from traditional anarcho-syndicalism, which upholds "strategic centralism", SolFed argues for a diversity of tactics in order to oppose all forms of oppression and hierarchical power. While agitating against economic oppression, SolFed also proposes the establishment of localised organisations to oppose other forms of oppression, including environmental degradation, sexism, racism and homophobia. SolFed is also opposed to existing institutions of mass media, which it considers to be a mouthpiece for the ruling class, and has called instead for the establishment of independent media.

As a means to achieve workers' self-management, SolFed historically preferred workplace occupations over strike actions; they believed that in order to deny the managerial class access to the workplace, the workers themselves would be required to have a higher level of solidarity and cohesive self-organisation than any strike action. In his book Rebel Alliances, historian Benjamin Franks criticised this argument against strike actions, which he said constituted a "hierarchy of industrial action, which freezes methods according to their predetermined position".

== Bibliography ==
- Barberis, Peter; McHugh, John; Tyldesley, Mike (2000). "Solidarity Federation". Encyclopedia of British and Irish Political Organizations: Parties, Groups and Movements of the 20th Century. A&C Black. pp. 167–168. ISBN 978-0-8264-5814-8.
- Cross, Rich (2014). "British anarchism in the era of Thatcherism". In Smith, Evan; Worley, Matthew (eds.). Against the Grain: The British far left from 1956. Manchester: Manchester University Press. ISBN 9780719095900. OCLC 941255608.
- Franks, Benjamin (2005). "British anarchisms and the miners' strike". Capital & Class. 29 (3): 227–254. doi:10.1177/030981680508700113.
- Franks, Benjamin (2006). Rebel Alliances: The Means and Ends of Contemporary British Anarchisms. AK Press. ISBN 1904859402.
- Franks, Benjamin (2009). "Solidarity Federation". In Ness, Immanuel (ed.). The International Encyclopedia of Revolution and Protest. pp. 1–2. doi:10.1002/9781405198073.wbierp1378. ISBN 9781405198073.
- Franks, Benjamin; Kinna, Ruth (2014). "Contemporary British Anarchism". Revue LISA. 12 (8). doi:10.4000/lisa.7128.
- Kinna, Ruth (2005). Anarchism: A Beginner's Guide. Oneworld Publications. ISBN 978-1-85168-370-3.
- Lamb, Peter (2024). "International Workers Association". Historical Dictionary of Socialism. Rowman & Littlefield. pp. 272–273. ISBN 9781538159194.
- Maiguashca, Bice; Dean, Jonathan; Keith, Dan (2016). "Pulling together in a crisis? Anarchism, feminism and the limits of left-wing convergence in austerity Britain" (PDF). Capital & Class. 40 (1): 37–57. doi:10.1177/0309816815627388.
- Raekstad, Paul (2018). "Revolutionary practice and prefigurative politics: A clarification and defense" (PDF). Constellations. 25 (3): 359–372. doi:10.1111/1467-8675.12319.
- Raekstad, Paul (2019). "Micropolitics and Social Change: Deleuze and Guattari for Anarchist Theory and Practice". Deleuze and Anarchism. Edinburgh University Press. pp. 65–82. doi:10.1515/9781474439091-006. ISBN 9781474439091.
- Roca, Beltrán; Martín-Díaz, Emma (2017). "Solidarity Networks of Spanish Migrants in the UK and Germany: The Emergence of Interstitial Trade Unionism". Critical Sociology. 43 (7–8): 1197–1212. doi:10.1177/0896920516645659.
- Testa, M. (2017). "'A Good Deal of Disorder' or The Anarchists & Anti-Fascism In The UK". Anarchist Studies. 25 (2): 9–25. ISSN 2633-8270.
