= Rita Milton =

British anarchist

- Born: 31 May 1924; Kelvinside, Glasgow, Scotland
- Died: 17 December 2011 (aged 87)
- Era: Long 20th century
- Organization: Freedom Press
- Title: Editor of Sewing Machine Times and The Journal of Sex Education
- Movement: Anarchism
- Spouse: Huw Warburg (died 1983)
- Partner: Philip Sansom (1944–1955)
- Children: 1
- Father: Alexander Inglis Milton
- World War II
- Branch: Women's Land Army
- Conscripted: 1941–1945
- Battles: Home front

Rita Milton (31 May 1924 – 17 December 2011) was a Scottish-born anarchist who worked as an editor and was associated with the Freedom Press. She was regarded as a gifted orator, once being described by The New York Times as a "fiery female Demosthenes."

== Biography ==
=== Early years ===
Milton was born in the Kelvinside area of Glasgow on 31 May 1924. Her father was Alexander Inglis Milton, an employee of a local museum in Annan and editor of a left-wing journal. She had three elder brothers, one of whom fought in the Spanish Civil War. As a teenager she worked as a messenger girl on the Isle of Arran, and later a shopworker, before joining the Women's Land Army at the outbreak of the War.

=== Activism ===
After the War, Milton began to work with her father as an editor in Glasgow. There, she was exposed to the ideas of anarchists such as Frank Leech and became involved with the local movement. In 1946 Milton travelled to England, whilst there she stayed at the Burgess Hill School with Betty and Tony Gibson, where she began an intimate relationship with Philip Sansom. As a result of this relationship, Milton would settle with Sansom in Hampstead and become part of the Freedom Press milieu. She also took up work as an editor of The Journal of Sex Education and Sewing Machine Times, which were published commercially by Freedom Press.

Fellow Scottish anarchist Stuart Christie recalled Milton being a regular public lecturer at Speakers' Corner in Hyde Park during the 1960s. However, although Milton was skilled at public speaking she also contributed to debates through writing, such as a piece she authored in Freedom, in which she defended the tactic of direct action in contrast to, what she perceived to be, the departure toward a more sedate form of anarchist praxis espoused by Colin Ward.

=== Personal life ===
In the 1950s Milton met Huw Warbarg, with whom she would be married unitl his death in 1983. Together they had a child.

Milton died after a period of ill health on 17 December 2011.
