= Communist League (UK, 1919) =

- Abbreviation: CL
- Leader: Guy Aldred
- Founded: 16 March 1919
- Dissolved: Early 1920
- Split from: Socialist Labour Party
- Succeeded by: Anti-Parliamentary Communist Federation
- Newspaper: The Communist
- Ideology: Left communism Anarcho-communism; Abstentionism
- Political position: Far-left

The Communist League was a small far-left organisation in the United Kingdom which existed during the year of 1919. Its stated goal was to establish a network of workers' councils that would "resist all legislation and industrial action directed against the working class, and ultimately assuming all power, establish a working class dictatorship".

== History ==
Following the Allied victory in World War I and the success of the Bolsheviks in the October Revolution, a growing number of British anarchists became increasingly attracted to Marxist theory and began to synthesize a form of "anarcho-Marxism". This coincided with the re-emergence of anti-parliamentarism within the ranks of many left-wing political parties, including the Independent Labour Party (ILP), Socialist Labour Party (SLP) and British Socialist Party (BSP). This process culminated in an attempt to unite the anarcho-communists with the anti-parliamentary socialists under a single formation, an initiative that was taken up by dissident London branch of the SLP, which in February 1919 proposed the convocation of a unity conference to bring together the nascent British communist movement. The London SLP preemptively drew up a provisional constitution for the new organization, including:

1. a call for local workers' committees and councils to aim at seizing the means of production and creating a proletarian dictatorship;
2. the ultimate aim of a republic of federated communes;
3. and a declaration that the parliamentary vote is obsolete and that direct industrial action should be adopted as an alternative.

The Communist League was founded in March 1919 by the London District Council of the Socialist Labour Party and various anarchist groups in London and Scotland, including Guy Aldred's Glasgow Anarchist Group. The anarchist newspaper Freedom published a report on the founding conference in which it noted that, despite the League not being itself a specifically anarchist organization, its anti-parliamentary program provided a big step in the direction of anarchism for many of its members, while also reporting on early disputes between the League's members over theoretical issues such as "economic determinism" and the "dictatorship of the proletariat".

The establishment of the Communist League was welcomed further in April 1919 at a London anarchist conference, which claimed that the new-found anti-parliamentarism among socialists and communists was due to anarchists' past propaganda work and called for closer cooperation between anarchists and the Communist League, which eventually resulted in a joint conference being held between the two. Anarchist criticisms of the League even led to the decentralisation of the organization's governing body into a "Local Delegate's Committee", which followed the anarchist model of elected delegates subject to instant recall, with the aim of preventing the rise of "boss domination and cliqueism".

The League set about "agitating, educating and organizing" the working class, entering into workers' committees in order to develop their class consciousness, which the League argued would eventually lead to the overthrow of capitalism and the committees then taking over the administration of the newly-established communist society. As its official organ, the League began publishing a newspaper, The Communist, in which George Rose remarked that:

we know that there must develop the great working class anti-Statist movement, showing the way to Communist society. The Communist League is the standard bearer of the movement; and all the hosts of Communists in the various other Socialist organisations will in good time see that Parliamentary action will lead them, not to Communism but to that bureaucratic Statism correctly named by Hilaire Belloc the ‘Servile State’.... Therefore, we identify ourselves with the Third International, with the Communism of Marx, and with that personification of the spirit of revolt, Bakunin, of whom the Third International is but the natural and logical outcome.

— George Rose, May 1919

The organization quickly expanded over the subsequent months, forming a number of branches mostly in London and Scotland. A South Wales branch was also established by coal miners in Treherbert, led by the Welsh trade unionist William Mainwaring, who registered his disagreement with one particularly section of the League's constitution, stating that: "to say [the parliamentary vote] is obsolete will lead many to suppose that it once was useful." The League later entered into negotiations with the aim of merging with other anti-parliamentary communist groups such as the Workers' Socialist Federation (WSF), but this proposal was rejected by the WSF's leader Sylvia Pankhurst. Attempts by Aldred to open discussions with the ILP, the SLP and the BSP did not prove fruitful either.

Although Aldred had expressed in an October 1919 article that the revolutionary moment was "drawing closer and closer together on a platform of practical revolutionary effort", divisions still existed over the question of parliamentary elections. In an attempt to find a "tactical compromise" between the parliamentary position of electoral participation and the anti-parliamentary position of the election boycott, the Communist League decided to imitate Sinn Féin's abstentionist tactic of using elections as a platform for their propaganda, while pledging not to take their seats if elected. When a by-election was called in Paisley, the Communist League attempted to put this proposal into action, offering to support an SLP candidate that stood on an abstentionist platform. However, the local SLP leader William Paul ended up declining the offer to stand entirely and took on the hardline anti-parliamentary position. Declaring that "every vote withheld is a vote for socialism", Paul called for an election boycott that particularly targeted the Labour Co-op candidate John Biggar, resulting in the victory of the Liberal candidate and former Prime Minister H. H. Asquith.

Tensions between the anarchists and the Marxists within the League had also heightened during the latter half of 1919, with fierce debates breaking out over the theoretical differences that had been present in the organization since the founding conference. By the turn of 1920 these tensions completely boiled over, leading to the complete dissolution of the Communist League. Aldred went on to found the Anti-Parliamentary Communist Federation the following year, while the Stepney branch of the League took part in the establishment of the Communist Party (British Section of the Third International) along with Sylvia Pankhurst's Workers' Socialist Federation and E. T. Whitehead's Labour Abstentionist Party.

== Bibliography ==
- Federation, Anarchist Communist (1996). "Anarchist Communism in Britain". Organise! (42). London: 11–18. OCLC 500079933. Archived from the original on 1 April 2006.
- Hayes, Mark (2005). The British Communist Left: a contribution to the history of the revolutionary movement 1914-1945. London: International Communist Current. ISBN 1897980116. OCLC 642281773.
- Jones, Rob (October 1991) [1989]. "Anti-Parliamentarism and Communism in Britain, 1917-1921". Discussion Bulletin. Grand Rapids, Michigan: Industrial Union Caucus in Education. OCLC 13302352.
- Shipway, Mark (1988). Anti Parliamentary Communism: the movement for workers' councils in Britain, 1917-45. London: Macmillan. ISBN 033343613X. OCLC 468642120.
