= John Taylor Caldwell =

Scottish seaman, anarchist and biographer

John Taylor Caldwell (14 July 1911 – 12 January 2007) was a Glasgow-born anarchist communist and close associate and biographer of Guy Aldred. He wrote two volumes of autobiography which recount his early life growing up in Belfast, his early career as a mariner and his political development, as well as his close involvement with Aldred and the United Socialist Movement.

== A career agitator ==
Caldwell joined Aldred's United Socialist Movement (USM) shortly after its inception in 1934, eventually becoming secretary. He was closely involved in the group's agitational work in support of anarchism in Spain before becoming – along with Jenny Patrick and Ethel MacDonald – a full-time "family" member of Aldred's Strickland Press when it was set up in 1939.

Like Aldred, Caldwell was a conscientious objector and resisted conscription during World War II. For many years, Caldwell shared with Ethel MacDonald a third-floor flat in Gibson Street, Hillhead, Glasgow. He acted as election agent for Aldred on four occasions.

== Last of the quartet ==
Following Guy Aldred's death in 1963, Caldwell continued the work of both the USM and Strickland Press before finally closing the doors of their radical bookshop (somewhat coincidentally) in May 1968.

As Aldred's literary executor, he collated a microfilm archive of Aldred's journals and pamphlets as well as his unfinished autobiography, No Traitor's Gait and the manuscript of Caldwell's own, unfinished, three-volume biography, The Red Evangel. The latter was subsequently published, in an abridged form, as Come Dungeons Dark: The Life and Times of Guy Aldred, Glasgow Anarchist.

In 1966, to celebrate what would have been Aldred's 80th year, Caldwell produced a small collection of quotations, In Memoriam: Quotations from the writings of Guy A. Aldred

== Media ==
- Part One of a discussion with J. T. Caldwell on the history of anarchism in Glasgow (Audio available as Ogg, MP3, Streaming MP3 or WMA >22MB)
- Part Two of a discussion with J. T. Caldwell on the history of anarchism in Glasgow (Audio available as Ogg, MP3, Streaming MP3 or WMA >22MB)
- Photograph (ref 560.77.305) from the Burrell Collection Photo Library shows members of the USM in 1938(?) with John Taylor Caldwell (extreme right) and Guy Aldred (6th from right).

== Bibliography ==
- Caldwell, J.T. [ed. and introduction, uncredited] (1966), In Memoriam Guy A. Aldred, 1886 ― 1963: Quotations from the writings of Guy A. Aldred, Strickland Press, Glasgow
- Caldwell, John T. (1978), "Guy Aldred, Anti-Parliamentarian, 1886-1963: A Memoir", Essays in Scottish Labour History: a tribute to W. H. Marwick, ed. MacDougall, I., ISBN 0-85976-039-1
- Caldwell, John Taylor (1988). Come dungeons dark: the life and times of Guy Aldred, Glasgow anarchist. Edinburgh: Luath Press. ISBN 0-946487-19-7.
- Caldwell, John Taylor (1994). Severely dealt with: Growing Up in Belfast and Glasgow. Bradford: Northern Herald. ISBN 1-870605-90-X.
- Caldwell, John Taylor (1999). With fate conspire: memoirs of a Glasgow seafarer and anarchist. Bradford: Northern Herald. ISBN 0-9523167-1-4.
