= Anti-Parliamentary Communist Federation =

- Abbreviation: APCF
- Leader: Guy Aldred (1921–1933); Frank Leech (1933–1937); William McDougall (1937–1945)
- Founded: January 1921
- Dissolved: 1950s
- Preceded by: Communist League
- Succeeded by: United Socialist Movement (1934)
- Headquarters: Glasgow, Scotland
- Newspaper: The Commune (1923–1928); The Council (1931–1933); Solidarity (1938–1945)
- Ideology: Council communism Anarcho-communism
- Political position: Far-left

The Anti-Parliamentary Communist Federation (APCF) was a communist group in the United Kingdom. It was founded by the group around Guy Aldred's Spur newspaper – mostly former Communist League members – in 1921. They included John McGovern.

== History ==
When Sylvia Pankhurst's Communist Party dissolved itself into the newly founded Communist Party of Great Britain (CPGB) in January 1921, many libertarian communists refused to join due to the CPGB's policy of parliamentarism. Guy Aldred's Glasgow Communist Group immediately responded by publishing the Red Commune paper, in which they advocated for anti-parliamentarism in the form of election boycotts and abstentionism, inviting fellow libertarian communists to a conference at which the Anti-Parliamentary Communist Federation was established. Rose Witcop was sent as a delegate to the Third Congress of the Communist International, where she received an offer of financial backing on the condition that the APCF joined the CPGB and abandoned any anti-parliamentarism, which the Federation refused and cut ties with the International.

During the 1922 United Kingdom general election, Aldred stood in Glasgow Shettleston on a platform of abstentionism, in a move that was opposed by anarchists within the APCF, with the Federation refusing to lend official support to the campaign. Aldred came last in the election, with only 470 votes. The APCF subsequently distributed propaganda calling for workers to participate in an election boycott during both the 1923 and 1924 general elections.

After the Communist Workers' Party (CWP) dissolved in June 1924, the APCF became Britain's sole anti-parliamentary communist organisation. This led the British anti-parliamentary movement to move away from the internationalism that had influenced the CWP and focus more on local issues, particularly events happening in Glasgow, the headquarters of the APCF. It even rejected the idea of building a new political international, with the Communist Workers' International later complaining that the APCF had made no attempt to contact them.

=== Opposition to the Labour Party ===
After the Fourth World Congress of the Communist International decided to advance the tactic of a united front between the Communists and the Labour Party, the APCF further rejected the International's policy, arguing that the Labour Party was an "anti-working class movement, the last earthwork of reaction."

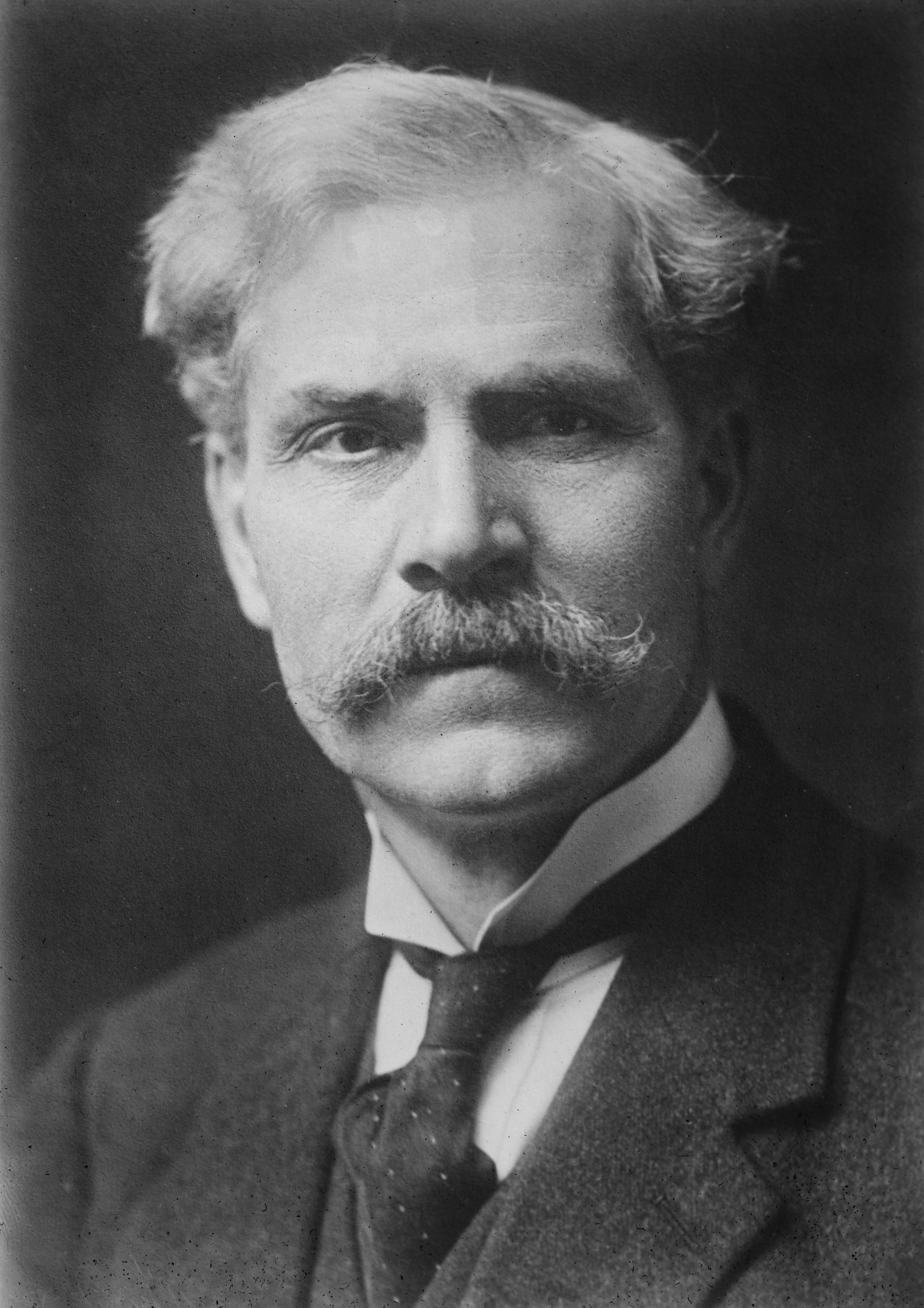
Ramsay MacDonald, the first Prime Minister from the Labour Party.

When Labour formed its first government with Liberal support, the APCF's changed the masthead of its newspaper the Commune to "An Organ Of His Majesty's Communist Opposition", indicating their opposition to the Labour government and publishing lengthy criticisms of the new government ministers. Labour's "parliamentarian" policies were further criticised by the APCF as what amounted to a "continuation of capitalism", which the Federation contrasted with several of its own "anti-parliamentarian" policies that were to be implemented for the "overthrow of capitalism". Following the electoral defeat of the Labour government and Ramsay MacDonald's resignation as Prime Minister, the APCF published in the Commune a report of the government's time in office, in which it claimed that the MacDonald ministry had "functioned no differently from any other Capitalist Government".

In their October 1926 issue of Commune, the APCF reviewed the record of MacDonald's first Labour government, highlighting its use of the military to suppress strike actions and concluding that it had "functioned no differently from any other Capitalist Government". The APCF also criticised the Labour government's nationalisation policies as a form of state capitalism, instead advocating for social ownership as an alternative to state ownership, claiming that workers had "nothing to gain" from nationalised industries. The APCF also targeted attacks against individual members of the Labour Party, such as the Secretary of State for the Colonies J. H. Thomas, the jingoistic trade union leader Ben Tillett and the Glaswegian anti-parliamentarist turned politician John Clarke. The APCF also disrupted a number of meetings that hosted Arthur Henderson, who they condemned for his participation in David Lloyd George's war government, leading to seventeen people being arrested. The APCF declared that "there exists as much Socialism in the constitution and the activity of the Parliamentary Labour Party as there is divinity in the priesthood" and criticised the CPGB for its continued attempts to affiliate with the "anti-Socialist" Labour Party, reiterating its opposition to the Comintern's united front tactic.

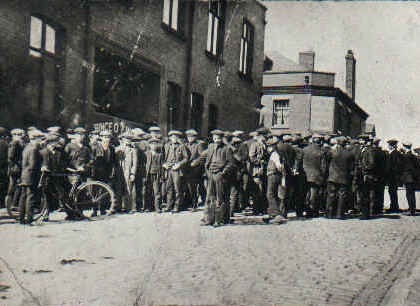
Tyldesley miners outside the Miners Hall during the 1926 General Strike.

Having previously opposed the National Minority Movement's tactic of working within reformist trade unions, by the time the 1926 general strike broke out, they again opposed the CPGB's collaboration with the General Council of the Trades Union Congress (TUC), instead advocating for power to be transferred directly to strike committees and mass meetings. After the TUC called off the strike, the APCF condemned the actions of the TUC's leaders, which they believed had proven their own position that reformist trade unions had become another part of the capitalist system.

The waning of the Revolutions of 1917–1923, rise and fall of the Labour government and the defeat of the general strike had all contributed to a sense of pessimism regarding the prospects of any coming social revolution. Despite entering a period of decline, the anti-parliamentary communist movement was maintained throughout the late 1920s by the APCF, which continued to uphold the communist programme that it had developed since before the Russian Revolution had ever taken place. But before long, the APCF suffered a split.

=== Split ===
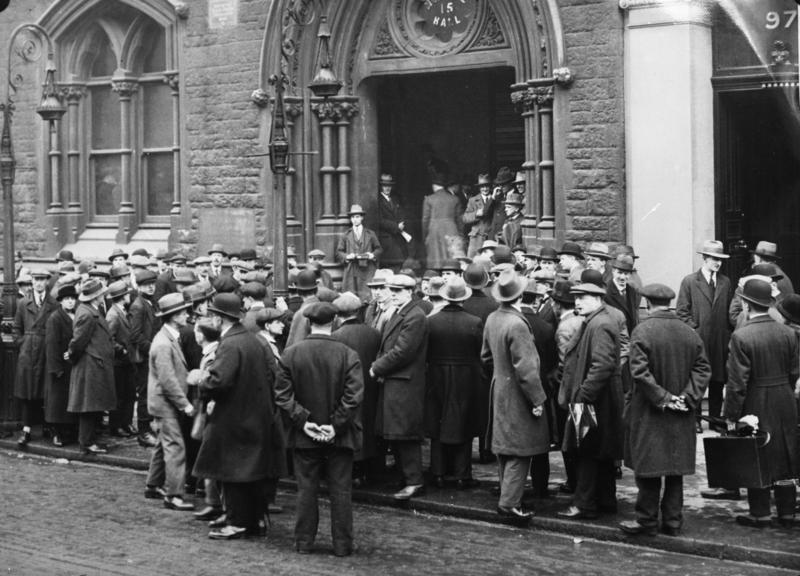
Unemployed people in front of a workhouse in London, during the Great Depression.

The fallout from the Great Depression led the APCF to proclaim that the end of capitalism was imminent, as the economic collapse had destroyed the material conditions that incentivised reformism and - by extension - parliamentarism. In the APCF's appeal To Anti-parliamentarians, they argued that concessions could only be granted to the working class during a period of upswing, but following the economic crisis it had become impossible to secure reforms, concluding that "grim necessity will compel the workers to social revolution."

In 1929, Aldred correctly predicted the formation of a National Government by a coalition of Ramsay MacDonald's Labour Party and Stanley Baldwin's Conservative Party, to which he responded by declaring that "Anti-Parliamentarism has arrived." The free speech fight in Glasgow had also provided an impetus for the split within the APCF, as various different organizations had come together to form a Free Speech Committee, in order to engage in a direct action campaign to re-establish freedom of assembly and freedom of speech in the city. The Committee eventually evolved into a workers' council to maintain the unity that had been achieved, but it quickly declined until the council was effectively another front of the APCF. Those that had participated in the movement, including Aldred, became convinced of the necessity to unite the various disparate workers' organisations into a single movement capable of defeating capitalism. They saw the workers' councils as a means of achieving an end to sectarianism, as they could allow the participation of all factions "without impeaching the integrity of any", concluding on the necessity of abandoning anti-parliamentary agitation in favour of building a workers' council movement. Arguing that, since parliamentarism itself had collapsed with the establishment of the National Government, it was no longer necessary to propagate anti-parliamentarism, Aldred resigned from the APCF in February 1933.

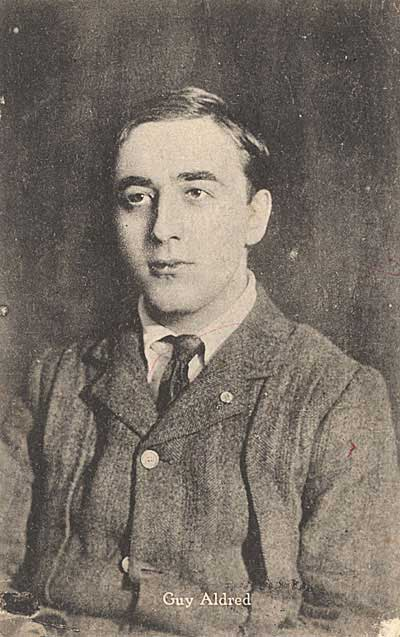
Guy Aldred, leader of the APCF until 1933, when he split off to form the United Socialist Movement.

The remaining members of the APCF disagreed with Aldred's conclusions and maintained the organisation as it was, causing a split within the movement that divided anti-parliamentarists throughout the 1930s. In spite of the APCF's continuation, Aldred claimed that it had, in fact, dissolved following his departure and considered his new organisation - the United Socialist Movement (USM) - to be the APCF's direct successor. The APCF had been in a temporary hiatus, but resumed activities in 1935 with the publication of two pamphlets. One was The Bourgeois Role of Bolshevism by the Dutch Group of International Communists (GIC), which argued that the Russian Revolution had from the outset been a bourgeois revolution, aiming to transform the Russian economy from agrarian feudalism to industrial capitalism, where the Bolsheviks had used the mass movement of peasants and workers to seize power and overrule both of them. The other was Organizational Questions of the Russian Social Democracy by Rosa Luxemburg, which they gave the name Leninism or Marxism? to. The text criticised Vladimir Lenin's view on the role of democratic centralism in a vanguard party to lead a revolution, arguing that revolutionary spontaneity was the driving force of any labour movement and emphasising that any dictatorship of the proletariat should be a mass movement of the whole working class rather than the work of a minority political party.

Despite the split, the APCF attempted to co-operate with other like-minded groups both in Britain and abroad. After Paul Mattick's Chicago-based United Workers' Party (UWP) rebuffed Aldred's attempts to unite it with the Communist League of Struggle (CLS), the APCF worked actively to maintain its links with the UWP and their magazine, the International Council Correspondence. The APCF came together with the USM, as well as the Independent Labour Party (ILP) and Revolutionary Socialist Party (RSP), to establish the Socialist Anti-Terror Committee in Glasgow, a short-lived organisation formed in order to oppose the ongoing "Great Terror" in the Soviet Union. Meanwhile, Aldred's "domineering personality" brought a number of people to resign from the USM, with some joining the APCF. Nevertheless, the APCF's influence within British politics remained small. By this time, a wave of pessimism regarding the revolutionary prospects in Britain and around the world permeated through the weak and isolated anti-parliamentary movement, now confined to merely analyzing political events from the sidelines. European council communist ideas began to work their way into the APCF's ideology, which started to pick up decadence theory, on display in their May 1936 issue of Advance, in which one members analyzed the Italian invasion of Ethiopia as a product of Italy's capitalistic need to expand in the face of bankruptcy. They also made use of decadence theory in their article Capitalism Must Go!, in which they explained overproduction, coupled with a rise in unemployment and a reduction in demand, to be the key reason for the Great Depression.

The outbreak of the Spanish Revolution was welcomed by the APCF, not only a key challenge to the rise of fascism, but one which had also caused a resurgence in the activities of the previously declining British anti-parliamentary communist movement.

=== Spanish Civil War ===
Although the APCF had previously criticised the reformist tendencies displayed by the Spanish labour movement with the Popular Front victory in 1936 Spanish general election, they declared that the reforms brought by the new government were due to the popular movement that had elected the government to power in the first place, describing the Popular Front as a "capitalist administration" and calling for system change rather than mere regime change. But their views on the Popular Front government changed in the wake of the nationalist coup. They had initially analyzed the coup through an anti-parliamentary lens, commenting that: "The uselessness of parliament should be obvious to all [...] wherever the ruling class decides that parliament fails to express their desires, parliament will be abolished!" But they swiftly took on a notably constitutionalist approach towards the nascent civil war by focusing on the nationalists' breaking of "international law" and describing the Popular Front as an "orthodox democratic government". These terms were used in an attempt to coax intervention from the United Kingdom and France into the war, with the APCF criticising the British government for refusing to provide aid to the Spanish Republic and for placing an arms embargo on the "legally and democratically constituted government of Spain".

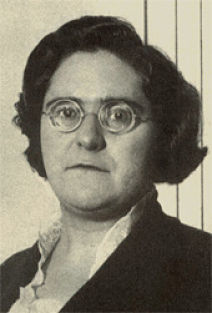
Federica Montseny, the anarchist Minister of Health in the government of Francisco Largo Caballero.

Red and black CNT-FAI flag

Months after leaders of the CNT joined the Republican government under Francisco Largo Caballero, the APCF published a pamphlet by the anarchist Minister of Health Federica Montseny which defended anarchist collaboration with the republicans, under the cause of the "unity of all anti-fascists". The initial unity of various differing factions under the Republican banner was a source of inspiration to the APCF, who urged the formation of a similar united front in Britain. The Federation even went as far as to suspend its journal, instead collaborating with the Freedom newspaper on a joint monthly publication Fighting Call.

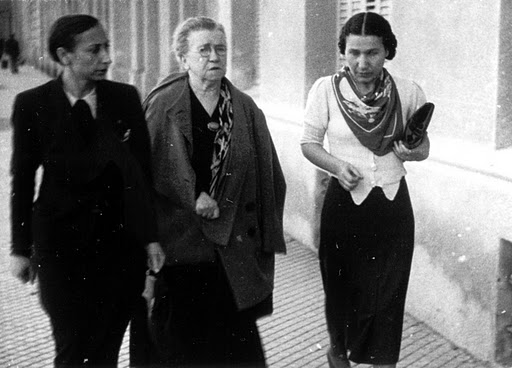
Emma Goldman in Spain with Lucía Sánchez Saornil.

Despite the APCF's call for unity, its relations with the USM remained hostile, with the two groups competing for recognition as the official representative of the CNT-FAI in Britain, the APCF eventually winning the bid with the support of Emma Goldman. As a result, the APCF's publications Fighting Call and Advance became solely dedicated to publishing material from the CNT-FAI, without criticism, comment or editorial. The feud between the APCF and USM continued when their respective delegates were sent to Spain, with the APCF's delegate Jane Patrick being expelled from the Federation before she even arrived, causing a confrontation between the two groups in Glasgow.

By April 1937, relations between the APCF and USM started to improve, following the resignation of the APCF's Frank Leech, who had frequently prevented their co-operation, going on to found the Glasgow Anarchist Federation (GAF). The following month, the two collaborated on the publication of the Barcelona Bulletin, which published their delegates' accounts of the May Days in Barcelona, providing a sympathetic view of the revolutionary faction represented by the anarchists of the CNT-FAI and the Trotskyists of the POUM. While the USM had long-since revised its position of supporting the Republican government, due to reports from its delegate Ethel MacDonald, it was only after the May Days that the APCF followed suit. The APCF took the position that the policy of the united anti-fascist front was one of collaboration with capitalism, publishing an article by MacDonald which stated that "Anti-Fascism is the new slogan by which the working class is being betrayed." When MacDonald was arrested and imprisoned by the Catalan government, the APCF organised a Defence Committee to secure her release, with MacDonald escaping Spain and returning safely to Glasgow by November 1937, leading the Defence Committee to lend its support to other prisoners and refugees of the war.

Despite the revision of their position towards the republican government, the APCF never quite diverted from its original policies, publishing some articles that supported the government and others that supported the revolutionaries, often both in the same issue of Solidarity. In the second issue of the journal, the APCF published a report from Spain which argued that the civil war could have been avoided entirely "if the workers had taken control and eliminated the government", while also publishing a call for a general strike to force an end to Britain's arms embargo on the Republican government. In a subsequent issue released after the nationalist victory in the war, they published an article by the Friends of Durruti Group which concluded that "Democracy defeated the Spanish people, not Fascism."

=== World War II ===
With the conclusion of the Spanish Civil War, it quickly became apparent that a major global conflict was on the horizon. The APCF's analysis of what became World War II was one of a military conflict between capitalist nations rivalling for supremacy, rejecting the dominant notion of it being a war of democracy against fascism. They called for workers to resist the coming war, claiming that in the making of this war British business interests would "destroy capitalist democracy and every vestige of workers' democracy to ensure the continuity of their capitalism (i.e. their profits)."

When the war broke out, the APCF adopted a revolutionary defeatist position, proclaiming: "Down with Nazism and Fascism, but also down with all imperialism, British and French included!" Pointing out that "all the Capitalists are aggressors from the workers' point of view", they called for the destruction of all states that were party to the conflict, including the Soviet Union. The APCF later elaborated that they stood for the defeat of the Axis powers not by the Allies, but by the workers of those countries, while also standing simultaneously for the defeat of the Allies by the workers of their own countries, essentially calling for a world revolution to end the war. Given that since the outbreak of the war the trade unions had been opposing strike action, the APCF believed that the creation of new unofficial forms of organisation were necessary, proposing the formation of workers' councils as an independent and revolutionary alternative to established trade unions and political parties.

In the Winter 1940/41 issue of Solidarity, the APCF argued that "the recent Spanish tragedy [in which] the incensed ruling class repudiated even their own bourgeois legality and unleashed the most bloody butchery of the proletariat the world has ever witnessed" had proven their case of parliamentarism being a dead-end. They criticised the Socialist and Communist Parties for their respective insistence on the need for a "revolutionary parliament" or "workers' government" to replace the Churchill war ministry, declaring that "at the first threat of resistance to their will, they would immediately establish a military dictatorship and by sheer weight of arms smash any attempt at progressive legislation." The APCF noted that in Britain at the time, parliament was only being consulted after events had already occurred. This led them to adopt the position that Guy Aldred had taken when he left the Federation to found the USM: that parliamentarism was obsolete, therefore taking an anti-parliamentary position was no longer necessary. This became the impetus for the APCF changing its name to the Workers' Revolutionary League (WRL) in October 1941.

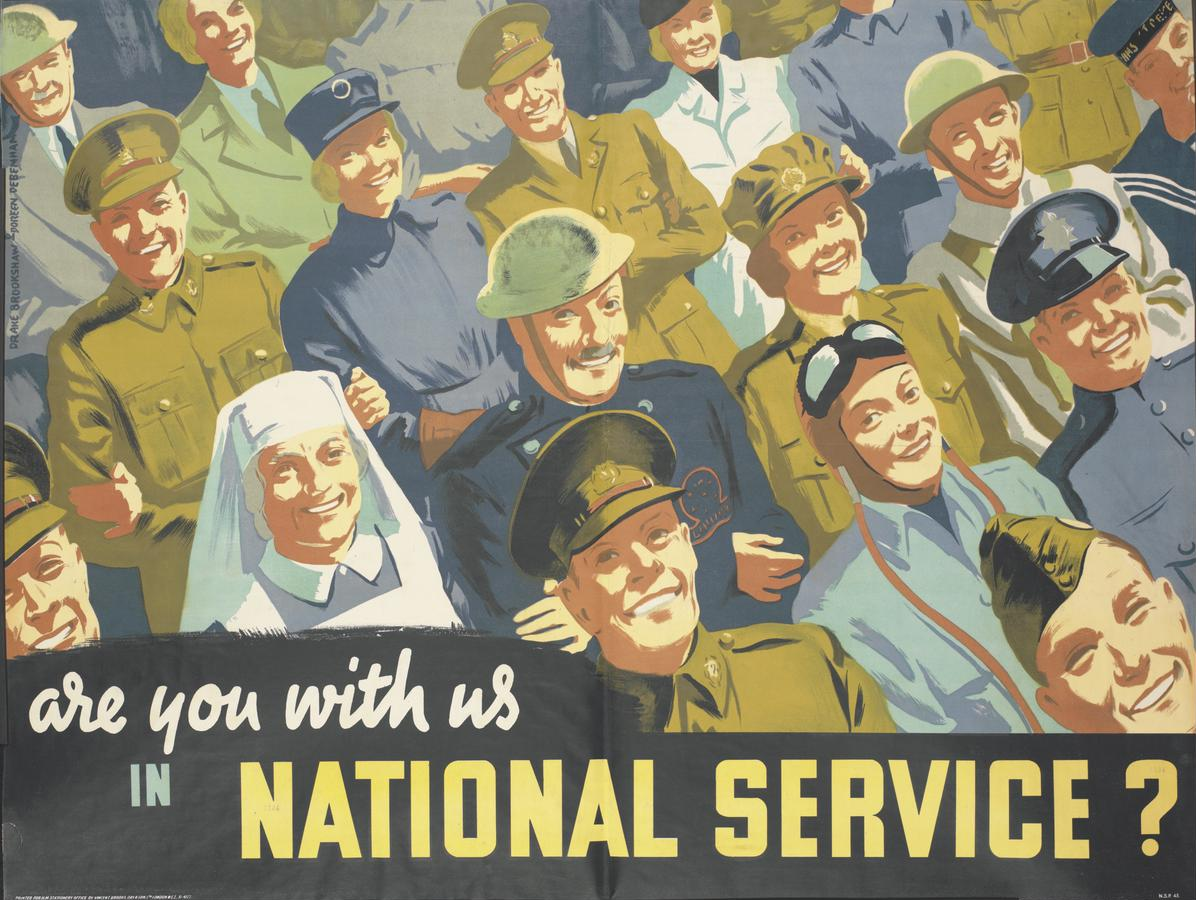
World War II propaganda poster encouraging national service.

In order to coordinate resistance to the war effort, the WRL came together with the USM and the GAF to organise the Scottish No-Conscription League, in which the WRL's Willie McDougall served as chair for a time. A conscientious objector from the WRL, William Dick, defended himself in front of a military tribunal in June 1942 on anarcho-pacifist grounds, declaring his moral opposition to war, the state and violence in general, which granted him an unconditional exemption from conscription.

In October 1942, the WRL established one of its main initiatives to combat sectarianism: the Workers' Open Forum, a weekly meeting open to all parties organised on the model of a workers' council. The Forum invited speakers from GAF and the USM, but also from further afield groups such as the Socialist Party of Great Britain (SPGB), Socialist Labour Party (SLP), Workers' International League (WIL), Independent Labour Party (ILP), Common Wealth Party (CWP), Peace Pledge Union (PPU), as well as a number of secularists, Georgists and industrial unionists. Over time, the WRL's activities became more and more subordinated to the "interests of the Workers' Open Forum."

By the end of the war, the Workers' Revolutionary League had dissolved itself almost entirely into the activities of the Workers' Open Forum, continuing to provide a regular meeting space in Glasgow until the late 1950s. John Taylor Caldwell commented that the closure of the Open Forum marked the end of an era, one in which public speaking began to die out as audiences left the inner cities for the suburbs. The post–World War II economic expansion brought a definitive end to the anti-parliamentary communist movement, as many of the arguments it had made during the early-20th century no longer held weight.

== Positions ==
=== Anti-Parliamentarism ===
The APCF continued to propagate its anti-parliamentary principles, arguing that parliament was a fundamental institution of the capitalist system which could only ever serve the interests of the ruling class. It rejected the idea that parliamentarism could serve as a means for the socialisation of the means of production, holding instead that this could only be brought about through spontaneous direct action by the working class itself, which would eventually result in the dissolution and replacement of institutions (including parliament) with a network of workers' councils. In an issue of the Commune, the APCF declared that "the parliamentary runner seeks not to emancipate the workers but to elevate himself" and warned that participation in parliamentary politics would inevitably lead to the participant gravitating towards reformism, careerism and opportunism.

They also argued that parliamentarism was a distraction, in which working class voters were dealt with "the impossible task of discovering honest representatives to play at capitalist legislation, instead of addressing itself to the Socialist education of the masses". To the APCF, parliamentary political activity meant delegating tasks to leaders, where anti-parliamentary political activity meant the working classes themselves directly taking on those tasks, thus parliamentarism had to be opposed as it "empties the proletariat of all power, all authority, all initiative". The APCF therefore rejected the Socialist Party of Great Britain (SPGB) assertion of revolutionary parliamentarism, as they believed it would disempower workers by delegating their own tasks to the individuals that ran for election, and labelled all left-wing advocates of parliamentarism as "counter-revolutionaries".

=== Position on Totalitarianism ===
The APCF analyzed totalitarianism to be a product of capitalism's boom and bust cycles, as when capitalism tended towards monopoly, democracy became incompatible with the new monopolistic economy, leading to the institution of dictatorship and the outbreak of war as a means to pacify the working classes. A member of the APCF furthered the position that totalitarianism was a means for capitalism to preserve itself through a period of crisis, stating that "capitalism in crisis cannot afford to indulge in democracy".

The APCF considered that the warring states were all equally capitalist and equally totalitarian, arguing that the needs of wartime were accelerating the development of the democratic powers towards totalitarianism, a position summed up in their statement that "Democratic capitalism can only fight fascist capitalism by itself becoming fascist." This view was supported by Ernst Schneider, a seaman and veteran of the German Revolution that had joined the group following his departure from Nazi Germany, who stated in 1944 that "under the smokescreen of freeing Europe from "totalitarianism", this very form of monopoly capitalism is developing everywhere." Schneider went on to predict that nationalisation was inevitable and that what had previously happened in the Axis states was already developing in the Allied states.

The APCF took the implementation of Defence Regulation 18B as evidence of their position on the development of totalitarianism in Britain, due particularly to its introduction of conscription. In response, it reprinted some anti-war remarks made by James Connolly in 1917: "In the name of freedom from militarism it establishes military rule; battling for progress it abolishes trial by jury; and waging war for enlightened rule it tramples the freedom of the press under the heel of a military despot."

=== Position on Vanguardism ===
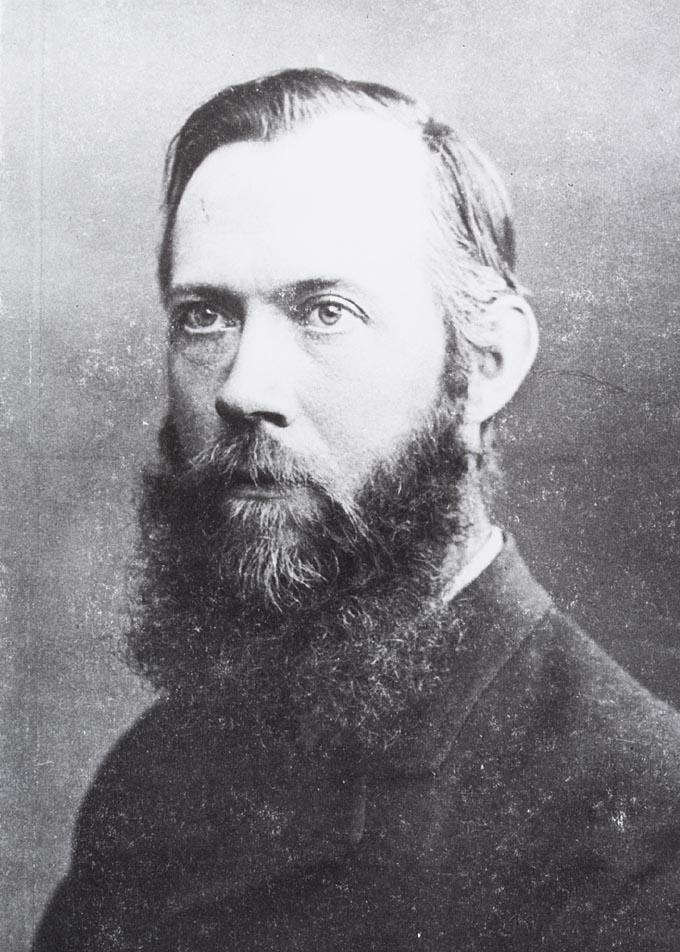
Anton Pannekoek, a source of inspiration for many of the APCF's council communist positions.

The role of political parties in the labour movement was of particular interest to the APCF, which published in its journal Solidarity a debate between the council communists Anton Pannekoek and Paul Mattick, who rejected the party form, and the De Leonist Frank Maitland, who argued in its favour. The position of the APCF itself lay somewhere between the two, arguing that the development of class consciousness could only be organically induced by material conditions rather than by an organisation, while also holding that workers that had already developed class consciousness needed to unite together to lead those that had not. Like Pannekoek's conception of a revolutionary organisation, which the APCF sought to emulate, its goal would not be to seek power for itself but to serve as a propaganda organ to "educate, agitate and enthuse; perhaps even to inspire" the working classes to take self-organised direct action. In their arguments against vanguardism, the APCF stated:

Instead of struggling for supremacy, revolutionary parties should aim as far as possible at complete liquidation into the workers' soviets, where they can advance their policies by courage, initiative and example. Practical, instead of abstract problems, will be on the order of the day, and the best solutions, irrespective of who advocates them, should be adopted without prejudice. We will find, in practice, that the Vanguard interpenetrates and overlaps all existing parties; and that workers, previously of no party at all, are able to contribute in a surprising degree and to over-shadow many who were previously considered as indispensable and of the elite!

The APCF took a hardline against sectarianism during World War II, opening up its journal Solidarity as a platform to a variety of left-wing positions and personalities, including anarcho-communists, council communists, De Leonists, Trotskyists, Marxists and members of the ILP. The APCF strongly rejected vanguardism, which it believed forced revolutionary groups into competition with one another, claiming that as no single group can hold correct positions on every issue or contain all the best elements of the working class, these groups needed to co-operate with each other in an alliance with a commonly agreed-upon programme. This anti-sectarian attitude extended to collaboration with the USM and GAF, with the APCF's Willie McDougall even going out of his way to distribute the USM's Word and the GAF's War Commentary.

=== Position on the Soviet Union ===
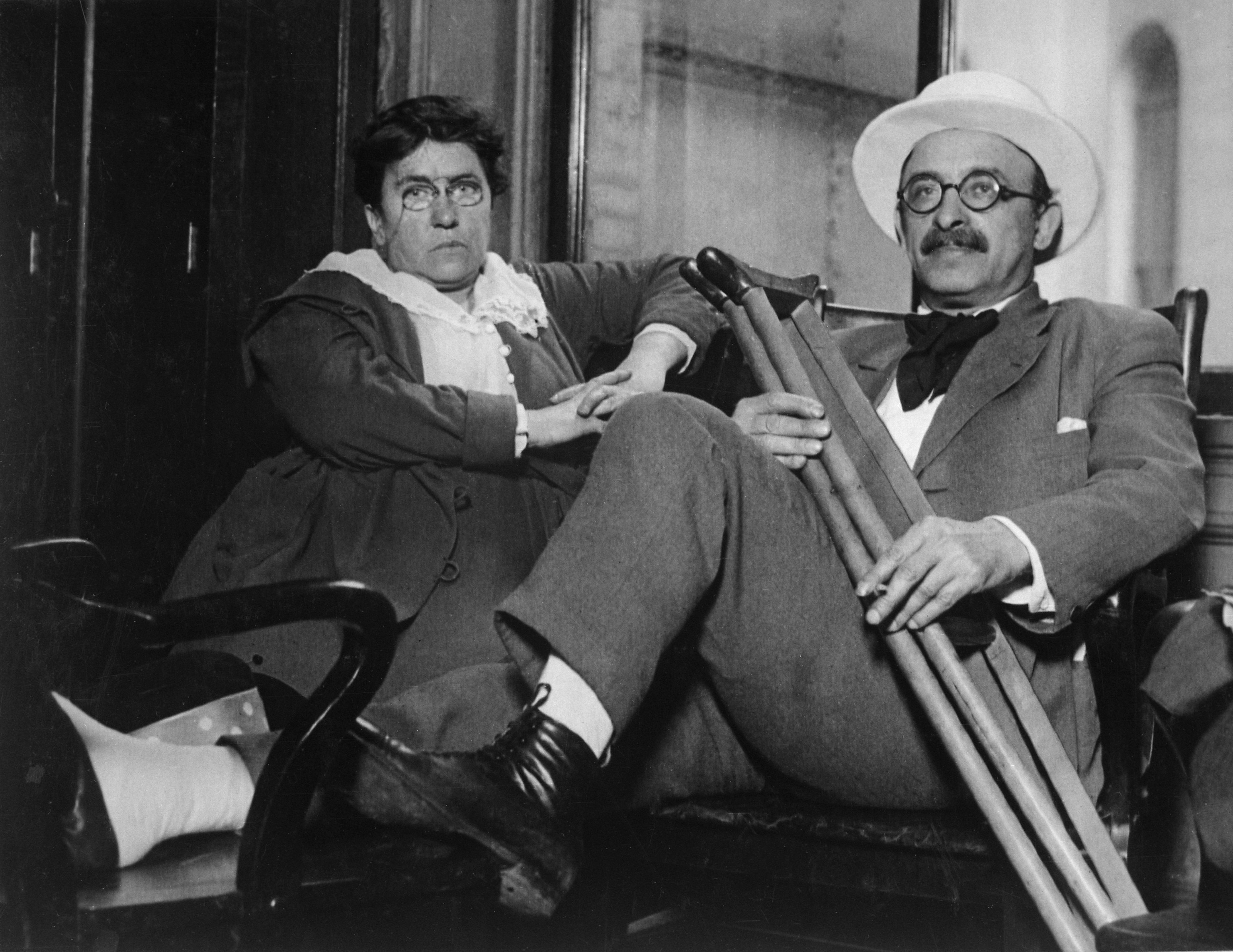
Alexander Berkman and Emma Goldman, who fled Soviet Russia following the repression against the anarchist movement in 1921.

Although the APCF had initially supported the Soviet Union, by this time accounts of repression were starting to emerge from the country, with its newspaper the Commune even publishing letters from anarchists reporting that revolutionaries were suffering political persecution, despite Aldred's own skepticism of such reports. Aldred was criticised for this by Alexander Berkman and Emma Goldman in their correspondence with the paper, to which Aldred responded by fiercely denouncing them. In May 1925 the APCF re-affirmed its defense of the Soviet Union, but also called on the Comintern to "abandon its opposition to left communism" so that the APCF could unite alongside it.

But as more evidence of state repression accumulated over time, Aldred and the APCF were no longer able to continue ignoring or disputing reports of persecution and finally started to denounce the Bolsheviks. By November 1925, the APCF had denounced the October Revolution as a "counter-revolution" and finally began to display solidarity with its "comrades rotting in Soviet prisons", taking up the defense of Gavril Myasnikov, whose Workers Group had formed a left-communist opposition to the New Economic Policy. Aldred later apologised for his earlier unwillingness to believe the allegations and admitted that his skepticism was "most unjust to the imprisoned and persecuted comrades in Soviet Russia". In the Commune of that month, the APCF denounced the pro-Soviet CPGB as standing for "bureaucracy, capitalism and militarism" and claimed that it had "nothing in common with Communism or the working-class struggle".

Adopting the critical line that had previously been taken up by the Communist Workers' Party (CWP), the APCF held that the Soviet Union was not in fact communist but a state capitalist system, where "The State [...] owns the means of production in opposition to the workers themselves." The APCF argued that with the introduction of the New Economic Policy (NEP) "peasant-bourgeois" interests had triumphed over "proletarian-communism", due to a compromise between the two that had been sought by Vladimir Lenin, and concluded that "the interests of the peasants cannot be reconciled with those of the industrial proletariat".

When the activities of Leon Trotsky's Left Opposition came to its attention, the APCF disregarded it as being one faction in a power struggle for control over the state capitalist machinery, and noted the irony that Trotsky was being persecuted by the repressive apparatus he had himself developed, although later attempts were made to foster co-operation between anti-parliamentarists and Trotskyists.

== Bibliography ==
- Caldwell, John Taylor; Shipway, Mark (2006). An Introduction to Guy Alfred Aldred and the Anti-Parliamentary Communist Federation. Hobnail Press. OCLC 940387143.
- Federation, Anarchist Communist (1996). "Anarchist Communism in Britain". Organise! (42). London: 11–18. OCLC 500079933. Archived from the original on 1 April 2006.
- Hayes, Mark (2005). The British Communist Left: a contribution to the history of the revolutionary movement 1914-1945. London: International Communist Current. ISBN 1897980116. OCLC 642281773.
- Jones, Rob (October 1991) [1989]. "Anti-Parliamentarism and Communism in Britain, 1917-1921". Discussion Bulletin. Grand Rapids, Michigan: Industrial Union Caucus in Education. OCLC 13302352.
- Shipway, Mark (1988). Anti Parliamentary Communism: the movement for workers' councils in Britain, 1917-45. London: Macmillan. ISBN 033343613X. OCLC 468642120 – via AF-North.
