= Anarchist Federation of Britain =

British anarchist and anti-war organisation, 1937–1950

- Abbreviation: AFB
- Leader: Collective leadership
- Founder: Frank Leech
- Founded: April 1937
- Dissolved: 1950
- Split from: Anti-Parliamentary Communist Federation
- Succeeded by: Syndicalist Workers Federation
- Headquarters: Glasgow
- Newspaper: War Commentary
- Ideology: Anarchism; Anti-militarism; Factions: Anarcho-syndicalism; Anti-fascism; Anti-parliamentary communism Civil libertarianism Council communism
- Political position: Far-left

The Anarchist Federation of Britain participated in the anti-war movement during World War II, organising a number of strike actions and providing support to conscientious objectors. Over time it gravitated towards anarcho-syndicalism, causing a split in the organisation, with the remnants reconstituting themselves as the Syndicalist Workers Federation.

== History ==
After Frank Leech resigned from the Anti-Parliamentary Communist Federation (APCF) in April 1937, he went on to establish the Glasgow Anarchist-Communist Federation (GACF) in August 1937. By the outbreak of World War II, the GACF merged with the Marxian Study Group to establish the Glasgow Anarchist Federation, the local Glaswegian branch of a nationwide Anarchist Federation of Britain (AFB). The main mouthpiece of the AFB during the war was War Commentary, which characterised the war as "one between rival Imperialisms", taking an anti-war position that centered class conflict.

In response to the war, the Glaswegian anarchists called for workers to "resist conscription" by organising a general strike, but when this did not occur they instead started to advocate for individual workers to take direct action against the war economy. The AFB even went so far as to refuse Air Raid Precautions and compulsory fire lookout schemes, with Frank Leech being imprisoned in HM Prison Barlinnie for his refusal and going on hunger strike until his release, after his friends finally agreed to pay his fine. During the war, the AFB collaborated with the APCF and the United Socialist Movement (USM) in the activities of the No-Conscription League. In August 1940, four Glaswegian members of the AFB were charged with incitement, as the group had offered advice and support for conscientious objectors, but they were eventually acquitted. Over the course of the war, dozens of AFB members were imprisoned for year-long sentences after they refused physical examinations.

It was the AFB's stance against conscription that attracted many industrial workers to its ranks, with one Glaswegian member reporting a rise in anti-state sentiment throughout the Clydeside and criticising the opposition of mainstream trade unions to any strike action. The AFB was broadly supportive of strike actions throughout the war, with the Glaswegian branch supporting a wildcat strike by bus workers, which had been opposed by both their own union and the Labour Party, and eventually resulted in the dismissal and replacement of the striking workers. In September 1943, AFB members were directly involved in strike actions by coal miners in Lanarkshire, which continued in spite of the opposition by the National Union of Scottish Mineworkers (NUSM) and Communist Party of Great Britain (CPGB), only ceasing after the release of imprisoned miners and resulting in fines being paid for the work stoppage. In December of that same year, the AFB went on to support a women's strike at a Glaswegian engineering factory, although lack of support from the male workers forced them to quit the strike by January 1944. The AFB later emphasised the lack of trade union membership among the factory's women workers, who had instead formed strike committees, which they characterised as an unconscious act of anarcho-syndicalism.

In April 1944, after the industrial conscription of coal miners had provoked a strike in Tyneside, members of the Workers' International League were arrested and charged for supporting the strike, which led the AFB to participate in their defence as part of the Anti-Labour Laws Victims Defence Committee. In February 1945, a Glaswegian member published a report that detailed the CPGB's lack of support for strike actions and its collaboration with the mainstream trade unions. The report also directly criticised all forms of trade unions for reformism, which they claimed had integrated the unions into the capitalist economy.

During the war, members of the AFB had predicted that a revolutionary wave would spread throughout Europe as the warring states collapsed due to the conflict, but the Allied victory effectively ensured that there would be no post-war outbreak of revolution.

The AFB subsequently entered a period of decline, as it fell to internal divisions and broke up into its constituent sections. A split occurred between the Glaswegian and London-based groups, with the former taking on an anarcho-syndicalist position, while the latter gravitated towards egoist anarchism. The London group rapidly fell apart, as a result of the emigration and death of its two leading members. By the 1950s, the old guard of the anarchist movement had disappeared from the scene. Although the historian Peter Marshall attributed the split to the rise of the anarcho-syndicalists, the anarchist Albert Meltzer insisted that it was down to a personal conflict between the AFB's leading members. By this time, the remnants of the AFB had reconstituted themselves as the Syndicalist Workers Federation (SWF), which eventually came to be known as the Solidarity Federation (SF).

In 1963, attempts were made to reestablish the AFB along the lines of the anarchist synthesis, but the internal contradictions between the various tendencies that made up the new organisation resulted in it lacking any clear strategy. After the AFB experienced a number of defections to Trotskyist parties such as the International Socialists (IS) and the International Marxist Group (IMG), one faction that emerged from the disarray was the Organisation of Revolutionary Anarchists (ORA), which adopted platformism in reaction to the AFB's lack of formal organisation.

== Bibliography ==
- Cross, Rich (2014). "British anarchism in the era of Thatcherism". In Smith, Evan; Worley, Matthew (eds.). Against the Grain: The British far left from 1956. Manchester: Manchester University Press. ISBN 9780719095900. OCLC 941255608.
- Franks, Benjamin (2006). Rebel Alliances: The Means and Ends of Contemporary British Anarchisms. Edinburgh: AK Press. ISBN 1904859402. OCLC 493946935.
- Marshall, Peter H. (2008) [1992]. Demanding the Impossible: A History of Anarchism. London: Harper Perennial. ISBN 978-0-00-686245-1. OCLC 218212571.
- Shipway, Mark (1988). Anti Parliamentary Communism: the movement for workers' councils in Britain, 1917-45. London: Macmillan. ISBN 033343613X. OCLC 468642120.
