= Ethel MacDonald =

Scottish anarchist

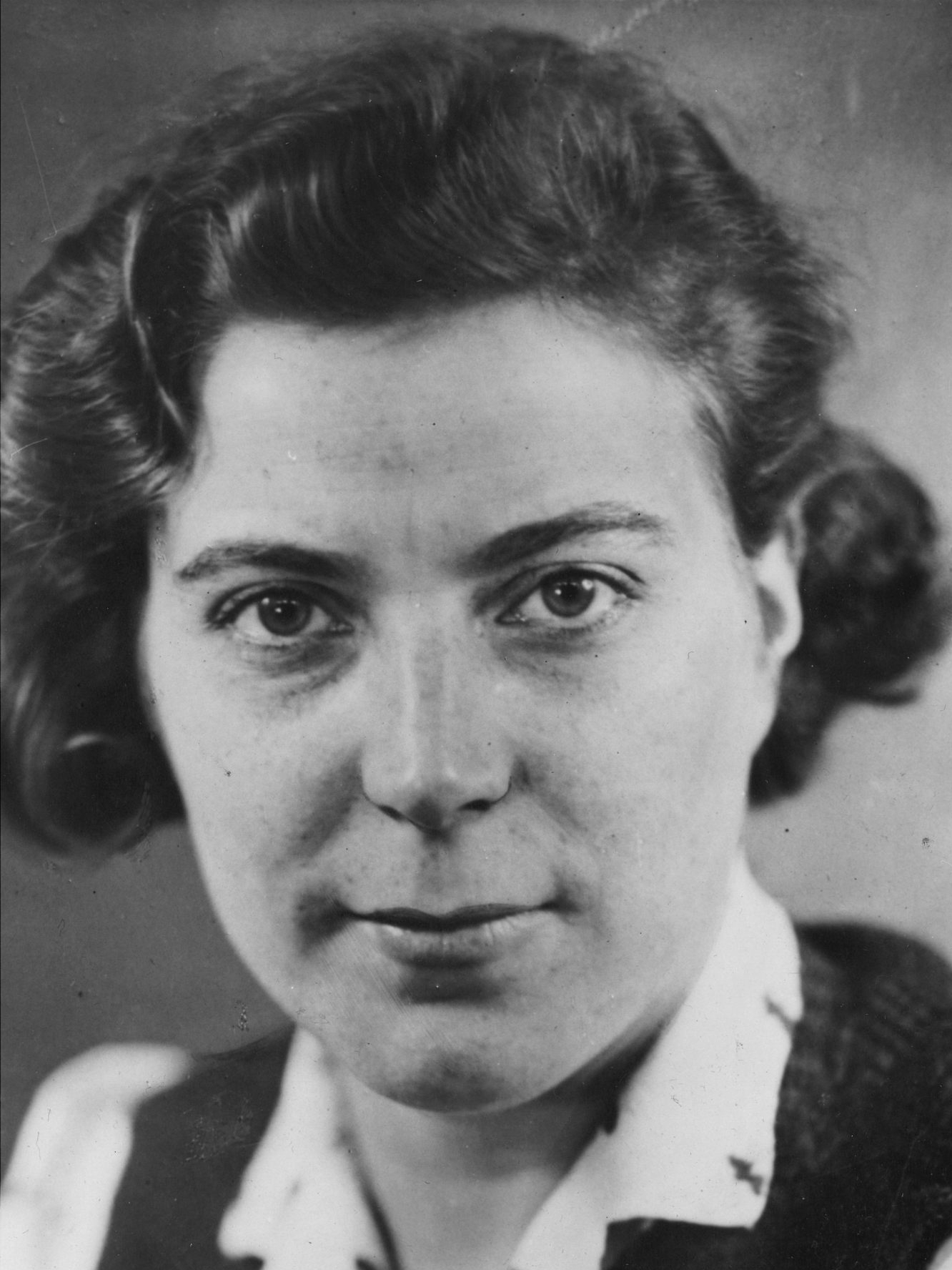
- Born: Camelia Ethel MacDonald; 24 February 1909; Bellshill, North Lanarkshire, Scotland
- Died: 1 December 1960 (aged 51); Knightswood Hospital, Glasgow, Scotland
- Other name: The Scots Scarlet Pimpernel
- Occupations: Activist, broadcaster
- Employer: The Strickland Press
- Organization: Anti-Parliamentary Communist Federation (APCF)
- Movement: Anarchism; Anti-fascism; National Confederation of Labor (CNT); United Socialist Movement (USM)
- Parents: Andrew McDonald (father); Daisy Watts (mother)

Camelia Ethel MacDonald (24 February 1909 – 1 December 1960) was a Glasgow-based Scottish anarchist, activist, and 1937 Spanish Civil War broadcaster on pro-Republican, anti-fascist Barcelona radio.

== Early years ==
Camelia Ethel McDonald was born on 24 February 1909 in Bellshill (Note: Dolan 2009, p. 7 stated 'Motherwell'. In contrast the Evening Times and Gray 2009, p. 168 stated 'Bellshill'.), North Lanarkshire, Scotland, to Andrew McDonald, a coach painter, and Daisy Watts. MacDonald was the fifth of nine children. She left home at 16, joined the Independent Labour Party (ILP) and worked at various jobs. In 1925 she met Guy Aldred, who later appointed her as the Secretary of the Anti-Parliamentary Communist Federation (APCF) upon its inception in 1933. In June 1934 she joined him in the formation of the United Socialist Movement (USM). During this time she became fluent in French and German.

== Spanish Civil War ==
In November 1936 MacDonald travelled to Barcelona with Guy Aldred's partner, Jenny Patrick, to represent and show the support of the Scottish anarchist movement for the Republican faction in the Spanish Civil War. In January 1937 she began to transmit regular English-language reports on the war on Barcelona's widely heard anarchist radio station run by the National Confederation of Labor (CNT).

In the crackdown following the events of May 1937, MacDonald assisted the escape of anarchists wanted by the Communist secret police and smuggled into prison letters and food for fellow anarchists held by regional authorities. Through her activities in helping anarchists escape Spain, she became renowned in the British press as the Scots Scarlet Pimpernel. Between July and November 1937, she was a national figure in the newspapers, with daily reports and inquiries as to her whereabouts and activities.

=== The death of Bob Smillie ===
On 12 June 1937, Bob Smillie, who was a member of the Independent Labour Party that had been fighting with the POUM forces for the Republicans, died while being held by the Valencia police. The police stated that his death had been caused by peritonitis. However, rumours flew around Valencia that he had been beaten to death. MacDonald began reporting the latter version of events on her radio broadcasts and in newspaper articles, which eventually led to her being captured and imprisoned on several occasions. She recalled:

'My arrest was typical of the attitude of the Communist Party... Assault Guards and officials of the Public Order entered the house in which I lived late one night. Without any explanation, they commenced to go through thoroughly every room and every cupboard in the house. After having discovered that which to them was sufficient to hang me - revolutionary literature etc.' (Ethel MacDonald, speaking to the Glasgow Evening Times upon her return to Scotland.)

MacDonald eventually escaped custody and left Spain, making her way back to Glasgow where she arrived on 7th November 1937. En route she travelled through Paris and Amsterdam, where she denounced the actions of the communists in Spain. She continued to publicly discuss the case of Bob Smillie. But her version of events was disputed in the UK by David Murray, who was 'a Scottish freelance journalist and businessman from Motherwell', 'a family friend of the Smillies' and a member of the Independent Labour Party, who was in Spain 'on a private business venture.' Murray was also the leading advocate of the view that Smillie's death 'was an unfortunate accident', that he died of peritonitis. In contrast, George Orwell found Smillie's death 'hard to explain.' Georges Kopp, who had been Smillie's commander in Spain, supported the view that Smillie had been murdered, while Buchanan (2013) concluded:

'It may be that the ILP leadership, lacking the evidence to sustain an allegation that Bob Smillie had been murdered on political grounds, chose not to see his death as part of a wider pattern of Communist-inspired terror in Spain.' (Buchanan 2013, p. 116). (Note: Wildemeersch 2013, pp. 56–66 and Buchanan 2013, pp. 106–116 discussed the case of Smillie's death in detail.)

== Later years and death ==
After her return from Spain, Ethel MacDonald worked closely with Guy Aldred, Jenny Patrick, John Taylor Caldwell and other Glasgow anarchists (Note: Anarchist author David Goodway (2014) described Glasgow as 'the only British city ever to have had a significant anarchist movement (in contrast to London's Continental exiles and Jewish immigrants)'. (Goodway 2014, p. 4).) on a shoestring publishing enterprise, The Strickland Press which, beginning on May Day 1938, published regular issues of the USM organ, The Word. They continued their activities through World War II and the 1950s peace movement, with MacDonald considered as the unofficial manager, bookkeeper and printer of The Strickland Press.

Ethel MacDonald was diagnosed with multiple sclerosis in February 1958 and lost her ability to speak. Within three years she died in Glasgow's Knightswood Hospital on the 1st December, 1960, at the age of 51.

== The creation of the Aldred Collection ==
Caldwell (1999) recalled that, after Aldred died in 1963, he 'gathered together the letters, manuscripts, and suchlike material from Guy's desk drawers and elsewhere, and put them in a tea-chest, finally to be placed in the Mitchell Library as "The Aldred Collection".' Also, he 'gathered together all Guy's private library pamphlets, filling three large suitcases.' Finally to these he 'added several thousand back numbers of The Word and sent them, by request, to the Strathclyde University Library.'
