= Jenny Patrick =

Scottish anarchist

Jane Patrick
- Born: Jenny Hamilton Patrick; 1884
- Died: 1971 (aged 86–87)
- Occupation: Typesetter
- Organization: The Strickland Press
- Political party: APCF
- Other political affiliations: USM; CNT
- Movement: Anarchism
- Partner: Guy Aldred (d.1963)
- Career
- Show: CNT radio bulletin
- Country: Revolutionary Catalonia

Jane Hamilton Patrick, born Jenny Hamilton Patrick (1884–1971), was a Scottish anarchist of some standing, and played a crucial role in a number of radical organisations.

Patrick was a printer and typesetter by trade. She became active in politics, when she joined the Glasgow Anarchist Group by 1914. She was also a partner of Guy Aldred's for some thirty years until his death.

Patrick with other anarchists had an ambivalent attitude towards the formation of the Communist Party of Great Britain (CPGB), and along with Aldred, she helped form the Anti-Parliamentary Communist Federation (APCF) a breakaway group. The key points of contention were the proposed use, by the new group, of parliament and its relationship to the Labour Party. This is seen as a left-wing break from the communist movement and Comintern's view is best encapsulated in Lenin's "Left-Wing" Communism: An Infantile Disorder with its comments chiefly directed at Sylvia Pankhurst. Patrick and others were simply carrying on a popular tradition which had been developed through the politics of the Socialist League and the struggles of syndicalism in Britain prior to the inception of the CPGB.

With the setting up of the APCF, the authorities began to investigate the group, and Aldred, Patrick, Douglas McLeish and Andrew Fleming were eventually arrested and charged with sedition within the first year of its inception. Patrick along with others was eventually found guilty and given a sentence of three months. The charges relate to anti-parliamentary activity, the promotion of the Sinn Féin electoral tactic and undermining of parliament.

In 1924 Aldred and Patrick helped set up a journal called The Commune.

In 1934, along with Aldred, Patrick set up the United Socialist Movement (USM), an anarcho-communist organisation which helped publish a journal called The Word. Both Ethel MacDonald and Patrick went to Spain at the outbreak of the Spanish Civil War as respective representatives of their groups. MacDonald appears to have been representing the USM and Patrick the APCF, since she was also a member of that.

In Spain, Patrick ended up in Madrid editing the English-language version of Frente Libertario. By 1937 she had moved to Barcelona, helping with the Confederación Nacional del Trabajo's (CNT) radio bulletin. Her and Ethel's firsthand encounter with the Barcelona May Days was reported by Aldred, but she returned to Glasgow by 1937.

After returning before the course of the war, Patrick along with others would establish The Strickland Press.
