= Ernst Schneider (communist) =

Ernst Schneider (23 July 1883, Königsberg- 1963, Southend) was a German sailor who played an active part in the German Revolution of November 1918 and who participated in the Hamburg Uprising of October 1923. He remained active in the German Workers' movement until being arrested by the Gestapo in 1935. In 1939, he reached England, where he joined the Anti-Parliamentary Communist Federation.

Schneider started worker as a harbourman, working on launches and lighters which did not leave the harbour. He joined the Social Democratic Party of Germany (SPD), but soon moved on to become involved with anarcho-syndicalism, editing Der Kampf, the journal of the Hamburg Anarchist Federation.

== See also ==
- Anarchism in Germany
