= Anarchist Federation of Gran Canaria =

Organization on the island of Gran Canaria

- Federación Anarquista de Gran Canaria
- Abbreviation: FAGC
- Formation: May 15, 2011; 15 years ago
- Type: Anarchist federation
- Purpose: Right to housing
- Origins: 15-M Movement
- Methods: Squatting
- Official language: Spanish
- Website: anarquistasgc.noblogs.org

The Anarchist Federation of Gran Canaria (Spanish: Federación Anarquista de Gran Canaria, FAGC) is an anarchist organization on the island of Gran Canaria, founded in 2011. It is focused on defending the right to decent housing.

== History ==
In a context of social and labor precariousness, as well as the economic crisis in the Canary Islands, the Anarchist Federation of Gran Canaria was born from the confluence of different participants of the 15-M Movement in the Plaza de San Telmo in Las Palmas de Gran Canaria, within which they identified themselves as the black bloc. They shared "the ácrata sentiment and a great desire to promote a change in this unjust system." From then on, the FAGC was made up of "groups and individuals from different parts of the island, by people and groups with different experiences, sensitivities and preferences". The group, partly made up of non-anarchist members, is made up of 90% women.

== Premises and actions ==
The FAGC try to seek self-sufficiency based on the premise, "do as you can and receive as you need", and they have aligned themselves against any type of dirigisme. They claim the active role of the street and the need for a horizontal and self-managed action. They defend that it is necessary to first look for practical solutions and then develop the theory, thus exposing the problems of practice in a self-critical way.

They have openly shown their criticism of yellow unionism.

In 2013, the FAGC managed to relocate more than 70 people into empty buildings that belonged to banks or financial entities, following the ideas of the squatter movement and until 2016 it had managed to relocate more than 400 people on the island. The FAGC, unlike of the Stop Evictions platform, emphasizes cases of squatting, homelessness and renting.

They also deal with the dissemination of libertarian ideas through social networks and, during their early years, with a weekly radio program: Voces libertarias.

In 2018 a project emerged to give testimony in a documentary of the actions of the FAGC and the Tenant Union of Gran Canaria, under the title Precaristas: crónica de la lucha por la vivienda en Gran Canaria.

=== "La Esperanza" Community ===
The organization Comunidad "La Esperanza" was born in the municipality of Santa María de Guía, which constitutes the largest squatting project in Spain and the most ambitious project of the FAGC.

== Publications ==
- Anarchist Federation of Gran Canaria (2019). Federación de anarquistas de Gran Canaria: las ideas, los hechos. Barcelona: Col-lectiu BAUMA.

== See also ==
- Anarchism in Spain
