= Guy Aldred =

British anarchist communist

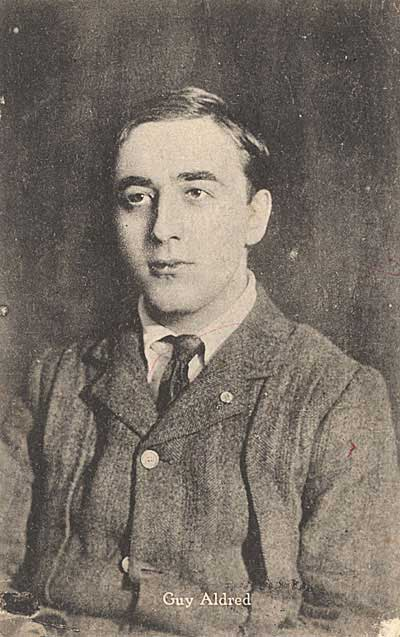
- Born: Guy Alfred Aldred; 5 November 1886; Clerkenwell, Middlesex, England, United Kingdom of Great Britain and Ireland
- Died: 16 October 1963 (aged 76); Western Infirmary, Glasgow, Scotland, United Kingdom
- Political party: SDF
- Other political affiliations: Communist League; APCF; USM
- Movement: Anarchism
- Spouse: Rose Witcop
- Partner: Jenny Patrick
- Mother: Ada Caroline Holdsworth

Guy Alfred Aldred (often Guy A. Aldred; 5 November 1886 – 16 October 1963) was a British anarcho-communist and a prominent member of the Anti-Parliamentary Communist Federation (APCF). He founded the Bakunin Press publishing house and edited five Glasgow-based anarchist periodicals: The Herald of Revolt, The Spur, The Commune, The Council, and The Word, where he worked closely with Ethel MacDonald and his later partner Jenny Patrick.

== Early life ==
Aldred was born in Clerkenwell, Middlesex. His father was a 22-year-old lieutenant in the Royal Navy, and his mother was Ada Caroline Holdsworth, a 19-year-old parasol maker. Although Ada was socially unacceptable to the young naval officer, he married her shortly before Guy's birth. After the wedding, he left her at the church to return to his mother. Guy Fawkes night, 5 November, gave Guy his forename. Guy was brought up in the home of Ada's father, Charles Holdsworth, a Victorian radical. He attended the Iron Infant's School in Farringdon Road, later moving to the Hugh Middleton Higher Grade School, where he was presented to the Prince of Wales because he was the youngest pupil. One of his fellow pupils was the son of Hermann Jung, the Swiss watchmaker and one-time activist in the First International. His first adventures in propaganda were with the Anti-Nicotine League, the Band of Hope, and the total abstinence movement, and he remained an abstainer in these respects all his life.

His grandfather, an Anglican, encouraged him to attend the church of St Anne and St Agnes, where he took communion in 1894. However, he soon developed a critical attitude to the church, even though he was close to his cousin, a curate at Holloway.

At the age of 15 (1902), he was made aware of his London provincialism when Madho Singh II, the Maharaja of Jaipur, visited the city. He became fascinated by the newspaper accounts of the Maharaja moving around with his "travelling god":

The Rajah's god was a substantial fact. It had invaded my petty little world. It had brought home to me the realities of other cities and of other religions. It had made known to me, as no mere study could have done, the fact that Christianity was not the religion of the world. It had brought home to my understanding the fact that there was an Oriental theology beyond the pale of Christian orthodoxy.

Later that year he gained a reputation as a "Boy Preacher", printing and handing out his own leaflets, which were often received with ridicule and disdain. He found employment as an office boy with the National Press Agency in Whitefriars House, where he was promoted to sub-editor. Working with an evangelist named McMasters, he co-founded the "Christian Social Mission", opening shortly after his 16th birthday as the Holloway Boy Preacher. His non-conformist approach aroused concern following his first sermon.

After contacting Charles Voysey, Guy was eventually granted an audience on 20 December 1902. The 74-year-old well-to-do Voysey was surprised to be confronted with a coarse-dressed 16-year-old working-class boy. After careful preliminaries on the part of Voysey, the meeting lasted three hours. Their friendship was to continue until Voysey's death in 1912.

In January 1903 the Reverend George Martin, an Anglican priest, visited Guy with one of his leaflets, asking to meet the Holloway Boy Preacher. Martin worked in London's worst slums, and Guy joined him in his work with London's poorest. His friendship with Martin lasted six years and influenced Guy strongly. He soon gave his last sermon from the pulpit and left the "Christian Social Mission".

== Agnosticism ==
Guy became a speaker at the Institute of Theism, but soon felt it was time to set up his own organisation. In 1904 he founded the Theistic Mission, which met every Sunday. With a considerable, though sometimes boisterous, crowd, Guy was gaining a reputation as a forceful young orator. He was also shifting towards atheism. By August, the meeting banner was changed to read The Clerkenwell Freethought Mission. Meetings often generated extreme hostility. On one occasion the crowd charged the platform, knocking Guy to the ground and beating him. Police intervention put an end to the meeting. Around this time he became interested in The Agnostic Journal and became friendly with its editor, "Saladin", a Scotsman. It was at the Journal's office that he met another Scotsman, John Morrison Davidson, and Guy became more interested in Scottish affairs.

== Indian Sedition Trial, 1907 ==
Mast head of The Indian Sociologist

The Indian Sociologist was an Indian nationalist newspaper edited by Shyamji Krishnavarma. When Krishnavarma left London for Paris, fearing repression by the authorities, the printing of the newspaper was first taken over by Arthur Fletcher Horsley. However, he was arrested and tried for printing the May, June and July issues. (He was tried and sentenced on the same day as Madan Lal Dhingra, who was convicted of the assassination of Sir William Hutt Curzon Wyllie). At Horseley's prominent trial the Lord Chief Justice, Lord Alverstone, indicated that anyone printing that sort of material would be liable for prosecution. Nevertheless, Aldred, as an advocate of the free press, published it, bearing his own name. The police obtained a warrant and seized 396 copies of the issue. At the trial the prosecution was led by the Attorney General, Sir William Robson, at the Central Criminal Court. Robson highlighted parts of TIS which Aldred had himself written, particularly focussing on a passage which touched on the execution of Dhingra:

In the execution of Dhingra that cloak will be publicly worn, that secret language spoken, that solemn veil employed to conceal the sword of Imperialism by which we are sacrificed to the insatiable idol of modern despotism, whose ministers are Cromer, Curzon and Morley & Co. Murder - which they would represent to us as a horrible crime, when the murdered is a government flunkey - we see practised by them without repugnance or remorse when the murdered is a working man, a Nationalist patriot, an Egyptian fellaheen or half-starved victim of despotic society's bloodlust. It was so at Featherstone and Denshawai; it has often been so at Newgate: and it was so with Robert Emmett, the Paris communards, and the Chicago martyrs. Who is more reprehensible than the murderers of these martyrs? The police spies who threw the bomb at Chicago; the ad-hoc tribunal which murdered innocent Egyptians at Denshawai; the Asquith who assumed full responsibility for the murder of the workers at Featherstone; the assassins of Robert Emmett? Yet these murderers have not been executed! Why then should Dhingra be executed? Because he is not a time-serving executioner, but a Nationalist patriot, who, though his ideals are not their ideals, is worthy of the admiration of those workers at home, who have as little to gain from the lick-spittle crew of Imperialistic blood-sucking, capitalist parasites at as what the Nationalists have in India.

Aldred also remarked that the Sepoy Mutiny, or Indian Mutiny, would be described as The Indian War of Independence. Aldred received a sentence of twelve months hard labour. His involvement with The Indian Sociologist brought him into contact with Har Dayal, who combined anarchism with his Indian Nationalism, based on his view of ancient Aryan culture and Buddhism.

== Socialism and anarchism ==
Aldred joined the Social Democratic Federation, but left in 1906. He was a political conscientious objector during the First World War and also a founder of the Glasgow Anarchist Group. He initiated the Communist Propaganda Groups, in support of the October Revolution, which subsequently became a component of the Communist League in 1919. Following its collapse, he founded the Anti-Parliamentary Communist Federation (APCF) in 1921, and gradually moved towards opposing the Soviet Union. His links with left communists across Europe brought him close to council communism.

In 1932 he split with the APCF and later founded the Workers Open Forum, which eventually became the United Socialist Movement. During World War II the USM worked with people from across the political spectrum to oppose military action, in a form of Popular Front, and came to advocate World Government. After Joseph Stalin's death, Aldred became increasingly supportive of the Soviet Union.

== Free love ==
Aldred worked closely with his partner Rose Witcop (9 April 1890 – 4 July 1932), a pioneer of birth control and sister of Milly Witkop (who was, in turn, partner of anarchist Rudolf Rocker).

Together they published an edition of Margaret Sanger's Family Limitation, an action which saw them denounced by a London magistrate for "indiscriminate" publication and, despite expert testimony from a consultant to Guy's Hospital and evidence at the appeal that the book had only been sold to those aged over twenty-one, the stock was ordered to be destroyed. Their case had been strongly supported by Dora Russell who, with her husband Bertrand Russell and John Maynard Keynes, paid the legal costs of the appeal.

Aldred and Witcop had a son, Annesley, in 1909. Although they were drifting apart by the time Aldred settled permanently in Glasgow in 1922, finally parting in 1924, they had a legal marriage on 2 February 1926, when it seemed possible Witcop might be deported for her continuing work on family planning.

== Death and legacy ==
After initially refusing hospital treatment for a heart condition, Aldred died, almost penniless, in the Western Infirmary, Glasgow, on 16 October 1963 aged 76, leaving his body to Glasgow University's Department of Anatomy. His remains were cremated at the Maryhill Crematorium, Glasgow on 4 May 1964.

Aldred's long-time associate and literary executor, John Taylor Caldwell, produced a biography Come Dungeons Dark: The Life and Times of Guy Aldred, Glasgow Anarchist and ensured that Aldred's work was collated and preserved on microfilm. His personal papers were deposited in the Bailie's Library, Glasgow, now held in the Mitchell Library. He was survived by his son, Annesley.

== Work ==
Some of Aldred's pamphlets can be found online as part of the Jo Labadie Collection.

- The Last Days - War of Peace?, 1902
- The Safety of Unbelief, 1904
- The Case for Anarchism, 1906
- The Possibility and Philosophy of Anarchist Communism, 1906
- Logics and Economics of the Class Struggle, 1907
- Open Letter to a Constitutional Imbecile, 1907
- The Basis and Exodus of Bourgeois Sectarianism, 1907
- Sex Oppression, 1907
- Anarchism, Socialism and Social Revolution, 1908
- From Anglican Boy-Preacher to Anarchist Socialist Impossibilist, 1908
- Representation and the State, 1910
- Trade Unionism and the Class War, 1911
- Richard Carlile: His Battle for the Free Press: How Defiance Created Government Terrorism, The Bukunin Press, 1912 (The Revolt Library, No. 2)
- Bakunin's Writings (ed), 1913
- Socialism and Marriage
- The Socialism and Anti-Parliamentarism of William Morris, 1915
- Michael Bakunin, Communist, 1920
- Communism and Religion, 1920
- Socialism and Parliament, 1924
- Socialism and Parliament Part I: The Burning Question of Today (revised edition, 1928)
- Socialism and Parliament Part II: Government by Labour, 1928
- At Grips with War, 1929
- John Maclean, 1932
- Life of Bakunin (Revised Edition), 1933
- Towards Social Revolution?: Whither the ILP?, 1934
- Socialism and the Pope, 1934
- For Communism, 1935
- Against Terrorism in the Workers' Struggle, 1938
- The Rebel and his Disciples, 1940
- Historical and Traditional Christianity 1940
- Studies in Communism, 1940
- Bakunin, 1940
- Dogmas Discarded, 1940
- Pioneers of Anti-Parliamentarianism, 1940
- Why Jesus Wept, 1940
- The Conscientious Objector, The Tribunal and After, 1940
- Communism: The Story of the Communist Party, 1943
- Convict 9653 - Eugene Debs, 1942
- A Call to Manhood: 26 Essays, 1944
- Sown in Dishonour, 1945
- Peace Now and Forever, 1945
- Rex v. Aldred - Report of Trials for Sedition, 1909 and 1912, 1948
- No Traitors' Gait! - The Life and Times of Guy A. Aldred, (Issued in 19 parts between December 1955 and June 1963), unfinished.
- Two Nations, 1963

== Bibliography ==
- Federation, Anarchist Communist (1996). "Anarchist Communism in Britain". Organise! (42). London: 11–18. OCLC 500079933. Archived from the original on 1 April 2006.
- Hayes, Mark (2005). The British Communist Left: a contribution to the history of the revolutionary movement 1914-1945. London: International Communist Current. ISBN 1897980116. OCLC 642281773. Archived from the original on 27 October 2021.
- Jones, Rob (October 1991) [1989]. "Anti-Parliamentarism and Communism in Britain, 1917-1921". Discussion Bulletin. Grand Rapids, Michigan: Industrial Union Caucus in Education. OCLC 13302352.
- Kinna, Ruth (2011). "Guy Aldred: bridging the gap between Marxism and anarchism". Journal of Political Ideologies. 16 (1). Abingdon: Routledge: 97–114. doi:10.1080/13569317.2011.540950. ISSN 1469-9613. LCCN 96660831. OCLC 707098910. S2CID 143538923.
- Meltzer, Albert (1996). "The Guy they All Dread". I Couldn't Paint Golden Angels. Edinburgh: AK Press. ISBN 9781873176931. OCLC 33948800.
- Shipway, Mark (1988). Anti Parliamentary Communism: the movement for workers' councils in Britain, 1917-45. London: Macmillan. ISBN 033343613X. OCLC 468642120.
