= Rebel Alliances =

2006 book by Benjamin Franks

- Author: Benjamin Franks
- Subject: Political theory
- Publisher: 2006 (AK Press and Dark Star)
- Pages: 475 pp.
- ISBN: 9781904859406

Rebel Alliances: The Means and Ends of Contemporary British Anarchisms is a book-length study of philosophy applied to contemporary British class-struggle anarchism. Philosopher Benjamin Franks compares this tradition with competing political groups such as autonomist Marxism and describes a consistent, "ideal" anarchism.
