= United Socialist Movement =

- Abbreviation: USM
- Leader: Guy Aldred
- Founded: July 1934
- Dissolved: 1965
- Split from: Anti-Parliamentary Communist Federation
- Headquarters: Glasgow
- Newspaper: The Word
- Ideology: Anarcho-communism; Abstentionism
- Political position: Far-left

The United Socialist Movement (USM) was an anarcho-communist political organisation based in Glasgow. Founded in 1934 after splitting from the Anti-Parliamentary Communist Federation, the USM initially aimed to unite revolutionary socialists into an anti-fascist alliance and played a role in the early discussions on the founding of a "Fourth International". During the Spanish Civil War, it shifted its policies away from unconditional anti-fascism towards a revolutionary anti-militarism, which going into World War II led the USM into attempting to form a "Socialist-Pacifist alliance" and even collaborating with some reactionary elements in their opposition to the war. After the war, left with only a small old guard of anarchists and anti-parliamentarists, the USM again shifted its focus towards abstentionism, running unsuccessfully in a number of elections before its eventual dissolution in 1965.

== History ==
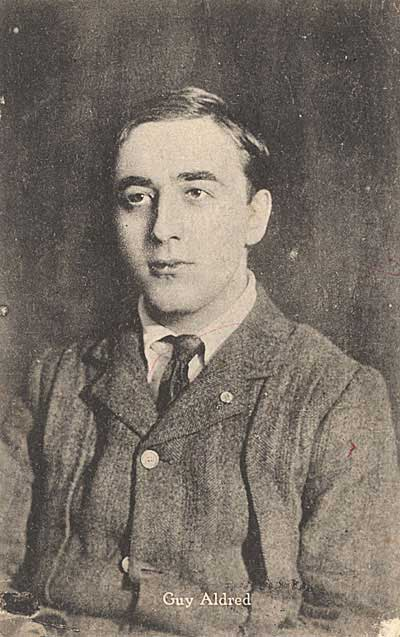
Guy Aldred, founder of the United Socialist Movement and its candidate in a number of elections.

Following a split in the Anti-Parliamentary Communist Federation, a number of its prominent members including Guy Aldred and Ethel MacDonald resigned and established the Workers' Open Forum (WOF) in August 1933. For the organisation's official organ, Aldred launched a newspaper the New Spur, published in Nimes by André Prudhommeaux. It printed a number of essays about the "Anti-Parliamentary Pioneers" Mikhail Bakunin and Errico Malatesta, defended the arson attack on the German Reichstag building by Marinus van der Lubbe, and criticised the united front policy that advocated an alliance between the Independent Labour Party (ILP) and Communist Party of Great Britain (CPGB). Himself frightened by the rise of British Fascism, in January 1934 Aldred joined the ILP, holding that the construction of a united revolutionary anti-fascist movement to be a more immediate issue than anti-parliamentarism, which he considered to be a largely defunct movement due to the increasing association of anti-parliamentary politics with fascism.

=== Foundation and conflict with the APCF ===
Despite his relegation of anti-parliamentarism, Aldred's history caused a dispute within the Glasgow Federation of the ILP, leading to his expulsion and the resignation of the Townhead branch, which in July 1934 came together with the WOF to establish the United Socialist Movement (USM). Before long the Leeds Anarchist Group had affiliated with the USM, followed by some London sections of the APCF and the former Hammersmith Socialist Society, which formed a London branch of the USM by 1938. In the context of an ongoing free speech fight in Glasgow, Aldred was nominated by the USM to stand in the local election for the Glasgow Corporation on a platform of freedom of speech and assembly, but he finished last in the polls.

Although the split from the APCF had caused less than amicable relations between it and the USM, the two attempted to reconcile throughout the 1930s in the spirit of cooperation between like-minded groups. Aldred aimed to build an "anti-parliamentary international" that would unite the APCF and USM with the remains of the Communist Workers' International (CWI), as well as the US-based Communist League of Struggle (CLS) and United Workers Party (UWP), which rejected working together. The CLS leader Vera Buch arrived in Glasgow in May 1935 to discuss with the USM the formation of a Fourth International, encouraging the USM to unite with the APCF, but relations were soon severed following her departure due to disagreements over political differences and financial arrangements. Aldred's attempts to construct this new international were stillborn, with the USM and APCF remaining largely uninfluential and continuing to feud over their small differences. Guy Aldred's central role in the USM and his tendency to "ignore organisations and work on his own initiative" was denounced by other members of the organisation, some of whom resigned in June 1935 out of frustration with his "domineering personality".

Out of a growing sense of pessimism with the revolutionary prospects in Britain, Aldred decided it was "imperative that Anti-Parliamentarism should be heard again" and in May 1936 launched the USM's new journal Attack, which only lasted a single issue. In an article he wrote for Attack, Aldred argued for the role of workers' councils in the construction of a transitional dictatorship of the proletariat, rejecting the "substitutionism" of a revolutionary vanguard taking power on the workers' behalf and warning that a party dictatorship would inevitably lead to the establishment of a new ruling class.

=== Organising around the Spanish Civil War ===
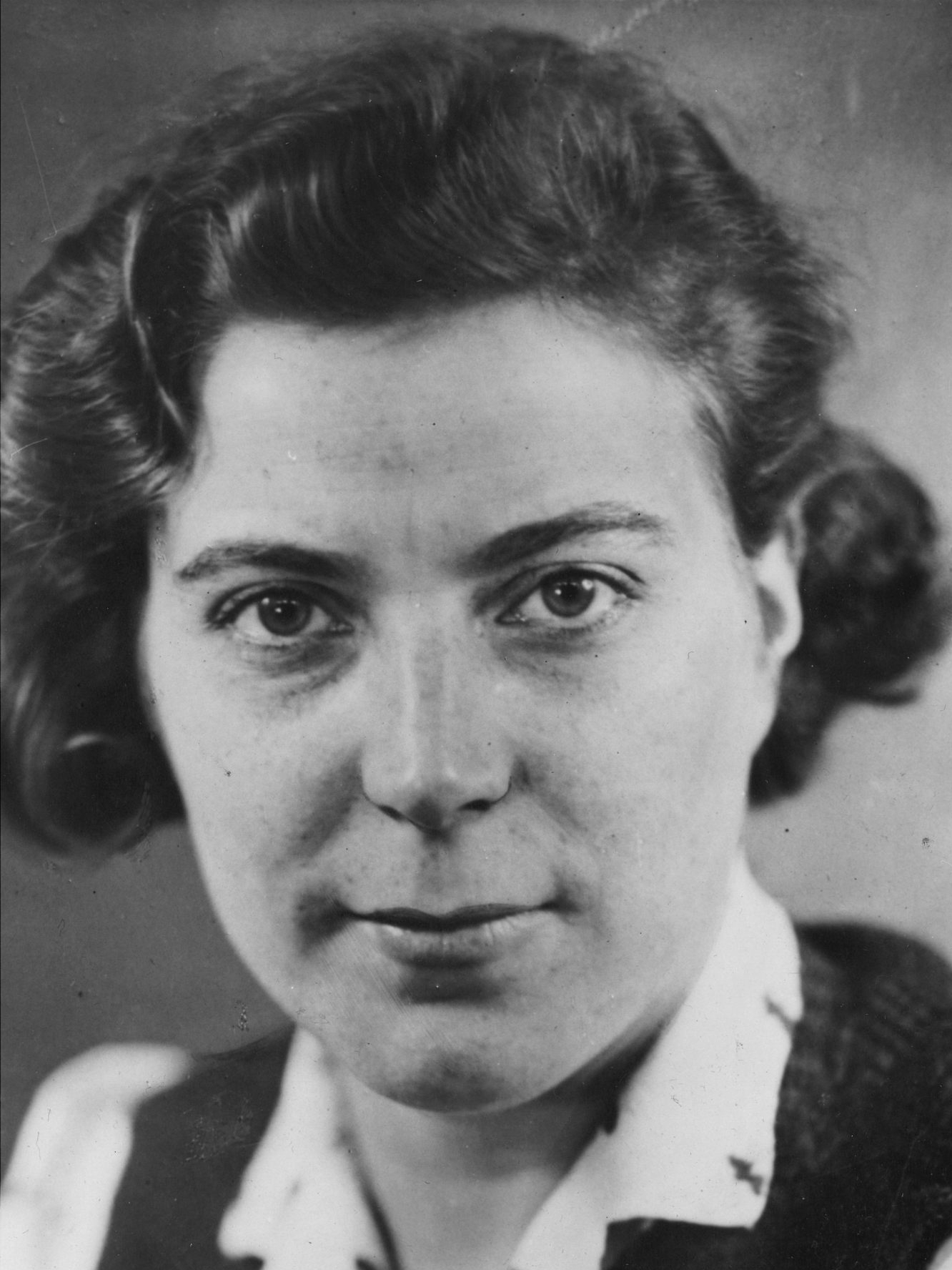
Ethel MacDonald, founder of the United Socialist Movement and its official delegate in Barcelona during the Spanish Civil War.

Following the outbreak of the Spanish Civil War, which Aldred proclaimed to be "the mighty proletarian movement that Europe needed", the USM once again saw a surge in activity. In August 1936 the USM founded the semi-weekly newspaper Regeneracion and began to hold frequent open-air meetings which, according to John Taylor Caldwell, "drew bigger crowds than at any time since the general strike". In a meeting on 11 August, the USM called on workers' organisations to convene meetings in solidarity with the Spanish Republicans and condemned Stanley Baldwin's National Government for not itself supporting the Spanish Republic. They demanded that a recall election be held, advocating for anarchists and anti-parliamentary communists to vote for any anti-fascist candidate that expressed their support for the Republic, and declared that a general strike would be held in the event that the recall didn't happen. Subsequent issues of Regeneracion reaffirmed the USM's support for the Republic, stressing the legitimacy of the Republican government in their attempts to encourage intervention from democratic nations such as Britain and France, with Aldred criticising their continued neutrality. The USM was therefore setting aside its own principles of anti-electoralism, anti-capitalism and anti-statism in order to curry support for the Spanish Republic. The USM and APCF carried their dispute through the first year of the civil war, as they both competed for recognition as the official British representative of the Confederación Nacional del Trabajo (CNT). In the USM's bid for the position, Aldred took credit for the rise of British sympathies for the Republican faction, but the role was eventually assigned to the joint Bureau that had been established by the APCF and the Freedom Group around Emma Goldman, which allowed the USM to take a more critical approach to the events in Spain.

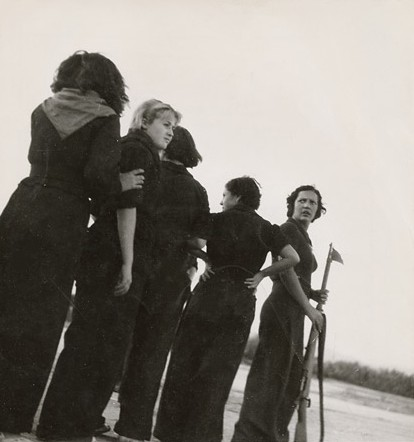
Women training for a militia outside Barcelona in August 1936.

An appeal from André Prudhommeaux for weapons, funding and soldiers to be sent to Spain was published in a September 1936 issue of Regeneracion, with Aldred organising the delegation of an "Anti-Parliamentary Column". The USM chose Ethel MacDonald to represent them in Spain and on 19 October she left Glasgow to make the trip through France to Barcelona, where she broadcast English language programs from the CNT's radio station. Reports from MacDonald that arrived back in Glasgow were in stark contrast to the USM's initial position of support for the Republican government, as she elaborated the role that the Spanish Revolution had to play in fighting back against the Nationalists, which she described as "the living demonstration of the power of the proletariat, the living truth of the force of direct action." Urged by MacDonald to emphasise workers' direct action over parliamentary inaction, by February 1937 the USM had changed its characterisation of the civil war from one of "democracy against fascism" to one of "social revolution against capitalism" and began to openly criticise the Republican government, even retroactively condemning the decision of CNT leaders including Federica Montseny to join the Republican government.

Flag of the CNT-FAI.

By this time, the USM and APCF had once again increased their contact with each other, with their relations drastically improving after the resignation of Frank Leech from the APCF in April 1937. The two collaborated in the publication of the Barcelona Bulletin, which published eye-witness accounts of the May Days that were sympathetic to the Revolutionary faction: the anarchists of the CNT-FAI and the Trotskyists of the POUM. In the wake of the repression that followed the events, Ethel MacDonald was arrested and imprisoned by the Catalan government, but after the USM and APCF co-operated in the formation of a joint committee in her defence, she was released and fled the country in September 1937, arriving back in Glasgow by November. In response to her experiences during the May Days, MacDonald stated:

Fascism is not something new, some new force of evil opposed to society, but is only the old enemy, Capitalism, under a new and fearful sounding name [...] Under the guise of 'Anti-Fascism' elements are admitted to the working class movement whose interests are still diametrically opposed to those of the workers [...] Anti-Fascism is the new slogan by which the working class is being betrayed.

In the wake of the repression in Spain and as reports emerged of the Moscow Trials, the USM began to increasingly criticise the Soviet Union. They traced the beginnings of what became the "Great Purge" to the initiation of political repression during the Russian Civil War, declaring that the Old Bolsheviks who had previously participated in the establishment of the state's repressive instruments were now on the receiving end: "those who were parties to the Kronstadt massacre, reaped what they helped to sow." In 1937, the USM, APCF and ILP participated, along with the Revolutionary Socialist Party (RSP), in the establishment of the Socialist Anti-Terror Committee (SATC), formed to denounce the Great Terror being imposed in the Soviet Union. In March 1938, the SATC published Guy Aldred's pamphlet Against Terrorism in the Workers' Struggle, in which he accused the CPGB of supporting "terrorism, imperialist opportunism, counter-revolution and political corruption", called for the destruction of Stalinist Communist Parties and carried out a comparison of Fascism and Stalinism. But soon after the pamphlet's publication, the SATC dissolved, which Aldred claimed was part of an ILP sabotage directed against him personally.

=== Anti-militarist activities during World War II ===
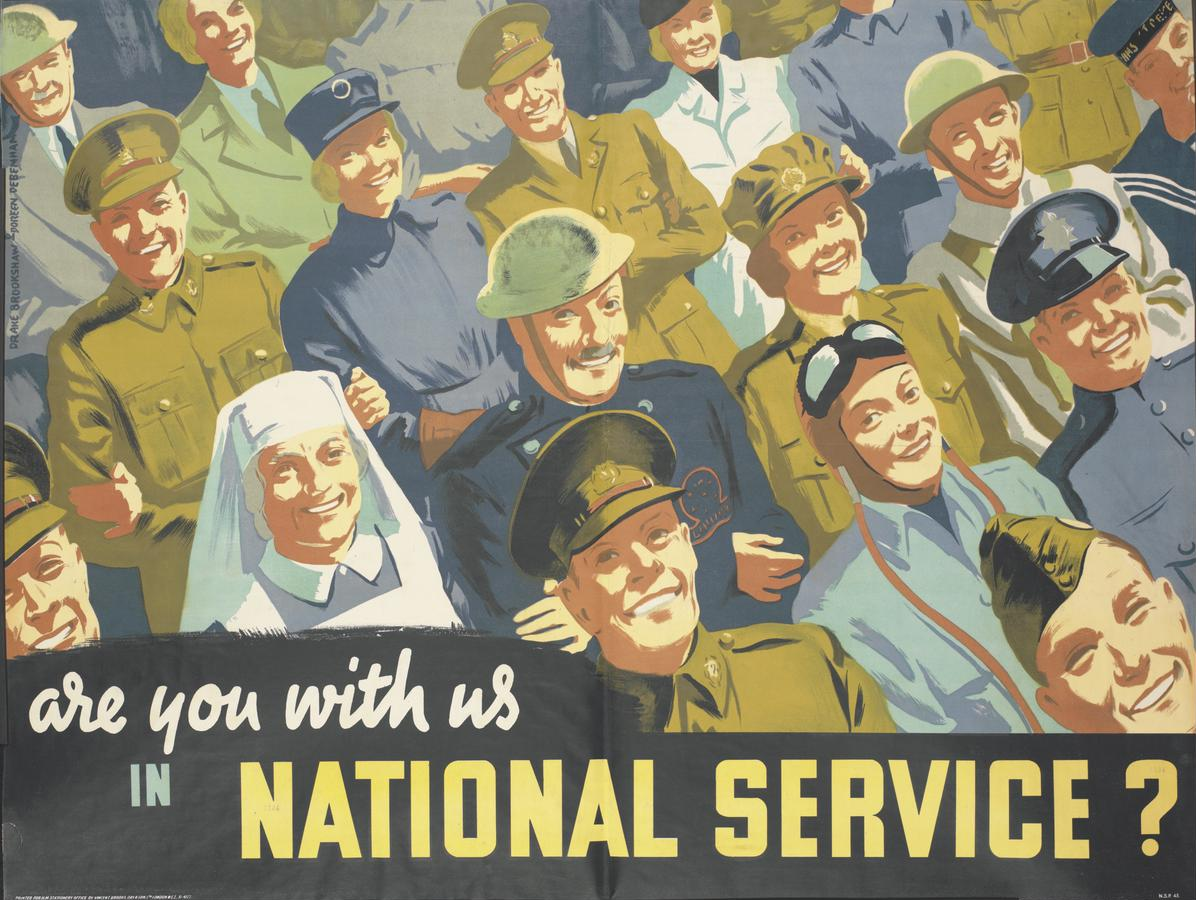
World War II propaganda poster promoting national service.

Over the following year, the USM's activity was limited to the publication of a single issue of the Word in May 1938 and another issue of Hyde Park in September 1938. But by May 1939, the end of the Spanish Civil War and the first steps towards what would become World War II sparked another surge in the USM's activities, beginning with the revival of the Word as a regular publication. Rejecting their previous support for "democracy against fascism" during the Civil War, the USM characterised the World War as one of conflict between capitalist powers and opposed the British entry, with Guy Aldred posing the question: "Why should young men go forward to fight to acquire more territory to be plundered and exploited by American millionaires? Why should they conceive American democracy to be something superior to German Fascism?" The USM also refused to differentiate between the Soviet Union and the Western Allies, holding that the USSR was a capitalist state with the same motivations for war as the other powers and again drawing comparisons between fascism and Stalinism. Following the British government's implementation of Defence Regulation 18B and the expansion of its powers in May 1940, Guy Aldred argued that the regulation had transformed the United Kingdom into a dictatorship.

The USM organised its anti-war activities through direct action against any involvement in the military apparatus, with some individual members even considering it a "matter of principle not to possess or carry a gas-mask." The USM collaborated with the APCF and Glasgow Anarchist Federation in the establishment of the No-Conscription League, with Guy Aldred serving as the organisation's chairperson, publishing a pamphlet detailing the rights of conscientious objector and even offering them legal counsel. Some members of the USM including John Taylor Caldwell and Guy Aldred's son Annesley managed to gain unconditional exemption from military service, but others were only able to gain exemption conditional on their return to their workplaces following lengthy court processes and prison sentences. The USM further attacked the CPGB for its inconsistent position on the war, highlighting its abandonment of anti-imperialist class war rhetoric in order to support the war and recalling its earlier support for the Molotov–Ribbentrop Pact.

The USM under Aldred began to propose a number of alliances during the war, organising alongside Labour Party MPs and many Christian pacifist groups, even printing a number of their articles in the Word. Aldred was particularly criticised by other members of the USM for working with the antisemitic Scottish Protestant League and the far-right aristocrat Hastings Russell, with articles by both being published in the Word. Aldred even went as far as to propose a "Socialist-Pacifist alliance" that would be led by Russell as "leader of the opposition to the present Government, and so the next Prime Minister." The increasingly heterogenous content of the Word drew marked condemnation, especially for its platforming of Russell, but Aldred defended the newspaper's turn under the grounds of free speech and declared the Word open "to all Pacifist and all Socialist opinion."

=== Post-war decline ===
In line with the revolutionary wave that followed World War I, Guy Aldred had predicted that "demobilisation and other difficulties would bring about a crisis: for the war represented a breakdown of Capitalist Democracy and faced it with Revolution," but the end of World War II did not produce these same results. After the Allied victory in Europe was proclaimed, a general election was called, in which Aldred ran as the USM candidate for Glasgow Central on an anti-militarist, anti-authoritarian and abstentionist platform. Influenced by Hastings Russell, Aldred also advocated for the adoption of a social credit system, in a departure from orthodox communism. But like his other election runs, Aldred finished at the bottom of the polls with only 300 votes, defeated by the Unionist candidate James Hutchison, who won 9,365 votes. The Word continued to be published by the USM's old guard around Aldred, who stood again in the 1950 and 1951 general elections, both times finishing in last place, collecting 485 votes and 411 votes respectively. Aldred died in October 1963, leaving behind an already waning United Socialist Movement, which finally ceased its activities in 1965.

== Bibliography ==
- Hayes, Mark (2005). The British Communist Left: a contribution to the history of the revolutionary movement 1914-1945. London: International Communist Current. ISBN 1897980116. OCLC 642281773. Archived from the original on 27 October 2021.
- Shipway, Mark (1988). Anti Parliamentary Communism: the movement for workers' councils in Britain, 1917-45. London: Macmillan. ISBN 033343613X. OCLC 468642120 – via AF-North.
- Barberis, Peter; McHugh, John; Tyldesley, Mike; Pendry, Helen (2001) [2000]. Encyclopedia of British and Irish Political Organizations. London: Pinter. ISBN 0826458149. OCLC 612085150.
- Gray, Daniel (2013). Homage to Caledonia: Scotland and the Spanish Civil War. New York: Luath Press. ISBN 978-1909912120. OCLC 854521251..
