= Anarchist Federation (Britain) =

Anarchist federation in Great Britain

- Abbreviation: AF, AFed
- Leader: Collective leadership
- Founded: 1986
- Merger of: Anarchist Communist Discussion Group; Syndicalist Fight
- Newspaper: Organise!
- Ideology: Anarcho-communism; Platformism
- Political position: Far-left
- International affiliation: International of Anarchist Federations

Website
- afed.org.uk

The Anarchist Federation (AF, AFed) is a federation of anarcho-communists in Great Britain. It is not a political party, but a direct action, agitational and propaganda organisation.

== History ==
The British anarchist movement had been revitalized during the time of the miners' strike of 1984–1985, which had drawn many new people to anarchism and caused a number of anarchist organizations to spring up in the wake of Class War. In 1984, a number of former members of the Libertarian Communist Group established the Libertarian Communist Discussion Group (LCDG), drawing inspiration from texts such as the Platform by Nestor Makhno and the Manifesto of Libertarian Communism by Georges Fontenis. The LCDG then began to collaborate with the editor of Virus magazine and started publishing their own texts about anarcho-communism, changing their name again to the Anarchist Communist Discussion Group (ACDG). After the split of Syndicalist Fight (SyF) from the Direct Action Movement (DAM) in 1986, the ACDG merged together with SyF and established the Anarchist Communist Federation (ACF).

Throughout the late-1980s, the ACF drew together many people that were new to anarchism, which effectively made it into an entirely new organization, almost completely disconnected from its roots. At the beginning of the 1990s, they participated in the poll tax riots, calling for "the abolition of all hierarchy" and "the creation of a worldwide classless society". According to a 1991 report by the Economic League an anti-socialist blacklisting group, the ACF had quickly become "second only to Class War" in terms of its "militancy and commitment to violence". Although a small organization, much of the ACF's influence came from its "cordial relationships" with other libertarian socialist groups, cooperating particularly closely with the autonomous Marxists of Subversion. In 1999, the ACF changed its name one final time, becoming the Anarchist Federation (AF). According to an interview with founding members of the AF, this was in order to shorten the name and to clarify that it was not an alliance of anarchists with other forms of communists.

By the turn of the 21st century, the AF were involved in the anti-globalization movement and participated in protests against rising third world debt. The Special Branch of the Metropolitan Police began investigating the AF, following 2000's May Day demonstration at Parliament Square, during which some activists had dug up the grass to plant vegetables. In 2014, following a series of acts of vandalism and arson by green anarchists, a large police investigation was launched into Bristol's anarchist community, to which the Bristol Anarchist Federation responded with a statement denouncing the police's "concerted effort to intimidate and divide" local anarchists. In 2018, a "class struggle" anarchist faction within the AF split to form the Anarchist Communist Group (ACG) due to alleged support of "identity politics" within the AF. In February 2020, eco-socialist activists connected to the Anarchist Federation took part in the occupation of Paddington Green Police Station, but they were swiftly evicted.

== Publications ==
The Anarchist Federation and its predecessors were responsible for publishing Virus magazine between 1984 and 1989, which ran for 13 issues before being replaced with a new magazine, Organise!, which has been published ever since.

== Ideology ==
The Anarchist Federation propagates a theory of anarchist communism, distancing itself from individualist anarchism, anarcho-pacifism and anarcho-syndicalism. It had come to outright reject trade unionism during the suppression of the miners' strike of 1984–1985, which had caused it to question the role of the trade unions in a class conflict. It extends its skepticism of trade unions to any permanent workplace organizations, arguing they can become integrated into the functioning of capitalism.

The AF advocates for prefigurative politics, out of a belief in a "strong correlation between means and ends", which rejects all politicians and political parties. It considers participation in representative democracy to be "ceding political power to someone or some party", and thus favors direct action over electoralism. It further claims that Members of Parliament inevitably become corrupted by power and distant from their own communities.

== Bibliography ==
- Cross, Rich (2014). "British anarchism in the era of Thatcherism". In Smith, Evan; Worley, Matthew (eds.). Against the Grain: The British far left from 1956. Manchester: Manchester University Press. ISBN 9780719095900. OCLC 941255608.
- Franks, Benjamin (2006). Rebel Alliances: The Means and Ends of Contemporary British Anarchisms. Edinburgh: AK Press. ISBN 1904859402. OCLC 607401812.
- Marshall, Peter H. (1993). "Britain". Demanding the Impossible: A History of Anarchism. London: Fontana Press. pp. 487–495. ISBN 978-0-00-686245-1. OCLC 1042028128.
