= Anarchism in the United Kingdom =

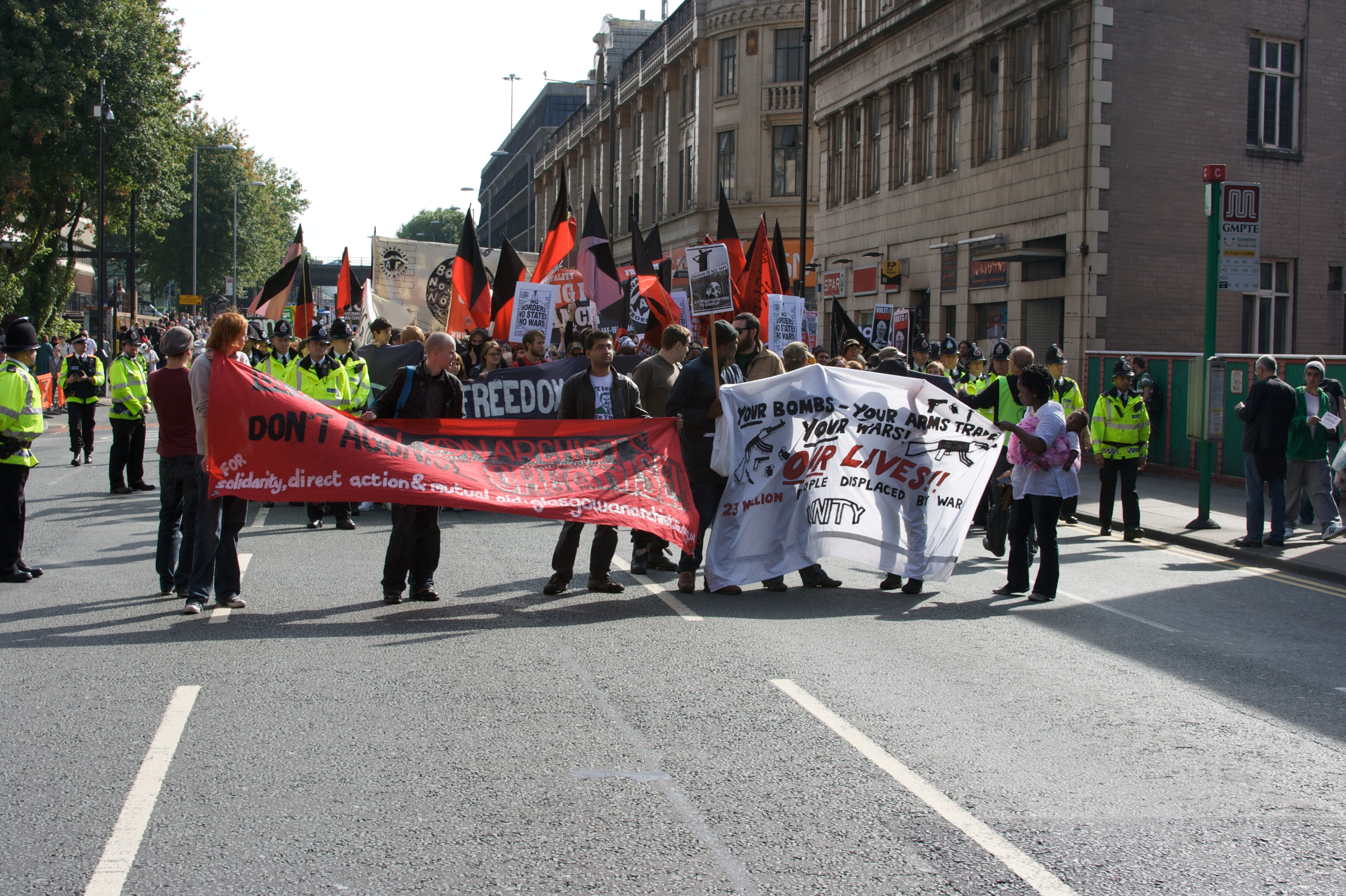
British anarchists in Manchester in September 2008

Anarchism in the United Kingdom initially developed within the religious dissent movement that began after the Protestant Reformation. Anarchism was first seen among the radical republican elements of the English Civil War and following the Stuart Restoration grew within the fringes of radical Whiggery. The Whig politician Edmund Burke was the first to expound anarchist ideas, which developed as a tendency that influenced the political philosophy of William Godwin, who became the first modern proponent of anarchism with the release of his 1793 book Enquiry Concerning Political Justice.

The development of socialism from radicalism started in the 1860s with the establishment of the International Workingmen's Association (IWA), and saw the foundation of a number of workers' societies demanding radical reform and civil liberties. By the 1870s, anarchism had been introduced to the country from Europe and America and the establishment of the Labour Emancipation League (LEL) in 1881 marked the beginning of the organized anarchist movement in the United Kingdom. The LEL was instrumental in the foundation of the Socialist League, which in 1888 came under the control of the anarchist Frank Kitz.

The Socialist League's newspaper Commonweal and Peter Kropotkin's newspaper Freedom saw anarchism through the turn of the 20th century. Anarcho-communism became a major tendency during the Revolutions of 1917–1923, when the Glasgow anarchist Guy Aldred established the Anti-Parliamentary Communist Federation and later the United Socialist Movement. The rise of anarcho-syndicalism after the Spanish Civil War eventually resulted in the foundation of the Solidarity Federation in 1950, followed by resurgence of anarcho-communism during the 1980s, when the Class War and Anarchist Federation were founded.

== History ==
The historian Peter Marshall traced the roots of British anarchism back to the Peasants' Revolt of 1381, during which yeomans rose up against the Bad Parliament's poll tax, fearing it to be an attempt by the nobility to force the yeomanry into serfdom. The peasants were further agitated by the preaching of the radical priest John Ball, who conceived of the Garden of Eden as a state of nature where class stratification did not yet exist, attacked the institutions of private property and social inequality, and called for everything to be brought under common ownership and the creation of a classless society. With Wat Tyler elected as their captain, 100,000 peasant rebels marched from Essex to London, where they were joined by the local population. Although Richard II had promised them that he would free the villeins, the rebels demolished the Savoy Palace, released all the local prisoners and executed Simon Sudbury, the Archbishop of Canterbury. Now that the rebels had captured the capital, they issued their demands, which included the introduction of wage labour, the cessation of feudal duties and the establishment of a free market. The King agreed to most of their demands in his meetings with the rebel leaders, during which Tyler called for the total abolition of serfdom and the expansion of liberty and social equality, while his more radical lieutenant Jack Straw allegedly declared that the noble and clerical classes would need to be exterminated. However, the rebel's demands would never be met as William Walworth, the Lord Mayor of London, assassinated Tyler and Straw. The King then revoked his promises and the revolt was definitively crushed. But John Ball's radical egalitarian philosophy lived on through the centuries, most notably being re-invoked in 1888 by William Morris, in his novel A Dream of John Ball.

=== The English Revolution ===
Throughout the Middle Ages, the institution of feudalism had constructed a rigidly hierarchical society, where the interests of the individual were subordinated to the divine right of kings. But following the Renaissance and Reformation, the individual first began to be considered as an autonomous entity with rights of their own. It was during the English Revolution that individual rights took their place alongside the old demands for liberty and social equality, leading to the development of recognizable anarchist tendencies. By the 16th century, the word "anarchy" was primarily associated with disorder and lawlessness, while the label of "anarchist" was pejoratively applied to anyone that upset the established order or refused to recognize the ruling power.

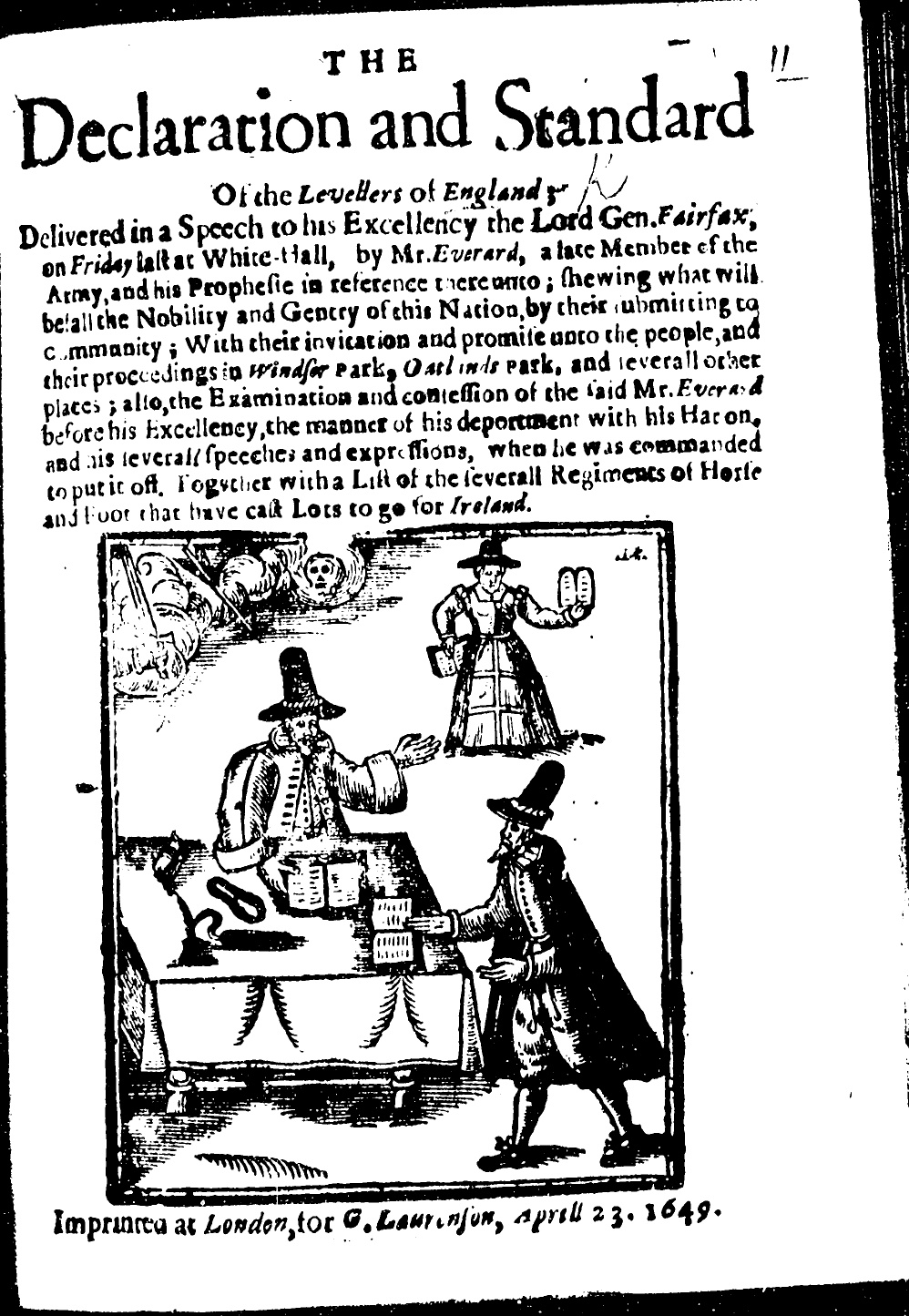
The Declaration and Standard of the Levellers of England.

In the lead up to the English Civil War, radical republican and democratic ideas were first starting to circulate, advocating the abolition of existing institutions such as the monarchy, church and feudalism. In December 1640, 15,000 Londoners presented Parliament with the "Root and Branch petition", advocating for the abolition of the episcopacy, a proposition which was denounced as "absolute Anarchism" by the royalist MP Edward Dering. When the Bill itself failed to pass, anti-clerical riots erupted in London, eventually forcing Charles I to flee the capital, along with royalist MPs and bishops, which allowed parliament the means to pass anti-clerical bills into law.

The tensions exacerbated by this situation eventually erupted into the First English Civil War, in which Parliamentarians and Covenanters were victorious over the royalist forces. Following the conflict, a radical group known as the Levellers released a series of manifestos regarding the creation of a new constitution, which became subject to debate among the parliamentary forces, as the Levellers advocated for a number of issues including progressive taxation, universal manhood suffrage and equality before the law. The radical democratic theses of the Levellers was rejected by Oliver Cromwell, who accused them of advocating the cantonalist practices of the Swiss Confederacy and declared that such policies would inevitably lead to "anarchy". But the Levellers denied the charge, as they still believed in a form of "good government".

Following the Parliamentarian victory in the Second English Civil War, the removal of dissenting voices from the House of Commons and the execution of Charles I, power lay entirely in the hands of the Grandees of the New Model Army. Unwilling to implement the radical policies advanced by the Levellers, the Grandees instead turned towards mysticism and the implementation of a Puritan religious order. But this new environment of Christian mysticism branched out into a variety of anti-authoritarian strains, with a number of English Dissenters separating entirely from the Church of England. These religious dissenters included the Quakers, Ranters, Anabaptists, Familists and Diggers. Notably, the Ranters and Diggers have been labelled as "anarchists" by historians, due to their radical egalitarian philosophies and communist practices. The Diggers believed in creating an egalitarian society of small agrarian communities and put this into practice by occupying a number of tracts of common land for the purposes of farming it, but these settlements were eventually suppressed by the authorities of the Commonwealth.

By 1653, Parliament had been forcibly dissolved by the New Model Army and the republican Commonwealth was replaced by a military dictatorship known as The Protectorate, with Oliver Cromwell acting as Lord Protector. After Cromwell's death, Parliament was reconvened and held a Convention, which instituted the restoration of the monarchy. Within decades the Stuart-ruled kingdoms of England and Scotland were united into the Kingdom of Great Britain and the British Empire was formally established. The eventual spread of the Age of Enlightenment to Britain and the outbreak of the Industrial Revolution brought about a number of changes to the country, which allowed for the early conception of a formalized anarchist philosophy.

=== The British Enlightenment ===
In 1688, the Glorious Revolution definitively established a constitutional monarchy with parliamentary supremacy in Britain. The Revolution was most notably defended by John Locke, whose justifications for democratic governance laid the foundations for classical liberalism. According to Locke, while the "state of nature" represented a state of total liberty and social equality, competition between individuals had caused instability, which made the establishment of a government to protect "life, liberty and property" a necessity. This led Locke to propose the formation of a social contract between the British people and their government, which would have the power make laws and protect the institution of private property. The Lockean proviso soon came to represent a progression from the traditionalist conservatism of the established landed gentry (later known as Tories) to the propertarianism of the emerging middle classes (later known as Whigs). By the turn of the 18th-century, Lockean liberalism started to give way to libertarianism, which centered the individual freedom of citizens within the new constitutional monarchy.

Jonathan Swift, although a conservative and misanthrope, became an early champion of Enlightenment ideals and an opponent of British rule in Ireland. In his 1726 novel Gulliver's Travels, Swift satirised the prevailing social mores of his day, railing against social inequality and the Protestant work ethic, among other subjects. In Book IV, Swift writes of the Houyhnhnms, an intelligent race of horses that believed society could govern itself sufficiently through reason and lived in a kind of primitive communism. Their only form of central government was a representative body, which met once every four years to coordinate resource distribution and existed only in an advisory capacity, having no authority to compel obedience. Swift's vision of a stateless society later inspired William Godwin's anarchist philosophy, although it would also later be criticized as "totalitarian" by George Orwell, who referred to Swift as a "Tory anarchist".

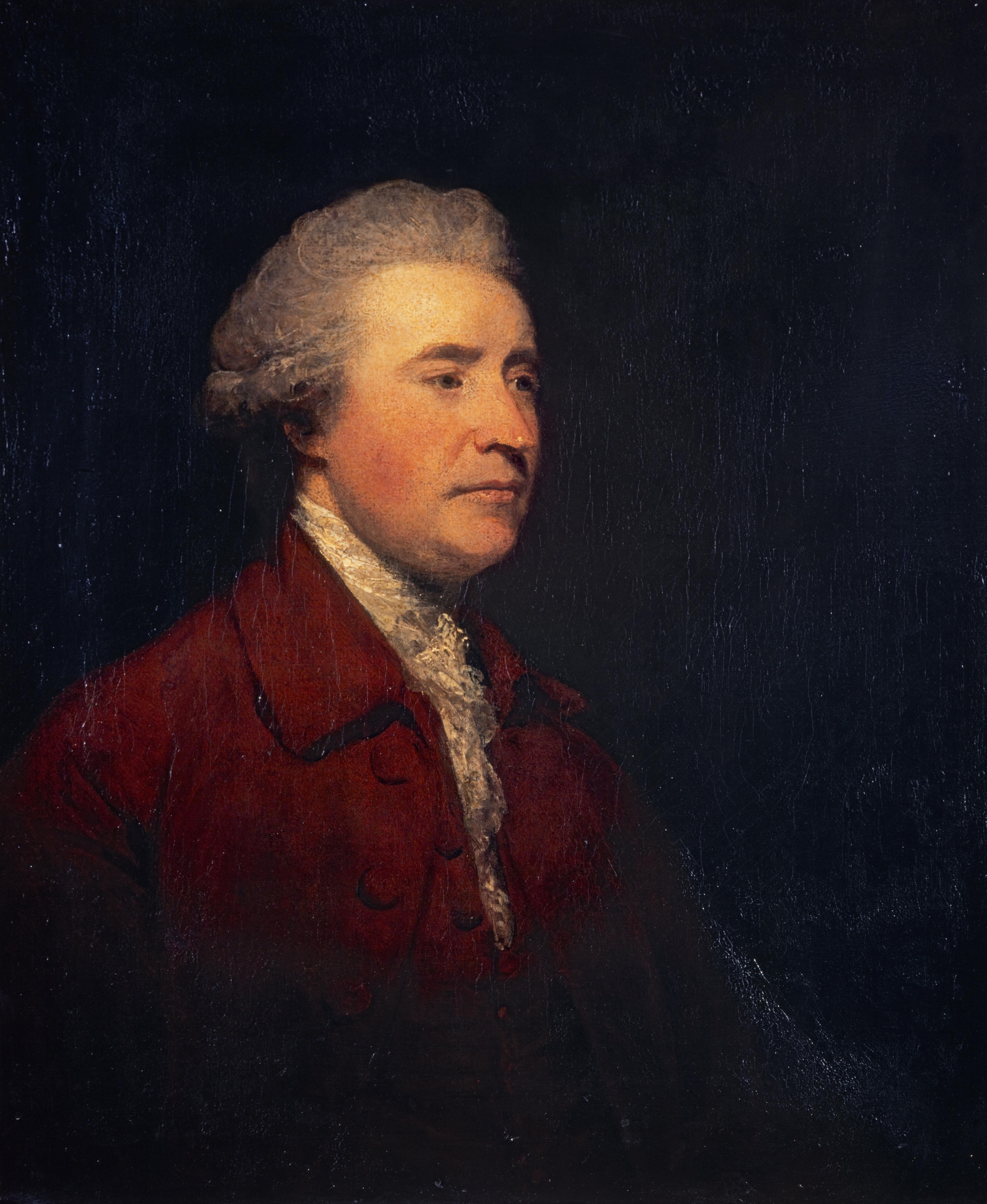
Edmund Burke, a Radical Whig politician that wrote A Vindication of Natural Society, an early literary expression of philosophical anarchism. Following the French Revolution, his political perspective shifted and he became a leading proponent of conservative liberalism and traditionalist conservatism.

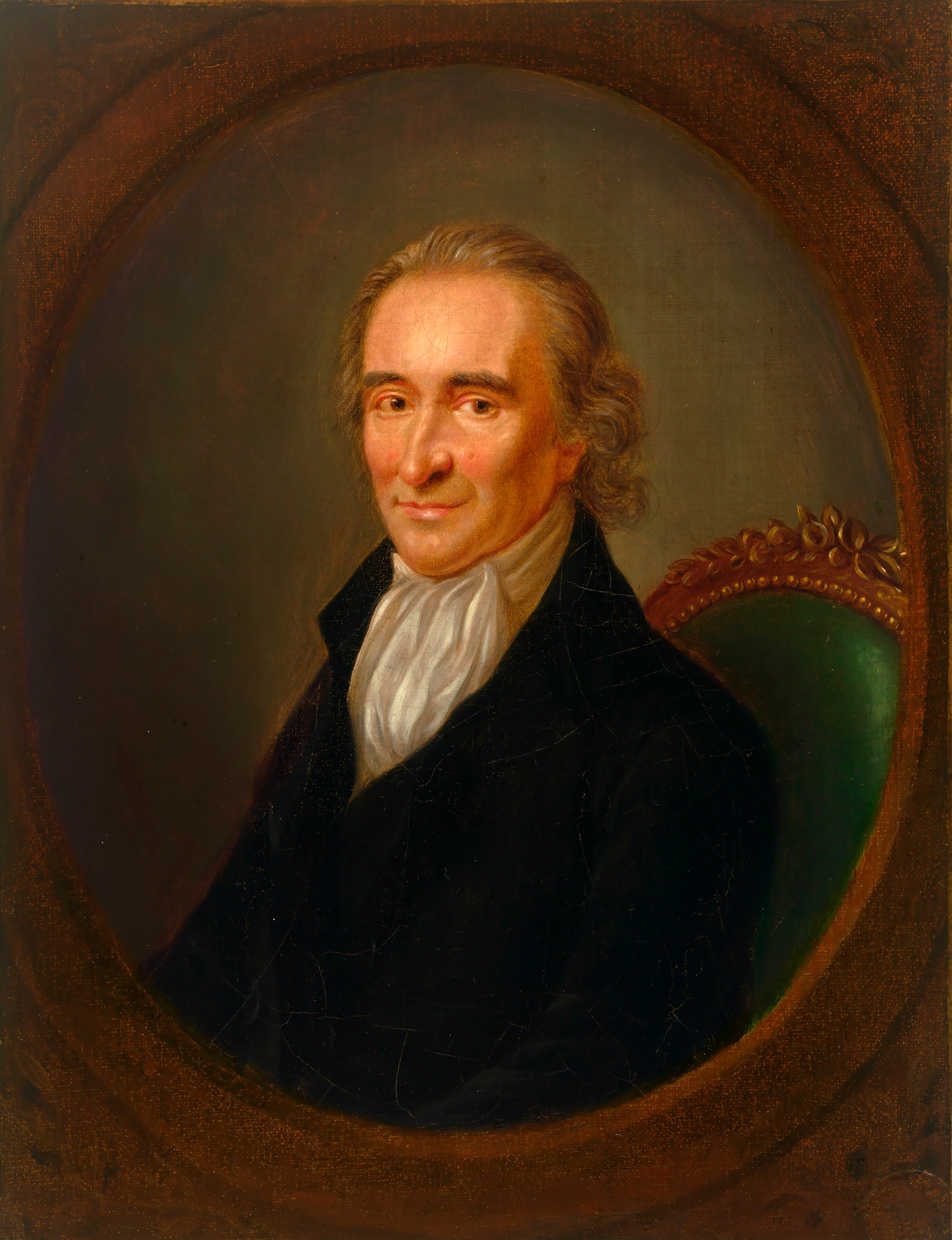
Thomas Paine, whose revolutionary works Common Sense and Rights of Man laid the groundwork for the development of modern libertarianism.

In 1756, Edmund Burke espoused a defense of the "state of nature" in A Vindication of Natural Society, painting a picture of human society being governed by reason until the invention of the state and the episcopacy, in what the historian Peter Marshall described as "one of the most powerful arguments for anarchist society made in the eighteenth century." Burke denounced the state as the sole reason for all social conflict and war, arguing that the division of humanity into different nationalities had created bigotry and that the social stratification of society had concentrated wealth in the hands of those that didn't work for it. When looking at the dominant forms of government, Burke found democracy to be more preferable to despotism and aristocracy, but still considered it lacking, calling for a complete rejection of church and state, and the reclamation of "perfect liberty". Burke would later turn towards conservatism and disown his Vindication, claiming it to be a satire of the parliamentary opposition leader Henry St John, but the text still went on to inspire the anarchist philosophy of William Godwin and the libertarian socialism of George Holyoake.

With the outbreak of the American Revolution, one thinker that rose to prominence was the radical Thomas Paine, who issued calls for women's rights, the abolition of slavery and the prevention of cruelty to animals. In 1776, Paine's pamphlet Common Sense drew considerable attention, with its calls for independence of the Thirteen Colonies and a people's war against the British Empire, in the hope that America could inspire future revolutions abroad. Inspired by the spontaneous order that had emerged following the colonial government's dissolution, Paine clearly elaborated a distinction between society and the state, declaring that "society in every state is a blessing, but government even in its best state is but a necessary evil; in its worse state an intolerable one." Nevertheless, Paine still believed in the establishment of a limited government through a social contract, with a written constitution guaranteeing the rights to "Life, Liberty and the pursuit of Happiness". The end of the American Revolutionary War was followed soon after by the beginning of the French Revolution, with Paine transplanting his revolutionary politics to Europe.

The publication of Edmund Burke's Reflections on the Revolution in France ignited a fierce pamphlet war in Britain, which became known as the "Revolution Controversy". In this work, Burke espoused a traditionalist conservative view of government, cautioning against radical changes to its functioning, which he believed would transfer power from the clergy and nobility to the "swinish multitude." The Radicals, many of whom had themselves been inspired by Burke's earlier writings, quickly took to the debate. One of the first responses came from the feminist Mary Wollstonecraft, whose Vindication of the Rights of Men and subsequent Vindication of the Rights of Woman attacked class stratification, economic inequality and gender inequality, calling for a reformed government to protect natural rights. Thomas Paine himself followed up on Wollstonecraft's treatises with his own Rights of Man, which according to Peter Marshall displayed a "libertarian sensibility [that] took him to the borders of anarchism."

Paine took the side of the "swinish multitude" and criticised Burke for subordinating individual rights to the "authority of the dead", adapting Lockean liberalism in the direction of libertarianism and direct democracy. To protect people's natural rights, he again recommended the establishment of a limited government, which would itself have no authority and would be entirely subjected to the people's authority, in order to ensure "the good of all". In Part II of his pamphlet, Paine approached anarchism with his declaration that societal order would prevail even if all government were abolished, claiming that civil society "performs for itself almost everything which is ascribed to government." He asserted that all order stemmed from human nature, itself fundamentally good but corrupted by established governments, and that individuals were chiefly regulated by their own common interest, rather than by legal codes. Drawing from British history, Paine concluded by calling for the establishment of a self-governing society, declaring that "the instant formal government is abolished, society begins to act. A general association takes place, and common interest produces common security." He therefore considered the ideal form of government to be a limited one, solely in place to secure the natural rights of individual people, looking to the nascent federal government of the United States as an example. Despite his libertarian inclinations, it was his advocacy of constitutionalism, republicanism and propertarianism that would ultimately separate Paine from modern anarchism.

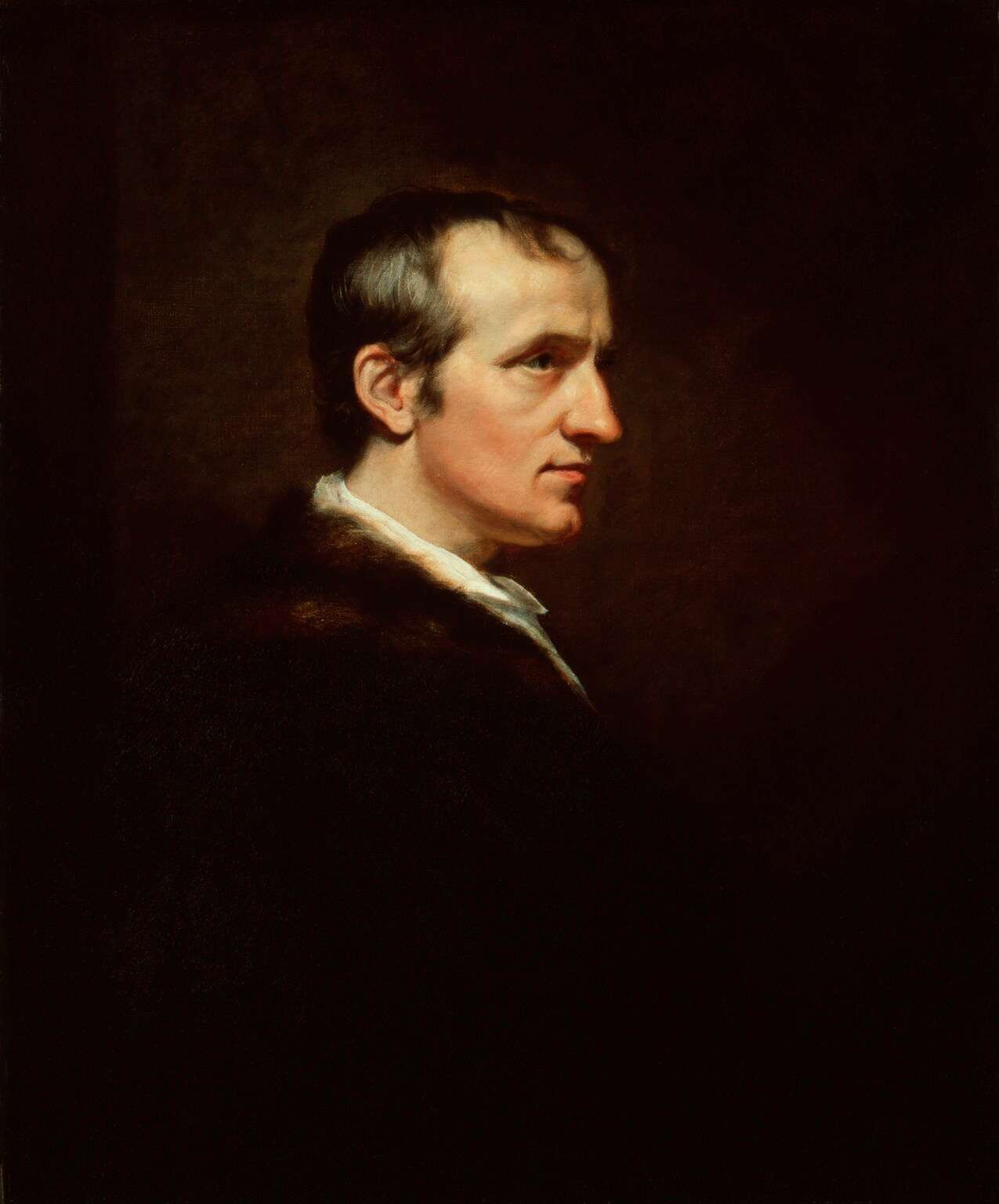
William Godwin, the first modern exponent of philosophical anarchism in his Enquiry Concerning Political Justice (1793).

It was during the Revolution Controversy that William Godwin published his Enquiry Concerning Political Justice, which became the first clear expression of philosophical anarchism, with his declaration that all government ought to be abolished. Although the book was rather expensive on release, with the prime minister William Pitt even deciding against banning the book due to its high price, many British workers threw their money together to purchase a copy by subscription, pirated copies were distributed throughout Ireland and Scotland, and Godwin ended up reducing the price. When Pitt's government began to carry out the political persecutions against the British radical movement, Godwin was among those that came to the defense of the Radicals on trial, eventually securing their release. Although alienated by the defeat of the French Revolution, Godwin's influence extended on to the next generation of Radicals. His son-in-law Percy Bysshe Shelley became a widely renowned poet, putting much of Godwin's anarchist philosophy into verse, while his disciple Robert Owen went on to become the founding father of British socialism. Following his death, Political Justice continued to inspire the Chartists and Owenites, who published new editions of the book, as well as the Ricardian socialism of Thomas Hodgskin and William Thompson, which in turn influenced the Marxist theory of the "withering away of the state".

But by the turn of the 19th century, British radicals still had not adopted the term "anarchist" as their own. Even Godwin associated the word "anarchy" with disorder, although he still considered it preferable to despotism, due to its resemblance to "true liberty". Nevertheless, followers of Godwin's political philosophy found themselves being labelled as "anarchists", most notably by the Tory statesman George Canning, who denounced William Godwin, Thomas Paine and the reformer John Thelwall as anarchists in the Anti-Jacobin Review.

=== 19th century ===
The labour movement first began to take form in Britain during the early 19th century. Spearheaded by the utopian socialist Robert Owen, himself a disciple of William Godwin, the Grand National Consolidated Trades Union contributed to the early development of syndicalism in the country, while the noncomformist priest William Benbow popularized the idea of the general strike as a means for social revolution. However, the rise of the Chartists instilled the British labour movement with a largely reformist character, concerning itself mostly with parliamentary politics.

It was the arrival of migrant workers and asylum seekers in London that introduced classical anarchism to Britain, in the wake of the Revolutions of 1848. Over the decades, isolated individuals slowly began to cluster together in political clubs, such as the Rose Street Club in Soho. This process was accelerated when Johann Most moved to London and began printing his newspaper Freiheit, which before long was shut down and forced to move its operations to the United States, after friends of Most signalled their approval of the Phoenix Park Murders.

By 1881, the movement of British revolutionary socialists towards anarchism culminated with the establishment of the Labour Emancipation League (LEL). The LEL quickly gained support for its libertarian socialist platform from the workers of London's East End, declaring themselves against all forms of government, before they merged into the Social Democratic Federation (SDF). But the authoritarianism of the SDF's leader Henry Hyndman caused a split within the organization, resulting in the formation of the Socialist League (SL) by a number of libertarian socialists around William Morris. Though himself a staunch anti-parliamentarian, Morris would end up leaving the SL following the rise of its anarchist faction in 1887, leading to a marked radicalization of the League's publications under H. B. Samuels.

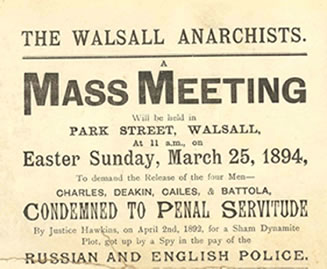
Poster advertising a meeting in support of the Walsall Anarchists

Other anarchist tendencies also began to emerge around this time, including: individualist anarchism, which was developed by Henry Seymour in his publication The Anarchist; anarcho-communism, which was propagated by Peter Kropotkin through his newspaper Freedom; and Jewish anarchism, which congregated around the Yiddish language journal Arbeter Fraynd. Anarchist tendencies also worked their way into the popular literature of the time, with William Morris' News from Nowhere depicting a utopian society and Oscar Wilde's The Soul of Man Under Socialism espousing the importance of individualism, while libertarian ideas were likewise defended by authors such as George Bernard Shaw, Edward Carpenter and Henry Stephens Salt.

=== Early twentieth century: syndicalism ===
In the 1910s, Tom Mann's Industrial Syndicalist Education League attempted to encourage the establishment of industrial unions in Britain, advocating for direct class conflict with the goal of workers' control. But the influence of anarcho-syndicalism waned in the wake of World War I, which caused a split within the anarchist movement. Although anarcho-communists like Guy Aldred attempted to keep the movement alive, by the mid-1920s, the British anarchist movement had almost dissolved, with only a few anarchist groups remaining in urban centers.

The outbreak of the Spanish Civil War brought with it a revival of the British anarchist movement, which cultivated a new generation of anarchists by the subsequent outbreak of World War II. During the Spanish Civil War, many British anarchists moved towards anarcho-syndicalism and formed syndicalist organisations to support the Spanish National Confederation of Labour (CNT). After the defeat of the Spanish anarchists in the war, the British anarchist movement attempted to reorganise itself, culminating in the establishment of the Anarchist Federation of Britain (AFB), which included anarchists of various different tendencies.

=== Post-war era ===
When Vernon Richards and three other editors were arrested at the beginning of 1945 for attempting "to undermine the affections of members of His Majesty's Forces.", Benjamin Britten, E. M. Forster, Augustus John, George Orwell, Herbert Read (chairman), Osbert Sitwell and George Woodcock set up the Freedom Defence Committee to "uphold the essential liberty of individuals and organizations, and to defend those who are persecuted for exercising their rights to freedom of speech, writing and action." The Syndicalist Workers' Federation was a syndicalist group active in post-war Britain, and one of the Solidarity Federation's earliest predecessors. It was formed in 1950 by members of the dissolved Anarchist Federation of Britain (AFB). Unlike the AFB, which was influenced by anarcho-syndicalist ideas but ultimately not syndicalist itself, the SWF decided to pursue a more definitely syndicalist, worker-centred strategy from the outset. The group joined the International Workers' Association and during the Franco era gave particular support to the Spanish resistance and the underground CNT anarcho-syndicalist union, previously involved in the 1936 Spanish Revolution and subsequent Civil War against a right-wing military coup backed by both Nazi Germany and Fascist Italy. The SWF initially had some success, but when Tom Brown, a long-term and very active member was forced out of activity, it declined until by 1979 it had only one lone branch in Manchester. The SWF then dissolved itself into the group founded as the Direct Action Movement. Its archives are held by the International Institute of Social History, and a selection of the SWFs publications have been digitally published at libcom.org.

Colin Ward was an editor of the British anarchist newspaper Freedom from 1947 to 1960, and founder/editor of the monthly anarchist journal Anarchy from 1961 until it ceased publication in 1970. There were 118 issues. It is not to be confused with the subsequent, shorter-lived magazine of the same name, sometimes referred to as Anarchy (Second Series), which was edited/published by a quite separate group.

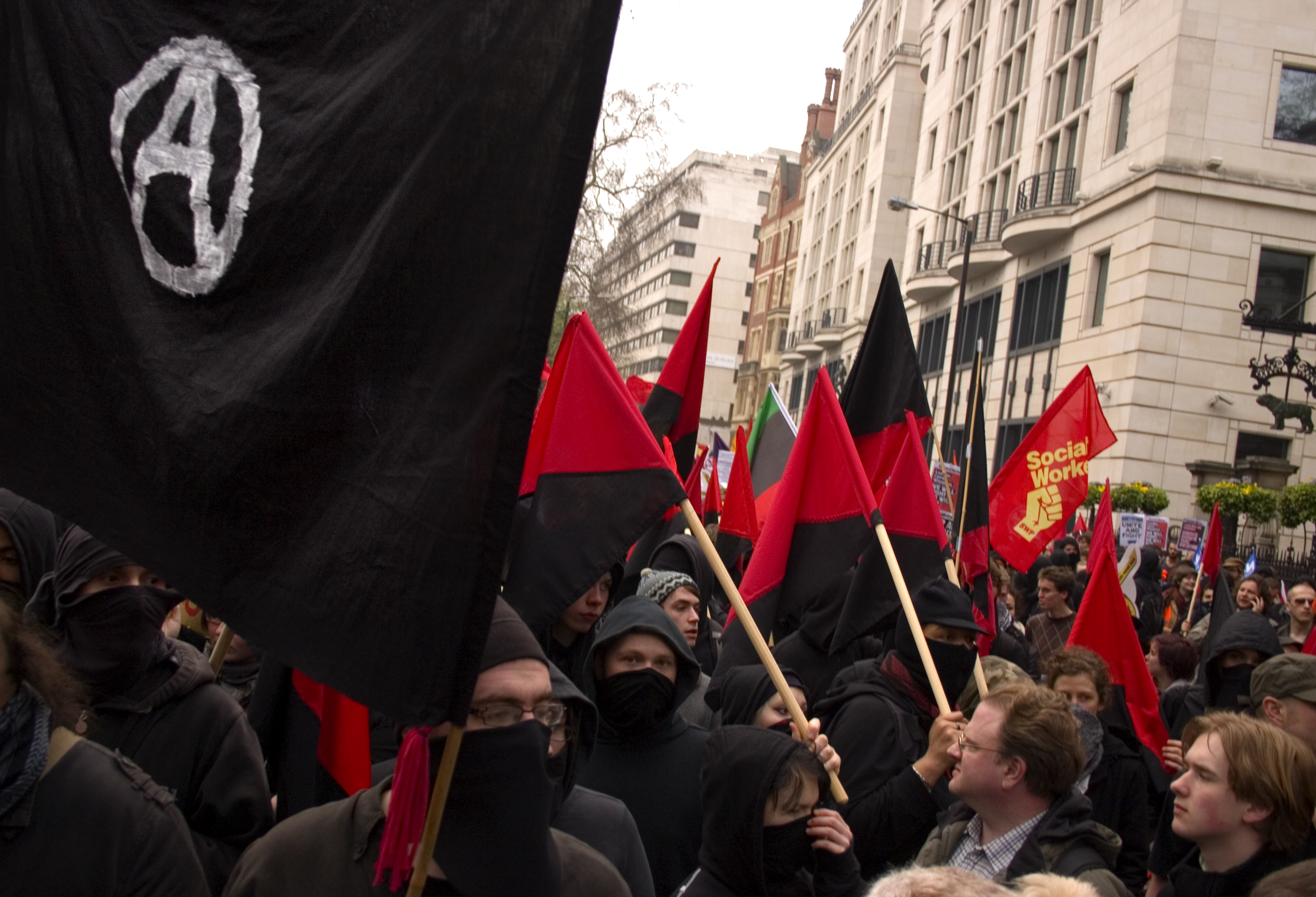
Anarchists in London

Over the years the Freedom editorial group included Jack Robinson, Pete Turner, Colin Ward, Nicolas Walter, Alan Albon, John Rety, Nino Staffa, Dave Mansell, Gillian Fleming, Mary Canipa, Philip Sansom, Arthur Moyse and numerous others. Clifford Harper maintained a loose association for 30 years.

The leading anarcho-pacifist writer and gerontologist Alex Comfort characterised himself as an "aggressive anti-militarist". He held that pacifism rested "solely upon the historical theory of anarchism". An active member of the Peace Pledge Union (PPU) and the Campaign for Nuclear Disarmament, he had been a conscientious objector in World War II. In 1951 Comfort was a signatory of the Authors’ World Peace Appeal. He later resigned from its committee, asserting that Soviet sympathisers now dominated the AWPA. He later in the decade actively supported the Direct Action Committee against Nuclear War. A prominent member of the Committee of 100, he was imprisoned for a month, together with Bertrand Russell and others. They had refused to be bound over, not to take part in a Trafalgar Square mass protest in September 1961. Comfort is Peace and Disobedience (1946), one of many pamphlets he wrote for Peace News and PPU, and Authority and Delinquency in the Modern State (1950). He exchanged public correspondence with George Orwell defending pacifism in the open letter/poem, "Letter to an American Visitor", under the pseudonym "Obadiah Hornbrooke". Comfort's 1972 book The Joy of Sex earned him worldwide fame and $3 million. He regretted that he as a consequence became known as "Dr. Sex" and that his numerous other works received so little attention.

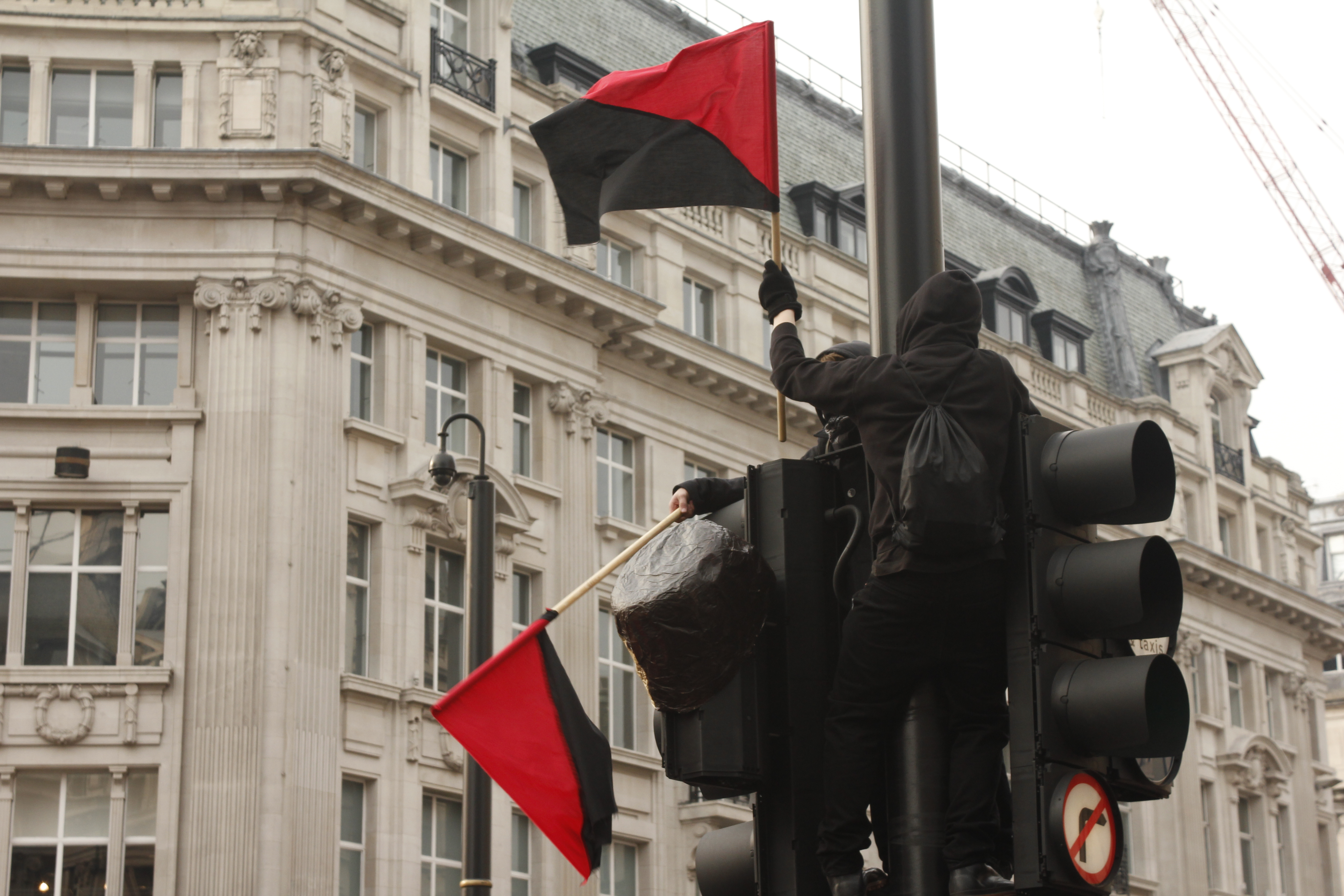
Anarchists in London

On the last day of July 1964 an 18-year-old Stuart Christie departed London for Paris, where he picked up plastic explosives from the anarchist organisation Defensa Interior, and then Madrid on a mission to kill General Francisco Franco. This was to be one of at least 30 attempts on the dictator's life. After his release he continued his activism in the anarchist movement in the United Kingdom. With Miguel Garcia Garcia, 22 years a prisoner of Franco whom he had met in Madrid's Carabanchel Prison, and with Albert Meltzer, he re-formed the Anarchist Black Cross and Black Flag, was acquitted of involvement with the Angry Brigade, and started the publishing house Cienfuegos Press (later Refract Publications), which for a number of years he operated from the remote island of Sanday, Orkney, where he also edited and published a local Orcadian newspaper, The Free-Winged Eagle. Christie wrote with Meltzer, The Floodgates of Anarchy and later We, the Anarchists! A study of the Iberian Anarchist Federation (FAI) 1927-1937 (2000).

=== Squatting since the 1960s ===
In November 1968, together with a group of homeless families, anarchists, some with experience of direct action in the campaign for nuclear disarmament, launched the London Squatters Campaign "for family housing". The campaign's first major test was the occupation of 17 houses in the east London borough of Redbridge. After facing down the forceful efforts of a firm of private bailiffs, and with media coverage playing "a major part", the families and their supporters, persuaded the council to concede the use of empty properties under licence.Colin Ward, who in 1971 had become Education Officer for the Town and Country Planning Association, provided the practice with a philosophical and political defence in Housing: an anarchist approach (1976).

By the end of the 1970s, there estimates of 50,000 squatters in England and Wales, with 30,000 in London. The tabloid press sounded the alarm: what may have "started as a desperate resort by the genuine homeless", was now spreading rapidly at the direction of "extremist political groups" for whom "anybody's home" could be a target. While they were sufficiently concerned to infiltrate and monitor the squatting scene, this was not the view of the Metropolitan Police Special Branch: squatting, they concluded, did "not exist as movement". Among squatting activists, they did identify anarchists as the largest political tendency, although they were not in their view a particularly "unifying", nor – excepting those with "affiliations to Iberia or South America" – challenging, force.

Anarchists have remained prominent in the squatting scene, responding to the progressive criminalisation of the practice by occupying non residential properties – empty shops, pubs, offices, cinemas, churches, warehouses – where the issue of criminal trespass does not immediately arise. This has been for the purpose not only providing homeless shelters, but also social centres and venues. In London, however, criminal trespass law has been openly defied. A group calling themselves the Autonomous Nation of Anarchist Libertarians (ANAL) squatted a series of luxury mansions in order to bring attention to the housing crisis and the scandal of empty buildings. When they occupied the seven storey former Institute of Directors in Pall Mall, in March 2015, they claimed it was the seventeenth building in the area they had stayed in.

=== Punk and anarcho-punk ===
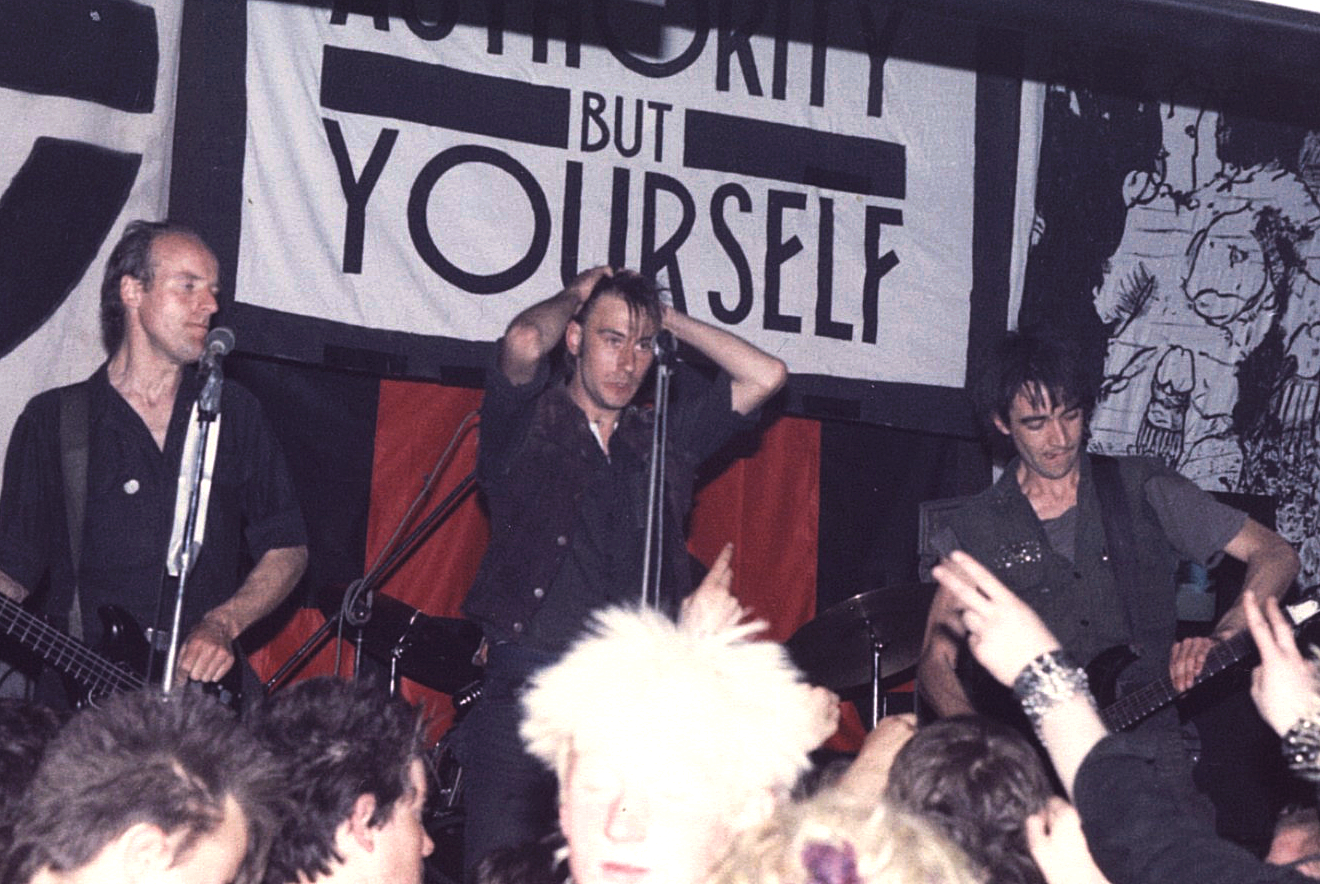
Crass, shown here in 1984, played a major role in introducing anarchism to the punk subculture.

A surge of popular interest in anarchism occurred during the 1970s in the UK following the birth of punk rock, in particular the Situationist-influenced Sex Pistols manager Malcolm McLaren and graphics artist Jamie Reid, as well as that band's first single, "Anarchy in the U.K.". Anarcho-punk bands Crass and the Poison Girls funded the rented Wapping Autonomy Centre with a benefit single and this then inspired other squatted self-managed social centres in London such as the Ambulance Station on Old Kent Road, Centro Iberico, Molly's Café on Upper Street and the Bingo Hall opposite Highbury & Islington station (now the Garage). The concept (and aesthetics) of anarcho-punk was quickly picked up on by bands like Flux of Pink Indians, Subhumans and Conflict.

By the early 1980s, an anarcho-punk scene emerged in Leeds spearheaded by groups such as Abrasive Wheels, the Expelled and Icon A.D. From this scene came Chumbawamba, whose emphasis on confrontational political activism soon overtook their connection to the scene.

Around this time, the anarchist Ian Bone was publishing the community newspaper The Alarm, which he used to expose political corruption in Swansea's local government. In 1983, he moved to London and joined a local autonomist group, to whom he proposed the establishment of an anarchist tabloid newspaper aimed at gaining a wider readership. They began publishing the Class War newspaper, which immediately attracted attention for its celebration of workers assaulting police officers. Class War positioned itself as the antithesis to Thatcherism and the prevailing social order of the 1980s, glorifying workers' solidarity, praising communism and encouraging violence against the rich. This caused a new Red Scare to take hold in the British press, which began writing of an "anarchist menace" as a threat to the British establishment.

Class War broke from anarchism's previous association with lifestylism and liberalism, which had typified the years of the anti-nuclear movement in the United Kingdom. Class War mocked the anarchist pacifism and middle class character of the Campaign for Nuclear Disarmament (CND). According to Albert Meltzer, the newspaper came as a culture shock for the older generation of anarchists, who initially believed it to be a parody of anarchism; correspondents of Freedom denounced the paper's advocacy of violence as "nihilist" and "Marxist".

=== Anti-war, anti-globalisation, protests ===
The American anthropologist and activist David Graeber argues that many direct action protests are implicitly anarchist:

The very notion of direct action, with its rejection of a politics which appeals to governments to modify their behaviour, in favour of physical intervention against state power in a form that itself prefigures an alternative—all of this emerges directly from the libertarian tradition

On this basis, and without counting how many of the people involved call themselves "anarchists", in both Britain and the United States, he identifies a substantial anarchist commitment in the protest, against the First and Second Gulf Wars, and in the general anti-globalisation movement. The international Occupy movement, in its decentralized, leaderless structure and emphasis on direct democracy, drew inspiration from anarchist principles and practices. Its core concerns of economic inequality and corporate influence also resonate with anarchist critiques of capitalism and the state.

In March 2009, Anarchist groups in London participated in "Put People First" march through central London against G20 policies. The anarchist "G20 Meltdown'" declared 1 April "Financial Fools Day" and called for a "carnival" assembly outside the Bank of England. Breaking away from a crowd of 7,000, a small number of activists ransacked an office of the bailed-out Royal Bank of Scotland (a professional photographer claimed to have seen what he presumed were police "agents provocateurs" instigating violence). In March 2011, a half-million strong anti-austerity demonstration called by the TUC in London, was in part "hijacked" by anarchists who attacked The Ritz Hotel, smashed the window of West End banks and fought the police. They justified the violence by citing the failure of the even larger anti-war march inn 2003 to stop the invasion of Iraq: political change, they suggested was not "predicated on being right and winning a debate".

== Organisations ==
=== Extant ===
- Freedom Press (1886–)
- Stapleton Colony (1897–)
- Solidarity Federation (1950–)
- Kate Sharpley Library (1979–)
- The 1 in 12 Club (1981-)
- Class War (1983–)
- Anarchist Federation (1986–)
- Spirit of Revolt Archive (2011–)

=== Historical ===
- Diggers (1649–1651)
- Rose Street Club (1877–1882)
- Labour Emancipation League (1881–1884)
- Socialist League (1885–1901)
- Legitimation League (1893–1899)
- Whiteway Colony (1898–1909)
- Communist League (1919–1920)
- Anti-Parliamentary Communist Federation (1921–1945)
- United Socialist Movement (1934–1965)
- Anarchist Federation of Britain (1937–1950)
- Committee of 100 (1960–1968)
- The Angry Brigade (1970–1972)
- Anarchist Workers Association (1975–1984)
- No War but the Class War (1990–2002)
- Reclaim The Streets (1995–2003)
- Movement Against the Monarchy (1998–2002)
- WOMBLES (1999–2010)

== See also ==
- Category:British anarchists
- List of anarchist movements by region
- "Anarchy in the U.K.", a song by the Sex Pistols
- Anarchism in Ireland
- British Left
- History of the socialist movement in the United Kingdom
- Republicanism in the United Kingdom

== Citations ==
- Bookchin, Murray (1996). "The English Revolution". The Third Revolution. Vol. 1. London: Cassell. pp. 61–142. ISBN 0304335932. OCLC 312686046.
- Cross, Rich (2014). "British anarchism in the era of Thatcherism". In Smith, Evan; Worley, Matthew (eds.). Against the grain: The British far left from 1956. Manchester: Manchester University Press. pp. 133–152. ISBN 978-07190-9590-0. OCLC 941255608.
- Foxley, Rachel (2013). The Levellers: Radical Political Thought in the English Revolution. Manchester: Manchester University Press. ISBN 9780719089367. OCLC 985096392.
- Franks, Benjamin (2006). Rebel Alliances: The Means and Ends of Contemporary British Anarchisms. Edinburgh: AK Press. ISBN 1904859402. OCLC 493946935.
- Goodway, David (2006). Anarchist Seeds Beneath the Snow: Left-Libertarian Thought and British Writers from William Morris to Colin Ward. Liverpool: Liverpool University Press. ISBN 1-84631-025-3. OCLC 939862412.
- Gustav Klaus, H.; Knight, Stephen Thomas (2005). To Hell with Culture: Anarchism and Twentieth-Century British Literature. Cardiff: University of Wales Press. ISBN 0-7083-1898-3. OCLC 57575365.
- Quail, John (2019) [1978]. The Slow Burning Fuse: The Lost History of the British Anarchists. Oakland: PM Press. ISBN 9781629635828. OCLC 1042080070.
- Marshall, Peter H. (2008) [1992]. Demanding the Impossible: A History of Anarchism. London: Harper Perennial. ISBN 978-0-00-686245-1. OCLC 218212571.
- Shipway, Mark (1988). Anti Parliamentary Communism: the movement for workers' councils in Britain, 1917-45. London: Macmillan. ISBN 033343613X. OCLC 468642120.
- Shpayer-Makov, Haia (1988). "Anarchism in British Public Opinion 1880-1914". Victorian Studies. 31 (4). Bloomington: Indiana University Press: 487–516. ISSN 0042-5222. JSTOR 3827854. OCLC 809574647.
