= Rose Street Club =

Radical 19th-century London political society

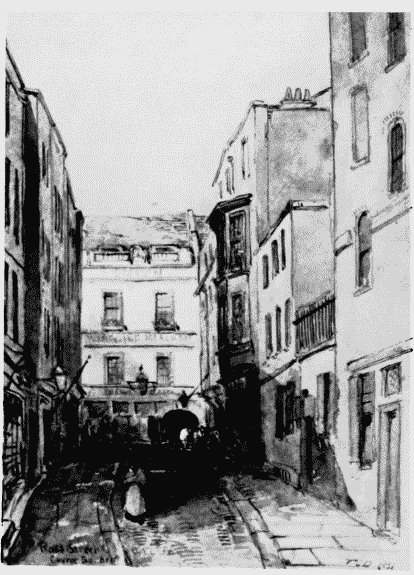
- Rose Street as seen in an original sketch of 1851
- Leader: Johann Most
- President: John Lord
- Secretary: Frank Kitz
- Founded: 1877
- Dissolved: 1882
- Headquarters: Rose Street
- Newspaper: Freiheit
- Ideology: Radicalism; Anarchism
- Political position: Far-left
- Regional affiliation: London

The Rose Street Club (sometimes the International Rose Street Club and earlier the Local Rights Association for Rental and Sanitary Reform) was a far-left, anarchist organisation based in what is now Manette Street, London. (Note: In 1895 Rose Street was renamed after Dickens' fictional character, Dr Manette, who had a surgery in Soho in A Tale of Two Cities. Rose Street itself may originally have named after a tavern.) Originally centred around London's German community, and acting as a meeting point for new immigrants, it became one of the leading radical clubs of Victorian London in the late-nineteenth century. Although its roots went back to the 1840s, it was properly formed in 1877 by members of a German émigré workers' education group, which soon became frequented by London radicals, and within a few years had led to the formation of similar clubs, sometimes in support and sometimes in rivalry. The Rose Street Club provided a platform for the radical speakers and agitators of the day and produced its own paper, Freiheit—which was distributed over Europe, and especially Germany—and pamphlets for other groups and individuals. Although radical, the club initially focused as much on providing a social service to its members as on activism. With the arrival of the anarchist Johann Most in London in the early 1880s, and his increasing influence within the club, it became increasingly aligned with anarchism.

== Background ==
The late-19th century saw the growth of several political organisations in London, many of which formed themselves into clubs. For a while, the literary critic Robert Sampson said, the city was the epicentre of European radicalism during the last decades of the period. At the same time, radicals were being expelled from European cities, particularly in Germany, in what the modern historian Faith Hillis has termed "a tsunami of illiberalism". London, partly due to Britain having a fairly wide freedom of the press, became an attractive place of exile for many of them. Thus clubs such as Rose Street were often majoritively composed of refugees, yet they also attracted English adherents.

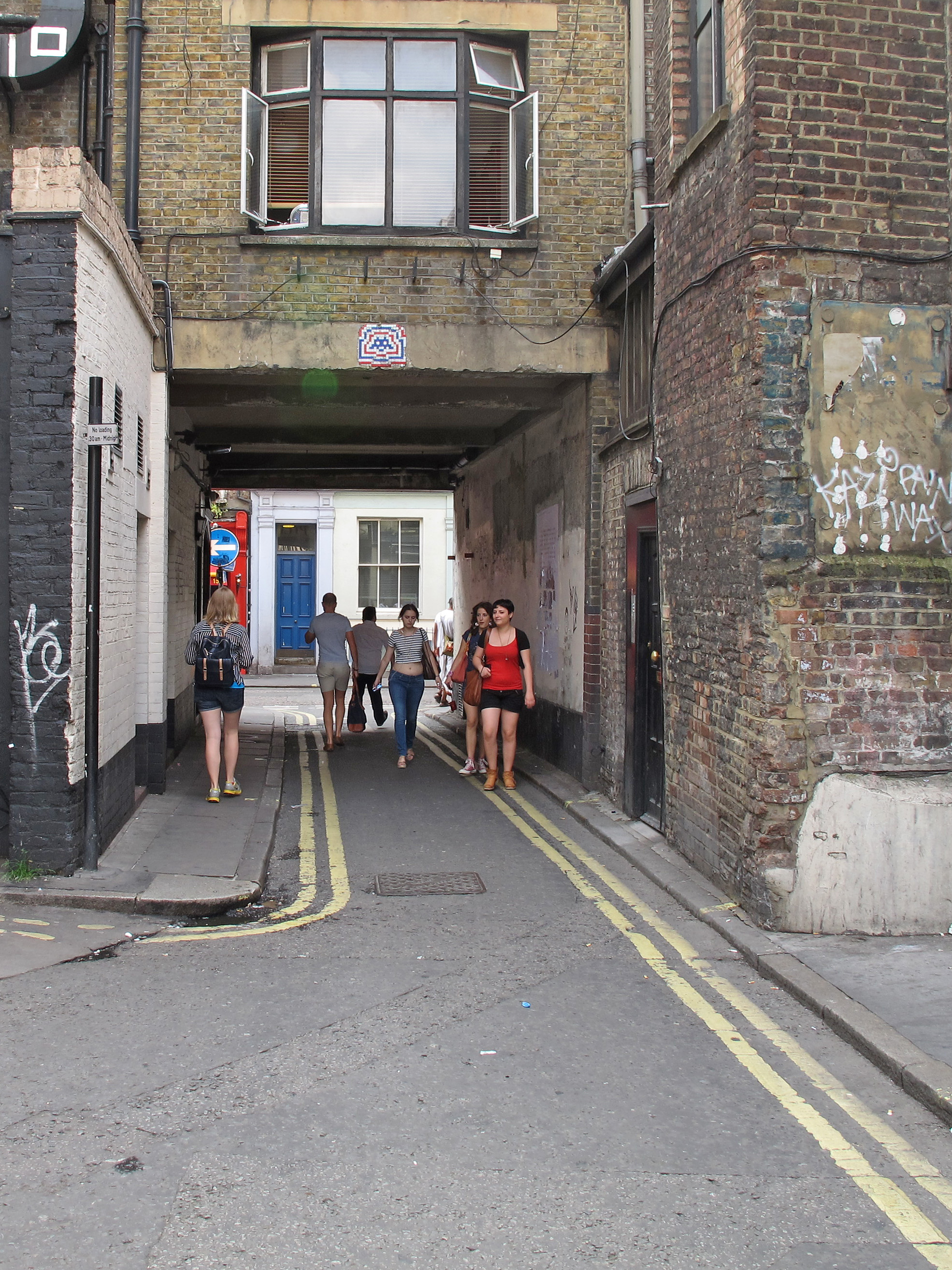
Rose Street—now Manette Street, Soho—as seen in 2014. The black door on the right is at the original entrance to the Club at number 6 Rose Street.

Rose Street itself was a poor area of London in the mid-19th century and was occupied by brothels and frequently infected by cholera outbreaks. A contemporary, George Godwin, reported that the locality was "thickly inhabited by a poor, and in some instances bad class of people". This half-square mile area contained one of the highest concentrations of foreign immigrants than any other part of London. According to Davide Turcato, "anarchist cosmopolitanism [in the area] was markedly international", yet blended into a local tradition of club life. The street also housed many artisan workers, which reflected the mixed demographic make-up of what Stan Shipley has termed "metropolitan clubland". (Note: There was, conversely, also a House of Charity run by High Anglican nuns on Rose Street at the same time.) The club was very near to the Eclectic Hall on Charing Cross Road, and was both the headquarters for a multitude of London political organisations. (Note: Some groups used the Rose Street Club as a method of avoiding self-destruction. In the late 1870s a club based in Rupert Street, who followed the political line of Ferdinand Lassalle, had been engaged in years of internecine political warfare with the Internationalists—followers of Marx and Engels—eventually resolved their differences by merging together into the General Communist Workers' Union and basing themselves at Rose Street.) The economic historian George Cole has argued that, by the 1870s, clubs such as these were the "only definitely socialist organisations" in the country, with Rose Street being chief among them. The historian Sarah Wise wrote that the clubs "provided a popular platform for various other reform-minded and progressive groups and individuals". Similar clubs were based in Fitzrovia, at the Autonomie Club, the Berner Street Club, and the Jubilee Street Club on Commercial Road. The clubs were primarily hubs for organised social networks, but they performed other roles. For example, they linked immigrant politics with domestic English radicalism beneath the clubs' roofs. (Note: It has been suggested that English public opinion—or at least the police—was firmly of the view that these émigré clubs were "hotbeds of international anarchist conspiracies", and according to di Paoli, at least one senior police officer considered London's political clubs to be the source of much of Europe's radical publications.) The latter ranged from national organisations such as the O'Brienite Nationalists to local London groups, including the Stratford Dialectical and Radical Club.

The origins of the Rose Street Club lay in the late-19th century European reaction to radical ideas. Particularly formative were the German Anti-Socialist Laws of 1878, and, more broadly, the Paris Commune of 1871 and the collapse of the First International. Anarchists, persecuted by authoritarian states in continental Europe, especially Imperial Germany, fled to Britain and many settled in London. However, Jonathan Moses has suggested that "their political ideals – the destruction of hierarchy, collective decision making, hostility to the state and capitalism, atheism and free love – did little to ingratiate them to Victorian England." In order to overcome the political isolation of these immigrants, they formed clubs such as the Rose Street Club.

The Rose Street Club succeeded from the 1840s German Communist League. Founded in 1877, the Rose Street Club was a section of the CABV (German Communist Workers' Educational Union, previously known as the German Educational Association for Workers), which split into three connected groups in 1879. Apart from Rose Street—the First Section—there was one based in nearby Tottenham Street (Second Section), and another (the Third section) in Whitechapel. The CABV then merged with the Blue Post group, and the resultant merge was to create the Rose Street Club. Originally founded by members of the German diaspora—for which reason it was called the German society by contemporary Londoners—membership swelled during German Chancellor Otto von Bismarck's repression of social democracy with a wave of younger exiles from Germany. In London, radical clubs such as in Rose Street were a predecessor to the plethora of Marxist clubs that developed later in the 1880s, a period that Wise described as being between "the death of Chartism and the rise of the 'New Socialism'". Although Marx himself died in 1883, his close compatriot and co-author Friedrich Engels waxed somewhat sardonic about the new radical clubs. In a letter to Karl Kautsky he described them as

Some 20–30 little societies which, under various names (always the same people), [who] have been persistently trying to look important for the past twenty years at least and always with the same lack of success ... One’s best course is to do justice to the aspirations without identifying oneself with the persons.

Although Engels called them "very motley" societies, in keeping with the tendency of the time to propagandize the existence of political organisations by bestowing them with "high-sounding titles which the old guard employed in the hope of attracting public interest", in the words of E. P. Thompson, the Club was occasionally known as the "Local Rights Association for Rental and Sanitary Reform".

=== Name ===
Originally based in Great Windmill Street, and called The Great Windmill Street Club as a result, the club took its eventual name in July 1878 when it moved to number six Rose Street, in Soho, which was just off the Charing Cross Road in Soho Square West. This had previously been occupied by the St James and Soho Working Men's Club, although the building by now was almost derelict. They were much larger premises, however, and membership increased proportionately, while at the same time the umbrella organisation were diminishing in popularity. Therefore, working-class leftists formed or joined local clubs.

== Origins, organisation and activities ==
Thousands were expatriates, hundreds of families broken up, hundreds imprisoned; [...] a great number sought refuge in London and our club in Rose Street presented at times the appearance of an arrival or departure platform at a station with luggage and cases of prohibited literature and bewildered emigrants going to and fro.

—Frank Kitz, Freiheit, 1897

The Rose Street Club was an umbrella term for a number of individual societies. Although originally formed within London's German community, it expanded to include a variety of socialist, social-democratic, and radical groups. It also expanded into other languages, and by the time it arrived in Rose Street the club had several distinct language sections: English, French, German, Polish and Russian, reflecting the main countries from which the refugees were arriving. The club—described by Tom Goyens as a "storehouse of revolutionary ideas"—became a model for other clubs for political exiles, in its provision for both refugees and their political organisations, and the most important of them. The Rose Street Club was a firm backer of the radical, anarchist German-language newspaper Freiheit and its political position. The paper was published on the Rose Street premises, which also housed the editorial and composition offices, and was the heart of a complex smuggling operation for European-wide distribution. This political allegiance position was shared by the Whitechapel club, but not by that in Tottenham Street, which by 1880 had become an offshoot of the Rose Street Club for those members who leant towards Marxism rather than anarchism, which, under the leadership of Johann Most, Rose Street was realigning towards. This was as a result of a bitter internal factional struggle. The political scientist, Mark Bevir, has argued that

Much of the membership of Britain's early Marxist organizations came from the popular radicals of the London clubs and the British associates of the European exiles ... But at least in the early 1880s, their politics were either republican or vaguely anarchist forms of radicalism.

The Rose Street Club was not only a political organisation for gatherings of like-minded people, but a social one which provided succour for newly arrived refugees. Originally dedicated to political propaganda, Frank Kitz later recalled how the Rose Street Club gave hospitality, food, shelter, and advice on what the near future might bring their newly arrived compatriots. According to Mark Bevir, the club was a mixture of "fun, education and politics"; for example, at Rose Street, members may arrive to listen to a lecture on Percy Shelley, but end up discussing his politics and that of his circle. Between 14 and 20 July 1881, the Rose Street club was the setting for a series of conferences organised by a chapter of the International Working People's Association, the International Workingman's Association, although the IWA's activities were very little increased by these meetings. Other speakers and organisations that visited the Club included brothers Charles and James Murray, who led a discussion of the poetry of Shelley, with reference to his views on the Irish, and Henry Hyndman. (Note: One of Hyndman's lectures, on 30 October 1881, was entitled "The Tyranny of Capital in America and England". He was described by Engels as an "ambitious party leader ... issuing orders into the void".) At one point, Hyndman expressed interest in the Rose Street Club forming the basis of an official Democratic Party, and a meeting to discuss that proposal was held on 2 March 1881, which comprised a significant cross-section of radical thinkers of the age. Although a resolution was passed which emphasised the importance of forming of a new, broader, party, the proposal came to nothing, and no minutes or other records of how the discussions proceeded have survived. (Note: Not, at least, with the Rose Street Club. Although the meeting of 2 March was the "first step" towards the formation of a broad umbrella Social Democratic Party, it was not until 1884 that the Social Democratic Federation came into existence on the outskirts of the Liberal Party.) Also in regular attendance at the club were the members of the Manhood Suffrage League, (MSL) from which the London clubs drew many members. Membership was often symbiotic, and in this way, as Kitz later said, the MSL "were the chief actors in bringing about the revival of socialism" in the new clubs. In 1882 the French Section of the Rose Street Club split off and moved to new premises. In 1881 the Club held a joint mass-meeting with the Labour Emancipation League on Mile End Waste condemning the government's policy of providing financial assistance to encourage the unemployed to emigrate. (Note: Mile End Waste—open land either side of the Mile End Road—was a popular spot for popular protest, and has been described as "an East End equivalent of Hyde Park, hosting political debates and large-scale strike meetings", by, for example, the East End Radicals in 1885, and the striking matchwomen of 1888.) In July 1883, it was a signatory to the Manifesto of the World, issued by the Social Democratic club. (Note: Apart from the Rose Street Club (which he calls the "German Club") the other signatories were, according to Harry Lee, the International Club in Poland Street, Stephen Mews in Rathbone Place, another German Club in Featherstone Street (off the City Road), some French Communards, the LEL and MSL, the Chelsea Labour Association, the Homerton Socialist Club, and the Stratford and Patriotic Radical Clubs.) The club also organised, and became the headquarters of, the defence committee—called the English Revolutionary Society—supporting Johann Most against his prosecution in April 1881, led by radicals F. W. Soutter and Dr G. B. Clark. The committee New-York Tribune described how Most had been "locked up promptly at the time of his arrest", and had subsequently been charged with publishing what they called "a scandalous, malicious and immoral libel, justifying assassination and murder, inciting persons to conspire against the lives of the sovereigns and rulers of Europe". Although the campaign failed and Most imprisoned, it has been identified as the catalyst for the swift spread of anarchist ideas in Britain, and the growth of organised anarchist groups.

The Rose Street Club published John Sketchley's pamphlet Principles of Social Democracy in 1879.

=== Notable members ===
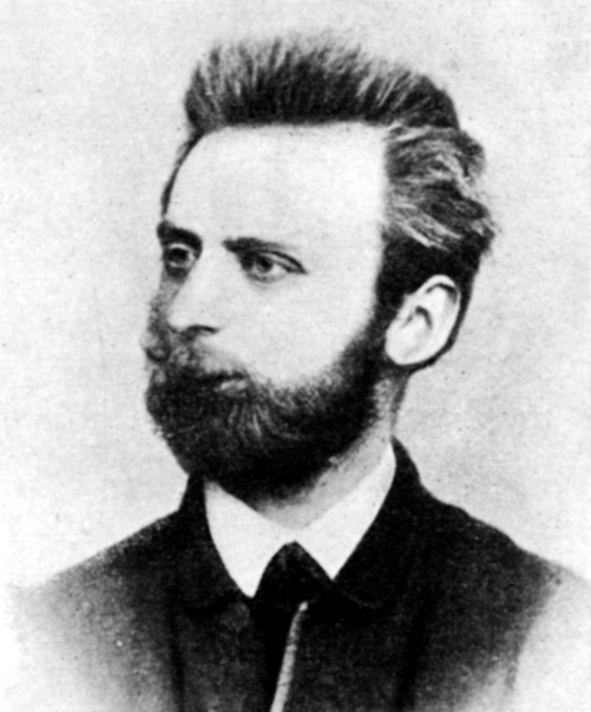
Johann Most in an 1879 photograph, was responsible for taking the Rose Street Club from holding a traditionally radical political stance to an anarchist organisation

Little is known as to the precise composition of the Rose Street Club, and no membership lists are known to survive. Its first president was John Lord of the English Section. Frank Kitz, the Section's secretary and a London dyer, had been instrumental with Lord in forming the English Section in 1879, and would go on to found the Homerton club. Kitz, who was half-English and half-German, had been in London since 1873. Neither the Rose Street Club nor Kitz was anarchist in 1877, and probably would never have been if not for the arrival of Johann Most in London the following year. The club's gradual drift into anarchist politics has been identified, from that point on, as correlating with Kitz' own political shift in that direction during his tenure as part of the club's leadership. Described by Thompson as "the only Socialist in London", he was a "bluff, breezy chap, fond of his beer and jolly company".

Johann Most was one of the radicals who fled Bismark's legislative program in the late 1870s. Soon after joining Rose Street, he began publishing the radical newspaper Freiheit (English: Freedom). The first issue was January 1879, and it saw immediate popularity; by December that year, it had a relatively large readership in Germany. Most was an advocate of the propaganda of the deed, and in one of his most famous articles he approved of the assassination of Tsar Nicholas II of Russia, for which he was prosecuted in the British courts. (Note: The reason for the British government's hard line with political radicalism when it advocated armed struggle was the result of the then-recent armed Fenian campaign: "Britain had been the target of attacks from the American branch of the Irish republican movement since 1870, and a new onslaught started just as Most's case began".) Even though he was sentenced to 16-months' hard labour, (Note: It was rumoured in London that Bismark had personally requested that Britain take action against Most. Although Home Secretary William Harcourt, denied the accusation in the House of Commons, the Rose Street Club offered a £300 reward for the letter Bismark was supposed to have written to the British government.) Freiheit survived, and continued a similar editorial line. The following year Irish Fenian radicals assassinated Lord Cavendish and Thomas Burke in Dublin. The paper stated that the assassination was "the unavoidable result of English tyranny in Ireland". Frank Kitz took over as editor before production was transferred from Rose Street to Switzerland on a temporary basis. One of Most's confederates was Andreas Scheu, a leading Austrian anarchist, tried for his politics by the government in 1880 and arriving in London four years later, when he joined the Rose Street Club. However, he soon became disillusioned with the Club's internal factionalism and left for the DF.

Along with Kitz, another of the club's co-founders had been Victor Dave, and anarchists Errico Malatesta, an Italian, and the Russian Peter Kropotkin were also members during their stays in London. Jack Williams regularly spoke at the Rose Street Club on matters ranging from Irish nationalism (Note: Williams had joined the Irish Land League at the same time as the Rose Street Club, and political historian Florence Boos has described how although he was "raised in a succession of workhouses ... for almost 30 years was a constant organiser of meetings of the unemployed". During a clash between police and socialist protesters, who had marched to Highgate Cemetery to celebrate Marx's birthday, William Morris recounted how "a rather feeble attempt by the hobblehoys to interrupt which our people checked with the loss of one hat" belonging to Williams.) to British republicanism, popular at the time among lower-class Londoners. With Williams there were other English militants based at the club, including Joseph Lane and Edwin Dunn. Lane was an "intensely earnest" agitator (according to his colleague Ambrose Barker, and a "tireless propagandist" according to Harry Lee) for the Rose Street Club from the late 1870s. Originally a carter, he arrived in London in 1865 or 1866. He joined the Freiheit Defence Committee and was active in producing the English edition. (Note: Lane was later responsible for forming the Homerton Club in Hackney and organising the Mile End Waste meetings.) Dunn played a leading role in convening the meetings surrounding discussion of the creation of a new democratic party in early 1881. In 1880, Louise Michel, a leading French anarchist who had fought with and lived through the Commune, stayed at the Rose Street Club during her sojourn in London following her exile in New Caledonia. The club was instrumental in raising the funds required for her return to Paris following the 1880 amnesty for those who had taken part.

== Legacy ==
Although its membership was dominated by refugees, the Rose Street Club has been described as overseeing a transition between the previous, older generation of political radicals—such as Chartists, English republicans and O'Brienites (Note: Bevir argues, for example, that "whilst some club members already held radical views others learnt their radicalism from the O'Brienites before going on to join the Marxist groups of the 1880s".)—and the younger socialists and anarchists. The street has been described by Nick Heath as having "probably more long-term associations with anarchism –and radicalism in general than any other street in Britain"; it was still actively connected to anarchism in the 1950s when the London Anarchist Group held open-air meetings in what by then was Manette Street. Henry James' novel The Princess Casamassima is set against the backdrop of the anarchist politics of working-class London in the 1880s, and a scene is set at the Rose Street Club itself; although a twentieth-century commentator has "questioned whether to praise or to blame James for meddling in a subject he himself admits he knew next to nothing about".
