= Fred Henderson =

English socialist writer, journalist and Labour politician

James Frederick Henderson (February 1867 – 18 July 1957) was an English socialist writer and journalist, and a Labour Party politician.

== Early life ==
Born in Norwich, he was the son of James Alexander Henderson, a clothier. He was educated at the city's Old Presbyterian School, the Belfast Mercantile Academy and Owens College, Manchester. He first worked as a journalist for The Star newspaper in London, where he met T. P. O'Connor, George Bernard Shaw and William Morris, and became a committed socialist. He corresponded with Morris from Bradford.

In Norwich, Henderson was involved in a local branch of the Socialist League in 1886. In the following year, he was arrested on 14 January with Charles Mowbray, and sentenced to four months imprisonment for incitement to riot after groups of unemployed workers looted food shops. He was detained in Norwich Gaol where he was one of the last prisoners in England to be put to work on the penal treadmill. In August 1887, Michael McCartan put a question in the House of Commons about Henderson's July arrest by a mounted police constable, replied to by Henry Matthews. Cunninghame Graham also involved himself in the question.

In 1887, Henderson annoyed Mowbray by claiming a leadership role of the "Anarchist Group." By 1888, matters were different, when Henderson joined forces with John Lincoln Mahon to organise a "Labour Party." His name was linked in 1889 to Mahon's as labour agitators in hostile comment from St Stephen's Review. It referred to the 1889 London dock strike, and Henry Cecil Raikes as Postmaster-General resisting unionisation of postal workers. A damning unsigned newspaper article from the time of the 1893 scandal conceded that Henderson "had a glib tongue and took a useful part in the work of administration at the time of the great dock strike." He entered local politics in 1890 when he was elected to the Norwich Board of Guardians.

== London politics ==
By 1892, Henderson was back in London, where he founded the Clapham Labour League. He was one of six candidates supported by the Labour Representation League who were elected to the London County Council, representing Clapham. These "Lib-Lab" councilors formed part of the majority Liberal-backed Progressive Party that controlled the council. In 1893, he showed an interest in the National Free Labour Association of William Collison, which was not reciprocated.

His membership of the council was to last only a year, however: on 9 March 1893 he was found guilty of stealing three shillings from a prostitute, and he was sentenced to four months imprisonment with hard labour. Although he protested his innocence, his resignation from the council was accepted on 28 March.

== Later life ==
Returning to Norwich, Henderson worked as a journalist. He acted as editor for Labour Leader, a London weekly under the control of Keir Hardie and the Independent Labour Party (ILP) by the mid-1890s. At this period he was a member of the Fabian Society. He was involved in the Norwich Labour Church, arguing in an address published as Politics in the Pulpit that "individual sin" was "only a knot in the vast network and entanglement of social and industrial conditions".

In 1902 Henderson was the first socialist to be elected to the city council, for the Fye Bridge ward; he failed to be re-elected, however, in 1905. He was not reconciled to the economic views of Louis Tillett, the Liberal leader: while in 1903 he could define liberalism in terms of people being able to run their own affairs, by 1906 the Liberals appeared to him inflexible on economic doctrine. His wife Lucy was a Poor Law Guardian, and served on the council from 1920. Henderson returned to the council for the rest of his life, from 1923 as an alderman.

With Keir Hardie, Henderson attempted to adapt the ideas of Hilaire Belloc's The Servile State (1912) to socialist thinking, though not with Belloc's approval. In late 1913 and early 1914 he intervened in the debate over guild socialism.

Henderson was chosen as the Liberal Party candidate for East Norfolk, for the December 1918 general election. At that time he was working for the Eastern Daily Press, where he was a leader writer. The Conservative Michael Falcon won the seat. Supporting Falcon, an election letter signed Lloyd George and Bonar Law stated that Henderson "had done good work at home", but rated Falcon's service in the Sinai and Palestine campaign more highly.

Peter Clarke, biographer of Stafford Cripps, suggests that Henderson, a veteran of the Socialist League of the 1880s and a "provincial ILP leader", was one of those consulted in the formation of its namesake the Socialist League of 1932, along with J. T. Murphy. Its formation was a response to the split of the ILP from its Labour Party affiliation. Henderson wrote to G. D. H. Cole that the ILP should simply be allowed to go its way, but he did come to see a role for the League.

Henderson served as Lord Mayor of the city in 1939–1940. He was granted the freedom of the city in 1947. He made arrangements for a memorial to Robert Kett for the 400th anniversary of Kett's Rebellion in 1949.

=== The Henderson School and legacy ===
Henderson lived in Earlham Rise, Norwich. The Henderson School in Norwich was named after him, and was a World War II foundation in 1943, for boys; the Gurney School on the same site on Bowthorpe Road was for girls. It became a secondary modern school, from which a running track remains. The Gurney Henderson School was formed by amalgamation, from 1970 being known as the Bowthorpe Comprehensive School, closing in 1991. The Henderson Cinder Track is now part of the Henderson Park business area.

== Works ==
=== Poetry ===
Henderson began publishing poetry at the age of 16, with Alice and Other Poems (1884): he may have sent it to William Morris (there is some uncertainty in identifying the recipient of one of Morris's letters). Following his release from prison in 1887 he wrote Echoes of the Coming Day: Socialist Songs and Rhymes. In his Pilgrims of Hope period from 1885, Morris freely gave Henderson advice in letters, in particular on writing "in a time of rising hope for the people." He pointed to the need for elevated language, but also to his respect for "campaigning poetry" rooted in activism. In 1888 Henderson published sonnets Love Triumphant. A review in To-day: Monthly Magazine of Scientific Socialism, edited by Belfort Bax and others, found these derivative.

Socialist fly-bills for the 1887 Golden Jubilee of Queen Victoria had on one side Socialists and the Jubilee by Frank Kitz and a poem by Henderson about the occasion on the other. His work was included in the song collection Chants of Labour (1888) by Edward Carpenter: "The Workers' Song of the Springtide" appeared in The Commonweal, the Socialist League newspaper, in 1886, and as "Song of the Springtide" became an anthology piece. An Ode (1886) was reprinted in 1913 from the Manchester University Magazine.

Henderson also published By the Sea: And Other Poems (1891). A review in Igdrasil stated "This unpretentious little volume contains some well-written verses, directed for the most part against the conditions which hamper life in most large towns." In The Christian Socialist, E.D.G. (Edgar Deacon Girdlestone) wrote "The staple of our poet's muse is indignation at mammon-worship, and the frank acknowledgment that there would be room for nothing but despair, if he did not wage battle against the lies and shams of our social life." A review of the second edition noted the dedication to Frederic Charles, a Socialist League member of the Norwich branch, imprisoned in the Walsall case of 1891.

When Alfred, Lord Tennyson died in 1892, W. E. Gladstone had a shortlist of possible replacements as Poet Laureate, which included Henderson. Others considered were Alfred Austin, Robert Bridges, Lewis Morris and William Watson. Gladstone reportedly took Henderson to be a "strong young poet", but held the prison term against him. The position was left vacant, only being filled in 1895.

=== Political writings ===
Henderson was an active public speaker and lecturer, who wrote books and pamphlets. His major work was a book based on a series of Norwich Labour Church sermons, and published by the Independent Labour Party (ILP) as The Case for Socialism in 1911. It built on The ABC of Socialism, a pamphlet which was its first chapter, and an agreed ILP definition of socialism. It was influential and was translated into several languages.

Tommy Douglas read The Case for Socialism in 1931, alongside Walter Rauschenbusch and William Wordsworth. Within the Co-operative Commonwealth Federation, also in Canada, the book was widely circulated in the 1930s. Edgar Hardcastle writing in the Socialist Standard in 1946 commented on the past popularity of The Case for Socialism, and contrasted its approach based on dispossession to deal with capitalism with that of Clement Attlee in The Labour Party in Perspective (1937).

Other works were:

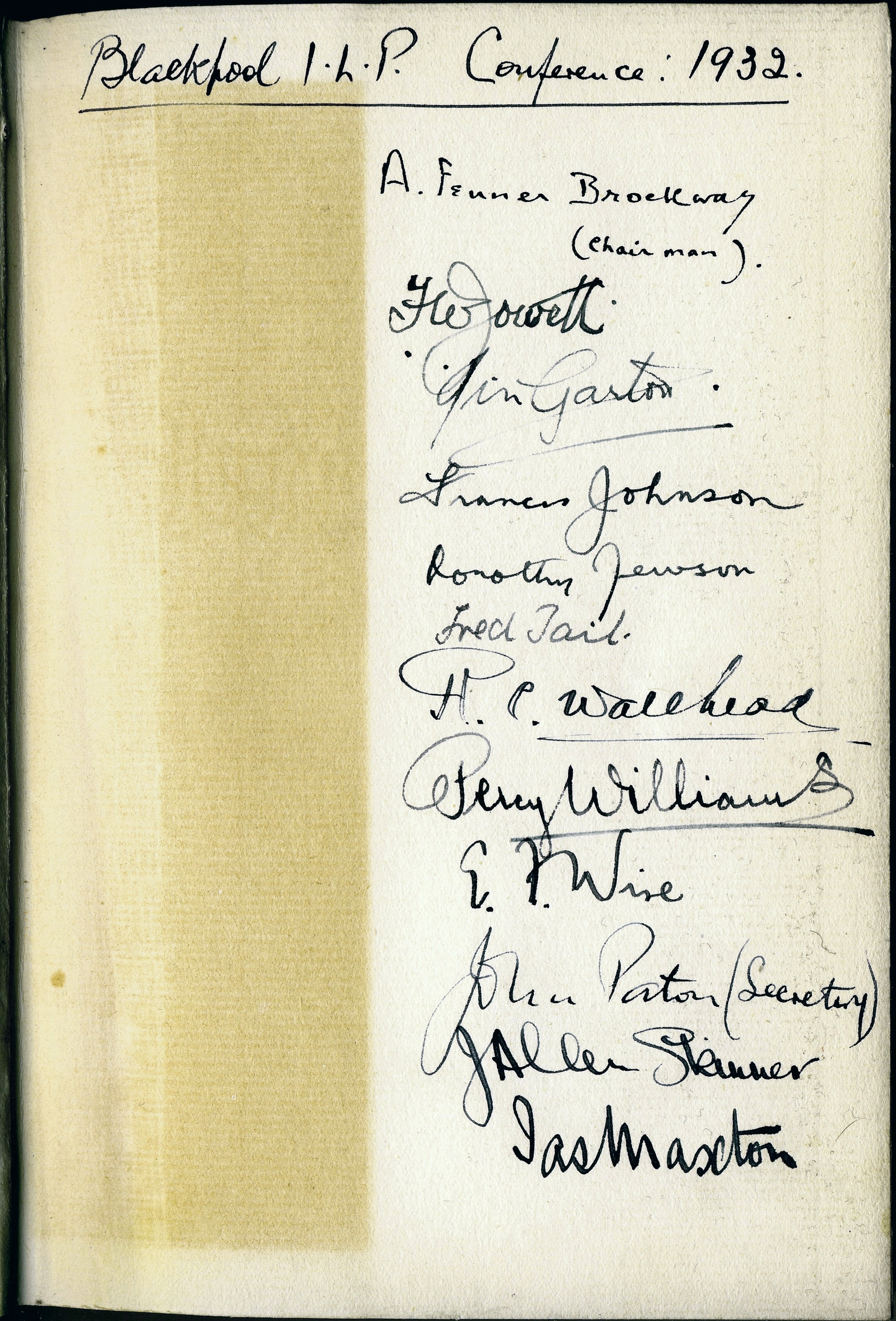
Signatures of leading members of the Independent Labour Party in a copy of The Economic Consequences of Power Production by Fred Henderson

- The Labour Unrest, what it is and what it portends (1911)
- The New Faith: A Study of Party Politics and the War (1915);
- The Economic Consequences of Power Production (1931), which was read by Aldous Huxley in 1932 at the time when he was writing the play Now More Than Ever;
- Money Power and Human Life (1932);
- Foundations For The World's New Age of Plenty (1933)
- Planning or Chaos? (3rd edn, 1935)
- Capitalism and the Consumer (1935).

George Catlin in the American Political Science Review commended the answer given in A Planned Society (1932) by George Henry Soule Jr. to the issue raised by The Economic Consequences of Power Production.

Pamphlets included:

- Socialism and Liberty (1907)
- Socialism and Tariff Reform
- Socialism of the I.L.P. (1922)
- The Socialist Goal (1931)
- The Social Credit Illusion (1934, Vancouver), based on a speech there in November of that year.
