= Charles Mowbray =

English anarcho-communist (1857–1910)

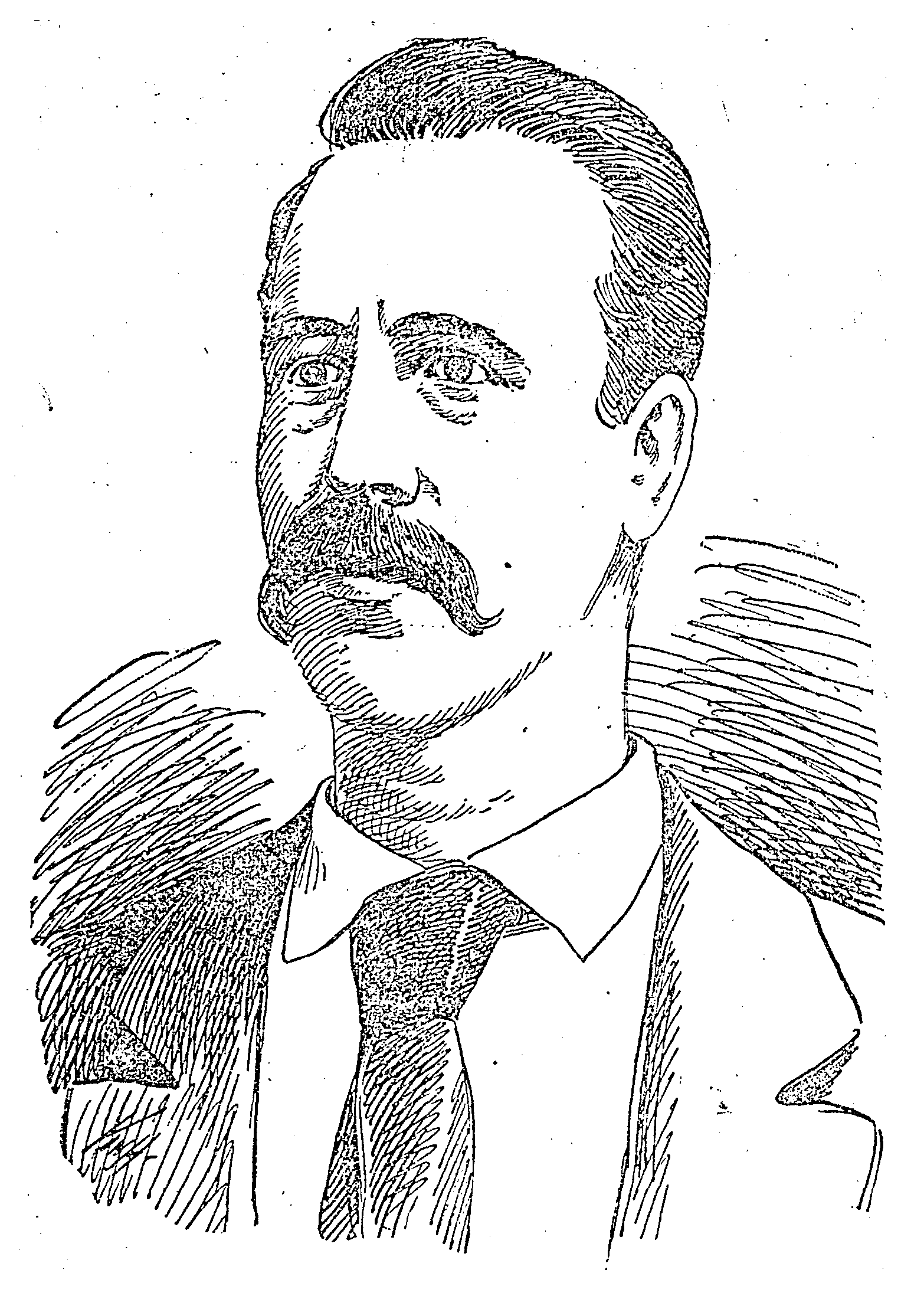
- Illustration of Mowbray published 1895
- Born: Charles Wilfred Mowbray; 1857; Bishop Auckland, County Durham, England
- Died: December 1910 (aged 52–53); Bridlington, Yorkshire, England
- Occupations: Tailor; Trade unionist; Public speaker
- Movement: Anarchism
- Spouse: Mary Benoit (m. 1878; died 1892)

Charles Wilfred Mowbray (1857 – December 1910) was an English anarcho-communist agitator, tailor, trade unionist and public speaker. Mowbray was an active orator and agitator in the Labour Emancipation League, and then the Socialist League, becoming the publisher of the Socialist League's newspaper Commonweal in 1890. At this time he began describing himself as an anarcho-communist. He was arrested in 1892 and charged with conspiracy to murder in a high-profile trial but was acquitted. At this time he reportedly worked as a police informant. From 1894 he lived and worked in the United States where he went on speaker tours before being deported in the wake of the assassination of President McKinley. Back in England he moved away from anarchism and began lecturing on tariff reform (protectionism) and was funded by the National Union of Conservative Associations.

== Biography ==
Mowbray was born in Bishop Auckland, County Durham in 1857. In his youth he served in the Durham Light Infantry which resulted in him being firmly anti-war. Mowbray became a tailor by trade. In 1878, he married Mary Benoit whose father Joseph Benoit had been a well known communard. Mowbray and Mary went on to have five children.

=== Political agitation ===
In the early 1880s Mowbray was living in a notorious London slum, the Old Nichol, and was active in the Labour Emancipation League alongside Frank Kitz. In 1885 they both joined the newly forming Socialist League. Mowbray became known for his public speaking at a time of increasing police repression of open-air meetings.

In September 1885 Mowbray was prosecuted and fined alongside another socialist for "obstructing a public thoroughfare", namely Dod Street in Limehouse, London, after the police attacked a large outdoor protest meeting.

In June 1886 he was arrested at a rally in Trafalgar Square and fined £1. Later that year he moved to Norwich and began political agitating there.

On 14 January 1887, Mowbray and writer Fred Henderson addressed a public meeting of unemployed workers in Norwich in what became known as the "Battle of Ham Run". After the meeting the crowd marched on the Guildhall to lobby the mayor, and began smashing the windows of a bank and several shops. Mowbray and Henderson were both arrested. Mowbray was sentenced to nine months hard labour at Norwich Castle for "riot with force, injuring buildings and assault". Henderson was sentenced to four months imprisonment. William Morris wrote a play, The Tables Turned; or, Nupkins Awakened, satirising the trial and judiciary. A committee was formed to support Mowbray's wife and five children while he was in prison.

Prison further politicised Mowbray, and after his release he began openly advocating for the use of dynamite and propaganda by the deed. However, according to Special Branch ledgers at this time he also worked for William Melville as a police informant, "organising secret shadowers of anarchists".

In 1889 he was elected onto the strike committee for the successful three-week long tailors strike, developing a close relationship with the Jewish anarchist movement.

He became an active member of the Labour Emancipation League. Mowbray was antagonistic towards anarchism until the late 1880s.

Differences within the League sharpened, particularly over the use of violence in the immediate struggle. At the 1890 annual conference of the Socialist League, William Morris was ousted as editor of Commonweal and was replaced by David Nicoll and Frank Kitz with Mowbray as publisher. Morris left the League later in the same year, but the removal of his moderating influence and substantial funding shook morale. There was also an increase in violent rhetoric in Commonweal under Nicoll's editorship, with Nicoll arguing that "Individual assaults on the system will lead to riots, riots to revolts, revolts to insurrection, insurrection to revolution."

=== Commonweal trial ===
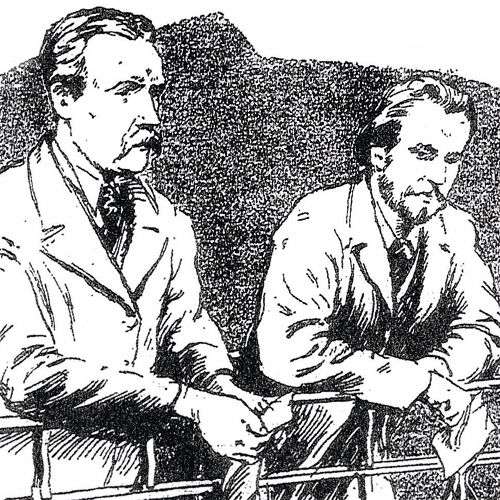
Mowbray with David Nicoll in court

In an article in Commonweal in April 1892 David Nicoll criticised Justice Henry Hawkins, who had presided over the Walsall anarchist trial, and asked whether Hawkins, the Home Secretary Henry Matthews or Inspector William Melville were "fit to live".

On the morning of the 19th April Mowbray's wife, Mary, died at home of tuberculosis. Four hours later the police arrested Mowbray at his home for incitement to murder Matthews, Hawkins and Melville. His young children were left alone in the house with their dead mother.

William Morris paid £500 for Mowbray's bail so he could attend the funeral without a police escort. The funeral was attended by several thousand people.

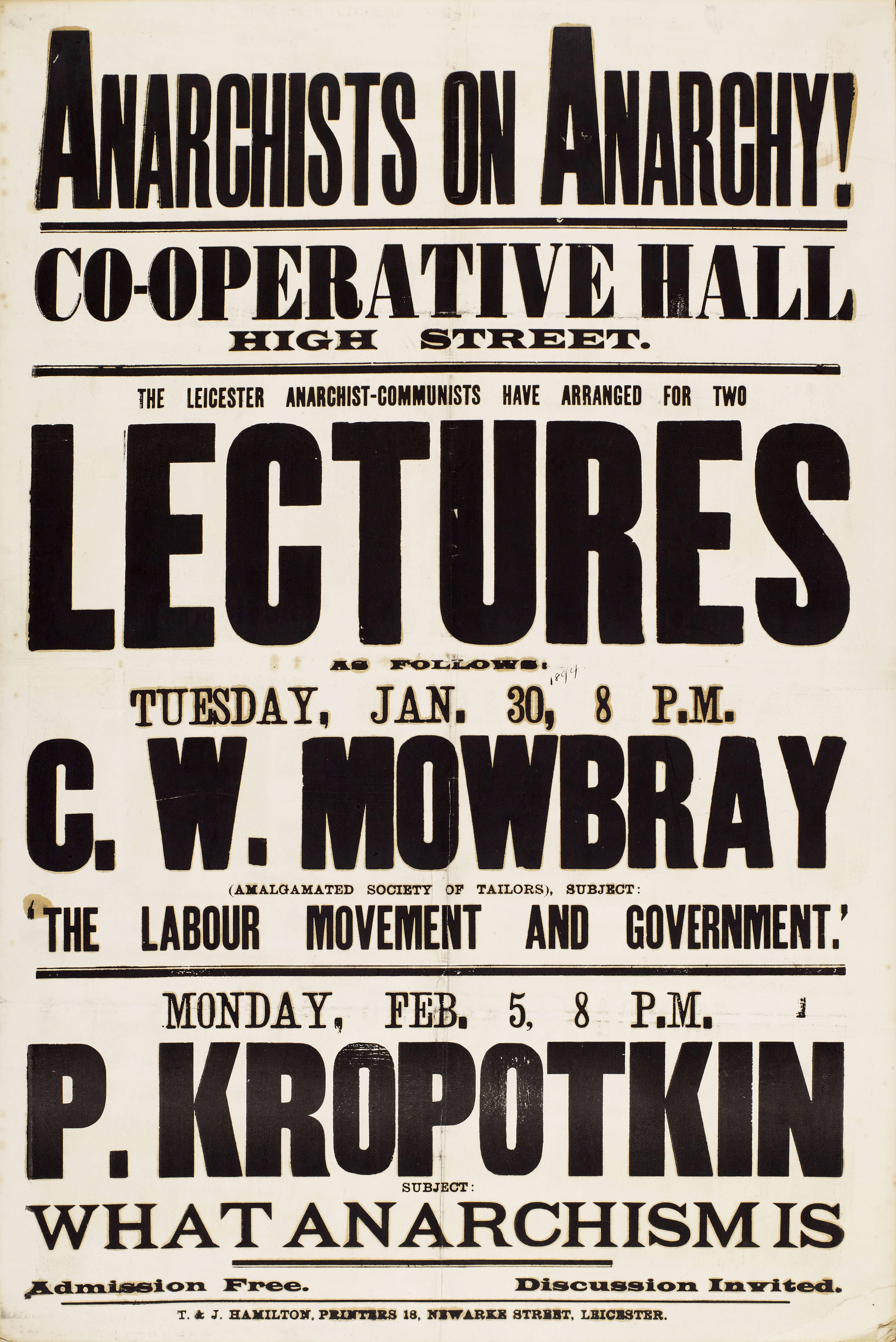
An 1894 poster for a lecture by Mowbray on the labour movement and government

Nicoll denied any intention to incite murder, stating that the article had been written in "hot blood". Mowbray argued that he had not been involved in producing the paper as he had been caring for his wife. Mowbray was acquitted while Nicoll was sentenced to 18 months imprisonment with hard labour.

In 1893 Mowbray was a delegate at the Zürich Anarchist Congress.

=== The United States ===
In 1894, Mowbray travelled to the United States for a speaking tour in cities on the East Coast. On 28 December 1894 Mowbray gave a lecture to the Ladies' Liberal League in Philadelphia after which he was arrested and charged with inciting riot and sedition. His host, Voltairine de Cleyre, formed a defence committee which succeeded in getting him released.

In early 1894, Mowbray settled in Boston and began working as a tailor. That same year Mowbray was used as an example during debates in Congress on the government's inability to stop anarchists from entering the United States.

Mowbray moved his family to Boston in April 1895 with the help of Josef Peukert. Later that year he did another speaking tour. In Boston Mowbray's public speaking helped inspire printer Harry Kelly into becoming an anarchist. In September 1895 Mowbray and Kelly helped launch and edited a short-lived anarcho-communist newspaper, The Rebel.

Mowbray later moved to New York, then Hoboken, New Jersey. In Hoboken he opened a saloon and became a heavy drinker. Following the assassination of President McKinley in 1901 Mowbray was one of a number of anarchists deported from the US.

=== Later life ===
Mowbray returned to London where he joined the Industrial Union of Direct Actionists which had been founded by John Turner and Charles Lahr and returned to public speaking in support of anarchism. However, Mowbray then appeared to have abandoned his anarchist beliefs and began lecturing on tariff reform (protectionism). This included touring the country for the National Union of Conservative Associations.

In December 1910, Mowbray died in bed from heart failure at a hotel in Bridlington, Yorkshire. He had been in the area speaking in support of Conservative Party candidate Mark Sykes who was running against the incumbent Liberal MP Luke White. White was also the district coroner and presided over the inquest into Mowbray's death. He was buried in London.

== Bibliography ==
- Avrich, Paul (1988). "C. W. Mowbray: A British Anarchist in America". Anarchist Portraits. Princeton University Press. pp. 153–162. ISBN 0-691-04753-7. OCLC 17727270.
