= Joseph Lane (socialist) =

English socialist campaigner (1851–1920)

- Born: 2 April 1851; Benson, Oxfordshire, England
- Died: 3 September 1920 (aged 69); East Ham, Essex, England
- Occupations: Campaigner; Writer; Carter; Furrier
- Movement: Socialist
- Spouse: Isabella Adams (m. 1874)

Joseph Lane (2 April 1851 – 3 September 1920) was an English libertarian socialist campaigner.

== Biography ==
Lane was born on 2 April 1851 in Benson, Oxfordshire, England, to Thomas Lane, who was a cordwainer, and Mercy Lane (née Warner). Lane had very little education, beginning farm work at a young age. As a boy he also took a keen interest in politics and attending election meetings. He moved to London and at the age of 15 began work as a carter. In the early 1870s he was involved in the Land Tenure Reform Association and the republican movement.

On 5 September 1874 he married Isabella Adams, with whom he had number of children.

He took part in the Manhood Suffrage League, the English section of the Social Democratic Club, the Marylebone Radical Association, and the Local Rights Association.

In 1881 he was involved in producing the anarchist journal Freiheit and the weekly newspaper The Radical. He also formed the Homerton Social Democratic Club and was a delegate for the club at the International Revolutionary Congress. In 1882 he became secretary of the newly formed Labour Emancipation League which he had formed alongside Frank Kitz, Ambrose Parker, and Tom Lemon. 1884 saw the Labour Emancipation League merge with the Democratic Federation to form the Social Democratic Federation before seceding to join the newly formed Socialist League. In 1885 he was involved in publishing the Socialist League's newspaper, The Commonweal. In 1887 he published the pamphlet An Anti-Statist, Communist Manifesto. Lane resigned from the Socialist League in 1889 and largely withdrew from politics.

Lane later worked at a firm of furriers. He died in East Ham, Essex on the 3 September 1920 aged 69. On his death he was described as a shopkeeper.

== Publications ==
- An Anti-Statist, Communist Manifesto (1887)
