= Labour Emancipation League =

- Abbreviation: LEL
- Secretary: Aaron Moseley; Joseph Lane
- Founders: Ambrose Barker; Tom Lemon; Joseph Lane; Frank Kitz
- Founded: 1881
- Dissolved: 1884
- Split from: Stratford Dialectical and Radical Club
- Merged into: Social Democratic Federation
- Succeeded by: Socialist League
- Headquarters: Mile End
- Ideology: Socialism; Marxism; Chartism; Mutualism

The Labour Emancipation League was a socialist organisation in London.

The origins of the league lay in the 1880 split from the National Secular Society of the Stratford Dialectical and Radical Club around Ambrose Barker. In 1881, the club was forced to abandon its activities, although it remained in existence as the Homerton Socialist Society.

Barker and Tom Lemon from the society joined with Joseph Lane and Frank Kitz to hold regular public meetings in Mile End. These proved a success, and they formed the Labour Emancipation League to continue this work. The first secretary, Aaron Moseley, soon resigned and was replaced by Lane.

The league was influenced by Marxism, Chartism and Proudhonism. Its programme called for:

- Equal direct adult suffrage
- Direct legislation by the people
- Abolition of the standing army
- The people to decide on peace or war
- Free secular and industrial education
- Liberty of speech, press and meeting
- Free administration of justice
- The nationalisation of land, mines and transport
- Society to regulate production and wealth to be shared equitably by all
- The monopoly of the capitalist class to be broken and the means of production transformed into collective or public property

The League soon spread across the East End of London. In 1884, it joined H. M. Hyndman's Democratic Federation, which was consequently renamed the Social Democratic Federation and adopted much of the League's programme. However, in 1885 the East London branch of the SDF was one of several to split and form the Socialist League.

== Bibliography ==
- Quail, John (2019) [1978]. "2. The Labour Emancipation League". The Slow Burning Fuse: The Lost History of the British Anarchists. Oakland: PM Press. pp. 32–39. ISBN 9781629635828. OCLC 1042080070. Archived from the original on 28 October 2009.
- Walter, Nicolas (27 January 2007). "Lane, Joseph, 1851-1920". Libcom.org.
