= Frank Kitz =

English anarchist (1849–1923)

- Born: Francis Platt; 1849; Kentish Town, London, United Kingdom of Great Britain and Ireland
- Died: 8 January 1923 (aged 73–74); Balham, London, United Kingdom
- Occupations: Dyer; Writer
- Movement: Anarchism

Frank Kitz (1849 – 8 January 1923) was an English anarchist.

== Life ==
Born in the Kentish Town area of London as Francis Platt, he was illegitimate and grew up in poverty. He later claimed that his father was a German refugee from the revolutions of 1848, although his biological father was asserted by Florence Boos to have been John Lewis, an English watchmaker. He supported the ideals of the French Revolution in his youth, and attended radical meetings, such as those of the Reform League, participating in the Hyde Park riot of 1867.

Platt completed an apprenticeship as a dyer, and travelled extensively looking for work. He was particularly impressed by the poverty he saw in the industrial cities of northern England. On several occasions, he supported himself by enlisting in the British Army and then absconding.

Around 1874, he took the surname "Kitz", and settled in Soho. There, he joined the Democratic and Trades Alliance Association, soon renamed as the Manhood Suffrage League. In this organisation, he met veterans of the Chartist movement, and also of the International Workingmen's Association, and served for a time as the league's secretary. By 1877, the league was in decline, and Kitz, fluent in both English and German, founded the English Revolutionary Society, which brought together league members and recent German immigrants. This moved into premises on Rose Street, and became widely known as the Rose Street Club. In 1879, he set up a printing shop on Boundary Street in Shoreditch, and began putting out propaganda, particularly focusing on supporting rent strikes.

Johann Most, a former German parliamentarian, and the editor of Freiheit, became prominent in the Rose Street Club. In 1881, he was sentenced to hard labour for publishing an article calling for assassinations of rulers; Kitz then took over the editorship for a short time.

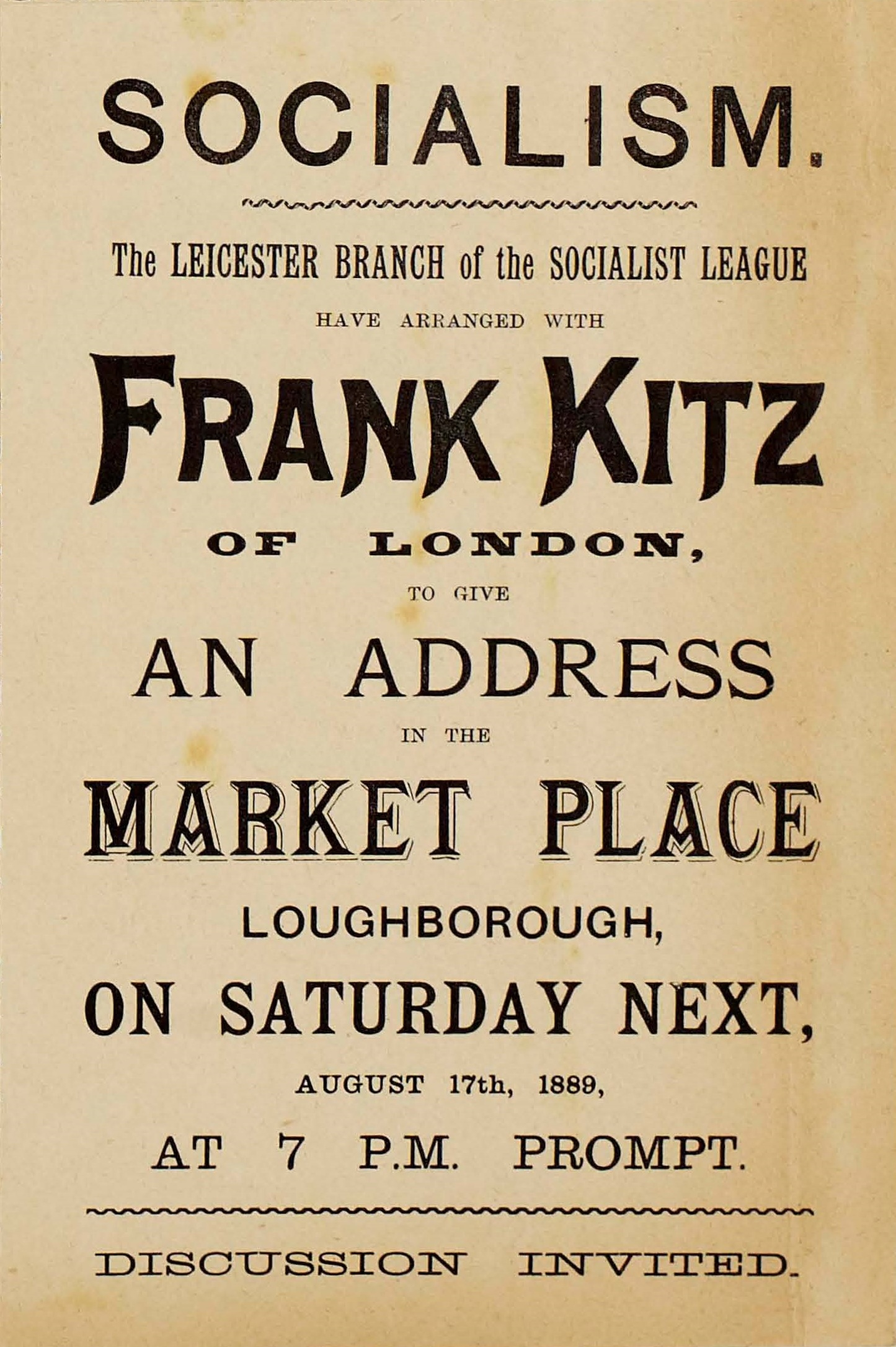
Poster for a talk by Kitz on socialism in Loughborough in 1889

In 1880, Kitz merged the Rose Street Club with Joseph Lane's Homerton Social Democratic Club. This was closed by police in 1882, by which time the two had founded the Labour Emancipation League (LEL), a libertarian socialist organisation, which merged into the Social Democratic Federation two years later. In the new organisation, he became associated with William Morris, working with him politically, while also sometimes working for him, using his skills in dyeing. Along with most other former members of the LEL, he joined Morris' Socialist League split in 1885. Kitz worked with Lane to develop a radical leftist grouping in the new party, and in 1888 they achieved a majority, Kitz becoming the league's secretary.

In the league's 1890 elections, Kitz was selected to replace Morris as editor of Commonweal, its journal. Morris then left the league, although Kitz retained a favourable opinion of him. Many other posts were won by anarchists supportive of violence, such as Charles Mowbray. Kitz disagreed with this, and resigned from the editorship in February 1891, when the league ceased national operations, instead associating himself with the Freedom group.

Kitz maintained a low profile for the next twenty years, working full-time as a dyer, although he remained supportive of anarchism. In 1909, he began public speaking on anarchist matters again, and wrote his memoirs, published by Freedom in a series entitled "Recollections and Reflections". As a result of this activity, he lost his job, and found himself again in poverty. In his last years, he survived from the old age pension, while Freedom organised two financial appeals for him. He died on 8 January 1923 at St James' Infirmary in Balham, London.

Party political offices
Preceded by William Morgan	Secretary of the Manhood Suffrage League; 1875–1877	Succeeded by Maltman Barry
Preceded by Fred Charles	Secretary of the Socialist League; 1888–1890	Succeeded by ?
Media offices
Preceded by Johann Most	Editor of Freiheit; 1881	Succeeded by Victor Dave
Preceded by William Morris	Editor of Commonweal; 1890–1891; With: David Nicoll	Succeeded by David Nicoll
