= Ambrose Barker =

19th-century British political activist

- Born: 10 April 1859; Earls Barton, Northamptonshire, England
- Died: 14 February 1953 (aged 93)
- Occupation: Schoolmaster
- Movement: Anarchism; Secularism
- Partner: Ella Twynam

Ambrose Barker (1859–1953) was a British anarchist activist.

== Bibliography ==
- Hawkes, Ken (2012) [1953]. "Obituary of Ambrose Barker". KSL: Bulletin of the Kate Sharpley Library (70–71). ISSN 1475-0309.
- Heath, Nick (2 March 2007). "Barker, Ambrose, 1859-1953". Libcom.org.
- Quail, John (2019) [1978]. "The Labour Emancipation League". The Slow Burning Fuse: The Lost History of the British Anarchists. Oakland: PM Press. pp. 32–39. ISBN 9781629635828. OCLC 1042080070.
- Meltzer, Albert (1995). "Lives Remembered: Ambrose Barker and Ella Twynan". KSL: Bulletin of the Kate Sharpley Library (5). ISSN 1475-0309.
