= Henry Alfred Barker =

Henry Alfred Barker (25 February 1858 – 12 January 1940) was a British socialist activist.

== Early life ==
Born in Shoreditch in the East End of London, Barker was educated at St John's School in Hoxton before following his father in becoming a builder.

In his late teens, Barker became interested in science and the social sciences. He attended classes at the Regent Street Polytechnic and some given by Edward Aveling for the National Secular Society, and spoke at street meetings on social reform issues.

== Political career ==
In about 1885, Barker joined the Hoxton Labour Emancipation League, an early socialist organisation which at the time had just split from the Social Democratic Federation and instead affiliated to the new Socialist League. Barker soon became secretary of the Socialist League's Hoxton branch, and in December 1886 was elected as the organisation's national secretary.

As secretary of the league, Barker organised fundraising efforts, such as a self-written play, "The Lamp". He also continued to speak in public, often chairing Socialist League events. By 1888, he was managing the party's newspaper, Commonweal, but he became disillusioned with the increasing prominence of anarchists in the organisation and resigned as secretary in May 1888.

While Barker remained a member of the Socialist League a little longer, and also a member of the Labour Emancipation League, he devoted most of his time to forming a new organisation, the Labour Union. An organising committee was established later in 1888, with Barker and John Lincoln Mahon as joint chairs, and the party was officially formed at the start of 1889.

Barker stood as a Labour Union candidate for Hoxton in the London County Council election, 1889, although he took only 169 votes. In June, he was a founder of the newspaper Police and Public; this soon became the Illustrated Weekly News, and Barker contributed articles on the proceedings of the new county council, but the paper closed by the end of the year. He returned to electoral politics as the agent for A. K. Donald when he stood in Hoxton at the 1892 general election, but Donald received only nineteen votes.

In 1893, the Labour Union dissolved itself into the new Independent Labour Party. Barker served on the party's initial, provisional executive and proposed that the new organisation named itself as the "Independent Labour Party of Great Britain and Ireland". The shortened version of this title was adopted.

Barker was secretary of the printing committee for the 1896 Congress of the Second International, held in London, working on this closely with Harry Quelch and Will Thorne.

During this period, Barker continued to work as a builder, and was active in the Amalgamated Society of House Decorators and Painters. He served on its executive committee until 1897, and stood unsuccessfully to become its general secretary in 1895. However, he was expelled in 1898 for refusing to pay a fine relating to spending the society's funds contrary to its rules.

From the turn of the century, Barker struggled with increasingly poor eyesight. He devoted much of his time to the Brotherhood Church in Islington, opposing World War I and organising lectures after the war by speakers including Ivan Maisky, Maude Royden and Shapurji Saklatvala.

Party political offices
Preceded by Henry Halliday Sparling	Secretary of the Socialist League; 1886–1888	Succeeded by Fred Charles
