= Thomas Fauset MacDonald =

Scottish physician and political activist (1862–1910)

Fauset MacDonald
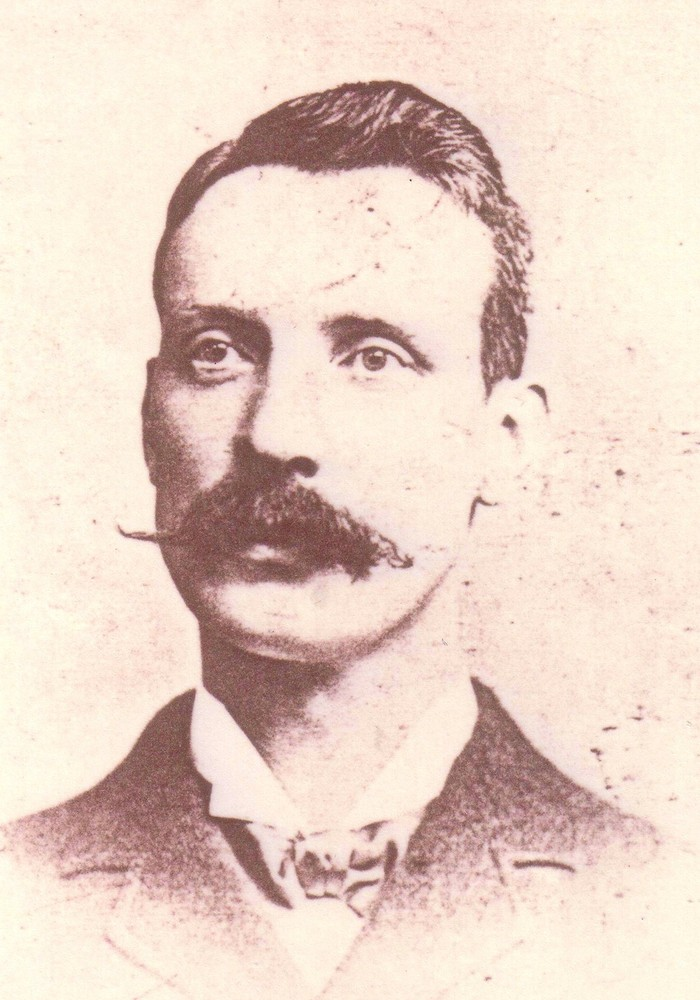
- Born: Thomas Fauset MacDonald; 12 May 1859; Maryhill, Glasgow, Scotland
- Died: 14 December 1910 (aged 51); San Pedro, Ivory Coast
- Education: University of Glasgow
- Occupations: Physician; Veterinarian; Political agitator

Thomas Fauset MacDonald (12 May 1859 – 14 December 1910) was a Scottish physician and veterinarian who was active in the British anarchist movement and later the Australian white supremacist and eugenics movements.

== Biography ==
MacDonald was born in 1859 to Jane (née Fauset) and William McDonald, a surgeon. He followed his father into medicine, studying at the University of Glasgow and graduating in 1882. He travelled to Australia and New Zealand and studied tropical diseases, returning to Scotland in 1889. In 1892 he was awarded a veterinary degree.

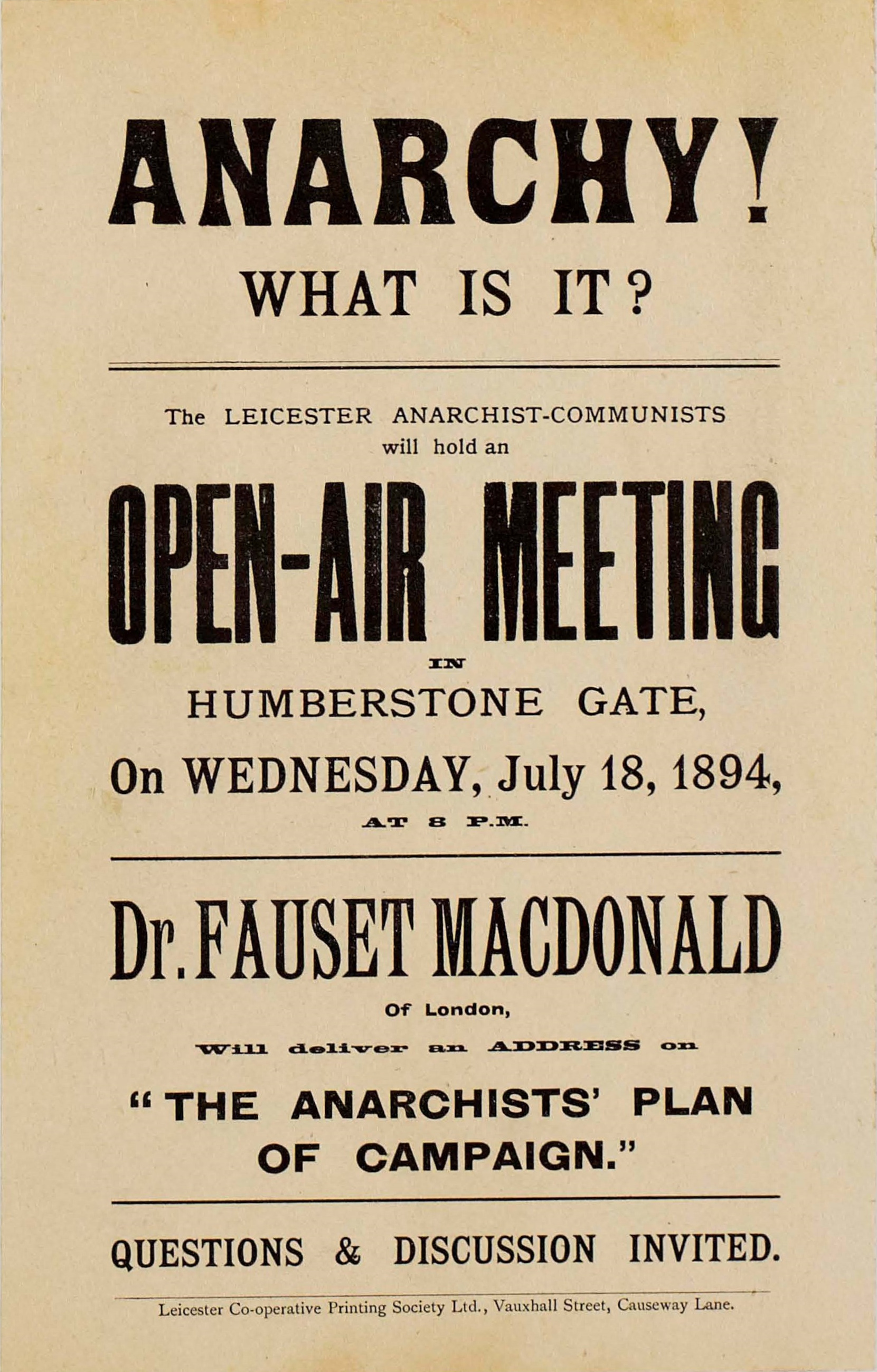
Poster advertising a talk by MacDonald in Leicester in 1894

In 1893, MacDonald began to take an active part in the anarchist movement in London, becoming a financial backer and for a time an unofficial editor of the Socialist League's newspaper Commonweal. At this time MacDonald also inspired the character Dr Armitage in Olivia Rossetti's semi-fictional novel A Girl Among the Anarchists. Former Commonweal editor David Nicoll publicly accused MacDonald of being a police spy and of supplying the sulphuric acid used to build the bomb which had killed Martial Bourdin in February 1894. Efforts were made unsuccessfully by Max Nettlau and Peter Kropotkin to have Nicoll withdraw the accusations.

In 1895, MacDonald moved to Queensland, Australia. In 1897, he was appointed Medical Officer to the Geraldton Hospital in North Queensland. In 1904, he set up a small private cottage hospital, Dr T. F. MacDonald's Bureau of Tropical Disease & Cottage Hospital.

Earlier, from 1903, he began advocating for white supremacy and eugenics, while occasionally still speaking on socialism and anarchism. In 1906 he moved to Wellington, New Zealand where he became active in the New Zealand Socialist Party, but was soon removed from the party. From 1906 to 1907, he was the Medical Officer for the Colonial Mutual Assurance Society for the Grey River district of the South Island. In 1907 he founded the White Race League in Wellington with himself as president, though his presidency was short-lived. He returned to England in October 1907.

He was back in Scotland by 1908, spending the summer at St Abb's, a small seaside village just north of Berwick, as a locum tenens. The life of the fisher-folk there and their struggle with the elements inspired him to write a book of verse which was published in 1909, titled North Sea Lyrics.

In 1910, he was offered the position of Principal Medical Officer of the Companie de Kong and moved to San Pedro, Ivory Coast of West Africa. In a letter to his sister, Marie, he said he regarded this position as one of the 'plums' of Tropical Medicine, with private practice thrown in!. He felt that he had achieved his goals - medical work which was his highest delight, and a position of authority on the Tropics and the White Races. Within months of his arrival, he died of yellow fever, aged 51, on 14 December.
