= Wedding of Prince George and Princess Victoria Mary =

1893 British royal wedding

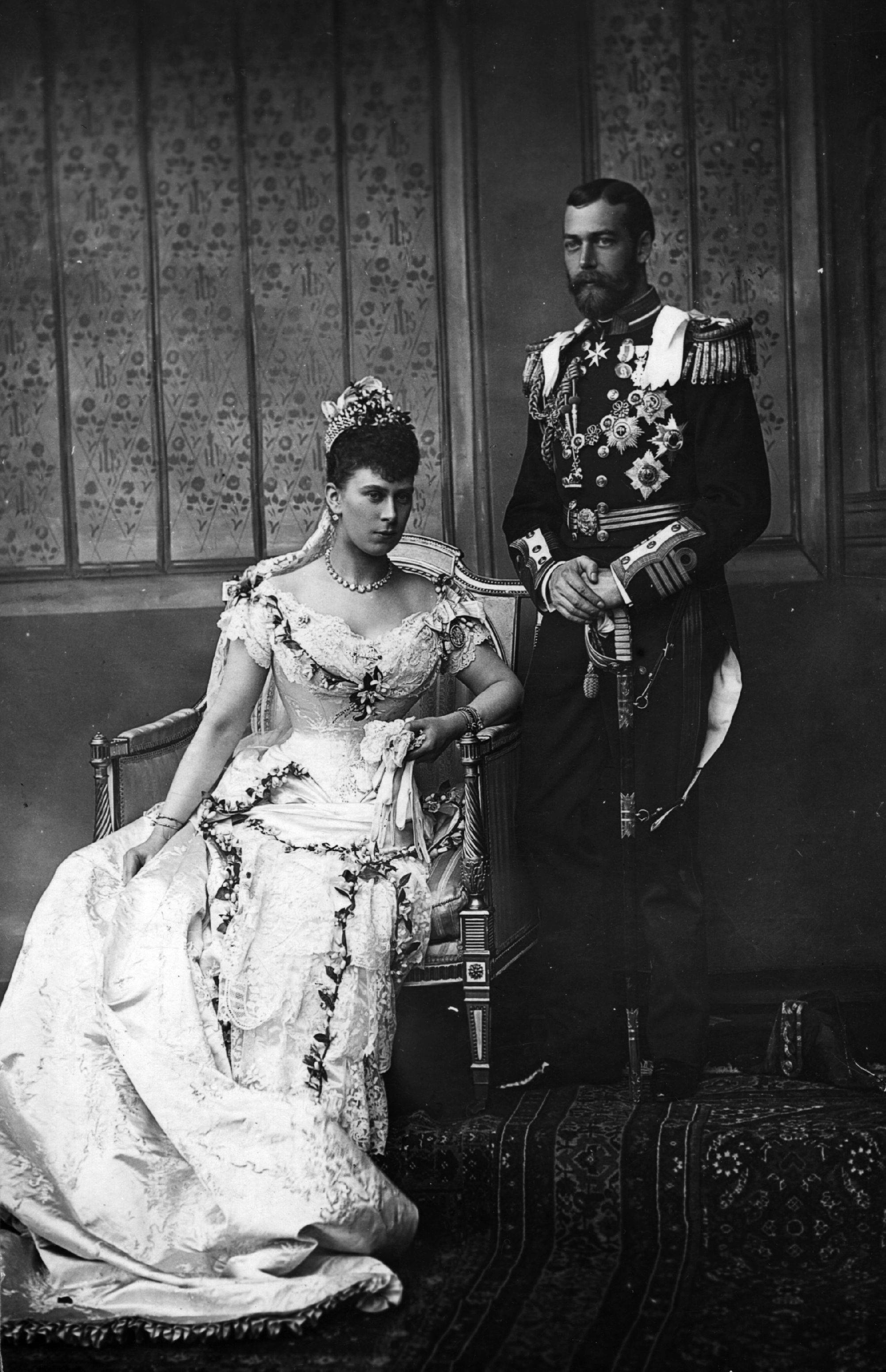
- Prince George and Princess Mary on their wedding day
- Date: 6 July 1893; 133 years ago
- Venue: Chapel Royal, St James's Palace
- Location: London, England
- Participants: Prince George, Duke of York (later King George V); Princess Victoria Mary of Teck (later Queen Mary)

On 6 July 1893, Prince George, Duke of York (later King George V), and Princess Victoria Mary of Teck (later Queen Mary) were married at the Chapel Royal, St James's Palace, in London, England. The marriage united two prominent members of the British royal family and followed the death of Prince George's elder brother, Prince Albert Victor, Duke of Clarence and Avondale, to whom Princess Victoria Mary had previously been engaged. Their wedding was attended by numerous European royals, reflecting the extensive dynastic connections of the late nineteenth century.

The union proved significant for the future of the British monarchy, as George later ascended the throne in 1910 upon the death of his father, King Edward VII, and Mary became queen consort. Their marriage produced six children, including Edward VIII and George VI, and helped shape the modern royal house during a period marked by constitutional change, the First World War, and shifting public expectations of the monarchy. Mary in particular became known for her strong sense of duty and support for the crown, contributing to the stability and continuity of the institution in the early twentieth century.

== Engagement ==
Princess Victoria Mary of Teck's engagement to Prince Albert Victor, Duke of Clarence and Avondale, eldest son of the Prince of Wales, ended with the duke's death on 14 January 1892. Even before the duke's death, his grandmother Queen Victoria had wanted to ensure the succession, and consequently desired that his younger brother and (now second-in-line to the throne) Prince George marry either Princess Marie or Princess Victoria Melita of Edinburgh. For his part, George was fond of his cousins, but did not want to marry early; "I still think marrying too young is a bad thing," he wrote to the Queen, and cited the circumstances surrounding the death of Rudolf, Crown Prince of Austria, as an example. Furthermore, the prince made it known, "The one thing I never could do is to marry a person that didn't care for me. I should be miserable for the rest of my life". In 1892 however, a tentative proposal of marriage was put forward to Marie's parents, but as she was influenced by her Anglophobe mother and governess, Marie rejected him.

His grandmother Queen Victoria was fond of the Duke of Clarence's fiancée, and made known her wish for Mary to wed his brother George (now the Duke of York). The situation was embarrassing for the couple, as the country expected their engagement and contemporary newspapers speculated wildly on the affair. Mary was still mourning the duke's death, but faced the intense pressure of her parents, among others. George on the other hand was faced with the reality of his new position as second-in-line to the throne, and had lost self-confidence after Marie's refusal. He had no idea what Mary's real opinion was towards him, and consequently had some misgivings; George was urged to propose to Mary after spending time with his beloved aunt Queen Olga of the Hellenes. Despite this background, the couple came to care deeply for each other, and their marriage would be a success.

Several awkward encounters with Prince George went by, always in the company of others, with both individuals remaining embarrassed and shy. On 3 May 1893, Mary arranged to have tea with George's sister Princess Louise, Duchess of Fife, and her husband, but when she arrived, she found George there as well. The awkward moment was saved after Louise interceded, "Now Georgie, don't you think you ought to take May into the garden to look at the frogs in the pond?" George proposed beside the pond, and their engagement was officially announced the following day.

== Protests ==
The Socialist League, an anarchist group, campaigned against the cost of the wedding, putting up posters which stated: "The London Anarchists will hold an indignation meeting Sunday, July 2nd, in Hyde Park, at half-past-three, to protest against the waste of wealth upon these Royal Vermin, while the workers are dying of hunger and overwork. Fellow workers, prepare for the Revolution. Remember - He who would be free himself must strike the blow. Down with Flunkyism." Thomas Cantwell and Ernest Young, members of the group, were caught flyposting and were arrested and held in prison. Their offices were searched, but the case was ultimately dismissed.

== Wedding ==
Combined coat of arms of George and Mary, the Duke and Duchess of York

Prince George, Duke of York, and Princess Victoria Mary of Teck were married at 12:30 on 6 July 1893 at the Chapel Royal at St James's Palace. Their wedding was the first royal wedding to take place in St James's Chapel since the death of Prince Albert in 1861, which plunged Queen Victoria into deep mourning. Most of Albert and Victoria's own children were married in St George's Chapel, Windsor Castle, in relative seclusion.

On the morning of their wedding, George accidentally caught sight of his fiancée down a long corridor of Buckingham Palace; he proceeded to make a "low and courtly bow," a gesture Mary never forgot.

The royal parties were brought from Buckingham Palace to St James's in four large carriage processions, consisting of open landaus. The first procession included members of the household; this was followed by the Duke of York and his supporters in the second and Princess Mary, the Duke of Teck and Prince Adolphus of Teck in the third. The final procession included Queen Victoria, the Duchess of Teck and Princes Frederick and Alexander of Teck. The first public royal wedding in 32 years drew large numbers of spectators, many of whom gathered in the route from Buckingham Palace to St James's Palace to give the couple an "enthusiastic reception". Mary greeted the crowds' applause with her "side-ways smile," and with "a little nervous gesture of her white-gloved right hand".

Princess Victoria Mary was attended by five bridesmaids and five junior bridesmaids: George's sisters Princesses Victoria and Maud of Wales; and his first cousins Princesses Victoria Melita, Alexandra, and Beatrice of Edinburgh; Princesses Margaret and Patricia of Connaught; Princesses Alice and Victoria Eugenie of Battenberg; and Princess Helena Victoria of Schleswig-Holstein. Each bridesmaid received a brooch from the groom. The Duke of York's two supporters were the Prince of Wales and the Duke of Edinburgh.

The Archbishop of Canterbury performed the ceremony, and was assisted by the Bishop of London, the Bishop of Rochester, and five other prelates. George and Mary then proceeded to Buckingham Palace, where Queen Victoria made a rare public appearance on the balcony along with the Duke and Duchess. The marriage register was signed by the Queen, the prime minister, and all other royal personages present. The three-tier wedding cake was adorned with fern, white roses, and nautical decorations.

Upon their marriage, Mary became styled as Her Royal Highness The Duchess of York. They spent their honeymoon at Sandringham, the Prince of Wales' estate in Norfolk, before going to Osborne House to stay with the Queen.

=== Wedding dress ===
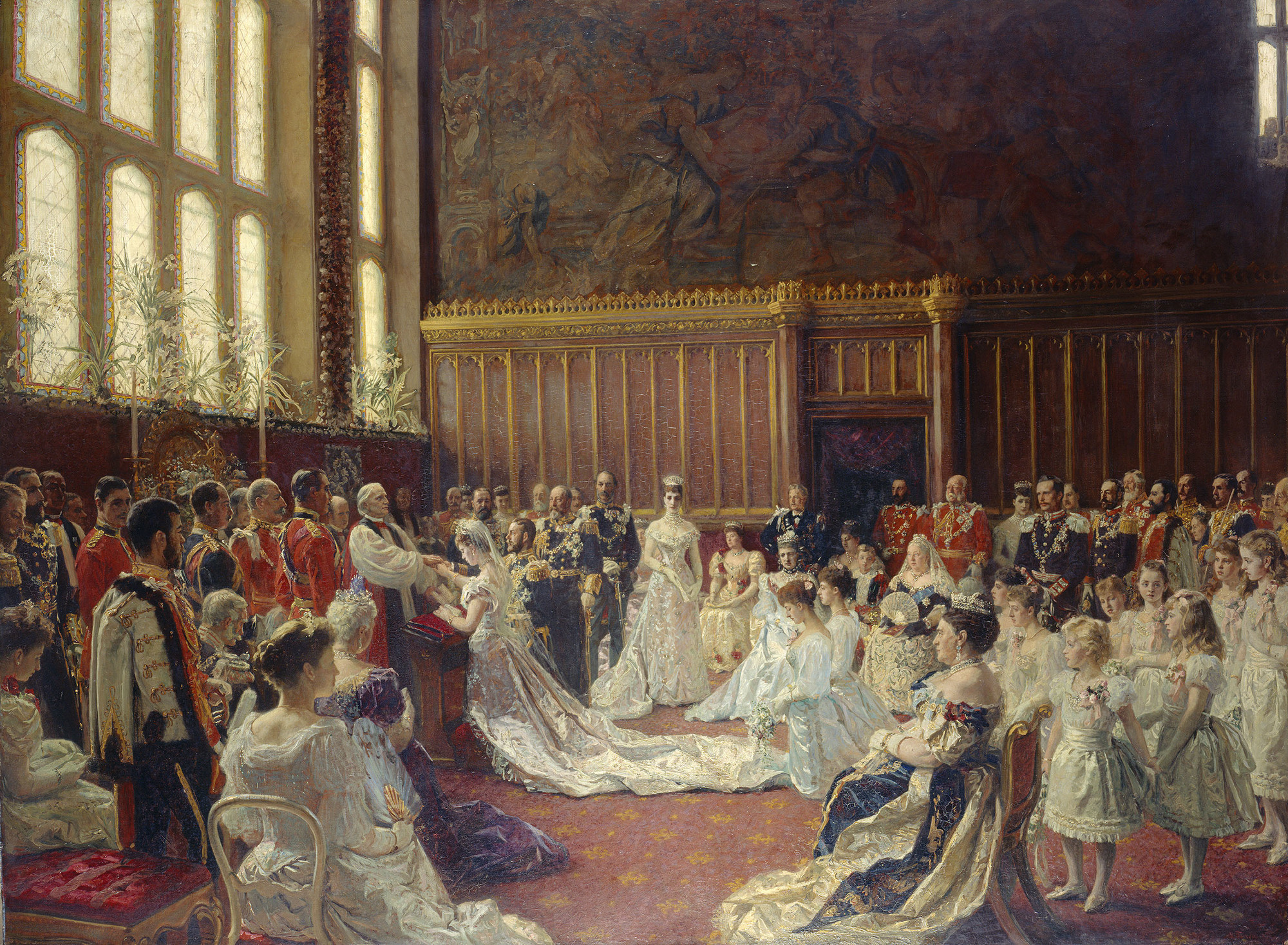
The Marriage of George, Duke of York, with Princess Mary of Teck by Danish artist Laurits Tuxen

Upon the announcement of the engagement, Arthur Silver of the Silver Studio, was approached to design the wedding dress. Silver had designed the dress for Princess Mary's intended wedding to the Duke of Clarence and Avondale, in 1892. This 'Lily of the Valley' creation had been made public just days before the Duke of Clarence's untimely death in January 1892 but had to be completely abandoned. The design chosen for the York-Teck wedding was 'The May Silks'; the dress would feature embroidery of the emblems of a rose, shamrock and thistle, and be trimmed with the traditional orange blossom and true lovers knots.

The dress itself was put together by Linton and Curtis of Albemarle Street, London. The front of the dress was made of white satin, featuring three small flounces old Honiton lace which had been used on the wedding dress of her mother. The bodice, cut at the throat, was long and pointed and was made of white and silver brocade, also featuring a small amount of her mother's Honiton lace near the top and on the upper part of the sleeve. The veil, previously used by her mother was fastened with diamond pins gifted by Queen Victoria. Matching the orange blossom elements to the dress, small wreaths were placed all the way around the bust and on the hair. Princess Mary completed the wedding outfit with a diamond tiara from Queen Victoria; diamond rivière necklace from the Prince and Princess of Wales; and diamond earrings and anchor brooch, a wedding gift from Prince George.

=== Gifts ===
Donations were made by gentlemen who bore the name George. A gift of the Badge of St. George was presented to the future King by Lord George Hamilton.

== Guests ==
=== Groom's family ===
- The Queen, the groom's paternal grandmother
  - The Prince and Princess of Wales, the groom's parents
    - Princess Louise, Duchess of Fife and the Duke of Fife, the groom's sister and brother-in-law
    - Princess Victoria of Wales, the groom's sister
    - Princess Maud of Wales, the groom's sister
  - The Empress Frederick, Queen Mother of Prussia's family:
    - (Kingdom of Prussia) Prince and Princess Henry of Prussia, the groom's first cousins (representing the German Emperor)
  - Grand Duchess Alice of Hesse and by Rhine's family:
    - Princess and Prince Louis of Battenberg, the groom's first cousin and her husband
      - Princess Alice of Battenberg, the groom's first cousin once removed
    - (Grand Duchy of Hesse) The Grand Duke of Hesse and by Rhine, the groom's first cousin
  - The Duke and Duchess of Edinburgh, the groom's paternal uncle and aunt
    - Princess Victoria Melita of Edinburgh, the groom's first cousin
    - Princess Alexandra of Edinburgh, the groom's first cousin
    - Princess Beatrice of Edinburgh, the groom's first cousin
  - Princess and Prince Christian of Schleswig-Holstein, the groom's paternal aunt and uncle
    - Prince Albert of Schleswig-Holstein, the groom's first cousin
    - Princess Helena Victoria of Schleswig-Holstein, the groom's first cousin
  - The Princess Louise, Marchioness of Lorne and Marquess of Lorne, the groom's paternal aunt and uncle
  - The Duke and Duchess of Connaught and Strathearn, the groom's paternal uncle and aunt
    - Princess Margaret of Connaught, the groom's first cousin
    - Prince Arthur of Connaught, the groom's first cousin
    - Princess Patricia of Connaught, the groom's first cousin
  - Princess and Prince Henry of Battenberg, the groom's paternal aunt and uncle
    - Prince Alexander of Battenberg, the groom's first cousin
    - Princess Victoria Eugenie of Battenberg, the groom's first cousin
- The King and Queen of Denmark, the groom's maternal grandparents
  - The Empress of All the Russias' family:
    - (Russian Empire) The Tsarevich of Russia, the groom's first cousin (representing the Emperor of Russia)
  - Prince Valdemar of Denmark, the groom's maternal uncle
- The Hereditary Prince of Hohenlohe-Langenburg, the groom's half-second cousin
- Prince Albert of Belgium, the groom's paternal second cousin, once removed (representing the King of the Belgians)
- Prince Philipp of Saxe-Coburg and Gotha, the groom's paternal second cousin, once removed (representing the Duke of Saxe-Coburg and Gotha)
- Countess Feodora Gleichen, the groom's second cousin
- Countess Valda Gleichen, the groom's half-second cousin
- Countess Helena Gleichen, the groom's half-second cousin
- Count Albert von Mensdorff-Pouilly-Dietrichstein, the groom's second cousin once removed

=== Bride's family ===
- The Duke and Duchess of Teck, the bride's parents
  - Prince Adolphus of Teck, the bride's brother
  - Prince Francis of Teck, the bride's brother
  - Prince Alexander of Teck, the bride's brother
- The Duke of Cambridge, the bride's maternal uncle
  - Col. George FitzGeorge, the bride's first cousin
  - Cap. and Mrs. Adolphus FitzGeorge, the bride's first cousin and his wife
  - Col. Augustus FitzGeorge, the bride's first cousin
- (Grand Duchy of Mecklenburg-Strelitz) The Grand Duchess and Grand Duke of Mecklenburg-Strelitz, the bride's maternal aunt and uncle

=== Other foreign royalty ===
- Prince and Princess Edward of Saxe-Weimar-Eisenach (representanting the Grand Duke of Saxe-Weimar-Eisenach)
- The Maharaja of Bhavnagar
- The Raja of Kapurthala
- The Thakur Sahib of Morbi
- The Thakur Sahib and Ranee Sahib of Gondal

=== Envoys and ambassadors ===
- (Kingdom of Württemberg) Count Ferdinand von Zeppelin (representing the King of Württemberg)
- (Russian Empire) HE the Russian Ambassador and Mme. de Staal
- (German Empire) HE the German Ambassador
- (Ottoman Empire) HE the Turkish Ambassador
- (Austria-Hungary) HE the Austro-Hungarian Ambassador and Countess Deym
- (Kingdom of Italy) HE the Italian Ambassador and Countess Tornielli
- (Spain) HE the Spanish Ambassador
- HE the United States Ambassador and Mrs. Bayard
- (Belgium) HE the Belgian Minister and Mme. Solvyns
- (Denmark) HE the Danish Minister and Mme. de Bille
- (Kingdom of Portugal) HE the Portuguese Minister
- (Kingdom of Romania) HE the Romanian Minister
- (Kingdom of Greece) The Greek Chargé d'Affaires and Mme. Romanos

=== Ministers ===
- Prime Minister and First Lord of the Treasury and Mrs. Gladstone
- The Lord Chancellor and Lady Herschell
- The Chancellor of the Exchequer and Lady Harcourt
- The Chief Commissioner of Works and Lady Constance Shaw-Lefevre
- The Lord President of the Council and Secretary of State for India and the Countess of Kimberley
- The Secretary of State for the Home Department
- The Secretary of State for Foreign Affairs
- The Secretary of State for War and Mrs. Campbell-Bannerman
- The First Lord of the Admiralty and the Countess Spencer
- The Secretary of State for Scotland and Lady Trevelyan
- The Chief Secretary for Ireland
- The Chancellor of the Duchy of Lancaster and Mrs. Bryce

=== Royal household ===
- The Marquess and Marchioness of Breadalbane, Lord Steward and his wife
- The Lord and Lady Carrington, Lord Chamberlain and his wife
- Sir Patrick Grant, Gold Stick-in-Waiting
- The Lord Vernon, Captain of the Honourable Corps of Gentlemen-at-Arms
- The Lord Kensington, Captain of the Yeomen of the Guard
- The Earl of Chesterfield, Treasurer of the Household
- George Leveson-Gower, Comptroller of the Household
- The Right Honourable Charles Spencer, Vice-Chamberlain of the Household
- John Clayton Cowell, Master of the Household
- The Lord Ribblesdale, Master of the Buckhounds
- The Dowager Duchess of Roxburghe, Acting Mistress of the Robes
- The Dowager Lady Churchill, Lady of the Bedchamber
- Lord Camoys, Lord-in-waiting
- Sir Albert Woods, Garter Principal King of Arms
- The Lord Suffield, Lord-in-Waiting to the Prince of Wales
- The Lord and Lady Colville of Culross, Chamberlain to the Princess of Wales, and his wife

=== Clergy ===
- The Archbishop of Canterbury
- The Bishop of London
- The Bishop of Rochester

=== Other guests ===
- The Duke of Norfolk, Earl Marshal
- The Duchess of Leeds
- The Duke and Duchess of Devonshire
- The Duke and Duchess of Rutland
- The Duke and Duchess of Buccleuch
- The Duke and Duchess of Argyll, father and stepmother of the groom's uncle by marriage
- The Duke and Duchess of Portland
- The Duke and Duchess of Abercorn
- The Marquess and Marchioness of Salisbury
- The Earl of Mount Edgcumbe
- The Earl and Countess of Lathom
- The Viscount and Viscountess Cross
- The Lord and Lady Halsbury
- Lord and Lady George Hamilton
- The Speaker of the House of Commons
- The Right Hon. George Goschen and Mrs. Goschen
- The Right Hon. Joseph Chamberlain and Mrs. Chamberlain
- The Right Hon. Arthur Balfour

== Sources ==
- Hichens, Mark (2006). Wives of the Kings of England, From Hanover to Windsor. London: Peter Owen Publishers. ISBN 0-7206-1271-3.
- Pope-Hennessy, James (1959). Queen Mary, 1867-1953. London: George Allen and Unwin Unlimited.
