= H. B. Samuels =

English anarchist

- Born: Henry Benjamin Samuels; March 1860; Kingston upon Hull, England
- Died: 1933 (aged 72–73)
- Occupation: Tailor
- Known for: Suspected police spy
- Movement: Anarchism
- Spouse: Mary Sullivan (m. 1879)

Henry Benjamin Samuels (March 1860 – 1933), known as Henry Benjamin and Harry Samuels, was a British anarchist who came under suspicion of being a police spy. Samuels was known for his incendiary rhetoric.

== Biography ==
Samuels was born in Kingston upon Hull and spent time in the United States. He moved to London in 1885, where he joined the Socialist League, and was involved in riots in the West End of London the following year.

Samuels gradually came to prominence in the Socialist League. In 1889, he was elected to its council, and represented the party at an anarchist congress in Paris. Later in the year, he spent time in Leeds, attempting to organise Jewish workers in the clothing trade.

David Nicoll, editor of the Socialist League's newspaper, Commonweal, was imprisoned in 1892. The following May, Samuels worked with Thomas Cantwell, Joseph Presburg, Carl Quinn, John Turner and Ernest Young to relaunch the paper, with funding from Max Nettlau and Fauset MacDonald. Samuels was appointed as its editor. In the role, he championed attacks on property, and saw every theft as a weakening of government authority. Samuels also called for attacks on employers, and praised a bombing at the Liceo Theatre in Barcelona, which killed thirty people. These writings prompted frequent public criticisms, including some made in the House of Commons, which Samuels reprinted in Commonweal, but Samuels was not arrested and no attempt was made to stop his activities.

Samuels' praise for indiscriminate violence led to increasing criticism from other anarchists. Nicoll, who had been released in September 1893, was a leading critic, claiming that Samuels was a spy for the police, or a puppet of one. From December 1893, Samuels began moderating his language, and he won re-election as editor of the Commonweal at the end of the month, defeating Nicoll. That month, he also attended a congress of the Scottish Labour Party, and was permitted to make a short speech. He was impressed by the organisation, and particularly by its leader, Keir Hardie.

Commonweal soon closed, and Samuels devoted his time to supporting unemployed workers. In 1895, he joined Hardie's new organisation, the Independent Labour Party, and he won election to its London Executive Committee.

Media offices
Preceded by Thomas Cantwell	Editor of Commonweal; 1893–1894	Succeeded by Publication closed
