= Henry Halliday Sparling =

British journalist and socialist (1860– 1924)

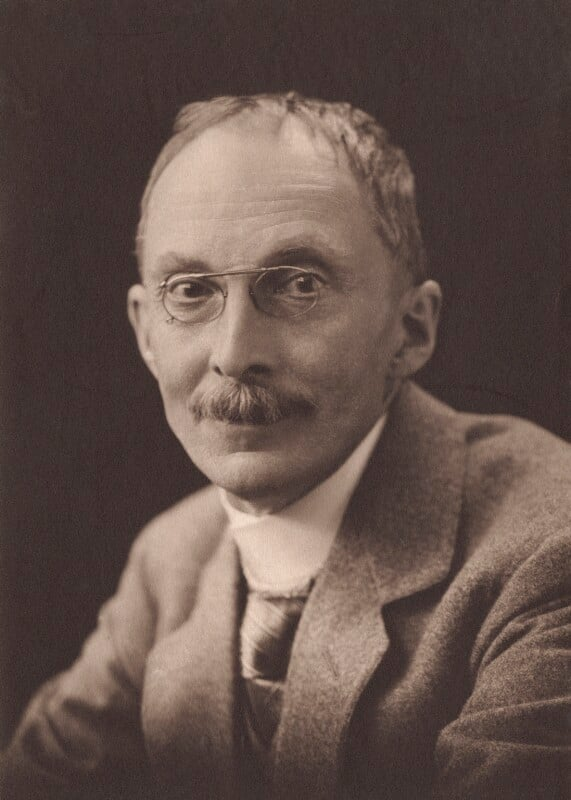
- 1919 platinotype by George Charles Beresford.
- Born: 1860
- Died: 9 September 1924 (aged 63–64)

Henry Halliday Sparling (1860 – 9 September 1924) was a British journalist and socialist activist.

Sparling became a socialist in 1878, and soon began lecturing on the topic. He began writing for Progress in 1884, and joined the Socialist League, serving on its executive, including a stint as secretary, and assisting William Morris with editing Commonweal from 1885 to 1890. He was married to Morris' daughter May between 1890 and 1898, when they were divorced.

Sparling disassociated himself from the Socialist League along with Morris, as it became dominated by anarchists, and instead found work as a sub-editor for the People's Press, moving to the Worker's Cry in 1891. That year, he joined the Fabian Society, and served on its executive from 1892 until 1894, during this period also writing the "Fabian Notes" column for the Workman's Times. In this period, he was also secretary to William Morris' Kelmscott Press, for whom he corrected Caxton's text of The History of Godefrey of Boloyne and of the Conquest of Iherusalem for the press.

In 1894, Sparling moved to Paris as a correspondent for the Weekly Times and Echo and also the Clarion, returning to London in 1910. He later moved to California, then returned to Paris in the early 1920s. In 1924, his book The Kelmscott Press and William Morris was published, and he died later in the year.

Party political offices
Preceded by John Lincoln Mahon	Secretary of the Socialist League; 1885–1886	Succeeded by Henry Alfred Barker
