= David Nicoll (anarchist) =

British anarchist (1859–1919)

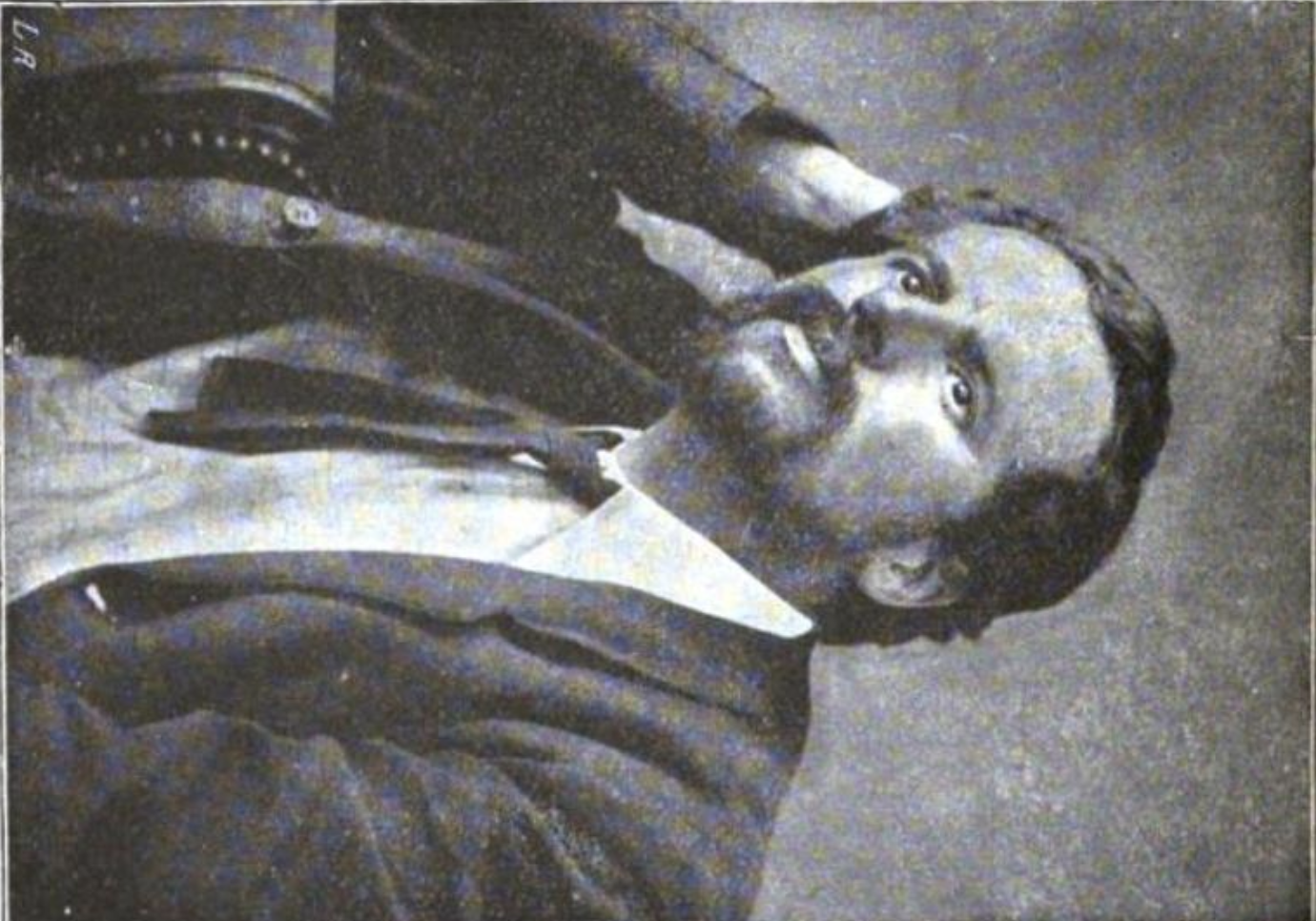
- Nicoll in 1901
- Born: David John Nicoll; 8 December 1859; Houndsditch, London, England
- Died: 2 March 1919 (aged 59); London, England
- Occupations: Writer; Editor; Poet; Speaker
- Movement: Anarchism
- Spouse: Elizabeth Mary Maslin

David John Nicoll (8 December 1859 – 2 March 1919) was a British anarchist newspaper editor, writer, poet and public speaker. Nicoll replaced William Morris as the editor of the Socialist League's newspaper Commonweal in 1890 until 1892 when Nicoll was imprisoned for incitement to murder a police inspector, a judge and the Home Secretary. Nicoll produced a series of pamphlets critical of the police and singling out those in the anarchist movement he believed to be police spies. Following his imprisonment Nicoll's mental health deteriorated and he died in poverty.

== Biography ==
Nicoll was born in Houndsditch in East London to a relatively wealthy family. His mother, Sarah (née Malpass) died while he was a child. His father, David Nicoll was a shoe factor and died in 1878. Nicoll spent his inheritance and became a journalist.

Nicoll was a member of the Social Democratic Federation, but In 1884 he joined the newly forming Socialist League becoming the League's librarian and propaganda secretary. He also began contributing articles and poetry to the League's newspaper Commonweal and gradually became an anarchist. In 1887 he was elected to the council of the Socialist League. In October 1887 Nicoll was violently attacked by a crowd of hundreds while trying to speak in Lowestoft with A J Houghton. Nicoll and Houghton had to be escorted away under police protection.

Differences within the League sharpened, particularly over the use of violence in the immediate struggle. At the 1890 annual conference of the Socialist League, William Morris was ousted as editor of Commonweal and was replaced by Nicoll and Frank Kitz with Charles Mowbray as publisher. Morris left the League later in the same year, but the removal of his moderating influence and substantial funding shook morale. There was also an increase in violent rhetoric in Commonweal under Nicoll's editorship, with him arguing that "Individual assaults on the system will lead to riots, riots to revolts, revolts to insurrection, insurrection to revolution."

=== Commonweal trial ===
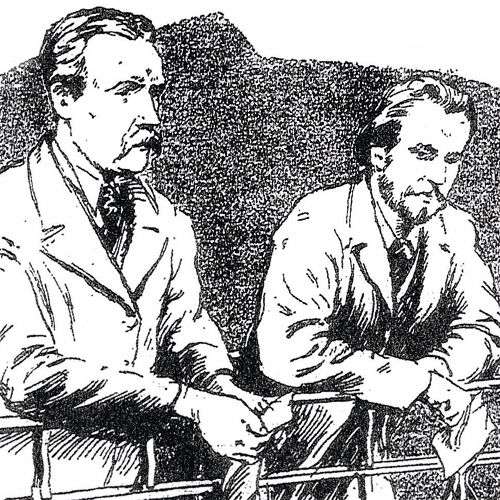
Mowbray and Nicoll in court

From 1892 Nicoll used his platform to take a leading role in supporting the defence of the Walsall anarchists – a group charged with manufacturing explosives. Nicoll published the pamphlet The Walsall Anarchists in which he argued that they had been framed by the French anarchist Auguste Coulon who Nicoll accused of being a paid agent-provocateur working for Inspector William Melville at Special Branch.

In an article in Commonweal in April 1892 Nicoll criticised Justice Henry Hawkins, who had presided over the Walsall anarchist trial, and asked whether Hawkins, the Home Secretary Henry Matthews or Melville were "fit to live". Nicoll and Commonweal's publisher Charles Mowbray were arrested for incitement to murder Matthews, Hawkins and Melville. Nicoll denied he intended to incite murder, stating that the article had been written in "hot blood". The prosecutor in the trial was the Attorney General Sir Richard Webster, while Nicoll chose to defend himself, later publishing his closing speech as a pamphlet. On 6 May 1892 Nicoll was sentenced to 18 months imprisonment with hard labour. Mowbray was found not guilty on the same charges on the basis that he was not involved in producing the paper at that time.

Research published in 2004 confirmed Nicoll's accusations that the Walsall anarchists were framed. Coulon had indeed been an agent-provocateur working under the direct orders of Melville.

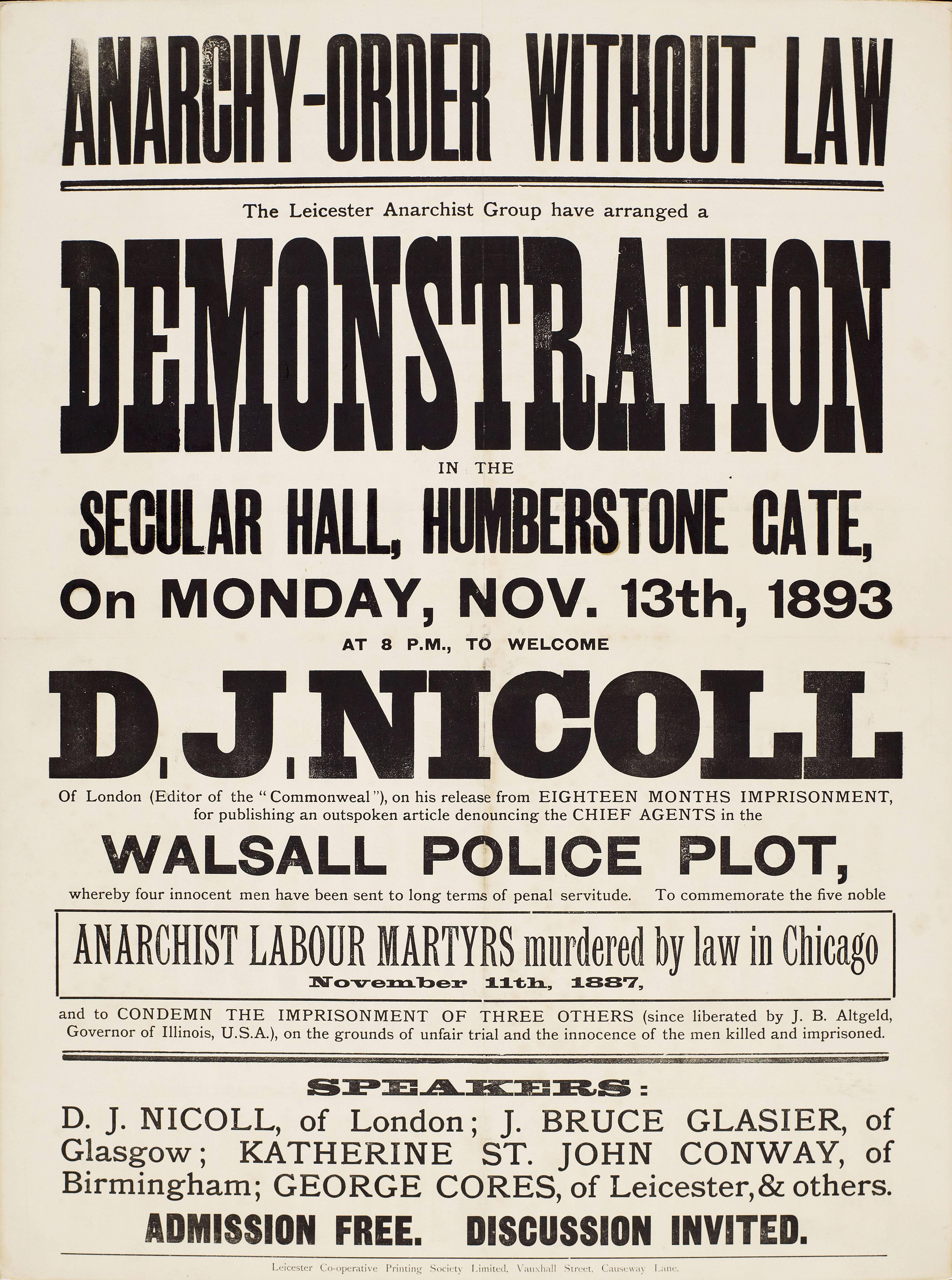
Poster from 1893 publicising a demonstration to welcome Nicoll on his release from prison

Nicoll served his sentence at Chelmsford prison, some of which was spent under medical supervision. He later spoke publicly about his experiences in prison and wrote the pamphlet Life in English Prisons. Upon his release he was met in London by a large welcoming party which resulted in clashes with the police.

In Nicoll's absence the anarchist tailor H. B. Samuels took over as editor of Commonweal. However, after Nicoll's release the Commonweal group did not return the editorship of the paper to Nicoll. Under Samuels's and Frank Kitz's editorship the paper fell into decline and ceased publication. The experience of prison and his removal from the paper caused Nicoll significant anguish and his mental health declined significantly as he became beset by paranoia.

The trial also demonstrated the level of visible and undercover police surveillance Nicoll and others at the paper were under, with police watching the office, following individuals, studying the paper, and attending talks and meetings – with some of the notes taken being used as evidence in court.

=== Later life ===
Nicoll became more socially isolated. From 1894 until 1897 he edited the Anarchist newspaper while living in Sheffield. He also began intermittently self-publishing a paper under the name Commonweal from 1896 to 1901.

In 1897 Nicoll authored and self-published the pamphlet The Greenwich Mystery: Letters from the Dead about the death of Martial Bourdin, in which he accused Samuels of being a police spy. The pamphlet is believed to have heavily influenced Joseph Conrad's novel The Secret Agent and Olivia Rossetti Agresti's fictionalised memoir A Girl Among the Anarchists (written under the pen name Isabel Meredith).

Nicoll spent the rest of his life in poverty, suffering poor mental health, working as a street vendor and selling pamphlets. He died on 2 March 1919 in St Pancras Hospital, London, and was buried in an unmarked grave in St Pancras and Islington Cemetery.

== Pamphlets ==
- Nicoll, David (1891). Stanley's Exploits, or Civilising Africa. Aberdeen: James Leatham.
- ——— (1892). Police Spies and Informers: Anarchy at the Bar. London: David Nicoll.
- ——— (1892). The Walsall Anarchists. London: David Nicoll.
- ——— (c. 1895). Anarchy at the Bar. London: David Nicoll.
- ——— (1896). The Sheffield Outrages. Sheffield: David Nicoll.
- ——— (1897). The Ghosts of Chelmsford Gaol. Sheffield: David Nicoll.
- ——— (1897). The Greenwich Mystery: Letters from the Dead. London: David Nicoll.
- ——— (c. 1898). La Carmagnole. The Spirit of Revolt. London: D. Nicoll.
- ——— (n.d.). The Featherstone Massacre. Sheffield: David Nicoll.
- ——— (n.d.). Life In English Prisons. Sheffield: David Nicoll.
- ——— (n.d.). Justice in England. Sheffield: David Nicoll.

== Bibliography ==
- Aldred, Guy Alfred (1940). Dogmas Discarded: An Autobiography of Thought, 1886–1908 (Part 2). Glasgow: Strickland Press.
- Oliver, Hermia (2015). The International Anarchist Movement in Late Victorian London. London: Routledge. ISBN 978-1-138-89970-4. OCLC 895302779.
- Quail, John (2019). The Slow Burning Fuse: The Lost History of the British Aanarchists. PM Press and Freedom Press. ISBN 978-1-62963-633-7.

Media offices
Preceded by William Morris	Editor of Commonweal; 1890–1892; With: Frank Kitz (1890–1891)	Succeeded by Thomas Cantwell
