= Labour Union (disambiguation) =

A labour union, or trade union, is an organisation of workers.

Labour Union may also refer to:

- Labour Union (Poland) or UP, a minor social-democratic political party in Poland
- Labour Union (UK), a small socialist political party in the United Kingdom from 1889 to 1893
- Trade Union and Labour Party Liaison Organisation also known as Labour Unions, a labour organisation in the United Kingdom
