= Hoxton (London County Council constituency) =

London County Council constituency

- Former constituency for the London County Council

Former constituency
- Created: 1889
- Abolished: 1919
- Member(s): 2
- Replaced by: Shoreditch

Hoxton was a constituency used for elections to the London County Council between 1889 and 1919. The seat shared boundaries with the UK Parliament constituency of the same name.

== Councillors ==
Year	Name	Party	Name	Party
1889	Edward Austin	Progressive	Nathan Moss	Progressive
1892	Henry Ward	Progressive	Nathan Moss	Progressive
1898	Henry Ward	Progressive	Henry Taylor Sawell	Progressive
1901	Henry Ward	Progressive	Edward Austin	Progressive
1904	Henry Ward	Progressive	Graham Wallas	Progressive
1907	John Davies	Municipal Reform	Ernest Gray	Municipal Reform
1910	Benjamin Evans	Progressive	Stanley Holmes	Progressive
1913	Oswald Lewis	Progressive	Stanley Holmes	Progressive

== Election results ==
1889 London County Council election: Hoxton
Party	Candidate	Votes	%	±%
Progressive	Edward Austin	1,901		
Progressive	Nathan Moss	1,703		
Independent	Edward Thomas Holloway	1,319		
Independent	William Beasley	844		
Labour Union	Henry Alfred Barker	169		
Independent	Frederick James Genge	142		
Progressive win (new seat)				
Progressive win (new seat)				

1892 London County Council election: Hoxton
Party	Candidate	Votes	%	±%
Progressive	Nathan Moss	2,258		
Progressive	Henry Ward	2,205		
Moderate	Edward Thomas Holloway	1,244		
Progressive hold		Swing		
Progressive hold		Swing		

1895 London County Council election: Hoxton
Party	Candidate	Votes	%	±%
Progressive	Henry Ward	2,049		
Progressive	Nathan Moss	2,027		
Moderate	W. Thompson	1,191		
Moderate	G. Wood	1,164		
Progressive hold		Swing		
Progressive hold		Swing		

1898 London County Council election: Hoxton
Party	Candidate	Votes	%	±%
Progressive	Henry Ward	2,179		
Progressive	Henry Taylor Sawell	2,157		
Moderate	A. Arter	1,567		
Moderate	T. W. Shaw	1,545		
Progressive hold		Swing		
Progressive hold		Swing		

1901 London County Council election: Hoxton
Party	Candidate	Votes	%	±%
Progressive	Edward Austin	2,379	28.2	−0.8
Progressive	Henry Ward	2,365	28.0	−1.3
Conservative	John Davies	1,878	22.2	+1.2
Conservative	Henry Bird	1,827	21.6	+0.9
Progressive hold		Swing		
Progressive hold		Swing	-1.0	

1904 London County Council election: Hoxton
Party	Candidate	Votes	%	±%
Progressive	Henry Ward	2,436		
Progressive	Graham Wallas	2,361		
Conservative	J. D. Davies	2,281		
Conservative	E. Gates	2,124		
Progressive hold		Swing		
Progressive hold		Swing		

1907 London County Council election: Hoxton
Party	Candidate	Votes	%	±%
Municipal Reform	John Davies	3,272		
Municipal Reform	Ernest Gray	3,226		
Progressive	Henry Ward	3,112		
Progressive	Graham Wallas	3,065		
Majority		160		
Municipal Reform gain from Progressive		Swing		
Municipal Reform gain from Progressive		Swing		

1910 London County Council election: Hoxton
Party	Candidate	Votes	%	±%
Progressive	Benjamin Evans	3,645		
Progressive	Stanley Holmes	3,612		
Municipal Reform	C. Ford	1,944		
Municipal Reform	Cecil Trotter	1,922		
Majority				
Progressive gain from Municipal Reform		Swing		
Progressive gain from Municipal Reform		Swing		

1913 London County Council election: Hoxton
Party	Candidate	Votes	%	±%
Progressive	Stanley Holmes	2,749		
Progressive	Oswald Lewis	2,693		
Municipal Reform	Henry Busby Bird	2,402		
Municipal Reform	C. Filby	2,279		
Independent Municipal Reform	Miss Willoughby	158		
Majority				
Progressive hold		Swing		
Progressive hold		Swing		
