= Leeds Trades Council =

Organization in Leeds, England

Leeds Trades Council is an organisation bringing together trade unionists in Leeds, in northern England.

== History ==
The council was founded in 1860, and remained small during its first decade, largely consisting of a few local unions. In 1871, the National Association for the Promotion of Social Science held a conference in the town, and a speaker at the event denounced trade unionism. The trades council wrote an address in response to this, and then called a national conference on 2 December, chaired by its president, E. C. Denton. This marked the start of greater prominence for the council, which over the following decade attracted the affiliations of local branches of the national unions.

During the 1880s, the council was dominated by supporters of the Liberal Party, including William Bune, Owen Connellan, John Judge, William Marston and Henry Maundrill. In 1887, it unanimously opposed the campaign for the Eight Hour Bill, describing it as Parliamentary "interference" in trade matters.

Towards the end of the 1880s, the union began helping un-organised workers unionise, including women tailors, and launched recruitment campaigns for the Amalgamated Jewish Tailors, Machinists and Pressers and the Huddersfield and District Power Loom Weavers' Association. Following the emergence of general unions in 1889, it admitted the National Association of Builders' Labourers and the National Union of Gas Workers and General Labourers, and also campaigned to unionise the city' tramway workers. In 1890, the council formed a joint board of conciliation with the local Chamber of Commerce. This was a period of rapid growth, with affiliated membership of the trades council quadrupling between 1886 and 1892.

By 1889, Judge was encouraging the council to stand candidates for Leeds Town Council through the Labour Electoral League, but there was initially little interest. However, the Liberal Party's refusal to select any workers as candidates for the 1890 local elections led the trades council to put together a programme which they asked all candidates to support. At the 1891 elections, Judge initially stood in North ward, but withdrew as the Liberal candidate accepted the trades council programme. Bune in West Hunslet and John Leach in Holbeck were not adopted by the Liberal Party, and so withdrew, but were replaced by John Childerson and Maundrill respectively, both of whom stood as independent trades council candidates, and were defeated by the official Liberal Party candidates. John Lincoln Mahon of the Gas Workers stood as an independent labour candidate in the School Board election, against the trades council's opposition, and was ejected from one of the council's meetings. In opposition to Mahon, Judge proposed excluding "professional agitators" from the council, but was defeated.

The Gas Workers withdrew from the trades council in protest at the treatment of Mahon, but Judge led the trades council in trying to get the union to remove Mahon from its leadership, claiming that he drank too much. This was unsuccessful, and Mahon was readmitted to the trades council, with a compromise that the Leeds Trades and Labour Council Electoral Union was founded, with trades council support. This was to stand trade unionists for political office, with or without Liberal Party support. Initially, it put forward G. Solley of the General Railway Workers' Union as a candidate for Leeds South at the 1892 UK general election, but the leadership of the trades council then withdrew backing for him. Mahon took over the candidature, facing strong opposition from the trades council, which organised heckling at his meetings. His nomination papers proved invalid, so he did not ultimately stand, and the Electoral Union was soon dissolved. In its place, Mahon, Tom Maguire and Alf Mattison established the Leeds Independent Labour Party. This became part of the Independent Labour Party, but did not see any success in local elections, whereas Connellan and Marston won election as Liberal-Labour candidates.

In the late 1880s, several smaller towns near Leeds established their own trades councils. In 1891, J. Sweeney of the Leeds Trades Council proposed the formation of the Yorkshire Federation of Trades Councils, which came about in 1893. Initially led by Ben Turner, its founding members were the trades councils of Bradford, Brighouse, Castleford, Doncaster, Huddersfield, Leeds, Mexborough, Morley, Shipley, Spen Valley, Wakefield and York.

The council affiliated to the Labour Representation Committee (LRC) in 1900, against the wishes of Connellan, who attempted to resign as secretary, but was persuaded to remain in post. At the 1900 UK general election, it sponsored William Pollard Byles as an LRC candidate in Leeds East, though he could take only third place. By 1903, labour candidates were instead being co-ordinated by a Leeds LRC, which worked closely with the trades council.

In January 1914, around 300 tenants living in the Burley area of Leeds went on rent strike against a 6d increase in rents imposed by the landlords. A week later, the Leeds Trades Council hosted a Labour conference intended to organise mass rent resistance, and this formed a Tenants' Defence League. After eight weeks the strike ended in defeat; committee members were evicted and blacklisted from renting any other home in the area.

In 1926, the Trades Union Congress set up the Trades Councils Joint Consultative Committee, with six members elected by trades councils. The secretary of Leeds Trades Council was generally one of the six.

The trades council has remained active and is now known as the Leeds Trades Union Council.

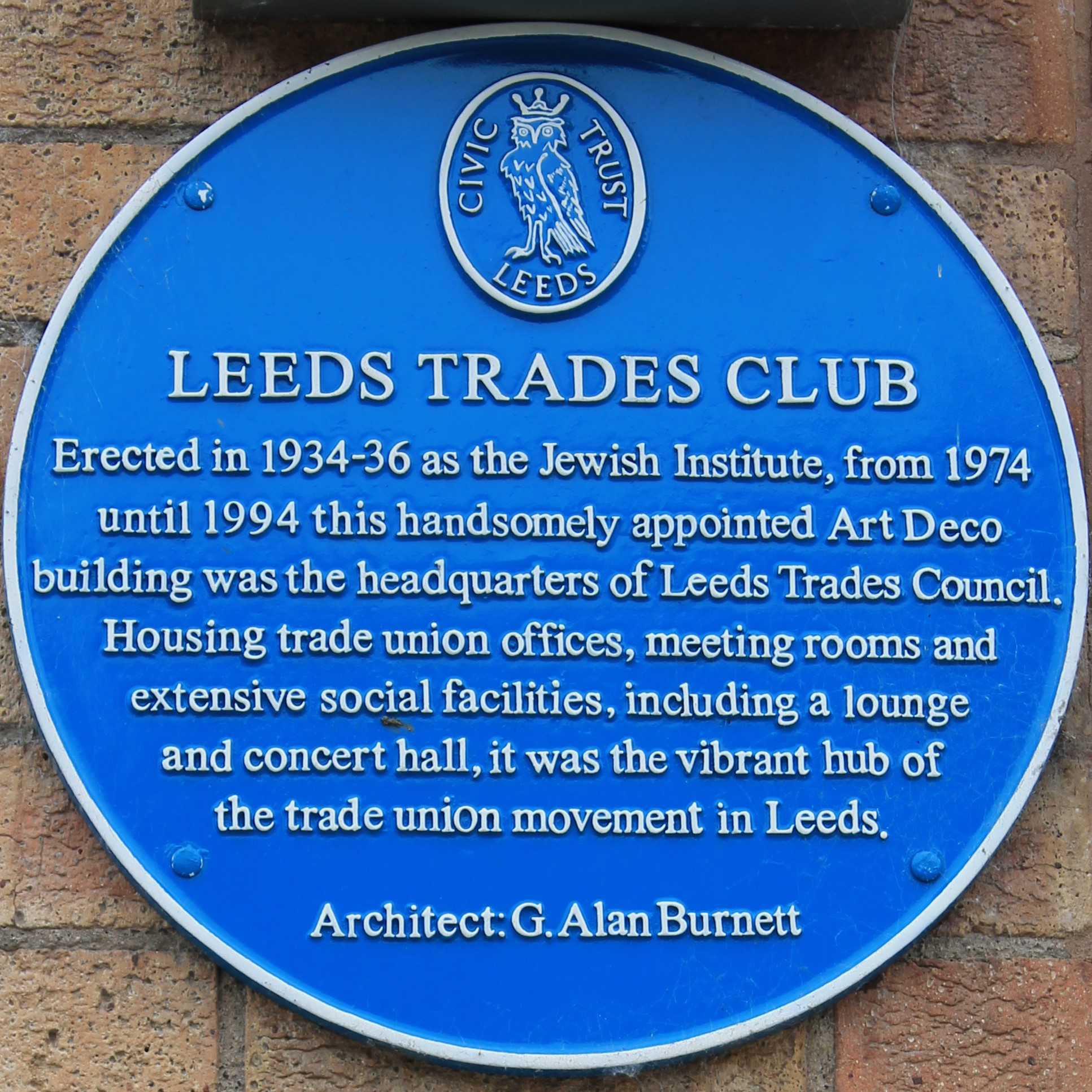
Leeds Trades Club blue plaque

== General Secretaries ==
1867: Thomas Alderson The Beehive 13 July 1867
1868: Thomas Alderson
1869 E C Denton
1870s: T. Plackett
1870s: J. W. Whittaker
1877: John Hudson
1892: Owen Connellan
1920s: John Brotherton
1940s: Ernest Kavanagh
1966: Beryl Huffinley
1984: Linda Vaughn
1980s: Ian McDonald
2010s: Joel Heyes
2015-2016: Dave Williams
2017: Warren Smith
2018: Brian Mulvey
2019-21: Tanis Belsham-Wray
2021-23: Pauline Bailey

== Presidents ==
1868: E C Denton
1870 E C Denton
1873: William Lishman
1877: James Pearson
1897: Arthur Shaw
1984: Ken Smith
2010s: Sheila Banks
2015-present: Jane Aitchison
