= Labour Union (UK) =

Defunct socialist party in the United Kingdom

- Secretary: H. A. Barker and A. K. Donald
- Founded: 1889
- Dissolved: 1893
- Succeeded by: Independent Labour Party
- Ideology: Socialism
- Political position: Left-wing

The Labour Union was a small socialist political party based in London.

The organisation was formed with the aim of bringing together workers who supported neither the Liberal Party nor the Conservative Party. An organising committee was established in 1888, chaired jointly by John Lincoln Mahon and Henry Alfred Barker, while Thomas Binning was its treasurer, and other members included Robert Banner and Alexander K. Donald. The large majority of its founders had recently left the Socialist League in opposition to the growing anarchist influence in that organisation, while a minority still held membership of the League. While much of its membership was in London, initially it attempted to establish provincial branches, with Tom Maguire and Fred Pickles joining in Bradford.

The party was formally established at the start of 1889, with a platform including Irish Home Rule, the nationalisation of key industries, an eight-hour working day, and Parliamentary reforms similar to those earlier proposed by the Chartists. It also called for the formation of a national independent party of labour. This was based an influential document by Mahon, entitled "A Labour Programme", which had been published in 1888 with a foreword by Robert Cunninghame-Graham. In August, the platform was revised to include Scottish and Welsh home rule. At this time, Mahon stood down as joint leader, with Donald and Barker becoming joint secretaries.

The organisation stood Barker as a candidate in the 1889 London County Council election in Hoxton, but he polled very poorly. Despite this, at the 1892 general election, it sponsored Donald as a candidate in Hoxton; he received only nineteen votes.

The party also attempted to organise trade unions, including one to represent coal porters, and one for postmen. Neither were successful, with many workers who had signed up for membership facing victimisation. An attempt to organise a strike among the postmen was particularly calamitous and, thereafter, the party undertook little activity.

In 1893, the Independent Labour Party (ILP) was established. The Labour Union responded enthusiastically, dissolving itself to form the core of the ILP's London branch.
