= Alf Mattison =

British politician (1868–1944)

Alf Mattison (1868–1944) was a socialist, local historian and photographer in Leeds and is known for his activity in the founding of the Independent Labour Party.

== Early life ==
Alf Mattison was born in Hunslet on 12 September 1868. He was one of 8 children, his father was a locomotive engineer and his mother worked in the textile trade. At 11 he started work in a wool mill, in his early teens he joined his father at Hunslet Engine Company as an apprentice engineer. His father died in 1890.

== Politics ==
Mattison was exposed to politics from an early age. At 9 he attended a demonstration on Hunslet Moor against the Middleton Railway infringing on common land and in 1881 he was injured by falling through railings when hearing Gladstone speak at Leeds Coloured Cloth Hall. During his time at the Hunslet Engine Company he was involved in a 7-month lockout.

He became politically active in his late teens, first joining the Social Democratic Federation in 1884. In 1886 he heard Tom Maguire speaking at Vicars Croft, later befriending Maguire and inspiring Mattison to split from the SDF and joining the newly formed Socialist League.

In 1890 he played an active role organising the Leeds Gasworkers strike against Leeds Liberal controlled council, marking a conflict with the Liberals over dominance in both the council and Trades Council. Two years later he helped to found a Leeds branch of the Independent Labour Party, and was a delegate at the party's inaugural national conference at Bradford in 1893. He remained a member of the party until his death, even after its disaffiliation from the Labour Party in 1932, but became less active in later life. He was also active in the Fabian Society and Labour Church.

His involvement in the ILP led to friendships with many notable Socialists of the time including Edward Carpenter, Philip Snowden, Ramsay MacDonald, Isabella Ford, John Lister and Charles Oates.

== Local History ==
Mattison was also a notable local historian, writing regular contributions to the Yorkshire Post and Leeds Weekly Citizen and known as a particular expert on Leeds Labour history and the history of theatre in Leeds.

In 1897 he started giving history talks in Hunslet and by 1905 was giving 35 lectures throughout the year. He held office on the Thoresby Society Council from 1908 until his death, during which time he was involved in a campaign for a commemorative plaque to caricaturist Phil May.

In 1908 he published "The Romance of Old Leeds" with Walter Deakin. The book contained photos of historical Leeds buildings by Mattison.

He kept his own notebooks and clippings, as well as collecting material on Socialist history, including leaflets and literature. In 1929 his collection was bought by Lord Brotherton to be housed at the University of Leeds Library for study. His notebooks were donated to Leeds Public Libraries after his death.

== Personal life ==
Mattison worked at the Hunslet Engine Company until 1906 when he became a clerk at Leeds City Tramways Department. He met Florence "Florrie" Foulds through the Labour Church and they married in 1902. He died on 9 September 1944 when he was knocked down by a tram on Chapeltown Road.
