= Thomas Cantwell =

British anarchist (1864–1906)

- Born: Thomas Edward Cantwell; 14 December 1864; London, England
- Died: 29 December 1906 (aged 42)
- Occupations: Compositor; Basket-maker; Newspaper editor
- Movement: Anarchism

Thomas Edward Cantwell (14 December 1864 – 29 December 1906) was a British anarchist activist.

== Biography ==
Born in the Pentonville Road area of London, Cantwell spent some time working as a basket-maker before entering the printing trade. Interested in anarchism, he joined the Socialist League in about 1886, and was elected to its council the following year. There, he was a prominent support of the anarcho-communist Joseph Lane.

The anarchist wing of the league became increasingly prominent, and from 1890, all the key posts were held by anarcho-communists. In 1892, David Nicoll, editor of its newspaper, Commonweal, was imprisoned, and Cantwell replaced him. He focused on producing revolutionary propaganda for the group. The following year, he was arrested for putting up posters calling for a protest against the wedding of Prince George, Duke of York, and Princess Mary of Teck, which stated that "He who would be free himself must strike the blow". Although he was held in prison for some time, charges were dismissed. The owner of one of the hoardings where Cantwell had placed a poster then sued him and his colleague, Young, and they were each fined two guineas.

In 1894, Cantwell spoke at a rally the day before the opening of Tower Bridge, arguing that the contribution of the workers who had built the bridge was not appropriately recognised. He was arrested, and his colleague C. T. Quinn was also arrested, after he went to the Police Court to ask about Cantwell. Both were charged with sedition; unfortunately for Cantwell, he had in his possession leaflets printed by the Necessity Group entitled "Why Vaillant threw the Bomb", so he was also charged with possession of manuscripts explaining the use of explosives. Cantwell denied advocating violence, but was found guilty and served six months in prison.

On release, Cantwell joined the anarchist Freedom Group, spending some time as an editor of its newspaper, Freedom. He worked as a compositor for anarchist publications, but suffered a stroke in 1902, and thereafter was in poor health, dying in 1906.

Media offices
Preceded by David Nicoll	Editor of Commonweal; 1892–1893	Succeeded by H. B. Samuels
