= Owen Connellan (politician) =

British politician and trade unionist

Owen Connellan (1856 – 8 September 1923) was a British politician and trade unionist.

Born in Bristol, Connellan became a compositor and joined the Typographical Association (TA). At aged 13, while working as a printer, he was convicted for theft for stealing 16 shillings, 3 pence from James Allen Francis in Penzance, Cornwall. He was sent Kingswood Reformatory near Bristol for five years.

He moved to Bradford, where in 1880 he became active in the local branch of the TA, and from 1886 to 1888 he was the union's national president. While in Bradford, he led a dispute between the union and the Bradford Observer relating to union recognition and the introduction of new technologies.

Connellan moved to Leeds in the early 1890s, and in 1892 he was elected as secretary of Leeds Trades Council. The following year, he was an early member of the Independent Labour Party (ILP), despite not being a socialist. He did not remain in the new party for long, and in 1895 he was elected to Leeds City Council in the East Ward as a Liberal-Labour politician, with the support of the Leeds Electoral Association and the local branch of the Irish National Federation. He hoped to stand in Leeds East in the 1900 UK general election, but was unable to attract the backing of the trades council, and the recently founded Labour Representation Committee (LRC) instead backed William Pollard Byles. Upset by this development, Connellan instead supported J. R. Maguire of the Liberal Party. He resigned as secretary of the trades council, although ultimately he was persuaded to remain in the post.

Against Connellan's wishes, the trades council affiliated to the LRC, and in 1901 he served as its delegate to the committee. He was elected to its National Executive Committee as its first trades council representative. This experience moved him towards a split from the Liberal Party and, though he was re-elected to the council as a Lib-Lab in 1903, in 1904 he decided that he would in future contest elections for Labour. He attempted to become the party's candidate for Leeds East at the 1906 UK general election, but his recent conversion to Labour did not impress the local party, which instead backed ILP member James O'Grady.

Although now less influential in local politics, Connellan remained active. In 1904, the Trades Union Congress was held in Leeds, and Connellan served as chair of the reception committee. He resigned his council seat that year, but won in New Wortley in 1906, serving until 1912, then back in the East ward from 1914. At the 1922 UK general election, he unsuccessfully contested Buckingham for the Labour Party.

Party political offices
Preceded by New position	Trades councils representative on the National Executive Committee of the Labour Representation Committee; 1901–1902	Succeeded by William Pickles
