= Jean d'Arras =

14th-century French writer

Jean d'Arras (fl. 1392–1394) was a 14th-century writer from Northern France about whom little is known.

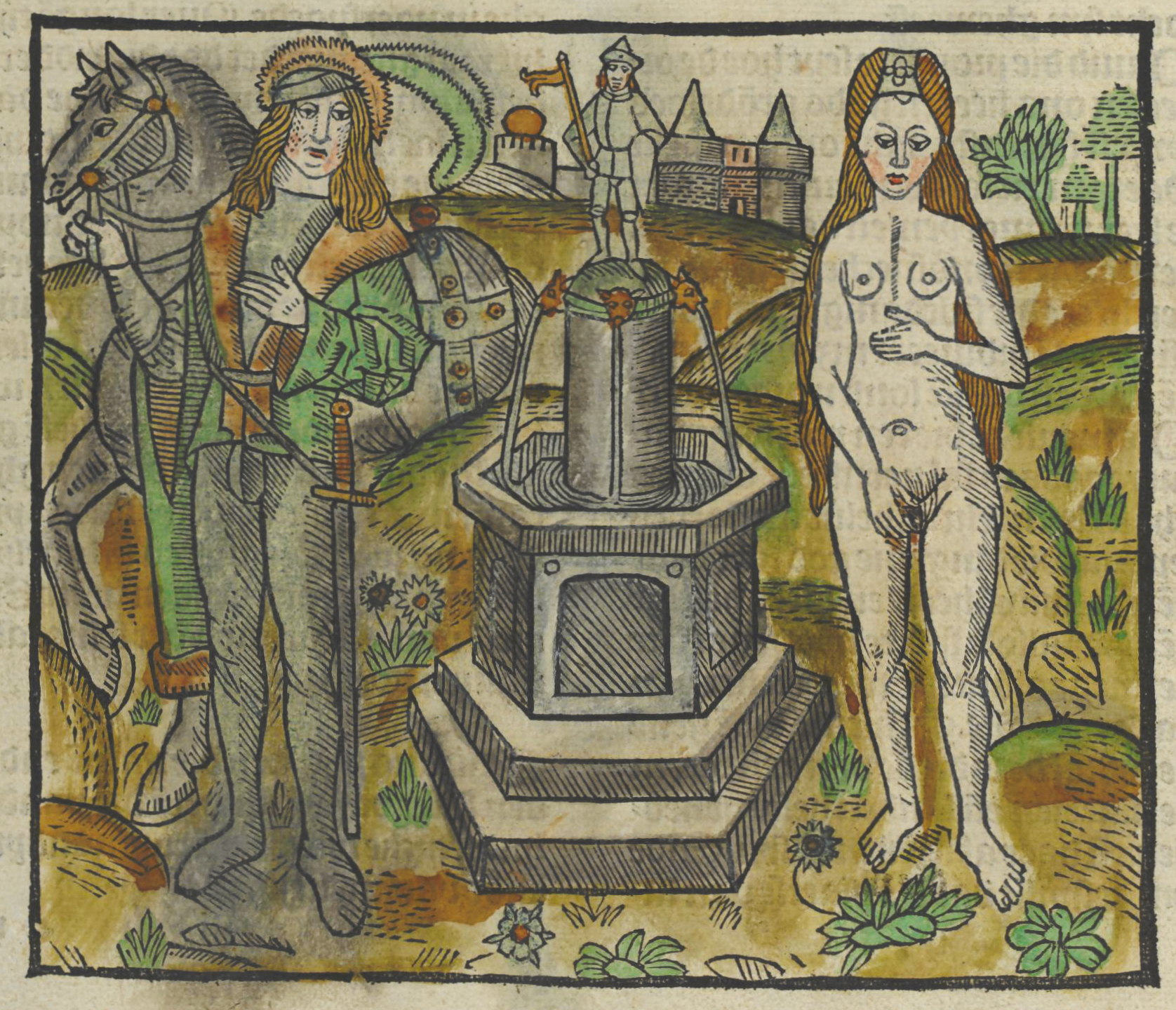

He collaborated with Antoine du Val and Fouquart de Cambrai in putting together a collection of stories entitled L'Évangile des quenouilles ("The spinners' gospel"). The frame story features a group of ladies at their spinning who relate the current theories on a great variety of subjects. The work is of considerable value for the light it throws on medieval manners, and for its echoes of folklore, sometimes deeply buried under layers of Christian tradition.

There were many editions of this book in the 15th and 16th centuries, one of which was printed by the early printer Wynkyn de Worde in English, as The Gospelles of Dystaves. A more modern edition (Collection Jannet) had a preface by Anatole France.

== The Roman de Mélusine ==
Jean d'Arras, perhaps the same, wrote at the request of John, duke of Berry, as he says in his introduction, a long prose romance variously called the Roman de Mélusine or the Chronique de Melusine part of Le Noble Hystoire de Lusignan ("The Noble History of the Lusignans"), in 1392-94. He dedicated the work to Marie of Valois, Duchess of Bar and expressed the hope that it would aid in the political education of her children.

Leaning on perhaps mostly oral tradition surrounding the originally Celtic region of Poitou, it is one of the first literary versions of the tale of Melusine, a fairy cursed by her fairy mother to become a hybrid woman/serpent every Saturday. If she married a mortal man who remained faithful to her and obeyed her request never to seek her out on that day, she would gain the status of a mortal woman and enjoy salvation as a Christian. She guided the spectacular rise and subsequent fall of the House of Lusignan after she met the nobleman Rainmondin by a fountain in the forest, who married her and fathered ten sons on her whose exploits in the Crusades brought them fame, despite the fact that most of them carried some form of physical blemish. Raimondin remains faithful to his promise until he is persuaded to believe that her hiding every Saturday is an excuse for her to entertain a lover, and he spies on her in her bath. He doesn't betray her secret until one of their most deformed sons, Geoffrey Big-Tooth, burns down the monastery his brother Fromont has retired to. In despair, Raimondin curses her publicly for her demonic nature that has infected their sons, and she turns into a dragon and flies away, wailing.

== Bibliography ==
- Donald Maddox and Sara Sturm-Maddox, Melusine of Lusignan: founding fiction in late medieval France. A volume of essays on the Roman de Melusine. The Roman traces the powerful medieval dynasty of Lusignan from its founding in the city by the legendary Melusine, an enigmatic shape-shifting faery figure, through its glorious rise in Europe and in the Crusader kingdoms of the Eastern Mediterranean (see Guy of Lusignan, King of Cyprus), weaving together history and fiction, with elements of myth, folklore, and popular traditions fused with epic, Crusader narrative, knightly romance, and Christian doctrine, all to glorify and uphold the proprietary claims to Lusignan of the work's illustrious patron.
- Jean d'Arras, Mélusine, roman du XIVe siècle, ed. Louis Stouff. Dijon: Bernigaud & Privat, 1932. The standard edition of the medieval French text.
- Jean d'Arras, Melusine, ed. A. K. Donald. Early English Text Society. London: Kegal Paul, Trench, Trübner and co. Superseded edition of the original French, available at Archive.org here.
