= A. K. Donald =

Scottish barrister

Alexander Karley Donald (died by 1918) was a Scottish barrister active in the socialist movement. He joined the Socialist League in 1885. Along with other parliamentarians, he left the League to form the Bloomsbury Socialist Society in 1890.

In 1889, Donald was a founding member of the Labour Union, becoming in August its joint secretary. At the 1892 UK general election, he stood for the party in Hoxton, but he took only 19 votes. He attended the founding conference of the Independent Labour Party in 1893, where he argued that its National Administrative Council should not meet monthly as that would be too expensive. He retired from political activity by 1898.

He also worked for the Early English Text Society as an editor. He edited the publication of a historic English translation of Melusine by Jean d'Arras.
