= Claude Hay (politician) =

British politician

The Honourable Claude George Drummond Hay (24 June 1862 – 24 October 1920) was a British businessman and Conservative Party politician.

The fifth son of George Hay-Drummond, 12th Earl of Kinnoull and Lady Emily Blanche Charlotte Somerset, he was educated at Radley College and on the European Continent. He entered business as a member of the stockbroker company of Ransford & Co in London, and became a director of the Fine Arts & General Insurance Co.

He became active in Unionist politics and was first secretary of the Primrose League. He unsuccessfully contested the 1892 and 1895 general elections as the Conservative candidate in the east London constituency of Shoreditch, Hoxton. On his third attempt in 1900 he was elected Member of Parliament (MP) for Hoxton, defeating the sitting Liberal Party member, Professor James Stuart. He held the seat in 1906, but lost the seat to Dr. Christopher Addison of the Liberals in January 1910. It was an ill-tempered campaign, and Hay took libel proceedings against a number of newspapers following his defeat. He chose not to make an attempt to regain the seat.

During World War I he was granted a temporary commission as a captain in Army Service Corps, subsequently transferring to the General Staff.

He died in Sevastopol in 1920 aged 58 while working as a special correspondent in southern Russia for The Daily Telegraph.

Parliament of the United Kingdom
Preceded by James Stuart	Member of Parliament for Shoreditch, Hoxton; January 1900 – January 1910	Succeeded by Christopher Addison
