= Bloomsbury Socialist Society =

- Founders: Edward Aveling; Eleanor Marx; A. K. Donald
- Founded: August 1888
- Dissolved: 1893
- Split from: Socialist League
- Merged into: Independent Labour Party
- Ideology: Marxism; Socialism
- Political position: Left-wing
- International affiliation: Second International

The Bloomsbury Socialist Society (BSS) was a socialist organisation, which broke away from the Socialist League in August 1888. Its meeting place was at the Communist Club, 49, Tottenham Street, Tottenham Court Road. At the third annual conference of the Socialist League held on 20 May 1888, the Anarchist wing of the league prevailed over the Marxist wing in their rejection of parliamentarianism. The BSS was founded in August 1888 by leading Marxists such as Edward Aveling, Eleanor Marx-Aveling, Frederick Lessner and A. K. Donald, with its first Honorary Secretary as W. W. Bartlett. In 1893 they participated in the founding of the Independent Labour Party (ILP), with Aveling being elected to the first National Administrative Council. They had joined the ILP with the goal of shifting its ideology towards Marxism, but were unsuccessful, as the party remained under the influence of Keir Hardie's Christian socialism. By 1897, Marx and Aveling left the ILP to rejoin the Social Democratic Federation, while Donald retired from political activity entirely.
