= Isabella Ford =

English social reformer (1855–1924)

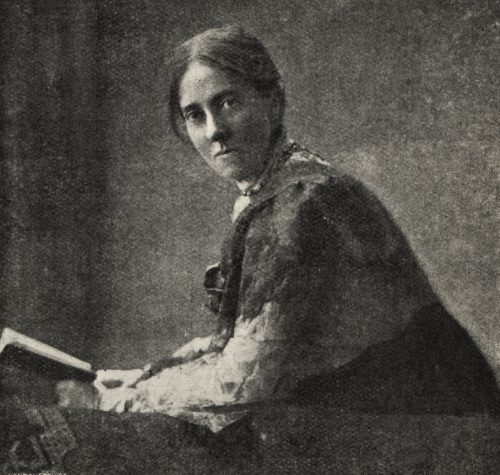
- Born: Isabella Ormston Ford; 23 May 1855; Headingley, England
- Died: 14 July 1924 (aged 69); Leeds, England
- Occupation: Activist

Isabella Ormston Ford (23 May 1855 – 14 July 1924) was an English social reformer, suffragist and writer. She became a public speaker and wrote pamphlets on issues related to socialism, feminism and workers' rights. After becoming concerned with the rights of female mill workers at an early age, Ford became involved with trade union organisation in the 1880s. A member of the National Administrative Council of the Independent Labour Party, she was the first woman recorded as speaking at a Labour Representation Committee (which became the British Labour Party) conference.

== Early life ==
Isabella Ford was on born 23 May 1855 in Headingley, in the Municipal Borough of Leeds, in the north of England. She was the youngest of eight children of Quakers Robert Lawson Ford and Hannah (née Pease). Her mother was a second cousin of abolitionist Elizabeth Pease Nichol and her father was a solicitor and landowner. Ford and her sisters were taught by governesses at home, learning a wide variety of subjects and becoming fluent in French and German. Her parents financed a night school for mill girls in the East End of Leeds, where she began working when she was 16. Contact with these girls gave Ford and her sisters an insight into class differences and an interest in working conditions. At only 12 years old, she made an oath to a friend that she would "improve the state of the world".

== Activism ==
Following the example of her radical parents, Isabella campaigned for several causes during her life.

=== Trade unions ===
In the 1880s, Ford became involved with trade unions. She worked with tailoresses who were campaigning for better working conditions; she helped them to form a trade union and was involved when they went on strike in 1889. In 1890–91, she marched with workers from Manningham Mills in Bradford. As a result of her involvement, she was elected a life member of the Leeds Trades and Labour Council.

=== Independent Labour Party ===
Ford helped found the Leeds Independent Labour Party (ILP) and was president of the Leeds Tailoresses' Union. Her concerns were trade union organisation, socialism and female suffrage. She overcame a natural shyness to become an experienced public speaker, speaking at many meetings related to socialism, workers' rights and women's emancipation. She wrote many pamphlets, as well as a column in the Leeds Forward. In 1895 she was elected parish councillor for Adel cum Eccup in Leeds.

In the 1900s, Ford increased her focus on her work for the ILP, and was elected to the National Administrative Council for four years. She became more involved in the national women's suffrage movement, but felt that feminism and the labour movement were equally important. In 1903 she spoke at the annual conference of the Labour Representation Committee (later the British Labour Party), and was the first woman to do so. Ford's language skills enabled her to act as an interpreter at International Labour gatherings. She was also asked to stand for Parliament and was suggested as a candidate for Lady Lord Mayor of Leeds, but she refused to do so.

=== Animal rights ===
Ford supported animal rights and was a vegetarian. She was an anti-vivisectionist and was Chair of Leeds RSPCA. In 1896, Ford signed the Humanitarian League's petition against vivisection.

=== Women's suffrage ===
Following a 1904 debate with future politician Margaret Bondfield, Sylvia Pankhurst described Ford as "a plain, middle-aged woman, with red face and turban hat crushed down upon her straight hair, whose nature yet seemed to me ... kindlier and more profound than that of her younger antagonist".

=== Pacifism ===
The outbreak of the First World War saw Ford refocus her energies on campaigning for peace. She helped to organise the women’s peace rally on 4 August 1914 (the day of Britain's entry into the war) at Kingsway Hall, and in Leeds she set up a branch of the Women's International League and of the Women’s Peace Crusade.

== Personal life ==
Ford formed friendships with Labour politician Philip Snowden, writer Ethel Snowden, Leeds educationalist Frances Lupton, socialist writer Edward Carpenter, poet Walt Whitman, Josephine Butler, Millicent Fawcett and Olive Schreiner. She was one of three women on the first committee of Leeds Arts Club.

Isabella was concerned with animal welfare and was a vegetarian. She was also an accomplished pianist and helped her sister Bessie to run free concerts of classical music for working class people in Leeds.

She lived most of her adult life with her sisters Bessie and Emily in Adel Grange, the Leeds home that the family moved to when she was 10. Isabella and Bessie also had a flat in London where they would stay when they were in the city. Bessie Ford died in 1919 and her sisters moved to a smaller property called Adel Willows in 1922. Isabella Ford died 14 July 1924 following an illness of several months and was buried at the Quaker burial ground near her house in Adel.

== Posthumous recognition ==
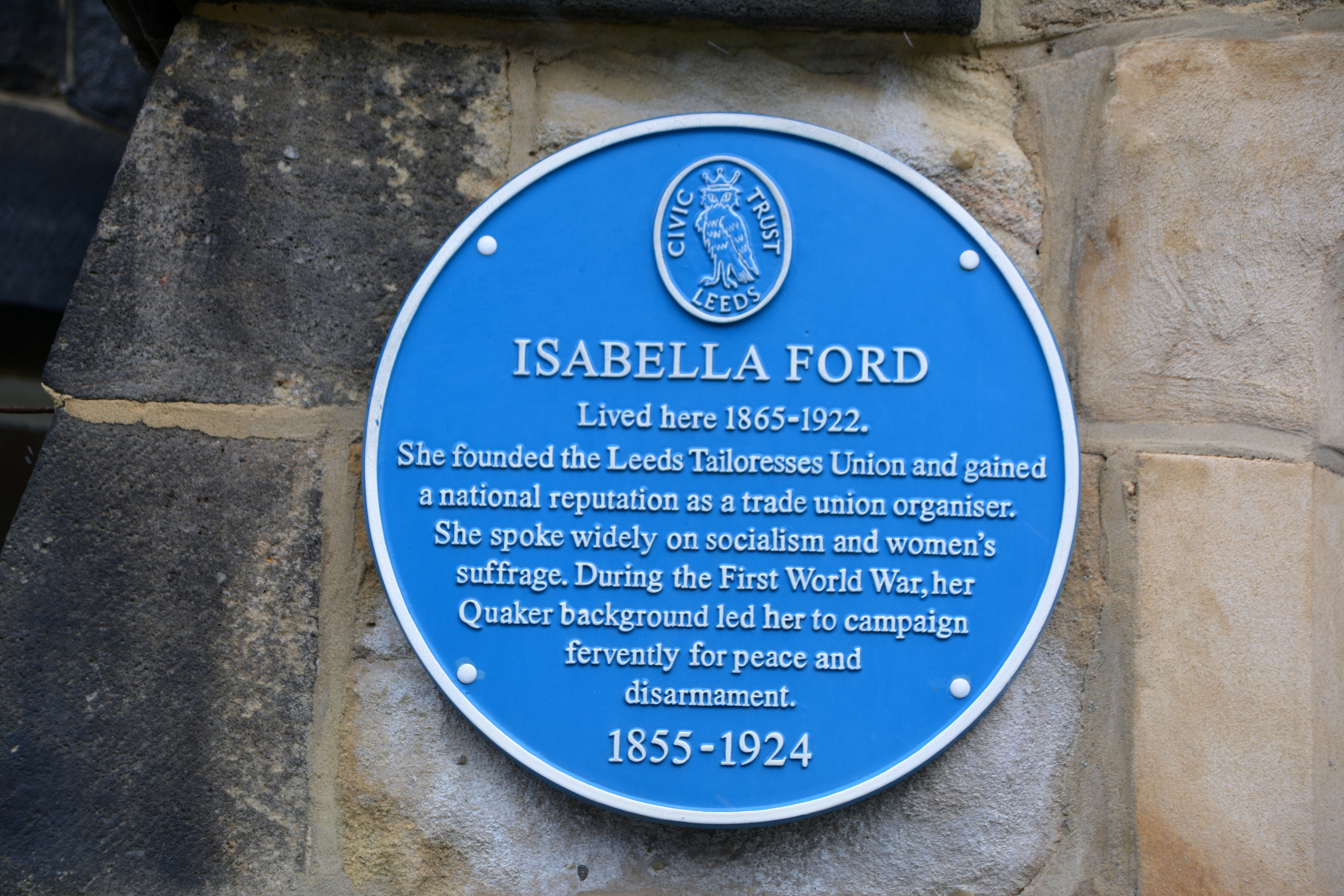
Blue plaque at Adel Grange – Home of Isabella Ford

Ford's name and image, and those of 58 other women's suffrage supporters, are etched on the plinth of the statue of Millicent Fawcett in Parliament Square, London that was unveiled in 2018.

Ford's name is one of those featured on the sculpture Ribbons, unveiled in 2024.

== Selected publications ==
- Miss Blake of Monkshalton (1890)
- Women's Wages and the Conditions Under Which They Are Earned. London: Humanitarian League. 1893.
- On the Threshold (1895)
- Mr Elliott (1901)
