= The Marriage of George, Duke of York, with Princess Mary of Teck =

Painting by Laurits Tuxen

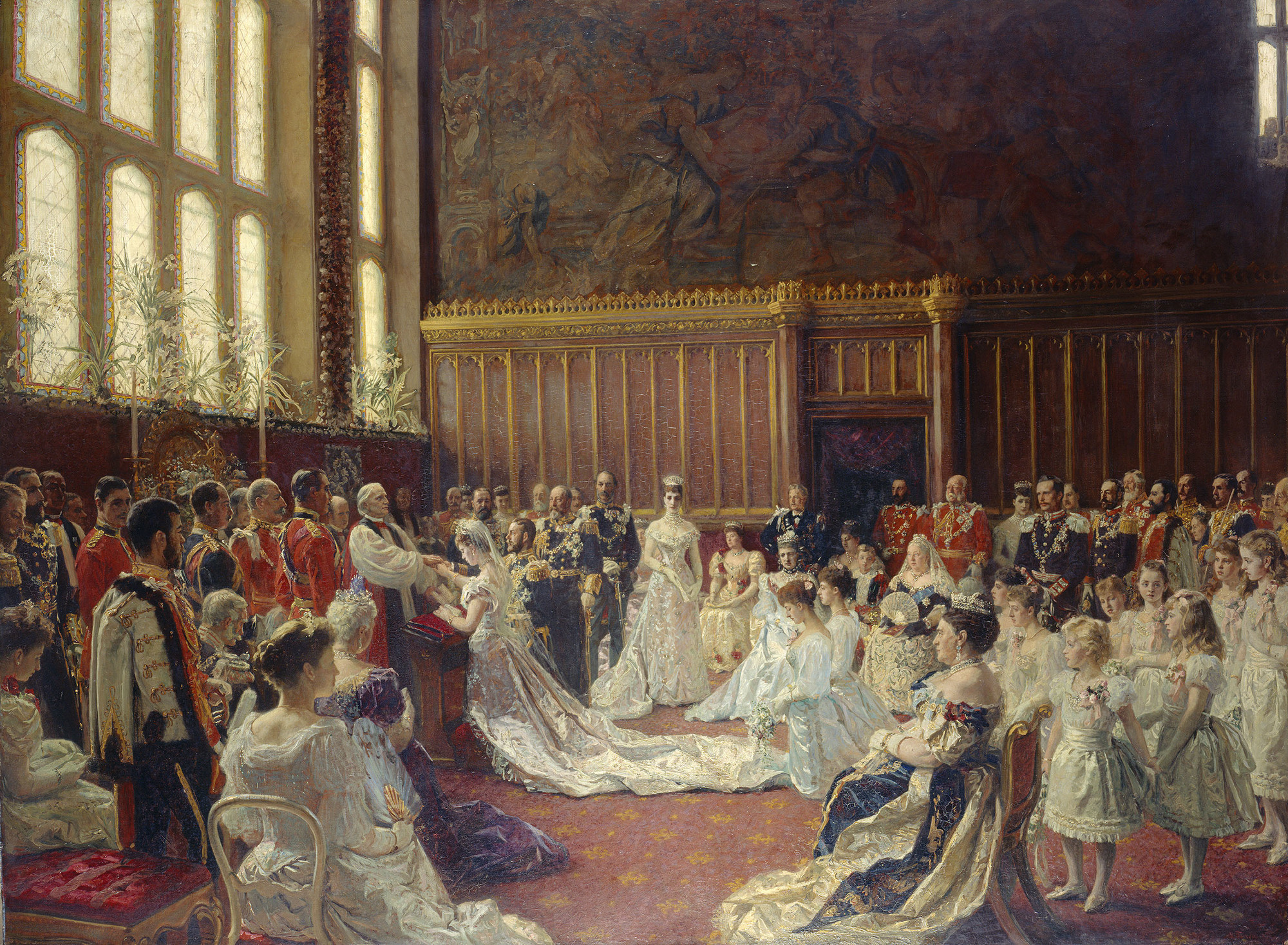
- Artist: Laurits Tuxen
- Year: 1894
- Type: Oil on canvas, historical painting
- Dimensions: 169.5 cm × 229.9 cm (66.7 in × 90.5 in)
- Location: Royal Collection

The Marriage of George, Duke of York, with Princess Mary of Teck is an oil on canvas history painting by the Danish artist Laurits Tuxen, from 1894.

== History and description ==
It depicts the wedding of Prince George, Duke of York (later King George V) and Princess Victoria Mary of Teck (later Queen Mary) at the Chapel Royal in St James's Palace on 6 July 1893.

George was the second son of Albert Edward, Prince of Wales (later King Edward VII) and Alexandra, Princess of Wales (later Queen Alexandra) and a grandson of the then-reigning monarch, Queen Victoria. Victoria Mary was the only daughter of Francis, Duke of Teck and Princess Mary Adelaide of Cambridge. Victoria Mary's engagement to Prince Albert Victor, Duke of Clarence and Avondale, the eldest son of the Prince of Wales, had ended with the duke's death on 14 January 1892. In 1892 a tentative proposal of marriage from George was put forward to his first cousin Princess Marie of Edinburgh's parents, but as she was influenced by her Anglophobe mother and governess, Marie rejected him. In May 1893, George and Mary became engaged.

The portrait of their wedding was commissioned by Queen Victoria. It shows the couple kneeling at the altar and surrounded by their family. The open space in the centre adds depth to the painting and allows the observer's focus to shift between the characters depicted. The bride's mother, Princess Mary Adelaide, liked the painting and believed she was "quite recognisable, although not flattered". Tuxen would later go on to paint the wedding portrait for George's younger sister, Princess Maud of Wales.

== Sources ==
- Hichens, Mark (2006). Wives of the Kings of England, From Hanover to Windsor. London: Peter Owen Publishers. ISBN 0-7206-1271-3.
- Pope-Hennessy, James (1959). Queen Mary, 1867-1953. London: George Allen and Unwin Unlimited.
