= John Lincoln Mahon =

British trade unionist and political activist

John Lincoln Mahon (8 June 1865 – 19 November 1933) was a Scottish trade unionist and politician, best known as a prominent socialist activist.

Mahon was born in Edinburgh, to Irish parents, with the surname "McMahon". He followed in his father's trade by becoming an engine fitter.

Mahon was an early member of the Social Democratic Federation (SDF), in June 1884 launching "The Social Reform Publishing Company", a venture that did not last more than a few months, but also leading socialist propaganda in Edinburgh. However, instead of forming an Edinburgh branch of the SDF, they formed the Scottish Land and Labour League which affiliated to the SDF. Mahon sided with William Morris when he seceded with a majority of the SDF executive to form the Socialist League.

In 1884, Mahon moved to London, where he served as the first secretary of the Socialist League. However, he stood down in 1885, and in 1887 and early 1888 he travelled the north of England. He authored "A Labour Programme" in 1888, with an introduction by Robert Cunninghame-Graham of the Scottish Labour Party, later said to be a blueprint for the formation of the Independent Labour Party (ILP) five years later. With Henry Alfred Barker, he founded the Labour Union, which adopted the programme as its platform, and he served as joint chair of the party until August 1889.

Mahon moved to Leeds in 1890, but found himself blacklisted from most jobs due to his political activism. After an abortive attempt to become an independent 'labour' candidate in the 1892 Leeds South by-election, he was a candidate for the ILP in Aberdeen North in the 1895 General election coming second winning 608 votes (12.8%).

In 1900, Mahon relocated to Dublin, working as a commercial salesman, strangely becoming involved in the Dublin Liberal Unionist Association. His son, John, was born in 1901, like his father was politically active and became a Communist, standing for election unsuccessfully in the 1949 St Pancras North by-election.

Mahon returned to London in 1904, remaining there for the remainder of his life, although he stood for the Liberal Unionists in the 1906 General Election in the Dublin Harbour constituency taking 872 votes (19.33%) and losing to the Nationalist candidate. He supported World War I, and near the end of the war joined the social democratic National Socialist Party .

He was married to Swiss born Marie in the 1901 census he stated No Religion, while his wife was documented as a Calvinist.

Party political offices
Preceded by New position	Secretary of the Socialist League; 1885	Succeeded by Henry Halliday Sparling
