= Tom Maguire (socialist) =

British socialist, trade union organiser and poet

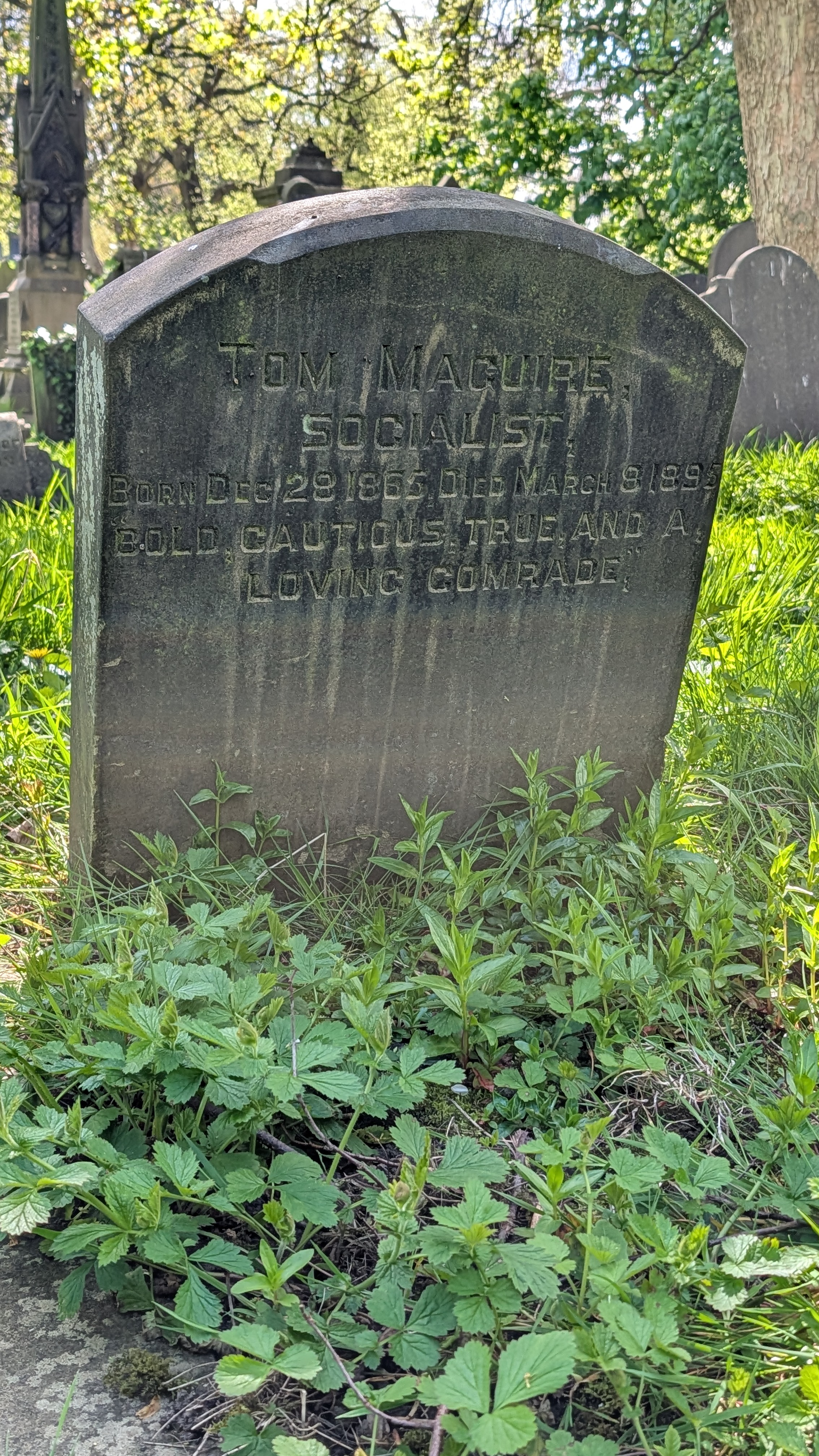
- Born: December 29, 1865
- Died: March 8, 1895 (aged 29)
- Occupations: Socialist, trade unionist, poet

Tom Maguire (29 December 1865 – 8 March 1895) was a British socialist, trade union organiser and poet from Leeds.

== Early life ==
Maguire was born to an Irish immigrant family in the poverty-stricken Bank area of Leeds. As a young boy he sang in the choir at St Anne's Church where he was noted for his 'musical voice and poetic tongue'. He received part of his education at Sunday school. Growing up he showed appreciation of his Irish heritage and immersed himself in the music and literature. He was drawn to Romantic poets, such as Shelley and Keats, and began writing his own poetry around this time.

After leaving school, he took a job as a photographer's assistant.

== Introduction to socialism ==
In 1883 Maguire came across a copy of The Christian Socialist in the local secular hall and was converted, helping to establish a branch of the Social Democratic Federation in September 1884.

In 1885, the Leeds branch of the Social Democratic Federation dissolved and declared themselves as members of the breakaway Socialist League headed by William Morris. Maguire's name appears under the Socialist League's manifesto published February 1885. It was here he met other leading Socialist figures in the area, including Isabella Ford, Edward Carpenter, Ben Turner and Alf Mattison.

== Activism ==
The League organised open-air meetings at Vicar's Croft which Maguire and others spoke at, and it was from these that they made contact with building workers whom Maguire helped organise a successful strike in 1889 for a wage increase. This was the backdrop to the Leeds Gasworkers strike in June–July 1890 where Maguire helped organise the workers and other trade unionists to try to stop scabs (strikebreakers) entering the gasworks, which ultimately led to the strike's victory. After the Socialist League split, Maguire joined the Independent Labour Party and attended its founding conference at Bradford in 1893.

== Poetry ==
Maguire had poetry published in numerous journals including The Commonweal (1887), To Day (1887), Labour Leader, Yorkshire Factory Times, The Leeds Labour Chronicle (1893) and Labour Champion (1893), the last of which he also edited. His poems published under the pseudonym Bardolph were primarily humorous commentaries on current events, which are discussed by Elizabeth Carolyn Miller alongside Maguire's poems highlighting the plight of the working classes and his popular socialist songs that were included by Edward Carpenter in his collection Chants of Labour (1888). Many of Maguire's poems from the Labour Leader about the lives of working-class women were gathered together for the collection Machine-Room Chants, which was published posthumously in 1895 and included a foreword written by Keir Hardie.

== Death ==
Maguire died on 8 March 1895 after collapsing of pneumonia earlier in the month. A week later, more than 1000 people turned out for his funeral. He is buried at Beckett Street Cemetery with the epitaph: 'socialist, bold, cautious, true and a loving comrade'.

His obituary in the Leeds Mercury read:

"He had long given thought to matters affecting capital and labour, and as a public speaker was logical and lucid, holding his own debate... His name as a Labour leader was known all over the North of England, and by his death the Labour movement has lost a keen sympathiser and an earnest champion."

He is commemorated by a red plaque in Leeds bus station, a site very close to his principal areas of activity, and in the Tom Maguire Memorial Lecture, a series to be given annually or bi-annually, organised by Richard Burgon, MP for East Leeds, and inaugurated in 2019.
