= The International Anarchist Movement in Late Victorian London =

1983 book by Hermia Oliver

- Author: Hermia Oliver
- Subject: Anarchism in the United Kingdom
- Publisher: Croom Helm
- Publication date: 1983
- Pages: 176
- ISBN: 9780312419585

The International Anarchist Movement in Late Victorian London is a 1983 history book by Hermia Oliver.

== Bibliography ==
- Levy, Carl (1984). "Review of The International Anarchist Movement in Late Victorian London". History Workshop (18): 186–192. ISSN 0309-2984. JSTOR 4288599.
- Porter, Bernard (1984). "Review of The International Anarchist Movement in Late Victorian London". History. 69 (226): 342. ISSN 0018-2648. JSTOR 24419499.
- Reichert, William O. (1984). "Review of The International Anarchist Movement in Late Victorian England". Albion: A Quarterly Journal Concerned with British Studies. 16 (3): 338–339. doi:10.2307/4048792. ISSN 0095-1390. JSTOR 4048792.
- Shpayer-Makov, Hala (1985). "Review of The International Anarchist Movement in Late Victorian London". The International History Review. 7 (3): 478–480. ISSN 0707-5332. JSTOR 40105514.
- Sinai, Joshua (2016). "Review of The International Anarchist Movement in Late Victorian London [Routledge Library Editions: Terrorism and Insurgency, Volume 7]". Perspectives on Terrorism. 10 (5): 167. ISSN 2334-3745. JSTOR 26297687.
- Woodcock, George (1985). "Review of The International Anarchist Movement in Late Victorian England". Victorian Studies. 28 (2): 346–347. ISSN 0042-5222. JSTOR 3827189.
- https://books.google.com/books?id=PHRvEAAAQBAJ&pg=PA4
