= Hoxton (UK Parliament constituency) =

Parliamentary constituency in the United Kingdom, 1885–1918

- Former borough constituency for the House of Commons

1885–1918
- Seats: one
- Created from: Hackney
- Replaced by: Shoreditch

Hoxton was a borough constituency centred on the Hoxton district of London. It returned one Member of Parliament (MP) to the House of Commons of the Parliament of the United Kingdom, elected by the first past the post system.

== History ==
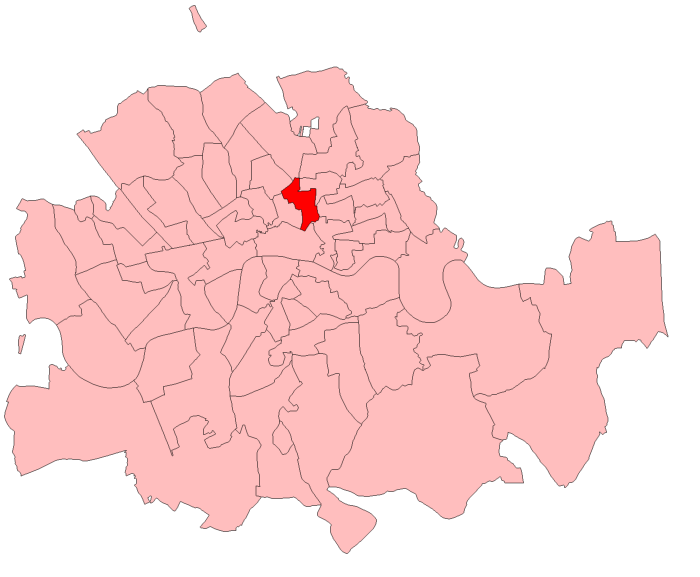
Hoxton in the Metropolitan area, boundaries 1885-1918

The constituency was created by the Redistribution of Seats Act 1885 for the 1885 general election, and abolished for the 1918 general election.

== Boundaries ==
A map showing the wards of Shoreditch Metropolitan Borough as they appeared in 1916

The constituency was created in 1885, as a division of the parliamentary borough of Shoreditch in the East End of London. The area was administered as part of the Tower division of the county of Middlesex.

The division consisted of the Church, Hoxton, Moorfields and Wenlock wards.

In 1889 there were administrative changes. The territory of the constituency was severed from Middlesex and included in the new County of London. The lower tier of local government in the area continued to be administered by parish vestries and local boards of works.

In 1900 local government in London was rationalised. The civil parish of St. Leonard, Shoreditch became part of a larger Metropolitan Borough of Shoreditch.

In the redistribution of parliamentary seats in 1918, the Metropolitan Borough of Shoreditch constituted a single parliamentary division of Shoreditch. The Hoxton division was abolished.

== Members of Parliament ==
Election	Member	Party
1885	James Stuart	Liberal
1900	Claude Hay	Conservative
1910	Christopher Addison	Liberal
1916	Christopher Addison	Coalition Liberal
1918	constituency abolished	

== Election results ==
=== Elections in the 1880s ===
General election 1885: Hoxton
Party	Candidate	Votes	%
Liberal	James Stuart	3,084	60.1
Conservative	Robert Arthur Germaine	2,047	39.9
Majority		1,037	20.2
Turnout		5,131	60.6
Registered electors		8,469	
Liberal win (new seat)			

General election 1886: Hoxton
Party	Candidate	Votes	%	±%
Liberal	James Stuart	2,324	52.8	−7.3
Conservative	Robert Arthur Germaine	2,079	47.2	+7.3
Majority		245	5.6	−14.6
Turnout		4,403	52.0	−8.6
Registered electors		8,469		
Liberal hold		Swing	-7.3	

=== Elections in the 1890s ===
General election 1892: Hoxton
Party	Candidate	Votes	%	±%
Liberal	James Stuart	3,410	61.6	+8.8
Conservative	Claude Hay	2,114	38.1	−9.1
Labour Union	Alexander Karley Donald	19	0.3	New
Majority		1,296	23.5	+17.9
Turnout		5,543	69.2	+17.2
Registered electors		8,011		
Liberal hold		Swing	+9.0	

James Stuart

General election 1895: Hoxton
Party	Candidate	Votes	%	±%
Liberal	James Stuart	2,990	51.1	−10.5
Conservative	Claude Hay	2,862	48.9	+10.8
Majority		128	2.2	−21.3
Turnout		5,852	66.6	−2.6
Registered electors		8,789		
Liberal hold		Swing	−10.7	

=== Elections in the 1900s ===
General election 1900: Hoxton
Party	Candidate	Votes	%	±%
Conservative	Claude Hay	2,866	52.5	+3.6
Liberal	James Stuart	2,595	47.5	−3.6
Majority		271	5.0	N/A
Turnout		5,461	70.1	+3.5
Registered electors		7,789		
Conservative gain from Liberal		Swing	+3.6	

Henry Ward

General election 1906: Hoxton
Party	Candidate	Votes	%	±%
Conservative	Claude Hay	3,489	55.9	+3.4
Liberal	Henry Ward	2,753	44.1	−3.4
Majority		736	11.8	+6.8
Turnout		6,242	80.5	+10.4
Registered electors		7,754		
Conservative hold		Swing	+3.4	

=== Elections in the 1910s ===
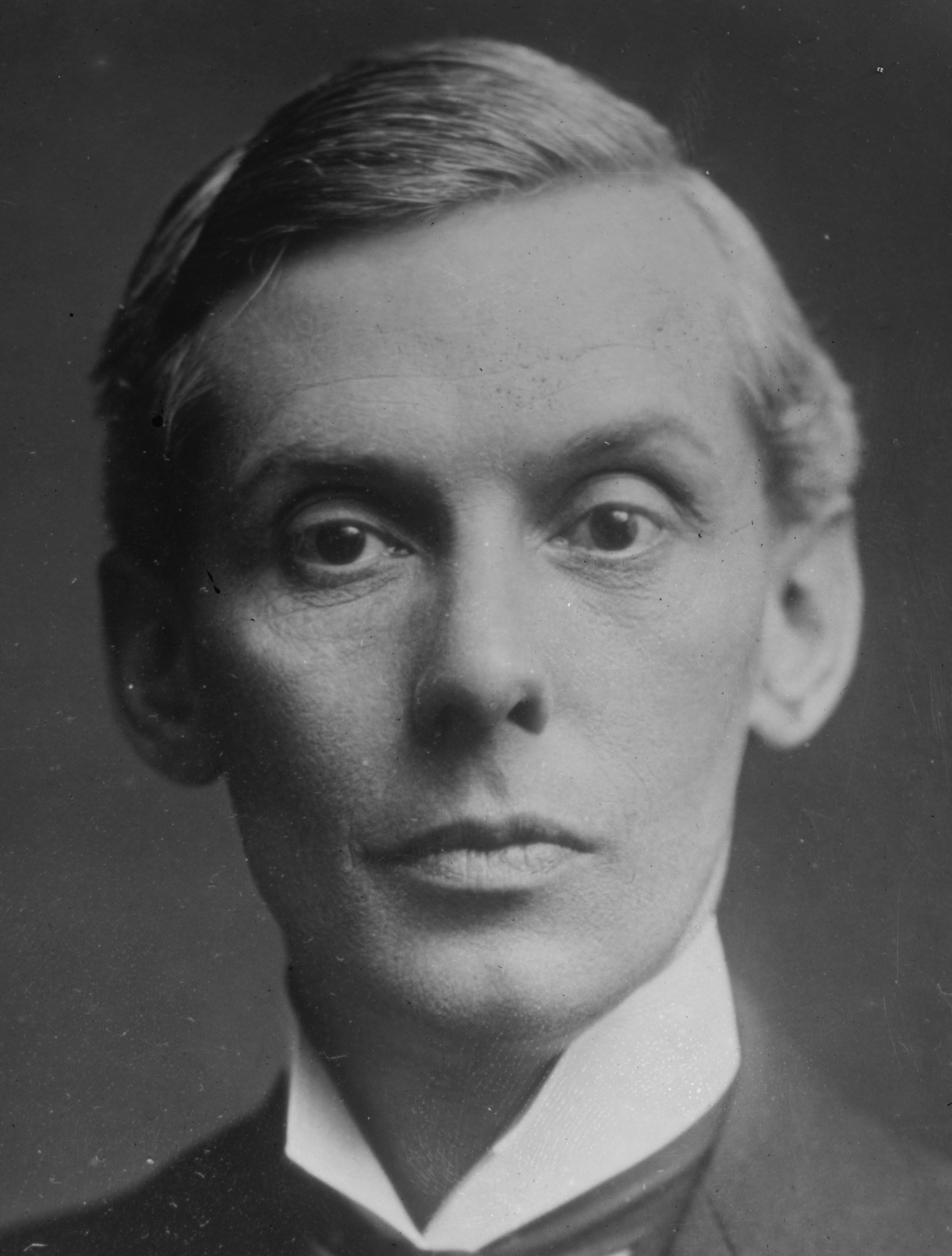
C. Addison

General election January 1910: Hoxton
Party	Candidate	Votes	%	±%
Liberal	Christopher Addison	3,736	52.4	+8.3
Conservative	Claude Hay	3,398	47.6	−8.3
Majority		338	4.8	N/A
Turnout		7,134	83.6	+3.1
Registered electors		8,530		
Liberal gain from Conservative		Swing	+8.3	

General election December 1910: Hoxton
Party	Candidate	Votes	%	±%
Liberal	Christopher Addison	3,489	55.5	+3.1
Conservative	Francis Francis	2,795	44.5	−3.1
Majority		694	11.0	+6.2
Turnout		6,284	73.7	−9.9
Registered electors		8,530		
Liberal hold		Swing	+3.1	
