= Commonweal (newspaper) =

The Commonweal
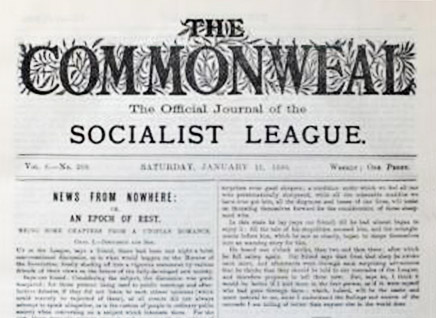
- Cover of The Commonweal, January 1886
- Founded: 1885
- Ceased publication: 1894
- Political alignment: Socialism

The Commonweal was a British socialist newspaper founded in 1885 by the newborn Socialist League. Its aims were to spread socialist views and to win over new recruits.

William Morris, founder of the League, was its chief writer, money finder and "responsible head". Edward Aveling was the sub-editor. Before the last meeting of the Social Democratic Federation, Morris and Aveling visited Frederick Engels to discuss their proposed paper. The first number appeared at the beginning of February 1885. John Turner, Ernest Belfort Bax and Eleanor Marx also regularly contributed articles. Its publishing office was at Great Queen Street, London. At first it appeared as a monthly (with supplements) from February, 1885 to May 1, 1886. It then commenced as a weekly.

E. P. Thompson has written: "The second number, in March, must surely have been one of the most remarkable issues of any British Socialist periodical. An Editorial by Morris, articles by Bax, Stepniak, George Bernard Shaw, Paul Lafargue, Frank Kitz and Aveling were capped by three outstanding items: Eleanor Marx-Aveling’s “record” included messages greeting the formation of the League from Bebel, Liebknecht, Vaillant, Lafargue, Leo Frankel, Kautsky, Pierre Lavroff, Stepniak and Domela Nieuwenhuis: Morris contributed his “Message of the March Wind”, which was to serve as the prelude to The Pilgrims of Hope: and Engels contributed his remarkable article, “England in 1845 and in 1885”, which was later included in his Preface to the English edition of The Condition of the Working Class in England in 1844."

Aveling was unable to devote the necessary time on a weekly basis and Bax replaced him as sub-editor. As E. P. Thompson writes: "Almost every issue included at least one major contribution from Morris. During 1885 "The Pilgrims of Hope" appeared in monthly instalments: during 1886 and 1887 his series of articles with Bax, "Socialism from the Root Up", appeared side by side with "A Dream of John Ball"." Aveling's "Lessons in Socialism", a series of lessons on Marx's "Das Kapital", that had not yet appeared in English translation, were published in nine instalments from April 1885 until March 1886.

In 1890, Morris resigned as editor and was replaced by the anarchist David Nicoll (Morris went on to publish the Hammersmith Socialist Record, the paper of the Hammersmith Socialist Society). With the dissolution of the Socialist League, the paper continued as the independent publication of the Commonweal Group. Nicoll published an article on the Walsall Anarchists, for which he was sentenced to eighteen months' hard labour in May 1892; H. B. Samuels then became acting editor.

Soon after Nicoll's release, the paper was closed and replaced by his own periodical The Anarchist. Nicoll later resurrected the name The Commonweal for this publication, under which name it continued sporadically from 1898 to 1907.

== Editors ==
1885: William Morris and Edward Aveling
1890: Frank Kitz and David Nicoll
1891: David Nicoll
1892: Thomas Cantwell
1893: H. B. Samuels

== See also ==
- Justice (newspaper)
