= Socialist League (UK, 1885) =

Late 19th-century revolutionary socialist group in the United Kingdom

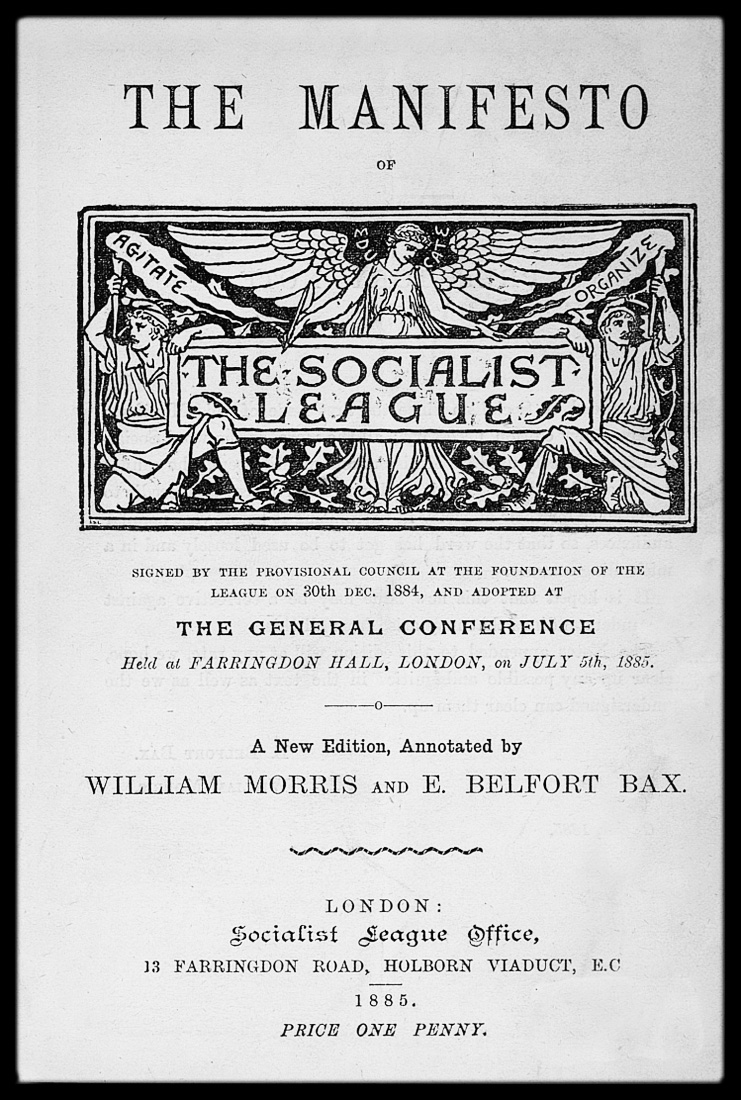
- The cover of the Socialist League's manifesto of 1885 featured art by Walter Crane, a member of the group.
- Abbreviation: SL
- Leader: William Morris
- Secretary: John Lincoln Mahon (1884–1885); Henry Halliday Sparling (1885–1886); Henry Alfred Barker (1886–1888); Fred Charles (1888); Frank Kitz (1888–1890)
- Founders: William Morris; Eleanor Marx; Ernest Belfort Bax; Edward Aveling
- Founded: 27 December 1884
- Dissolved: 1901
- Split from: Social Democratic Federation
- Succeeded by: Bloomsbury Socialist Society
- Headquarters: 24 Great Queen Street, London
- Newspaper: Commonweal
- Membership (1887): 550
- Ideology: Revolutionary Socialism; Anarchism (From 1890s)
- Political position: Far-left
- International affiliation: Second International

The Socialist League was an early revolutionary socialist organisation in the United Kingdom. The organisation began as a dissident offshoot of the Social Democratic Federation of Henry Hyndman at the end of 1884. Never an ideologically harmonious group, by the 1890s the group had turned from socialism to anarchism, and disbanded in 1901.

== Organizational history ==
The Founders of the Socialist League
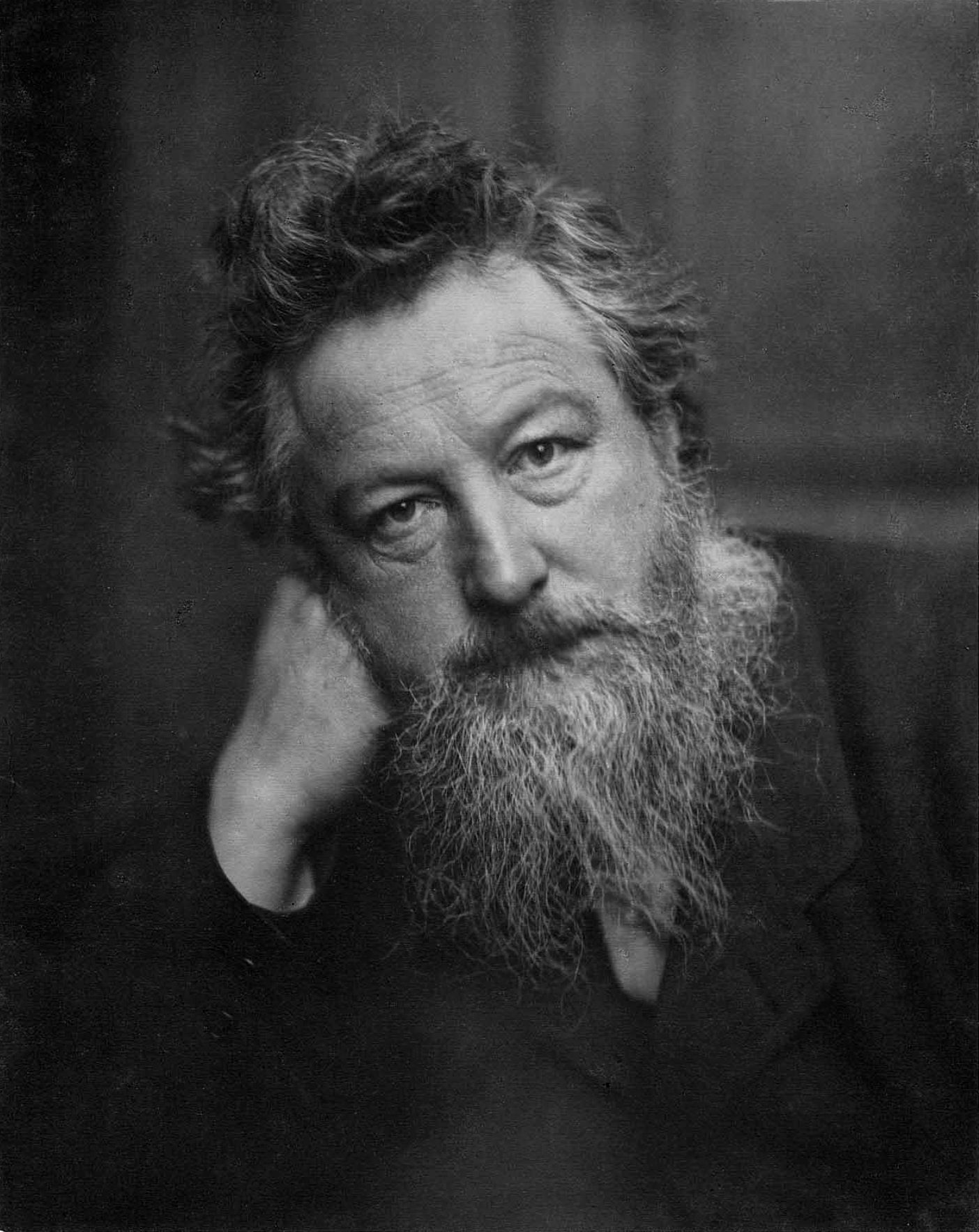
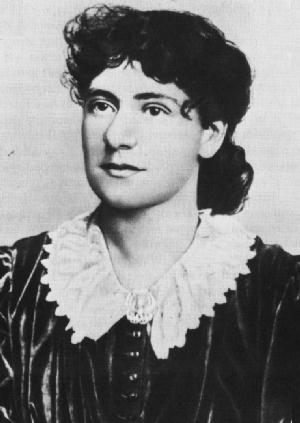
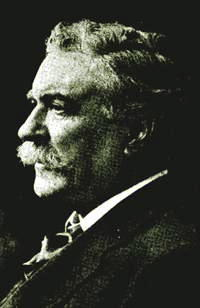
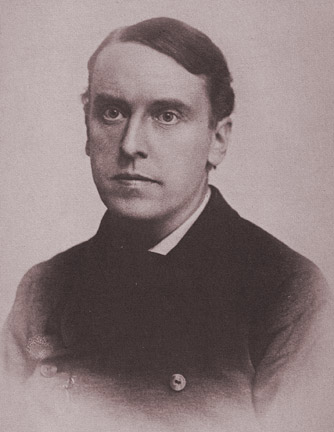
Clockwise from top-left: William Morris, Eleanor Marx, Edward Aveling, Ernest Belfort Bax

=== Origins ===
Until March 1884, the members of the Democratic Federation, forerunner of the Social Democratic Federation (SDF), worked together in harmony. The new organisation had expected to make rapid headway with existing radical workingmen's organisations but few chose to join the SDF. Early enthusiasm gave way to disappointment and introspection. Personal relationships began to loom large among the small group's leading members. The personal vanity and domineering attitude of the organisation's founder, Henry Hyndman, along with his nationalism and fixation on parliamentary politics, were the leading causes of the internal acrimony.

By the end of 1884, a group of SDF members sought to remove Hyndman from his position as party leader in December Executive Council meetings. A resolution to censure Hyndman passed by a vote of 10 to 8. The anti-Hyndman dissidents handed in their prepared letter of resignation, believing the federation's lack of fraternal cooperation to be irreconcilable. The 10 seceding members of the old SDF Executive Council issued a statement To Socialists in January 1885 explaining their perspective.

Early in 1885, the secessionists established themselves in a new organisation called the Socialist League. Several SDF branches, such as those in East London, Hammersmith, and Leeds, joined the new group. In Scotland the Scottish Land and Labour League severed its connection with the SDF to join the new organisation. Several important individuals in the movement such as author Edward Carpenter and artist Walter Crane also chose to cast their lot with the fledgling Socialist League.

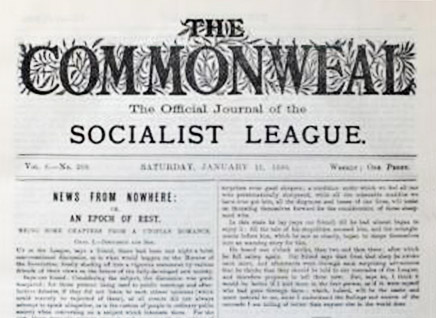
The Commonweal was the official organ of the Socialist League.

In February 1885 the new party established its official journal, a newspaper called Commonweal. This publication was initially published monthly but was soon converted into a weekly. Editor of the publication was William Morris, who paid the paper's operating deficit out of pocket.

=== Development ===
The Socialist League was a heterogeneous organisation, including Fabians, Christian Socialists, anarchists, and Marxist revolutionary socialists. While the Marxists tolerated the earnest ethical socialists, the anarchists concerned them, with memories of the role of the anarchist schism in the First International still fresh in their memory. Eleanor Marx was one of the Socialist League leaders who was particularly concerned about the place of the largely non-English anarchists in the new party.

The Socialist League was involved in the fight for the right of free speech in London during 1885 and 1886. Whereas religious organisations such as the Salvation Army were allowed to preach in the streets, the London Metropolitan Police banned the Socialists from similar activities. Members of the Socialist League and their rivals the SDF simply continued to speak and to incur fines, attracting public attention, until the authorities made the decision that their prosecution was counterproductive and stopped their interference. Thereafter, public interest in the street meetings rapidly evaporated.

While the political contributions of the tiny Socialist League were not measurable, it did have a lasting literary impact. The newspaper of the Socialist League, The Commonweal, provided the venue for first publication of a number of original writings, including the serialized novels of William Morris, Dream of John Ball and News from Nowhere.

In 1887, the League's membership split ideologically into three factions: anarchists, parliamentary-oriented socialists, and anti-parliamentary socialists.

=== Anarchist control ===
Around the middle of this same year, 1887, anarchists began to outnumber socialists in the Socialist League. The 3rd Annual Conference, held in London on 29 May 1887 marked the change, with a majority of the 24 delegates voting in favor of an anarchist-sponsored resolution declaring that "This conference endorses the policy of abstention from parliamentary action, hitherto pursued by the League, and sees no sufficient reason for altering it." Frederick Engels, living in London and a very interested observer in the League's affairs, saw William Morris' role as decisive. Morris, a benefactor of the Commonweal, declared on principle that he would quit if the League took any parliamentary action.

Many of the group's international socialists began to leave. In August 1888, the London branch of the Socialist League, which included Eleanor Marx and Edward Aveling, seceded in favor of establishing itself as an independent organization, the Bloomsbury Socialist Society. By the end of 1888 many other parliamentary-oriented individuals had exited the Socialist League to return to the SDF, with others who remained hostile to the SDF's parliamentary emphasis choosing to involve themselves in the burgeoning movement for so-called "New Unionism." As the socialist factions left, the anarchist faction solidified its hold on the organisation.

By 1889, the anarchist wing had completely captured the organisation. William Morris was stripped of the editorship of Commonweal in favor of Frank Kitz, an anarchist workman. Morris was left to foot the ongoing operating deficit of the publication, some £4 per week — this at a time when £150 per year was the average annual family income in the kingdom. By the autumn of 1890, Morris had had enough and he, too, withdrew from the Socialist League.

=== Disestablishment ===
The anarchist movement had newspapers of its own, including the journals Liberty and Freedom.

The William Morris Society "reformed" the Hammersmith branch for one day on the TUC March for the Alternative on 26 March 2011. The banner was paraded again on 20 October 2012.

== Notable members ==
=== Secretaries ===
1885: John Lincoln Mahon
1885: Henry Halliday Sparling
1886: Henry Alfred Barker
1888: Fred Charles
1888: Frank Kitz
1890: Woolf Wess

=== Other members ===
- Edward Aveling
- Eleanor Marx Aveling
- Ernest Belfort Bax
- Edward Carpenter
- Walter Crane
- Bruce Glasier
- Bill Holmes
- Tom Maguire
- Sam Mainwaring
- William Morris
- Andreas Scheu
- Raymond Unwin

== Conferences of the Socialist League ==
Year	Name	Location	Dates	Delegates
1885	1st Annual Conference	Farringdon Hall, London	5 July	
1886	Semi-Annual Conference		25 January	
1886	2nd Annual Conference		13 June	
1887	3rd Annual Conference	13 Faringdon Road, London	29 May	24
1888	4th Annual Conference	13 Faringdon Road, London	20 May	
1889	5th Annual Conference		June	
1890	6th Annual Conference	Communist Club, Tottenham Court Road, London	25 May	14

Data from International Institute of Social History, "Finding Aid for the Socialist League Archive," supplemented by Kapp, Eleanor Marx: Volume 2, passim and Marx-Engels Collected Works, Volume 48, passim.

== Bibliography ==
- Beer, Max (1929). A History of British Socialism. Vol. 2. London: George Bell & Sons. pp. 253–258. OCLC 491581602.
- Clayton, Joseph (1926). The Rise and Decline of Socialism in Great Britain, 1884–1924. London: Faber and Faber. pp. 9–53. OCLC 252439938.
- Kapp, Yvonne (1976). Eleanor Marx. Vol. 2. London: Lawrence & Wishart. ISBN 0853153701. OCLC 658156891.
