= Balthasar Grün =

- Born: c. 1861; Kirchhain, Hesse, Germany
- Died: 12 September 1882 (aged 21–22); Hanau, Hesse, Germany
- Cause of death: Suicide
- Citizenship: German
- Occupation: Woodcarver
- Organization: Black International
- Movement: Anarchism

Balthasar Grün (c. 1861 – died by suicide in prison, 1882) was a German woodcarver and anarchist. Relatively young during his involvement in the anarchist movement, he moved within early 1880s circles, engaged in illegalist activities, and was arrested in Germany in possession of formulas for making explosives. After presumably providing information about his friend, Otto Rinke, he chose to commit suicide by hanging.

Born in Kirchhain around 1861, he traveled during his youth and joined German anarchist circles in Paris. Arrested alongside Malatesta and other anarchists after a turbulent demonstration honoring the Communards, he was deported with him to Belgium before discreetly returning to France. The following year, he supported sending a delegate to the London Congress. Then, in 1882, Grün was implicated in the murder of a wealthy woman, whose money he sought to seize to fund the anarchist cause. He was sheltered for a time by Jean Grave before leaving for Germany with Rinke, carrying formulas for manufacturing explosives sewn into his clothes.

Arrested a few months later with Rinke, he presumably gave information about him, perhaps to avoid being extradited to France, where he was wanted for the murder. This strategy did not seem to work, and Grün chose to commit suicide in September 1882.

Following his death, his memory was both embraced by German anarchists, who elevated him to a martyr, and used by conflicting factions in the Bruderkrieg to accuse Rinke of causing the suicide and of having himself passed on information regarding Grün, assessments that have been criticized by more recent historians.

== Biography ==
=== Birth and first years ===
Balthasar Grün was born around 1861 in Kirchhain, Hesse (Germany). He was described as having red hair. Around 1877, according to his own testimony, he moved to Paris. Grün worked there as a woodcarver. This may have been where he met his compatriot Otto Rinke, although the date of such a meeting is not clear. It is also possible that he met him in Germany or Switzerland.

=== Anarchist agitation in Paris and illegalist activities (1880-1882) ===
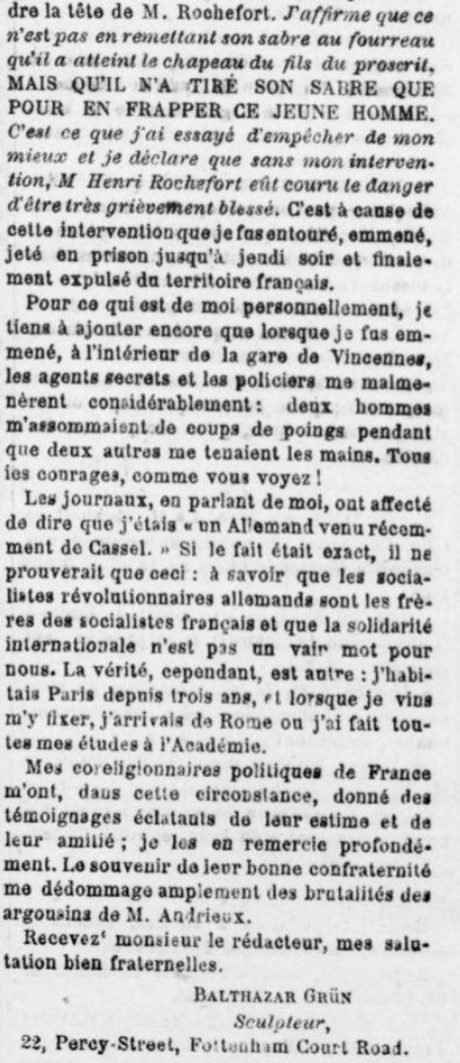
Parts of the letter by Balthasar Grün to Le Mot d'Ordre (5 June 1880)

On 23 May 1880, Grün participated in the demonstration held in Paris to honor the dead of the Commune. During this demonstration, following the confiscation of a bouquet of immortelle flowers by plainclothes police officers, he was struck in the face and retaliated by hitting the officers back, attempting to disarm one of them who was charging him and Henri Rochefort with a saber. Arrested, he was severely beaten at the police station, according to his own testimony. Arrested alongside him were François Jeallot, Eugène-Joseph Fournière, Antoine Étienne, Charles Fiaroni, Errico Malatesta, Apostolos Paolides, Gustave Bazin, Gabriel Deville, Alexandre Hérault, Léonard Dupaix, Henri Finance, Félix Dujardin, Léon-Hubert Bastide, Alexandre Colliot, and Jules-Auguste Ardouin. He claimed to have been born in Kassel (Hesse) following his arrest.

Grün received an expulsion order in the days that followed and was transported in a prison wagon to the Belgian border alongside Paolides and Malatesta. He traveled to London, from where he wrote a letter in early June to Le Mot d'Ordre, criticizing the authorities' version of events and highlighting police maneuvers during the demonstration. In this correspondence, he stated that he had come to Paris in 1877 from Rome, where he claimed to have studied at the Academy.

He returned to France and resettled in Paris under a pseudonym between 1880 and 1881. Grün frequented the social studies circle of Levallois-Perret and possibly the international club of Paris. Alongside Rinke and J.A. Goosens, he signed the mandate authorizing Jean Miller to represent both groups at the London Congress (1881). During this period, despite his young age, he was a prominent figure within the German movement.

After hearing a woman 'of ill repute', according to the press, named Céline Renoux, boasting about her money from the open window of his home in Les Halles, he decided to kill and rob her. According to a faction of German anarchists (especially those opposed to Rinke's faction during the Bruderkrieg), Rinke had planned the murder, whereas according to Jean Grave, the plot had been devised by a French anarchist later suspected of being a police informant. Grave only provided the letter P. and mentioned that this individual had been a member of the social studies circle of Levallois-Perret, but in 1930, he admitted to Nettlau that it was a certain Pigeon or Pichon.

In any case, on 28 February 1882, Grün went to her home under the pretext of a meeting with this 'courtesan', then murdered her by slitting her throat with a broken champagne bottle, before stealing whatever money he could find (between 1,000 and 3,000 francs) and fleeing. Despite the stolen cash, she had deposited most of her funds into the bank a few days earlier, and he only managed to retrieve this fraction of a fortune estimated by the press to be around 100,000 francs. The proceeds of this robbery were intended to fund propaganda efforts.

During his time on the run, he was sheltered for a few days by Grave, to whom he had been recommended by Jeallot without Grave being informed of the crime. Once his host realized his involvement in the affair, Grün was gently nudged out by Grave, who came to inquire about the date he wished to leave Paris. Shortly thereafter, Grün headed back to Germany, where he reunited with Rinke. He carried away with him from Paris a series of formulas sewn into his clothing, including sketches for manufacturing dynamite bombs, formulas for making hydrocyanic acid, and instructions on how to poison bullets and buckshot using hydrocyanic acid.

=== Arrest in Germany and suicide (1882) ===
Grün was arrested a few months later, in early July 1882, in Kassel, while Rinke was captured in Darmstadt. The formulas in his clothing, which were the same clothes he had worn during the murder of Renoux, were found by the German police. He was also in possession of numerous coded messages. Both were incarcerated in Hanau, in the city's courthouse prison (Fronhof, since destroyed). They occupied adjacent cells. For a time, he worked stripping tobacco leaves inside the prison.

Over the next two months, Grün provided a series of details to the German police during interrogations, likely attempting to negotiate a reduced sentence and/or avoid extradition to France, where his involvement in the Renoux murder was becoming increasingly apparent to authorities. He thus revealed Rinke's identity and provided other details regarding their establishment in Germany and the setting up of groups.

Unfortunately for him, this strategy did not seem to work. In early September 1882, he learned that France was demanding his extradition and began to be questioned by the German police regarding the Renoux murder. This also followed the taking of his photograph, which was sent to France. The French police presented his photograph mixed with others of uninvolved individuals, and witnesses confirmed the identification. Realizing his betrayal had no effect on his case, he chose to commit suicide. On the evening of 12 September 1882, he shouted 'Farewell' to Rinke, but the latter thought it was merely a casual greeting and paid little attention. During the night, Grün used pieces of string he had gathered from the tobacco bundles to fashion a rope and hanged himself. He was 21 or 22 years old at the time of his death.

== Legacy ==
His death had several immediate consequences. First, it was used during the Bruderkrieg by the faction of Johann Most and Victor Dave to implicate Rinke. In their accusations, which John Neve shared to some extent, Rinke was claimed not only to be behind the Céline Renoux affair but also to have driven Grün to suicide, possibly after providing information to German authorities to frame him in his stead. This view is criticized by historian Andrew Carlson, who notes that, on the contrary, German police files indicate the opposite: that Grün had betrayed Rinke.

Furthermore, he was also adopted as an iconic martyr for the socialist and anarchist cause. For instance, the third section of the Kommunistischer-Arbeiterbildungsverein, composed mostly of anarchists who met at the Morgenröthe Club (23 Gable Street), displayed an inscription in gold letters on its wall reading: 'Workers, remember your martyrs!' ("Arbeiter gedenkt eurer Martyrer"), below which were written the names of several anarchists who fell victim to repression, including Grün, as well as Reinsdorf, Holzhauer, Küchler, Lieske, Stellmacher, and Kammerer.

== Works ==
- Letter of Grün to Le Mot d'Ordre of 5 June 1880.

== Bibliography ==
- Carlson, Andrew (1972), Anarchism in Germany (PDF), vol. 1, Metuchen, N. J.: The Scarecrow Press, Inc., ISBN 0-8 108-0484-0
- CEP (2026), "Grün, Balthasar [ou Balthazar]", Dictionnaire international des militants anarchistes, Paris
- Grave, Jean (1973), Quarante ans de propagande anarchiste, Paris: Flammarion

As of this edit, this article uses content from "GRÜN, Balthasar", authored by CEP, which is licensed in a way that permits reuse under the Creative Commons Attribution-ShareAlike 3.0 Unported License, but not under the GFDL. All relevant terms must be followed.
