= Autonomie Club =

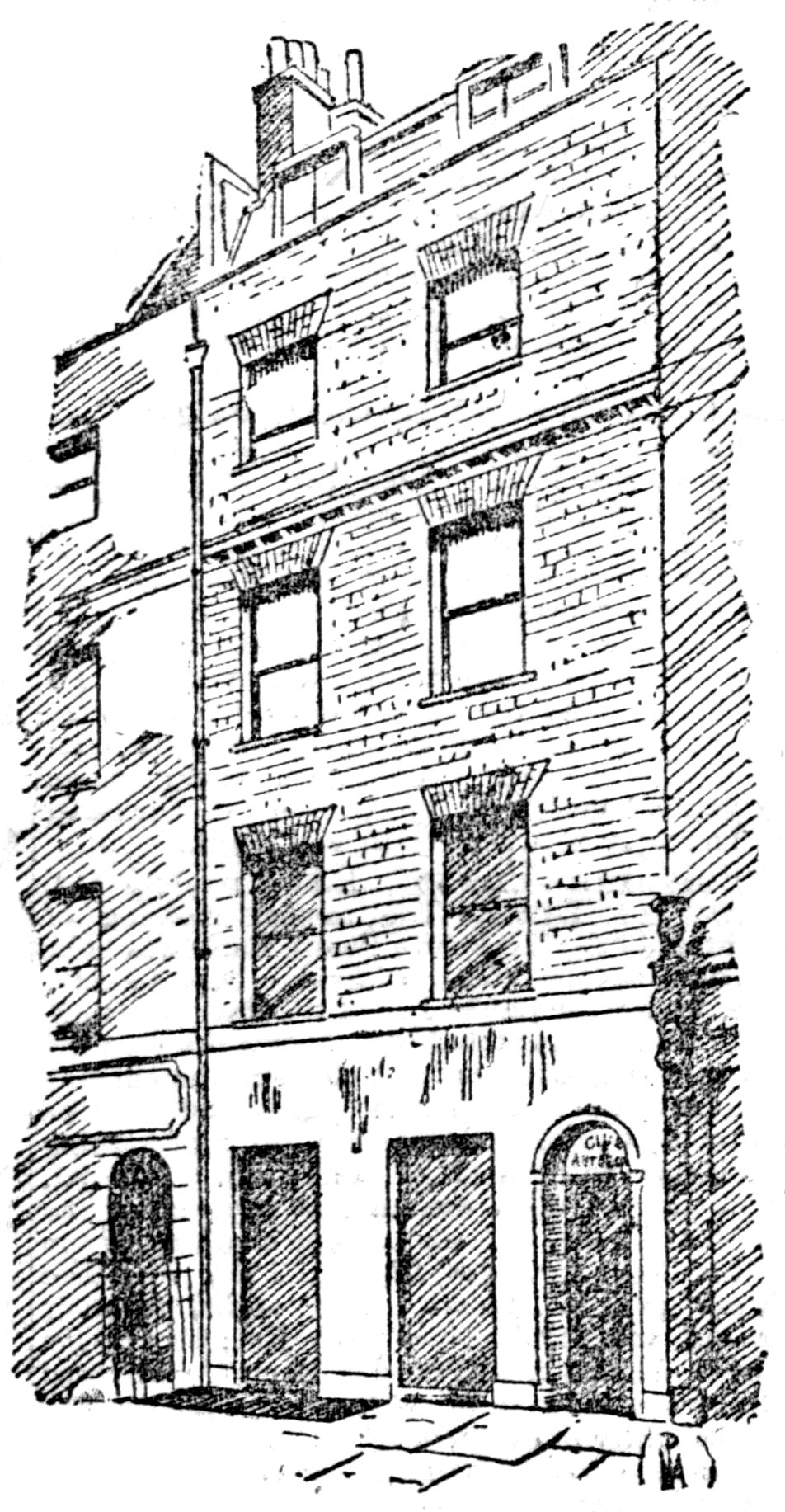
- The Autonomie Club in 1894
- Interactive map of Autonomie Club

Restaurant information
- Established: 1886
- Closed: 1894
- Location: 32 Charlotte Street West then 6 Windmill Street, London, UK

The Autonomie Club, founded in 1886 and dissolved in 1894, was the primary German anarchist club in London during its period of activity. Founded by Josef Peukert, Otto Rinke, and the remainder of their faction expelled by Johann Most's faction during the Bruderkrieg, it progressively grew in importance and served as a gathering place for the anarchist movement in the United Kingdom.

Initially located at 32 Charlotte Street West, it moved to 6 Windmill Street to accommodate its growing number of members and patrons. The club formed a musical group that performed songs there and was noted for the well-ordered nature of the meetings and speeches held on its premises; even though they took place within an anarchist framework, meaning anyone could speak and there was no president or secretary. According to contemporary accounts, women there were noted for dressing in a masculine style and wearing their hair short. Over the course of its history, it established national sections composed of anarchist refugees escaping persecution in other countries. This was the case, among others, for French refugees who flocked to London in large numbers and set up a soup kitchen there to raise funds.

The club, which was visited by several prominent figures of the movement, such as Émile Pouget (then in exile) or Peter Kropotkin, was increasingly perceived as a place where plots against states were being hatched. It was raided and disappeared following the failed attack by Martial Bourdin in February 1894.

Its memory has since been kept alive in art, for instance by William Kentridge, who relocated it to Dakar in one of his works, turning it into a hub for anti-colonial anarchist conspiracy. Generally speaking, it is chiefly remembered in popular culture as being tied to the idea of plots and conspiracies.

== History ==
=== Context : Black International and German clubs in London ===
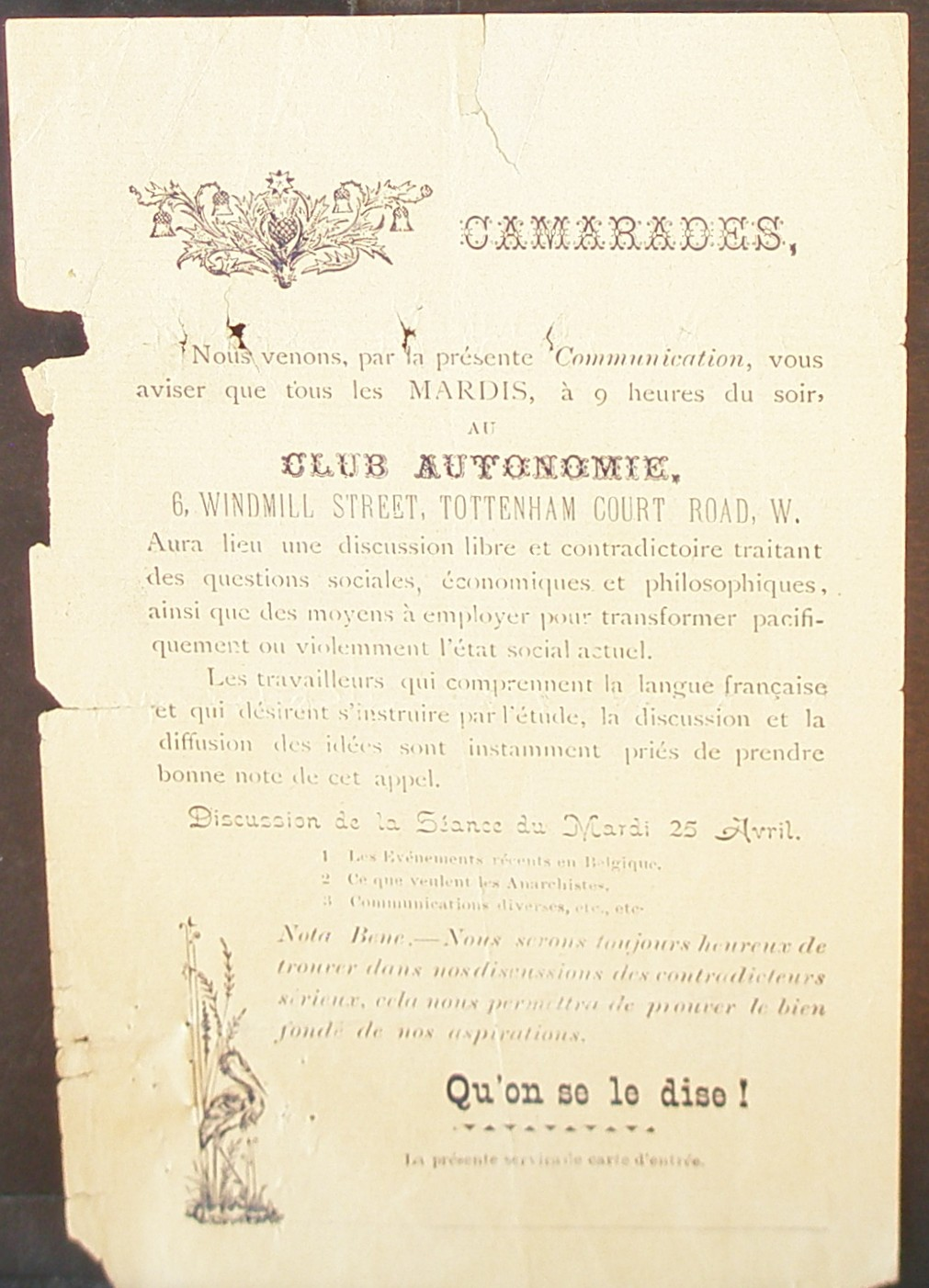
Communication from the French section of the club (1893) (collection of Archives anarchistes)

In 1881, the London Congress, held under the influence of Johann Most and with the participation of Peter Kropotkin, took place in the eponymous city. Organized to refound the anti-authoritarian International on insurrectionary principles and propaganda of the deed, it marked the birth of the Black International.

Within London itself, German anarchists were very numerous, and the German movement lived largely in exile in the United Kingdom and elsewhere. Most of them belonged to the Kommunistischer-Arbeiterbildungsverein, which was subdivided into three subsections: the first and third consisted mainly of anarchists, while the second was primarily of a German social-democratic orientation. Each section established its own club, as the pubs where the revolutionaries used to meet were gradually abandoned due to state surveillance. The first section met at the Whitfield Club at 46 Whitfield Street, the second on Tottenham Street, and the third at the Morgenröthe Club at 23 Gable Street. During this period, these three clubs competed for memberships; they were generally less interested in the quality of their members than in gathering as many as possible, so membership fees were kept very low.

=== Divisions within the German anarchist movement: expulsion of Peukert's faction and start of the Bruderkrieg ===
From the second half of the 1870s, and even more so at the beginning of the 1880s, two factions began to clash within the German anarchist movement. Indeed, one part subscribed to ideas close to those of Bakunin (one of the primary founders of anarchism) or anarcho-collectivism, while another lined up behind those of Kropotkin, a thinker who had joined anarchism during the 1870s and founded anarcho-communism.

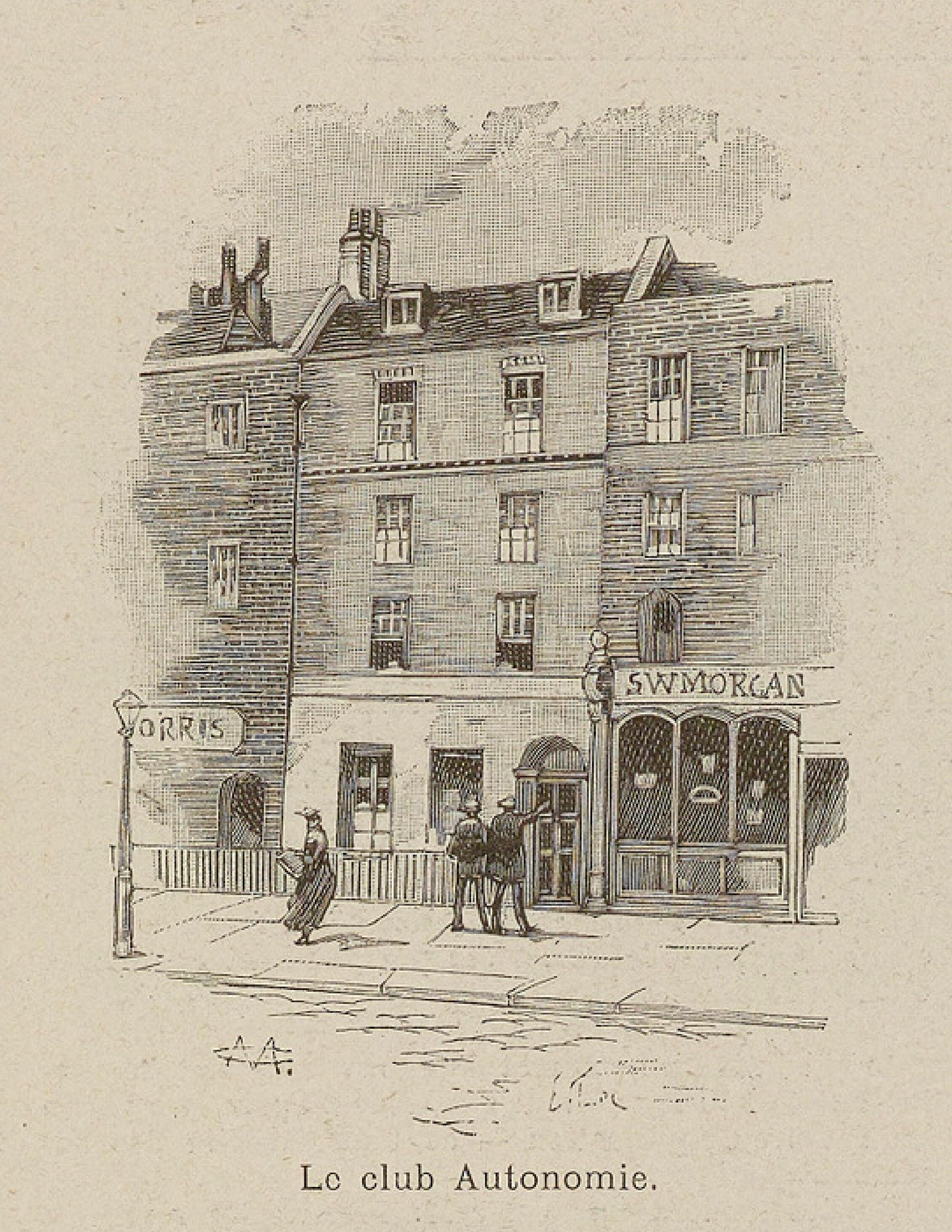
Club facade in L'Illustration of 3 March 1894

Above all, personal and power struggles pitted the two factions against each other. On one side, Johann Most, a relatively prestigious former social-democratic deputy in the Reichstag, a fervent supporter of propaganda of the deed, and the main editor of Freiheit, followed a hybrid ideological line blending Marxism, Blanquism, and anarcho-collectivism, among other influences, and considered himself the nominal 'leader' of the German anarchists. On the other side, Josef Peukert and Otto Rinke, two French-speaking anarchists moving in circles close to Kropotkin, meaning they were in touch with the latest developments in continental anarchist thought, ran the newspaper Der Rebell, which was modeled after Kropotkin's Le Révolté. Although these two groups initially got along, the republication of Peukert and Rinke's newspaper, Der Rebell, triggered an initial conflict with Most's faction, which viewed this revival unfavorably. Between 1883 and 1885, the conflict remained internal to the German anarchist movement, but in 1885, it broke out into the open when Freiheit withdrew its solidarity with Der Rebell. Most notably, this conflict resulted in a schism within the First Section of the Kommunistischer-Arbeiterbildungsverein, which met at the Whitfield Club at 46 Whitfield Street; fifteen anarchists from Peukert's faction were expelled, with the names of eleven of them being:

Peukert, Rinke, Knauerhase, Prinz, Szimmoth, August Reeder, R. Walhausen, Jakob Nowotny, F. Kirchhoff, H. Heinrich, R. Lieske.

=== The Autonomie Club ===
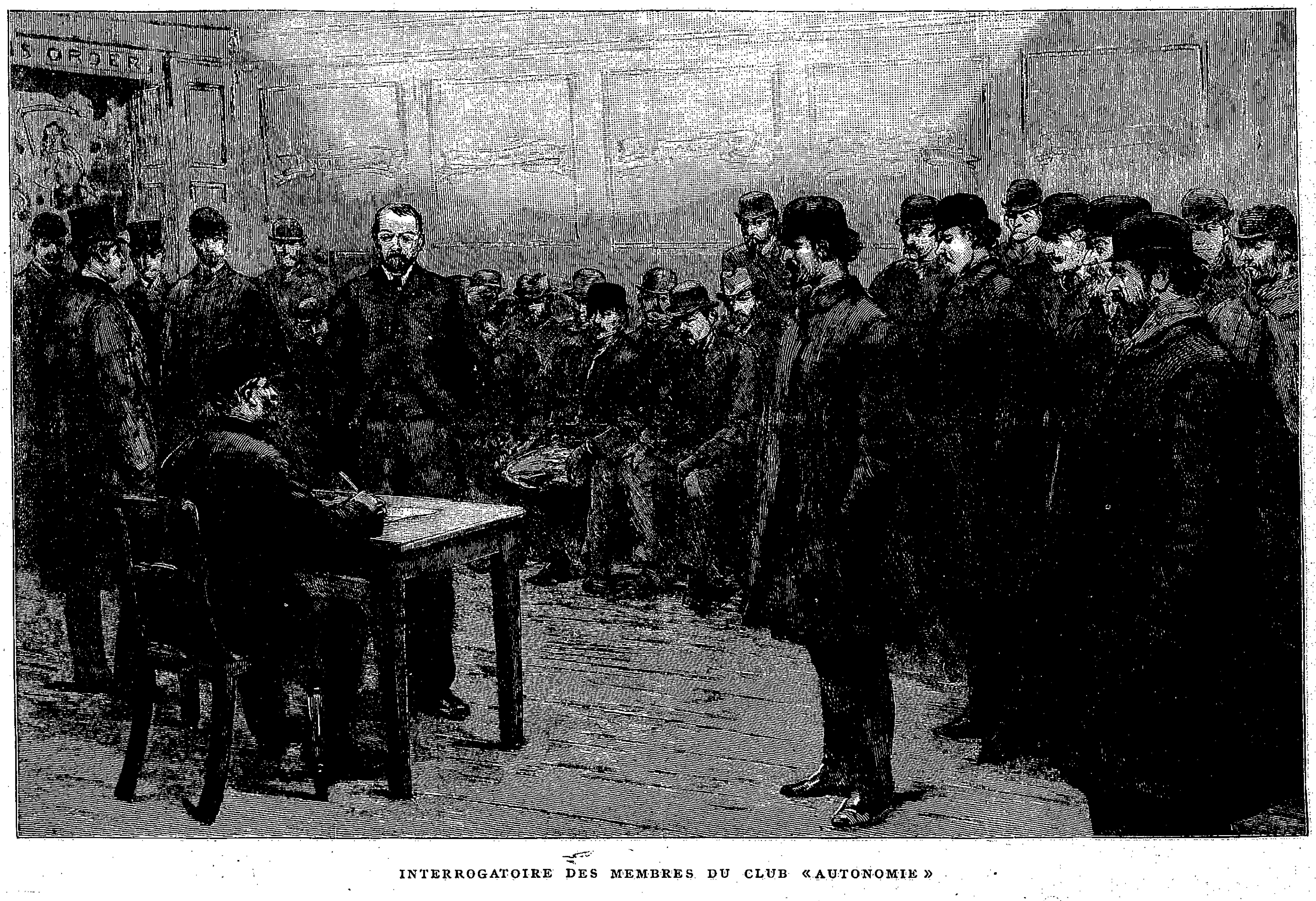
Interrogations of members of the club in L'Univers illustré of 3 March 1894

The expelled group found themselves without premises and decided to found their own rival club, which they named the Autonomie Club. It was located at 32 Charlotte Street West but was quickly overwhelmed by the sheer mass of people going there. To meet the need for new premises, the members of the group, which also took the name Autonomie, sold or pawned some of their valuables, such as rings, watches, or other jewelry. This allowed them to raise the necessary funds (£100) to purchase premises at 6 Windmill Street, which were not only better located but larger.

Unlike other German anarchist clubs of the period, the club featured a stage for singers and, in fact, formed a musical group for this purpose. The venue was noted for being poorly furnished, with chairs, benches, and tables reportedly bought cheaply. Furthermore, the club was open to anyone who wished to join, with no preliminary questioning. Like the other clubs, however, it had neither a president nor a secretary; anyone who wished to speak could do so provided they received general approval. The meetings and speeches were noted for being generally very quiet and well-conducted. The nature of these speeches, however, was radical, anarchists there would frequently threaten the lives of millionaires.

The club's clientele, which was mixed, was noted in some accounts for its distinct clothing styles; the men often wore sombreros and red ties, while the women wore short skirts, masculine attire, and frequently had short hair.

Generally speaking, the club became an international gathering place for the movement, even as it emerged victorious, though heavily weakened by the loss of Rinke and Peukert (who left the movement), from its conflict with Most's faction. The club established national sections that grew over the following years; the French group expanded in response to the repression faced by anarchists in the 1880s and during the Ère des attentats. The French refugees notably ran a soup kitchen there, which helped them raise some funds for solidarity funds, they also launched the newspaper L'International there, a particularly incendiary publication that favored propaganda of the deed.

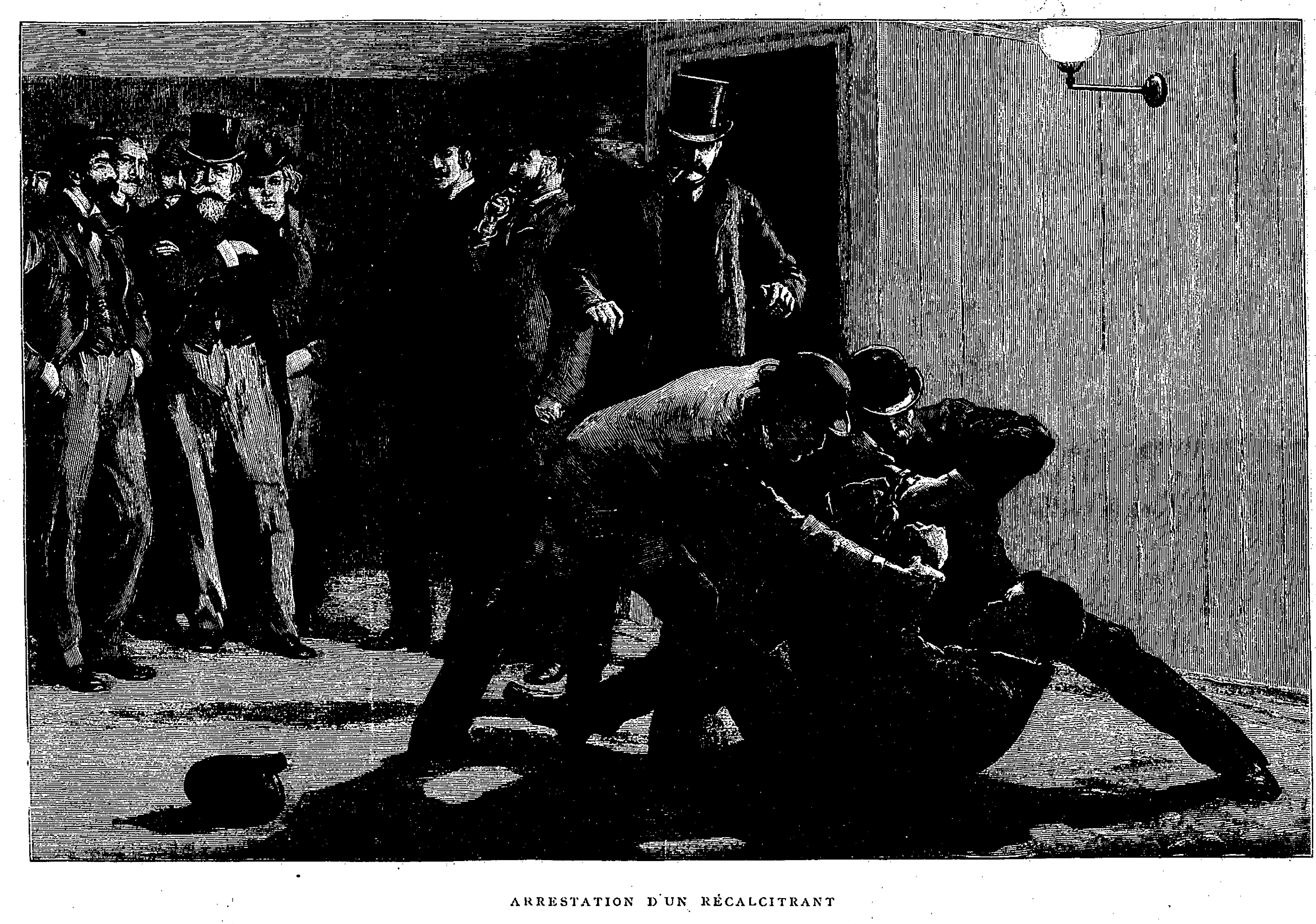
Arrest of members of the club in L'Univers illustré of 3 March 1894

Among those who frequented the club in the 1890s were both Émile Pouget and Peter Kropotkin. The latter gave speeches there in which he defended anarchist participation in trade unions. A British police official ironically noted that during this period, about a third of the club's members would be informants.

In 1894, the club was harshly raided following the attack carried out by Martial Bourdin, who was a member, at the Greenwich Observatory. These raids proved fruitless for the authorities but led to the demise of the club.

== Legacy ==
=== The Autonomie Club as a center of conspiracies in the collective imagination and artistic interpretations ===
In his analysis of the British press illustrations during the 1894 raids, historian Jonathan Moses highlights how the media treated the club, viewing it as a sort of prime hub for secret conspiracies.

This interpretation was taken up by the artist William Kentridge in his work Blowing the Meridian, which was inspired by Bourdin's attack. In this piece, Kentridge recreated the Autonomie Club but relocated it to Dakar, Senegal, turning it into the epicenter of anarchist plots directed against colonial powers.

== Bibliography ==
- Bantman, Constance (2013), The French Anarchists in London (1880-1914) : Exile and Transnationalism in the First Globalisation, Liverpool: Liverpool University Press, ISBN 978-1-84631-880-1
- Carlson, Andrew (1972), Anarchism in Germany, vol. 1, Metuchen, N. J.: The Scarecrow Press, Inc., ISBN 0-8 108-0484-0
- Moses, Jonathan (2016), The Texture of Politics: London's Anarchist Clubs, 1884 – 1914, London: Royal Holloway University
