= Bruderkrieg (anarchism) =

- Date: 1883 – 1888
- Location: London, Germany, Austria, United States of America
- Result: Pyrrhic anarcho-communist victory.: Severe weakening of the German anarchist movement for decades to come.; Die Autonomie supplants Freiheit in Europe.

Parties
Centralist and rather anarcho-collectivist tendency united around Freiheit	Autonomous and rather anarcho-communist tendency united around Die Autonomie

Lead figures
Johann Most; Victor Dave	Josef Peukert; Otto Rinke; Peter Kropotkin

Casualties and losses
Withdrawal of Dave and Most from the movement	Withdrawal of Peukert and Rinke from the movement

The Bruderkrieg (English: Brothers' War) is the name given to a conflict that divided the German anarchist movement between roughly 1883 and 1888. It pitted two factions against each other: a centralizing one, more or less aligned with anarcho-collectivist views, gathered around the newspaper Freiheit and Johann Most; and another, more autonomous faction more or less aligned with anarcho-communist views, gathered around the newspapers Der Rebell and later Die Autonomie, led by Josef Peukert. The conflict led to the demise of the German anarchist movement for decades to come.

Born out of personal, theoretical, and power struggles among various leaders of the 1880s German anarchist movement, the Brothers' War began as a latent conflict between the editorial boards of Freiheit and Der Rebell, with the two groups clashing indirectly between 1883 and 1885. The conflict then erupted into the open, resulting in the expulsion of Peukert's faction from the first section of the Kommunistischer Arbeiterbildungsverein. The expelled group then rallied around the Autonomie group, newspaper, and club, which they founded.

In 1887, the arrest of John Neve, a key figure in the German anarchist movement, marked the end of any attempts at reconciliation, as both factions accused each other of collaborating with the authorities to orchestrate the arrest. Peukert and Otto Rinke, as well as Most's ally Victor Dave, left the movement shortly thereafter. Most, who continued his attacks against Die Autonomie, was also eventually marginalized and discredited within the movement following the intervention of Peter Kropotkin, who sided with Peukert. In Europe, Die Autonomie emerged as the winner of the fight between the two tendencies, although the movement was very weakened by the conflict.

== History ==
=== Context : Black International and German clubs in London ===
In 1881, the London Congress, held under the influence of Johann Most and with the participation of Peter Kropotkin, took place in the eponymous city. Organized to refound the anti-authoritarian International on insurrectionary principles and propaganda of the deed, it marked the birth of the Black International.

Within London itself, German anarchists were very numerous, and the German movement lived largely in exile in the United Kingdom and elsewhere. Most of them belonged to the Kommunistischer-Arbeiterbildungsverein, which was subdivided into three subsections: the first and third consisted mainly of anarchists, while the second was primarily of a German social-democratic orientation. Each section established its own club, as the pubs where the revolutionaries used to meet were gradually abandoned due to state surveillance. The first section met at the Whitfield Club at 46 Whitfield Street, the second on Tottenham Street, and the third at the Morgenröthe Club at 23 Gable Street. During this period, these three clubs competed for memberships; they were generally less interested in the quality of their members than in gathering as many as possible, so membership fees were kept very low.

=== Premises : Ideological dissensions and power struggles ===
Although nearly all the German forces involved agreed on the strategy of the propaganda of the deed, and this was not a point of contention between them, numerous theoretical and organizational issues began to divide the German movement starting in the 1870s. Indeed, one part subscribed to ideas close to those of Bakunin (one of the primary founders of anarchism) or anarcho-collectivism, while another lined up behind those of Kropotkin, a thinker who had joined anarchism during the 1870s and founded anarcho-communism. The two anarchist tendencies or schools of thought clashed on several points, including the question of production and that of a revolutionary vanguard, which was defended by the anarcho-collectivists and criticized by the anarcho-communists. Generally speaking, German social democrats who became anarchists during this period tended to adopt Bakuninist positions, whereas anarcho-communism was growing more rapidly among new 'converts' and was progressively becoming the majority tendency within the movement.

Above all, personal and power struggles pitted the two factions against each other. On one side, Johann Most, a relatively prestigious former social-democratic deputy in the Reichstag, a fervent supporter of propaganda of the deed, and the main editor of Freiheit, followed a hybrid ideological line blending Marxism, Blanquism, and anarcho-collectivism, among other influences, and considered himself the nominal 'leader' of the German anarchists. On the other side, Josef Peukert and Otto Rinke, two French-speaking anarchists moving in circles close to Kropotkin, meaning they were in touch with the latest developments in continental anarchist thought, ran the newspaper Der Rebell, which was modeled after Kropotkin's Le Révolté.

Peukert and Most quickly developed a fierce hatred for one another upon meeting in 1880, a grudge they both took to their graves. According to Max Nettlau and Emma Goldman (who was herself close to Most), Peukert was jealous of Most and wished to take his place. However, more recent historian Andrew Carlson argues that the deep-seated reason for his enmity lay instead in organizational matters; Peukert considered the centralization of the movement to be highly damaging, regardless of whether it was Most or another charismatic figure occupying that role. As early as 1880, he reacted to Freiheit's refusal to publish one of his articles by declaring that a 'newspaper controlled by a single man has no right to call itself social-democratic'.

=== The Bruderkrieg ===
==== The republication of Der Rebell and the internal conflict (October 1883-May 1885) ====
At the end of 1883, Peukert and Rinke relaunched Der Rebell, arguing that Freiheit was becoming too American for European German-speaking audiences and that they needed a dedicated newspaper. While this move prompted an official statement of support from Freiheit, the group surrounding the paper, including Most, Johann Sebastian Trunk, and Victor Dave, viewed this new publication with great skepticism. They feared it would sever their connection with their European readership at a time when Freiheit was facing financial precarity, which a division of funds between two competing papers could worsen.

The animosity between the two groups deepened starting in April 1884, following the publication in Freiheit of a series of articles by Most titled The Free Society: A Treatise on the Principles and Tactics of Communist Anarchists, in which he paradoxically defended positions closer to those of Bakunin and the anarcho-collectivists. Peukert strongly opposed these texts, writing to a fellow anarchist that they were a 'disgrace to the movement'. This letter came to Most's attention, further fueling their conflict. Peukert specifically accused Dave, a close associate of Most, of attempting to centralize the movement.

Following the arrival of John Neve in London after his release from prison, as both camps tried to win him over, Freiheit called a private conference to which most of the key figures were invited. At this conference, Dave and Trunk sought to centralize Freiheit's hold on the movement by finding new methods for distributing and smuggling the newspaper into Germany. Up to that point, the paper had been distributed clandestinely in a more or less haphazard fashion, depending on local contacts and opportunities, sometimes even passing through non-anarchists or people of questionable reliability. Dave therefore proposed that all conference participants, including Peukert and Rinke, hand over the lists of all their contact addresses in Germany and continental Europe to a central committee on which they would serve. Peukert and Rinke fiercely opposed this measure, viewing it not only as an authoritarian maneuver but also as a poor strategy that centralized contacts in London and offered less security against state authorities, such as infiltrators.

Peukert and Dave were also locked in a struggle over which camp John Neve would join. Neve ultimately leaned toward Dave's side, though he maintained ties with both factions, while Peukert managed to secure the support of Gustav Knauerhase. During this period, an article criticizing Peukert and his followers was published in Der Sozialdemokrat. Peukert accused Dave of writing it, and though Dave denied authorship, he stated that he agreed with its contents.

==== Open conflict : The schism of the First Section, expulsion of the dissidents, and the birth of the Autonomie Club (May 1885-February 1887) ====
On 16 May 1885, the conflict, which had until then remained underground, erupted into the open when Freiheit published a document listing 'authorized' addresses to contact in Germany. Furthermore, the publication withdrew the solidarity it had previously extended to Der Rebell.

This article was accompanied by a press campaign from both factions, which clashed through opposing articles criticizing one another. On one side, the first group portrayed Peukert and Rinke as untrustworthy; on the other, the latter portrayed Dave as authoritarian. This conflict resulted in a schism within the First Section, which met at the Whitfield Club at 46 Whitfield Street, and fifteen anarchists from Peukert's faction were expelled. The names of eleven of them were:

Peukert, Rinke, Knauerhase, Prinz, Szimmoth, August Reeder, R. Walhausen, Jakob Nowotny, F. Kirchhoff, H. Heinrich, and R. Lieske.

In response to this expulsion, the members in question reformed as a group, the Autonomie group, and founded a new club: the Autonomie Club. Located at 32 Charlotte Street West, it was quickly overwhelmed by the massive influx of visitors and moved to larger premises at 6 Windmill Street.

In 1886, the group decided to launch a new newspaper, replacing Der Rebell, whose publication had been intermittent up to that point, with Die Autonomie. This newspaper followed a strictly anarcho-communist line and achieved greater success in Germany than Der Rebell. It became the target of accusations from Dave and Most, who attempted to portray it as being funded by the German police. This campaign failed to derail the paper, as it was supported by major figures of anarchism like Kropotkin, and an impartial anarchist jury deemed the accusations completely baseless. Moreover, it was far better managed than their previous title and arrived at a time when Freiheit had been losing momentum and readership since mid-1885. Gradually, Trunk and Neve, who were in Most's camp, began to harbor doubts about his lieutenant, Dave. Trunk hired a private detective agency to spy on Peukert and Rinke to determine the source of their funds; finding no irregularities, he decided to defect to their camp along with a number of his allies.

==== The arrest of Neve and the settling of scores : the splintering of the movement (1887-1888) ====
Shortly thereafter, in February 1887, John Neve, who until then had been one of the primary anarchists managing to evade the German authorities to smuggle all three newspapers into the country, was arrested by the Belgian police and handed over to the German authorities. He was arrested after meeting with a German police informant named Reuss, who was moving in Peukert's circles. Consequently, both factions violently accused each other of being responsible for his arrest. Peukert was directly accused of being a police informant; he defended himself by arguing that Dave's relationship with Trautner, another police informant, was actually responsible for the arrest.

Dave and Peukert clashed over the following years, and both ultimately left their central positions within the movement, as each had been discredited. Peukert was abandoned and had to spend the following decades trying to clear his name of the informant accusations, while Dave had to defend himself against charges of being authoritarian. Rinke and Knauerhase followed the same path, stepping down from their positions within the movement.

Meanwhile, Die Autonomie continued its advance in Germany. Indeed, Freiheit, which was being published in the United States, was becoming increasingly ill-suited for a European and German readership. Most's centralizing, and even authoritarian, ambitions were becoming clearer to anarchists; Neve's arrest cut off his primary route into Germany, and the anarcho-communist theories of Die Autonomie were increasingly viewed as better formulated than the ideology promoted by Most.

Following the departures of Peukert, Dave, and Rinke, Most continued his attacks against Die Autonomie, labeling it a police-funded newspaper to be avoided. An anarchist conference was then convened in London to evaluate the scope of his accusations. Kropotkin, who until then had maintained tacit support for the anti-Most faction, decided to openly intervene and take part in it. The conference cleared the newspaper of all charges against it, marking Most's subsequent marginalization from the German movement.

By the end of the Bruderkrieg, the German anarchist movement was shattered for decades to come. Most of its leading and most active figures withdrew from the movement, and it took a long time to rebuild. Summarizing the outcomes of this conflict, historian Andrew Carlson writes:

Thus the arrest of Neve, resulted in more than the loss of a key man to the movement and the exposure of the smuggling route by which literature and explosives were brought into Germany and distributed there; it brought the Bruderkrieg to a climactic struggle in which the leaders of the movement fell victims to the senseless exchanges of vile allegations. The leaders of the movement were cut off, gone were Neve, Rinke, Peukert, Dave, Most, Trunk, Knauerhase and the countless subalterns who had manned the stations of the smuggling routes into Germany. The German government itself could not have done a more efficient job of destroying the German anarchist movement. The Bruderkrieg accomplished what the Socialist Law, Dynamite Law, the beheading of Hödel, Reinsdorf, Küchler, and Lieske failed to do—it destroyed the movement.

== Bibliography ==
- Carlson, Andrew (1972), Anarchism in Germany, vol. 1, Metuchen, N. J.: The Scarecrow Press, Inc., ISBN 0-8 108-0484-0
- Bantman, Constance (2019). The Foreign Political Press in Nineteenth-Century London : Politics from a Distance. London: Bloomsbury Academic. ISBN 9781350118935.
