= Chicago idea =

Ideology combining anarchism and revolutionary unionism

The Chicago idea is an ideology combining anarchism and revolutionary unionism. It was a precursor to anarcho-syndicalism professed by Chicago anarchists, especially Albert Parsons and August Spies, in the mid-1880s.

== Description and application ==
Associated with Chicago anarchists Albert Parsons and August Spies in the mid-1880s, prior to their executions during the Haymarket affair, proponents of the Chicago idea believed in militant, revolutionary unionism in which the labor union would bring about wholesale social revolution rather than piecemeal reforms, replacing capitalism with a worker-run cooperative commonwealth and economy. Instead of simply a tool for class struggle, the Chicago idea of unions was to prefigure and incubate future society as an autonomous commune, such that the union would prepare the new social order after the fall of capitalism. This ideology put all power in the union members (through direct action) and came with an expectation of distrust towards vainglorious leaders and centralized decision-making.

The Chicago idea featured prominently in the 1883 Pittsburgh Congress of the International Working People's Association, where the role of revolutionary trade unionism was endorsed but not ultimately reflected in its Pittsburgh Manifesto. Parsons and Spies built a large following for the idea between the 1883 congress and 1886 Haymarket affair, though they did concede their absolute condition that the unions would only pursue revolution instead of reform. Offering immediate reforms was far more agreeable for building wide support.

This ideology shared much in common with what would be called anarcho-syndicalism at the turn of the century. Anarcho-syndicalism advocated for the union as the cell for revolutionary agitation, while similarly spurning central authority and political action. The Chicago idea did not address sabotage or the general strike, though historian Paul Avrich notes that these concepts were not developed at the time. While they were related, the rise of anarcho-syndicalism owed more to 1860s/1870s European workers' councils thought and Bakunin's writings on federations of labor unions than to the Chicago idea.

== Bibliography ==
- Avrich, Paul (1984). The Haymarket Tragedy. Princeton University Press. ISBN 978-0-691-04711-9.
- Salerno, Sal (1990). "Anarcho-syndicalism". In Buhle, Mari Jo; Buhle, Paul; Georgakas, Dan (eds.). Encyclopedia of the American Left. Garland Reference Library of Social Science (1st ed.). New York: Garland. pp. 38–40. ISBN 978-0-8240-3713-0. OCLC 20997216.
- Zimmer, Kenyon (2018). "Haymarket and the Rise of Syndicalism". In Levy, Carl; Adams, Matthew S. (eds.). The Palgrave Handbook of Anarchism. Palgrave Macmillan. pp. 353–370. ISBN 978-3-319-75619-6.
