= Black International =

International political party (1881–87)

International Working People's Association
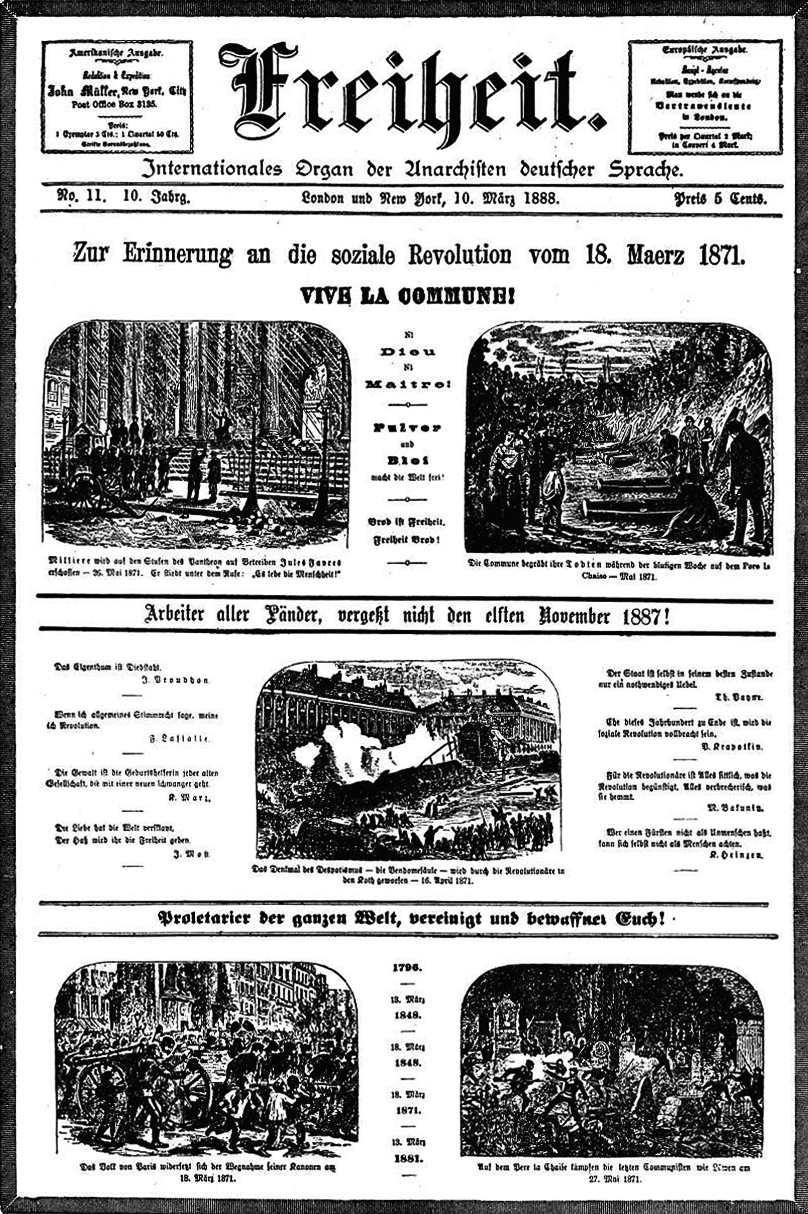
- Cover of Freiheit, weekly newspaper edited by Johann Most
- Abbreviation: IWPA
- Founded: 1881
- Dissolved: Second half of the 1880s
- Preceded by: Anti-authoritarian International
- Succeeded by: Anarchist companionship
- Newspaper: Freiheit; Le Révolté
- Ideology: Insurrectionary anarchism Anarcho-collectivism; Anarcho-communism; Chicago idea
- Political position: Far-left
- International affiliation: At least Europe and the United States, Ottoman Empire and Egypt too

The International Workingmen's Association, historiographically known as the Black International to distinguish it from the preceding First International (1864–1872) and Anti-authoritarian International (1872–1881), was an international anarchist organization founded, or reconstituted, at the London Congress (1881). The organization, which dissolved all visible structures of the Anti-authoritarian International except for a central correspondence bureau held by Errico Malatesta, Johann Sebastian Trunk, and Nikolai Tchaikovsky, and for which the influence of Johann Most was decisive, engaged in a series of insurrectionary and propaganda of the deed activities during the 1880s designed to launch a global revolution. It disappeared in the second half of the 1880s following internal conflicts, heavy state repression, and the use of agents provocateurs, giving rise to anarchist companionship in its place.

Born from the repression of the movement and an alliance between Most's revolutionary socialists and the anarchists of the Anti-authoritarian International, the organization spread across a significant portion of the world. This included the United States, where it was linked to the New York Social Revolutionary Club, the emergence of the Chicago idea and the Haymarket Square massacre, the event that gave birth to May Day, as well as Europe. For instance, in Switzerland, the organization's congresses sought to coordinate insurrectionary actions and propaganda of the deed on a global scale; in France, its influence was felt through the Montceau-les-Mines troubles and the Trial of the 66. It even eventually reached Africa, with Malatesta joining the Anglo-Egyptian War in 1882. In Germany, it was parallel to the Bruderkrieg, a huge rift dividing the 'leaders' of the German movement and increasingly making them ineffective during the 1880s.

The memory of the organization remained significant for anarchists long after its disappearance, with several anarchist organizations claiming its legacy. Other groups, like police forces, were also impacted by it. Thus, during the Ère des attentats (1892–1894), the French police fell into a state of deep paranoia, believing they had rediscovered the Black International behind anarchist attacks. While this interpretation was mistaken, as the organization had disappeared by then, it testified to the enduring power of its legacy, even for the states once impacted by its presence.

== History ==
=== General context and founding at the London Congress (1881) ===
In 1872, the International Workingmen's Association, better known as the First International, split between the anarchists and anti-authoritarians, who formed the majority of the organization, and the Marxists and Blanquists. This division, formalized during the congresses of The Hague and Saint-Imier, led to the formation of two opposing internationals. The anti-authoritarians and anarchists gathered within an organization called historiographically as the Anti-authoritarian International (1872–1880s), while their opponents formed the Marxist International (1872–1876), with both sides claiming to be the First International.

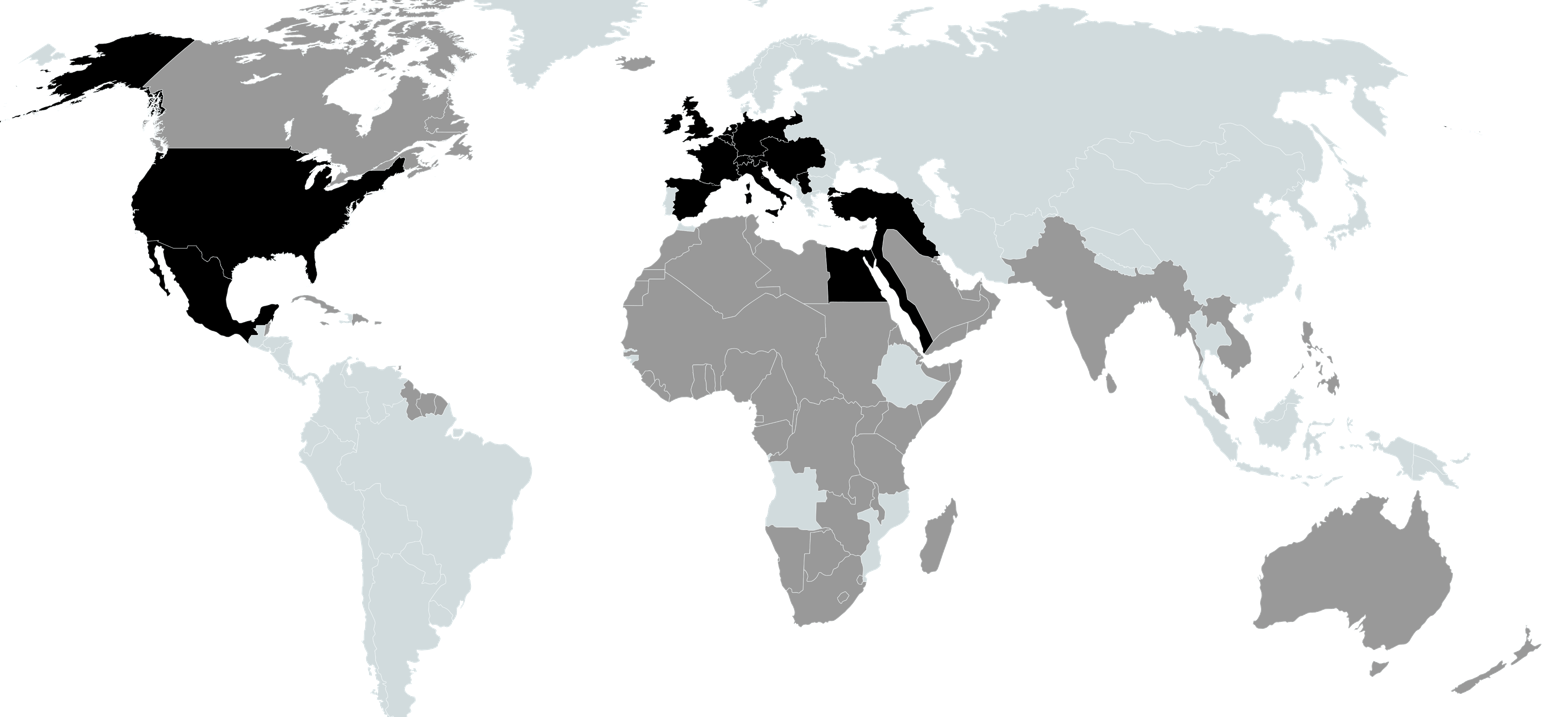
In black, where delegates at the London Congress came from, in grey, what countries were part of the colonial empires of the countries sending delegates

The Anti-authoritarian International underwent several evolutions throughout its history; as the first anarchist organization, it developed many of the movement's central tenets as they emerged. It also faced heavy state repression; for instance, it was banned in France by the Dufaure Law (1872), which punished any French citizen holding a position within the organization with five years' imprisonment or was harshly repressed in Germany and Italy. In response to this significant crackdown, anarchists began to theorize new forms of political action, such as propaganda of the deed, a strategy seeking to carry out spectacular or striking actions to incite the population to revolt and spark a revolution. One of the anarchist figures experiencing repression and a significant supporter of this strategy was Errico Malatesta.

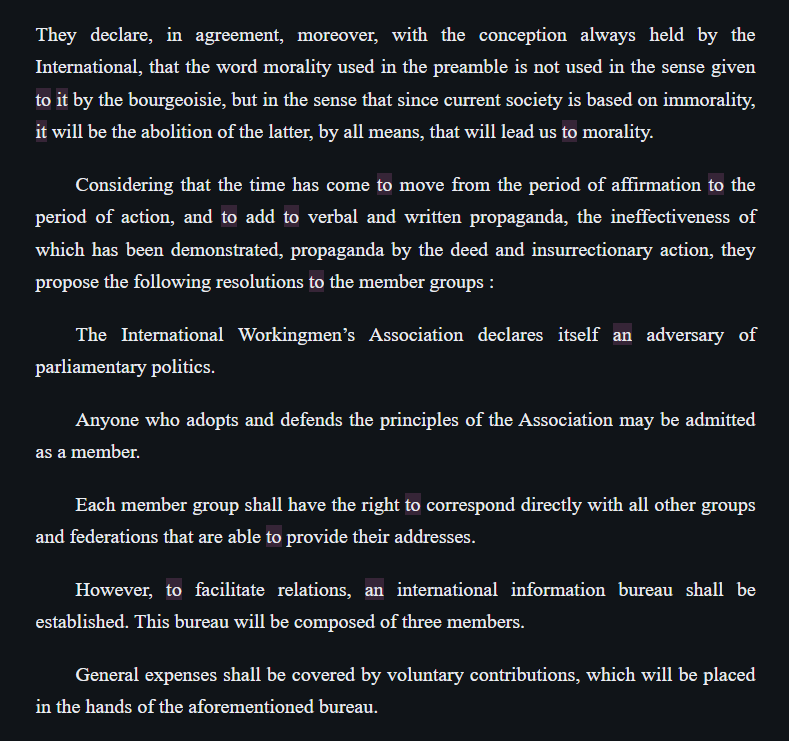
Parts of the resolutions of the London Congress as given by Kropotkin in Le Révolté (1881)

This strategy was hotly debated between the late 1870s and the early 1880s, even as the Anti-authoritarian International was losing members and generally fading from the scene. Propaganda of the deed was not the exclusive domain of anarchists; German revolutionary socialists, many of whom were becoming or would become anarchists, most notably Johann Most, also supported this strategy, which found a certain resonance among anarchists of the period.

In 1881, Most's revolutionary socialists, the anarchists of the Anti-authoritarian International, and various other disparate socialist factions gathered at the London Congress. They voted to refound (or perpetuate) the International on a platform that accepted propaganda of the deed as its central strategy. The formal structures of the International were abolished, save for a correspondence bureau based in London intended to keep groups in contact. The London Congress championed the autonomy of individual groups and actions, decreeing that solidarity should be extended to all revolutionary acts, thus marking the birth of the Black International on anti-organizational lines.

The London Congress, held in the presence of Peter Kropotkin and Malatesta, was not a homogenous one. The anarchists debated there, and Kropotkin opposed Malatesta by generally being much less favorable toward propaganda of the deed and this Black International. However, he was outvoted during the congress, partly by the French and German factions, composed of figures such as Serraux and Louise Michel, who were, on the contrary, very much in favor of the idea. At the end, Malatesta and two other anarchists, Johann Sebastian Trunk and Nikolai Tchaikovsky were named as part of the communication bureau.

=== The Black International in Europe ===
==== The Black International in Switzerland ====
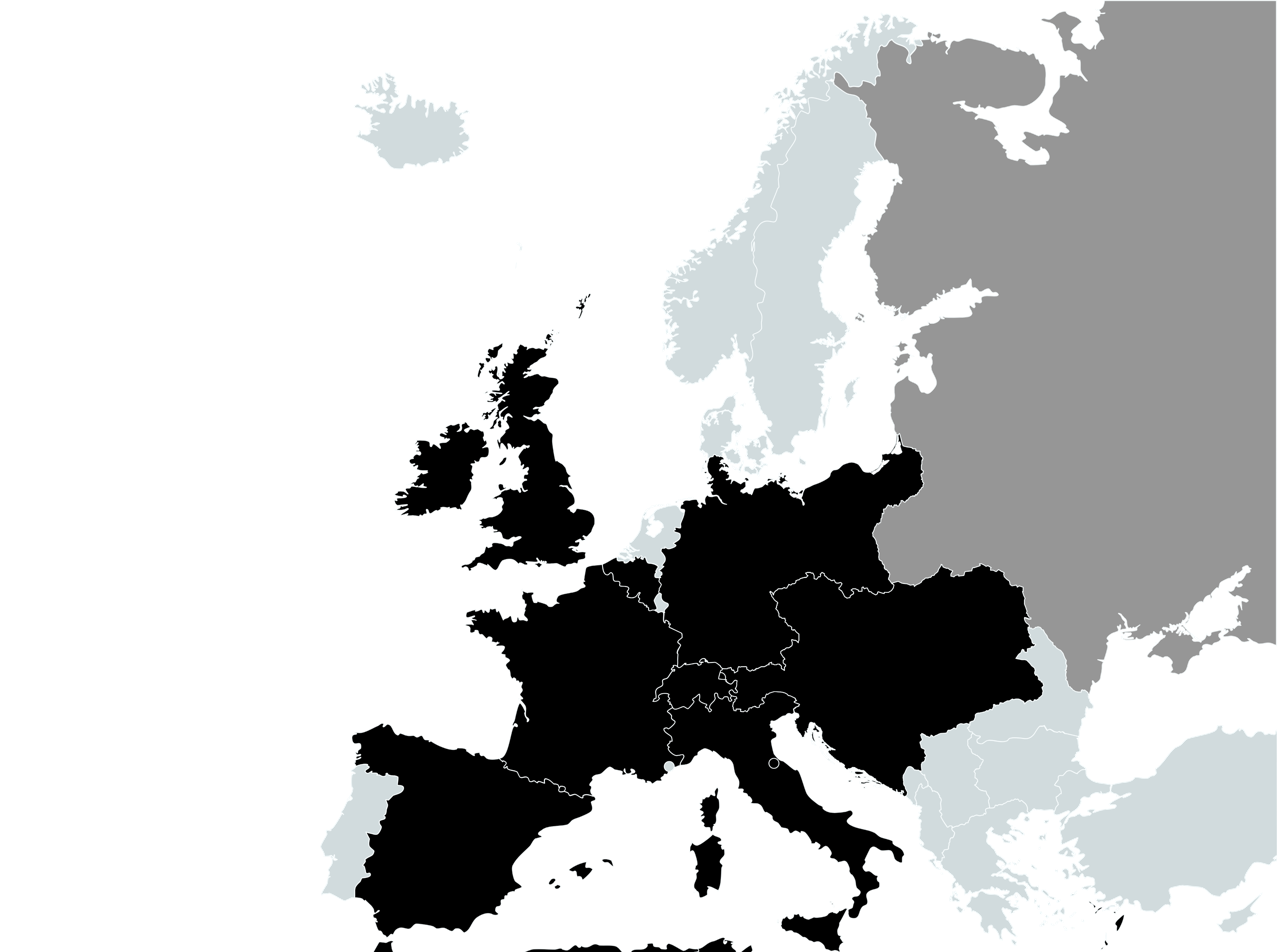
Delegates (black) and other countries heavily discussed (grey) during the International Geneva meeting of August 1882, according to French police reports and Andrew Carlson

Switzerland, where the anarchist movement had been born about a decade earlier, stood at the time as a center of both thought and action. Indeed, the country was officially neutral, though in practice it conducted significant surveillance on anarchists, and was situated at the crossroads of several European powers, namely Germany, Italy, France, and Austria-Hungary. Within the country, the Jura Federation remained active and had participated in the London Congress.

In the period following that congress, the Federation met on several occasions to confirm and even reinforce the decisions made at London. For instance, on 4 June 1882, a Federation congress held in Lausanne, where Emil Werner and Élisée Reclus successfully passed a motion strengthening the London resolutions, bore witness to this evolution. Two months later, on 13 and 14 August 1882, a new international congress intended for the entire organization was held in the city of Geneva, taking advantage of an ongoing music festival to meet discreetly. It was attended by delegates from France, Spain, Italy, Belgium, Germany, Austria, etc., and was organized to coordinate the revolutionary action between the anarchist movement in each country. According to French police reports on the event given by informant Droz, the Black International would have decided there the total separation of anarchists from socialists and also the means of revolutionary action they should adopt, which would have included :

1. The organization of strikes in all industrial centers as quickly as possible; 2. The use of pyrotechnics: dynamite, etc.; 3. In the event of action, the seizure of all army officers, to be held as hostages and partially executed; 4. The destruction by fire, preferably using petroleum, of all public buildings, including barracks; 5. Finally and above all, as a primary measure, the looting of public funds and of wealthy individuals; the immediate takeover of all industrial establishments, stores, and distribution centers.

Furthermore, the congresses and the organization of propaganda of the deed or revolutionary activities continued in the country, for instance, in August 1883, German and Austrian anarchists gathered for a secret meeting in St. Gallen to prepare a series of attacks or actions to be carried out in Austria and the German Empire.

==== The Black International in Germany ====
===== Divisions of the German clubs in London and increasing inefficiency =====
Although most German anarchists were fervent supporters of propaganda of the deed, and were therefore entirely in line with the strategy of the London Congress, divisions began to affect them starting in the 1880s.

Indeed, two groups, overlapping anarcho-collectivist lines on one side, and anarcho-communist lines on the other, with Johann Most, Victor Dave, and John Neve on one hand, and Josef Peukert, Otto Rinke, or Balthasar Grün on the other, began to clash over both theoretical questions and personal rivalries.

Because of these divisions, known as the Bruderkrieg (Brothers' War), the Germans became increasingly ineffective throughout the 1880s. Ultimately, this rift caused the collapse of the German movement for decades to come, when most of the involved 'leaders' left the movement.

==== The Black International in France ====
The International and anarchist groups along the French-Swiss border in the early 1880s.

In parallel, Kropotkin, disgusted by the outcome of the London Congress and expelled from Switzerland by a decree of the Federal Council dated 23 August 1881, decided to return to France. There, new political events, specifically the amnesty of the Communards (1879-1880) and their return from exile or deportation, were giving fresh momentum to revolutionary and more specifically anarchist circles.

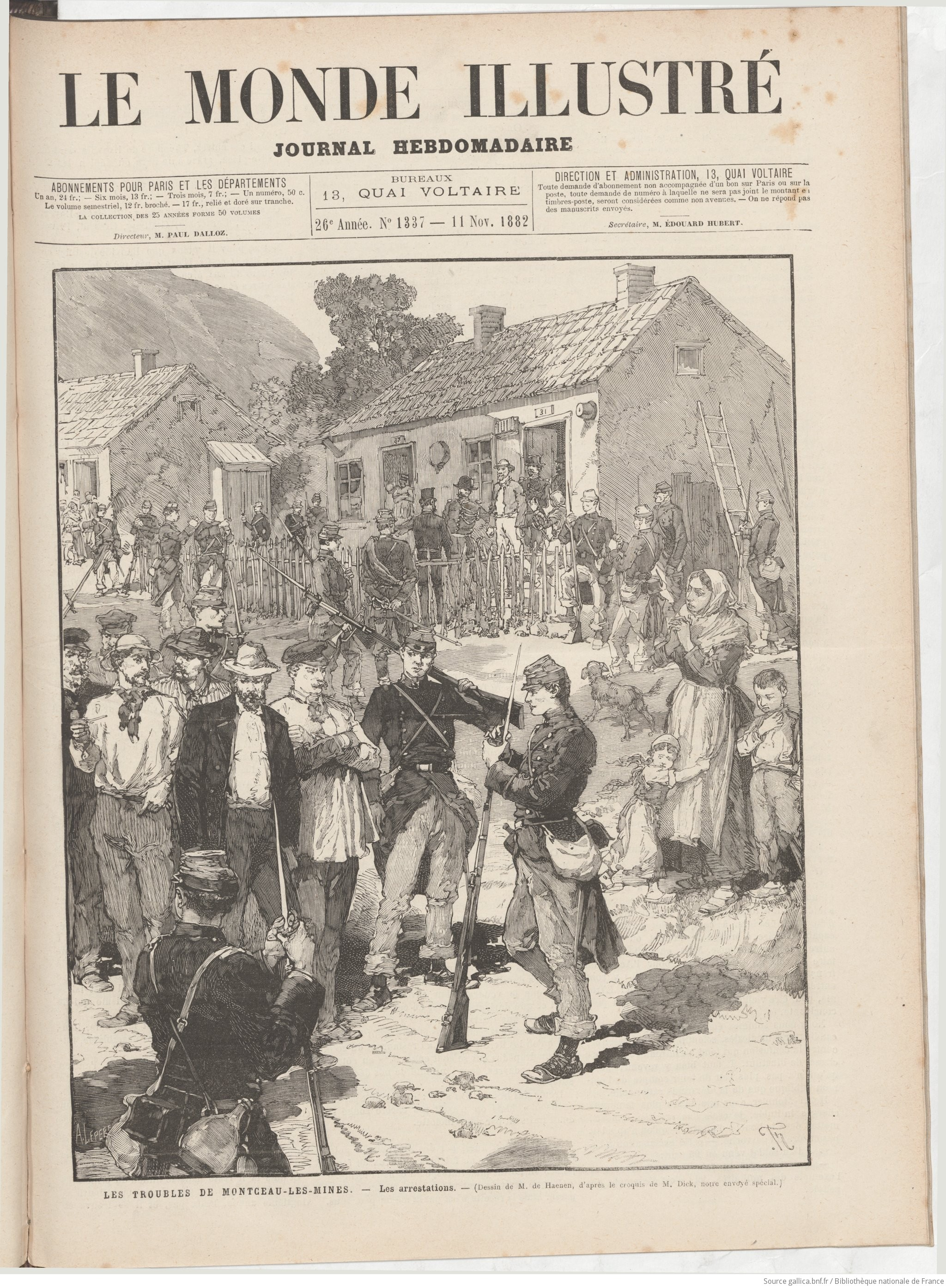
Arrests and raids by the French army in Montceau-les-Mines, Le Monde illustré (4 November 1882)

According to historian Dominique Petit, the amnesty potentially led anarchists to believe that the State was more reluctant to relaunch a crackdown based on the Dufaure Law of 1872, which had been used at the time to suppress the Commune - explaining why they would have been less keen in hiding the International. While in France, Kropotkin traveled a lot and met several anarchists who were setting up groups, some in private meetings and some in more public ones. During this period, the anarchist movement was growing rapidly in Lyon and the surrounding regions, aided by the split within the Federation of the Socialist Workers of France (FTSF) between anarchists, such as Toussaint Bordat and Philippe Sanlaville, on one hand, and reformist socialists on the other. It also saw the birth of the first period of the Lyon anarchist press (1882-1884).

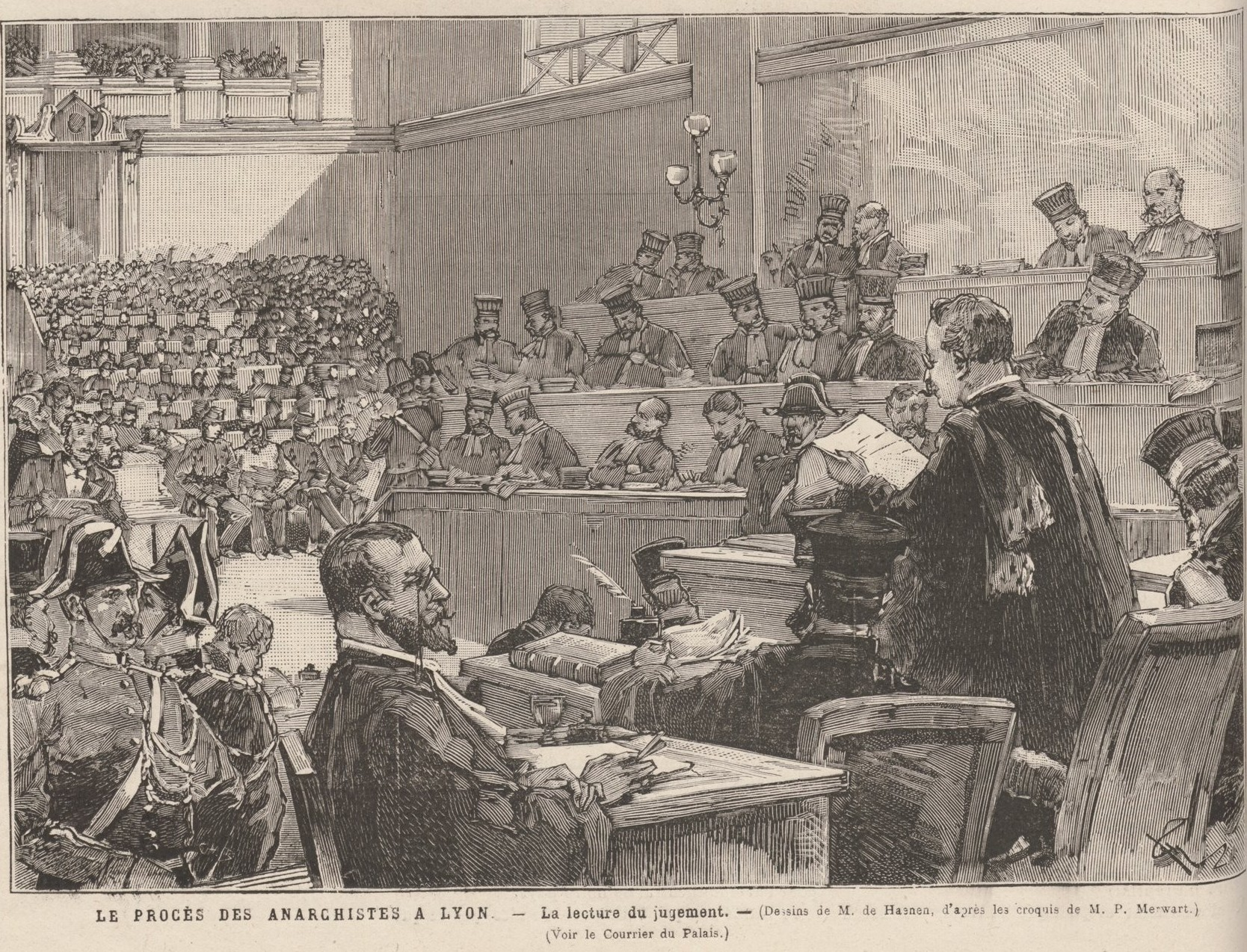
The Trial of the 66 in Le Monde illustré of 27 January 1883

Furthermore, republican paramilitary organizations, such as the Comité de la rue de Grolée in Lyon or the Black Band in Montceau-les-Mines, composed of armed and radical members accustomed to monitoring security forces and possessing networks across the country, gradually evolved toward anarchism and bolstered the anarchist ranks, causing a surge of activity for the movement in this region and deeply penetrating French territory. Reflecting on the ground gained by the anarchists in the early 1880s, the special police commissaire in charge of the whole region wrote at the time:

It is indisputable that over the last six months, anarchist groups have gained significantly, not only numerically but also in terms of revolutionary propaganda and action. This party [...] is becoming increasingly aggressive and audacious.

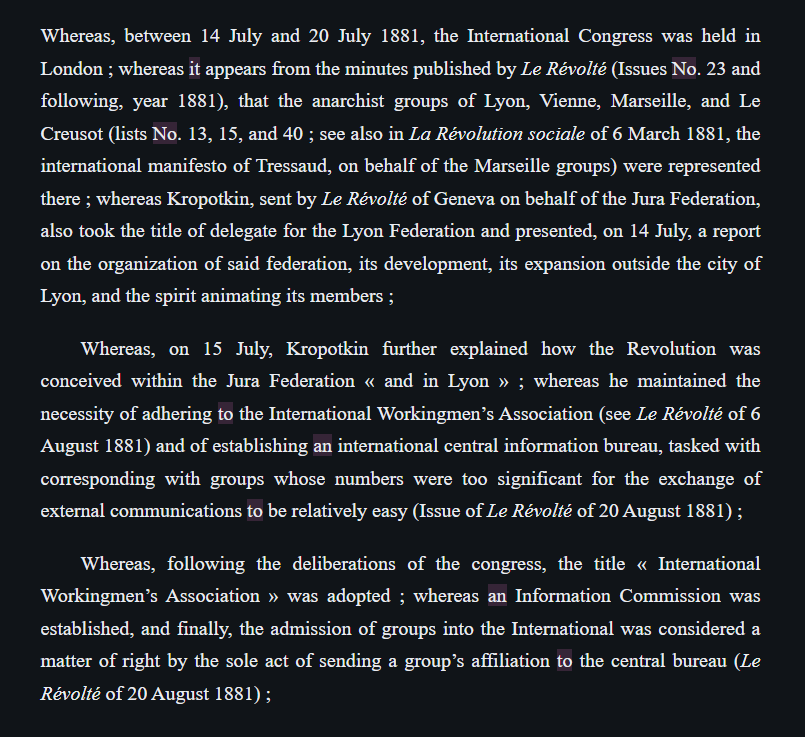
Parts of the rationale of the judge at the trial of the 66, opening his part on the Black International affiliation

Indeed, the situation in the region and in France became increasingly unstable starting in 1882; tensions escalated continuously between the state and the anarchists, particularly around Lyon. This situation was further exacerbated by the severe famine striking the city during this period, which forced children to beg for food in front of military barracks for their families.

During the first half of the year, two anarchist workers, Florian and Pierre Fournier, fired upon their employers and were celebrated in the anarchist press. Subsequently, numerous members of the Lyon Revolutionary Federation attended the international congress in Geneva in August 1882; according to the French authorities, a delegate from the Montceau-les-Mines miners also attended, declaring that the European revolution would be launched in his region the following day.

The very next day, the Montceau-les-Mines troubles began, a period in the Saône-et-Loire mining basin marked by insurrections and dozens of propaganda of the deed attacks, initiated by the Black Band as it launched itself into action, effectively moving the French security apparatus towards its Eastern regions.

The French state reacted with a major wave of repression, cracking down on the Lyon movement and attempting to incarcerate its members. Furthermore, police authorities undertook political maneuvers during this period to imprison as many anarchists as possible, even on dubious grounds, such as when Sanlaville was re-arrested following the Trial of the 66 in 1883. This repression, far from halting anarchist activities, instead provoked a violent reaction on their part. On 22 October 1882, shortly before the first trial of the Black Band, Fanny Madignier and at least two other accomplices detonated explosives at the Assommoir restaurant, a venue frequented by the Lyon bourgeoisie; this was the first lethal anarchist attack in France, though the intent to kill isn't clearly established.

On the same day, unknown assailants threw dynamite cartridges in front of the prefecture in Montpellier, though there were no casualties. The following day, the Vitriolerie bombing occurred, targeting an army recruitment building in Lyon; this attack also resulted in no victims. Meanwhile, the trade unions of joiners, cabinetmakers, and carpenters in the Île-de-France, organizations composed of a large number of anarchists, went on strike.

A wide-scale crackdown then began, marked by the arrest of numerous anarchists and the launch of raids throughout the country. Contrary to any fears they may have had of being tried for the bombings, the repression was based on membership in the Black International using the Dufaure Law. By leveraging communications, meetings, and ties to the London Congress among the various groups, French authorities brought 66 defendants to trial in early 1883: this became known as the Trial of the 66. The trial took place in January 1883 in Lyon. Some anarchists, such as Auguste Ebersold, were not present as they had managed to escape, but the raids placed dozens of others on the defendants' bench. Among the key figures accused at the trial were Toussaint Bordat, Peter Kropotkin, Alexandre Tressaud, Philippe Sanlaville, with other interesting ones, like Nicolas Didelin, the cousin of Louise Michel, who was herself present at the London Congress.

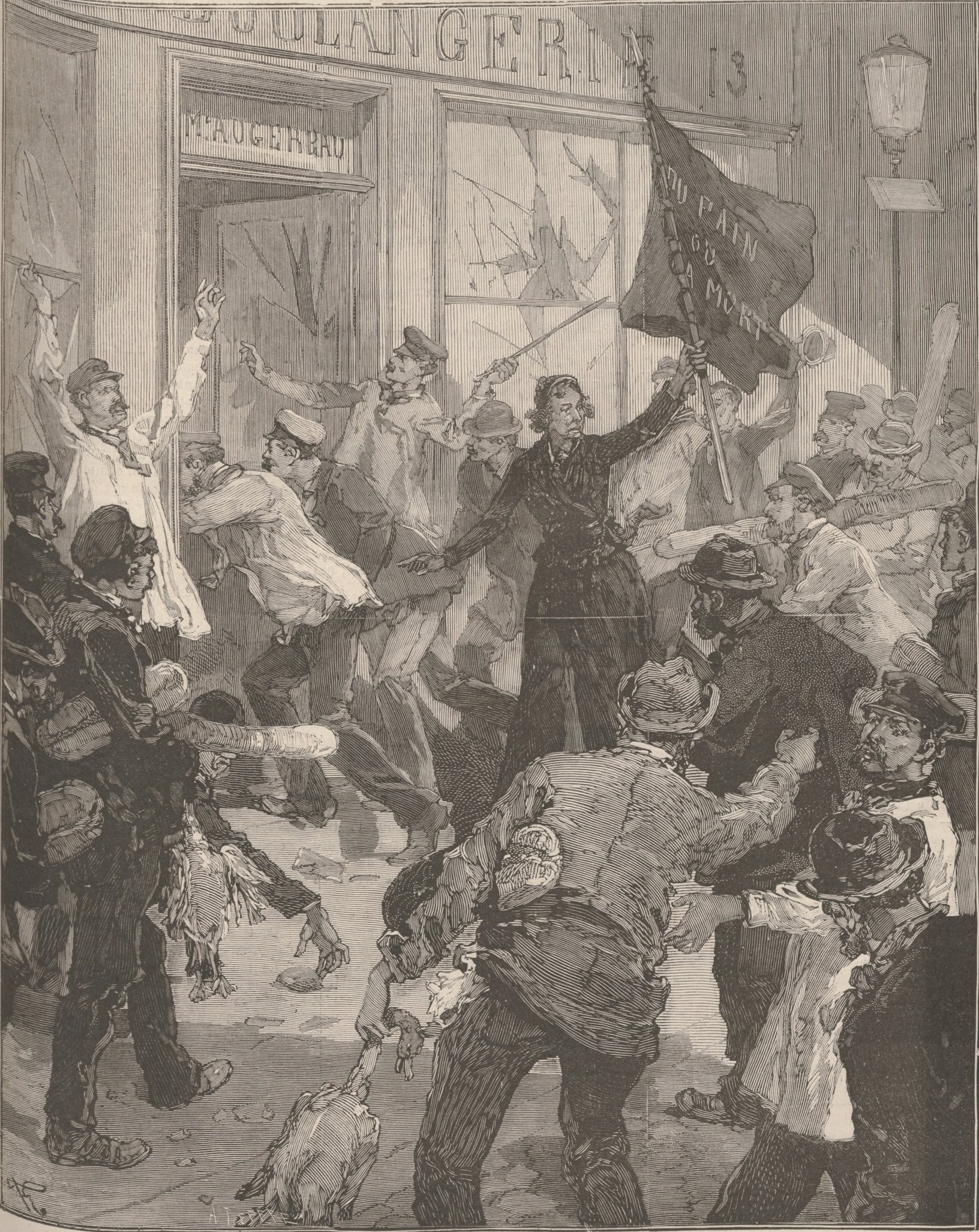
Front page of Le Monde illustré depicting Louise Michel carrying the black flag with the motto 'Bread or Death' and inciting demonstrators to loot a bakery (17 March 1883).

During his closing argument, the prosecutor relied heavily on the anarchist press, specifically La Révolution sociale, Le Révolté, L’Étendard révolutionnaire, and Le Droit social. He also produced numerous seized letters exchanged between the anarchists involved, which, according to his argument, served as evidence of their membership in the Black International. The London Congress, its resolutions, and its underlying philosophy also formed a point of particular interest in his speech. For their part, the anarchists presented the trial as an assault on the anarchist movement as a whole, a wave of repression they claimed had nothing to do with the International, with most (though not all) maintaining that such an organization did not even exist - they also made a famous speech describing anarchism and its tenets which was republished later on. Among the speeches highlighted by the anarchist press, the interventions of Bordat and Kropotkin were particularly noted. Bordat spoke for several hours, producing, among other things, documents provided by spies within the police headquarters to support his claim that his co-defendant Valadier was an informant who had sold out the Lyon federation. Kropotkin, meanwhile, argued that the proceedings were a class trial directed against the proletariat. Michel attended the final sessions of the trial, during which the presiding judge received dozens of death threats sent from Italy and Germany, including one letter that stated:

If you condemn my unfortunate colleagues from Saint-Étienne, Montceau-les-Mines, Blanzy, and Lyon, and indeed all those who have taken part in anarchism, I swear on the honor of my ancestors that within four years, you shall perish. Woe to you and to all those who condemn my friends. I am still unknown to you, but you will know me in four years at the latest.

Ultimately, of the 66 defendants, 14 of whom (20%) were fugitives, all but five were convicted. Sentences ranged from a few months in prison to the maximum penalty allowed by law for the affiliation to the International for those deemed most responsible, such as Kropotkin or Bordat. Those who managed to escape also received particularly harsh sentences. In total, the court handed down 165 years of imprisonment and a sum of 50,000 francs (≃250,000 USD of 2026), a considerable amount for the time.

While some of the convicted anarchists filed appeals, Michel returned to Paris, where she published La Vengeance Anarchiste and reunited with the carpenters' union of the Île-de-France region. A few days before the appeal ruling in March 1883, Michel and this union organized the demonstration of 9 March 1883. It was a particularly insurrectionary event, during which the crowd marched on the French Ministry of the Interior and the Élysée Palace, the seat of the French president, before being pushed back at the very last moment. This demonstration became famous for Michel's use of the black flag. After successfully evading capture, she eventually surrendered to the police.

Four days later, the appeal of the Trial of the 66 reduced the sentences of a number of convicts (about twenty) and introduced new considerations that the initial judge had completely ignored, such as mitigating circumstances (age, intent, etc.). However, it kept the sentences of the 'figures' intact, as well as those of the defendants who had received the lightest penalties.

=== The Black International in America ===
==== US context ====
In 1876, most of the major American socialist organizations merged into the Workingmen's Party of the United States (WPUS). In 1877, the WPUS was renamed to the Socialist Labor Party of America (SLP).

During its first years, the SLP had very slow progress and few electoral victories. This proved frustrating and demoralizing for many Sections of the SLP. These sections began to debate the question of armed struggle and to organize paramilitary Lehr-und-Wehr Vereine lit. 'Education and Defense Societies'. This more aggressive revolutionary socialist movement was particularly strong in the tough industrial center of Chicago, populated by a large number of German-speaking immigrants cognizant of the European revolutionary movement and its German-based propaganda literature.

Anarchists and revolutionary socialists (who in the vernacular of the day called themselves "Social Revolutionists") were united by their disdain with electoral politics and piecemeal ameliorative reform. Tepid changes, such as currency reform, civil service reform, state ownership of public works, and reduction of the tariff were dismissed as inconsequential. Only through the application of armed force would revolutionary transformation of American society and economy be possible. These groups formed various independent revolutionary clubs.

The London gathering was attended by a New York social revolutionary group, which upon returning to America called for a gathering of American revolutionary groups in Chicago. The 1881 Chicago convention which followed adopted for itself the name Revolutionary Socialist Party and approved a platform urging the formation of trade unions on "communistic" principles and urging that support only be lent to unions of a "progressive" character. The platform also denounced use of the ballot as a vehicle for revolutionary social change, declaring instead that elections were "an invention of the bourgeoisie to fool the workers." Instead, it would be "armed organizations of workingmen who stand ready with the gun to resist encroachment upon their rights" which were pivotal, the platform declared.

==== Creation of the Revolutionary Socialists ====
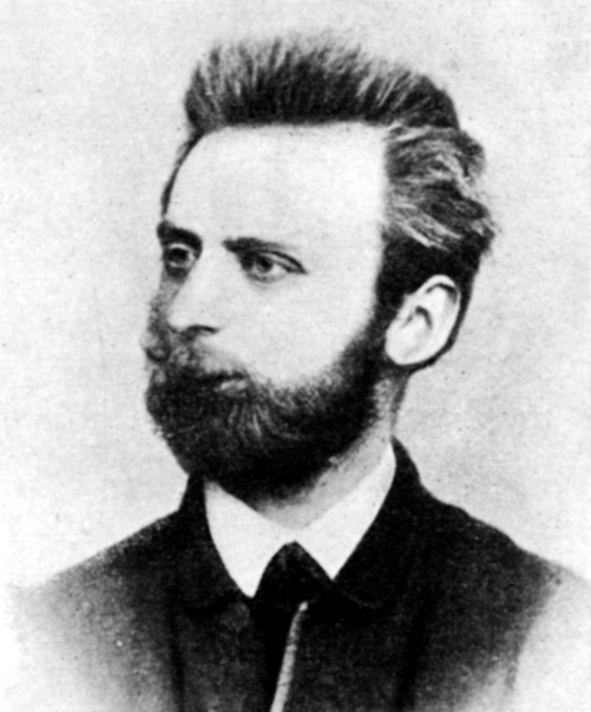
Anarchist journalist and orator Johann Most as a young man

In 1881, US sympathizers of the IWPA held the 1881 Chicago Social Revolutionary Congress. This congress was chiefly organized by the New York Social Revolutionary Club and numerous other "revolutionary clubs" formed by anarchist-oriented members who split from the SLP. This congress formalized itself as either the Revolutionary Socialist Labor Party (RSLP) or Revolutionary Socialist Party (RSP), but did not merge all of its sub-organizations together.

A key turning-point came in December 1882 with the arrival in America of Johann Most, a former parliamentary representative of the Social Democratic Party of Germany who had turned to anarchism. Most had just finished up a 16-month term of imprisonment for having glorified the assassination of Russian Tsar Alexander II and urged its emulation in his newspaper, Freiheit (Freedom). A popular orator and brilliant journalist in the German language, Most's arrival was celebrated by an enthusiastic crowd in the great hall of the Cooper Union Institute in New York City. A tour of the principal industrial cities of America by Most followed in early 1883, a successful venture which led to the formation of a number of new local anarchist groups.

Further aiding the anarchist cause, Most brought with him to New York City his newspaper, Freiheit (Freedom), which uncompromisingly advocated struggle against state authority, widening the gap between the electorally oriented socialists of the Socialist Labor Party and the burgeoning movement of "Social Revolutionists".

==== Creation of the US IWPA ====
In 1883, the split between the SLP and the social revolutionists and anarchist was formalized, when the groups held separate conventions, in Baltimore, Maryland, and Pittsburgh, Pennsylvania, respectively. The October 1883 convention of the anarchists and revolutionary socialists held in Pittsburgh was attended by representatives of groups in 26 cities, including among them Johann Most, August Spies, and Albert R. Parsons.

The Pittsburgh conclave formally merged the social revolutionary organizations together and launched the International Working People's Association (IWPA) in America. The convention adopted a manifesto known as the Pittsburgh Proclamation, declaring the organization for "destruction of the existing class rule by all means" and for the establishment of an economic system based upon "free contracts between the autonomous (independent) communes and associations, resting upon a federalistic basis." An "Information Bureau" in Chicago was established to coordinate the activity of the "loose-knit federation of autonomous groups" declaring allegiance to the organization.

Delegates to the Pittsburgh convention agreed in the efficacy of armed force, but differed as to its function. Eastern delegates surrounding Johann Most argued in favor of the "propaganda of the deed"—individualistic acts of terrorism which would win alienated workers to the anarchist cause through the power of example. Western-based delegates such as Spies and Parsons argued instead for a primary emphasis on work in trade unions as the vehicle for revolutionary change, dismissing the labor movement's obsessive concern with immediate demands but insisting that the direct action of unions would be key in establishing the embryonic production groups of the new society. This mixture of anarchism and syndicalism would be known as the "Chicago Idea".

==== Growth ====
The IWPA grew steadily in America from the time of its launch in the fall of 1883, reaching a peak of about 5,000 members. The majority of these members were immigrants hailing from Europe, primarily Germany. The circulation of Most's newspaper, Freiheit, increased handsomely, while some important German-language newspapers transferred their loyalties from the SLP to the new organization.

Meanwhile, the Socialist Labor Party withered on the vine, with its membership plummeting to just 1,500 and its National Secretary, Philip Van Patten, leaving a mysterious suicide note and disappearing, only to reemerge later in another city as a government employee. At its December 1883 Baltimore convention, the SLP took the extraordinary, albeit short-lived, step of abolishing the role of National Secretary altogether and adopting a particularly radical program in hopes of cobbling together some sort of organizational unity with the so-called "Internationalists" of the IWPA. Ultimately, however, the SLP determined that the difference over the question of violence between itself and the IWPA made unification impossible and a polemic war against anarchism was launched.

=== The Black International in Africa ===
==== The Black International in Egypt ====
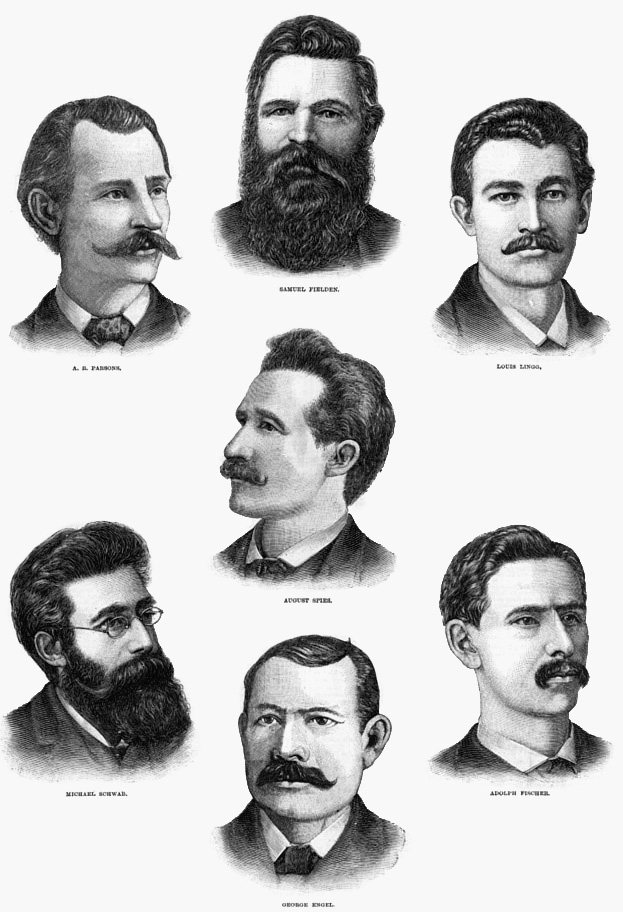
Death sentences handed down to seven prominent Chicago anarchist leaders in conjunction with the 1886 Haymarket bombing effectively stunted and dispersed the IWPA in the US.

The Egyptian Federation of the International Workingmen's Association's sent a delegate to the London Congress.

Malatesta, in charge of the organization's communications office, left London during the summer of 1882, even as events in France were unfolding, to travel to Egypt, where he had already been a few years earlier. He joined the Anglo-Egyptian War there, without success, and returned to Europe, most specifically to Italy, in 1883. According to French police informants within London's anarchist circles, his absence was viewed with suspicion and curiosity within the movement and the International; most members, as well as the French police, were unaware of his whereabouts and wondered if it might be better to replace him at the communications office, despite him being its central and best-known figure.

=== Repression, agents provocateurs : decline of the organization in Europe and the United States ===
Specifically in France, the repression of early 1883 pushed anarchists to dismantle any remaining structures. While they had previously belonged to relatively identifiable federations in Lyon and the East, they adopted anti-organizational measures and dissolved these final structures to evade repression.

In the aftermath of the 1886 Haymarket bombing and the repression launched against prominent leaders of the American anarchist movement such as English-language newspaper editor Albert Parsons and German-language newspaper editor August Spies, American sections of the IWPA began to disintegrate rapidly. At least a portion of the American anarchist movement, at least one historian believes, came over to the more moderate Socialist Labor Party in the aftermath of the Chicago debacle.

The anarchist movement dissipated severely following the execution of the Haymarket leaders in 1887. Although The Alarm continued to be published in Chicago for a time, sympathizers and advertisers were scared off by the harsh repression and public approbation meted out to the anarchist leaders. A few small anarchist groups survived, however, notably those surrounding Johann Most and Benjamin Tucker and their respective newspapers, Freiheit and Liberty, published in New York and Boston.

After its decline, it was replaced by other forms of coordination and organization, such as anarchist companionship.

== Legacy ==
=== Other organizations ===
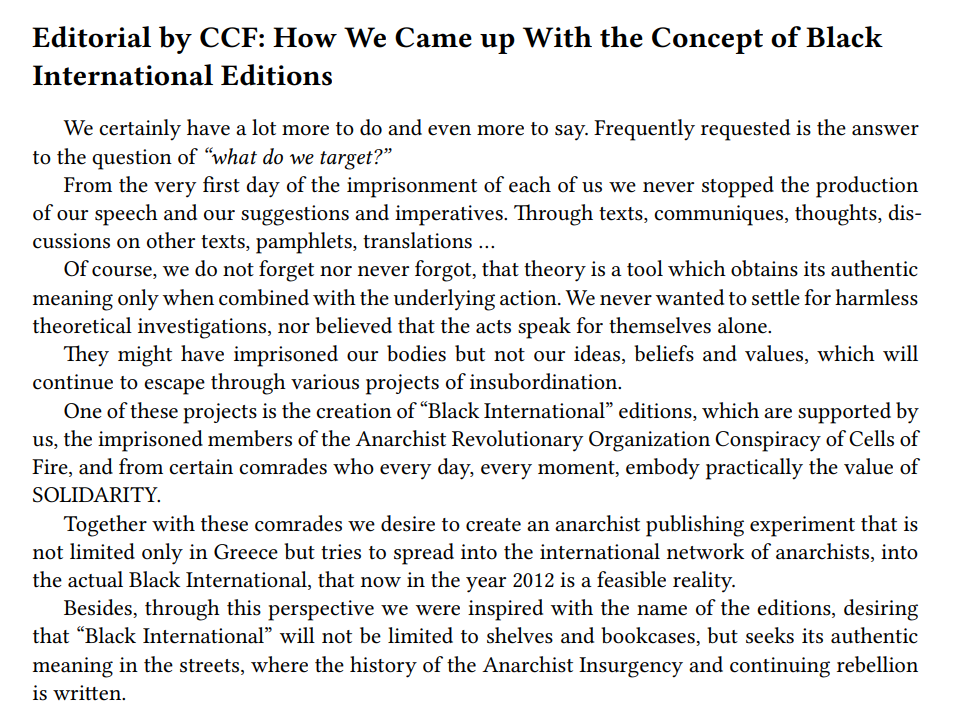
Editorial of the Conspiracy of Cells of Fire reusing the Black International terminology on The Anarchist Library (2012)

The International Working People's Association (the so-called "Black International") is not to be confused with the International Workingmen's Association (IWA) established by Burnette G. Haskell and others on July 15, 1881, which borrowed its name from the First International. While discussions were held regarding a merger of these two organizations, talks came to naught. Haskell's IWA (known informally as the "Red International") disappeared at the end of the 1890s.

An effort was made to revive the International Working People's Association by a convention of anarchists held in Amsterdam in 1907, but the organization was essentially stillborn. A final move to relaunch the IWPA, more successful than the 1907 effort, was made in December 1921 at another convention of international anarchists held in Berlin.

=== Police fears ===
During the Ère des attentats (1892–1894), French authorities were paranoid that they were facing a resurgence of the Black International, believing it had never actually disappeared, which would explain the bombings. Consequently, they sought to infiltrate London circles by sending numerous informants, even though the Black International was dead and many London-based anarchists did not support the use of propaganda of the deed during this period anymore.

== Publications ==
=== American newspapers associated with the IWPA ===
- The Alarm, Chicago, October 1884 – December 1888?.
- Chicagoer Arbeiter-Zeitung (Chicago Workers' News), Chicago, June 1874 – 1924? (Anarchist: 1880–1886).
- The Labor Enquirer, Denver, Colorado, 1882–1888.
- Die Fackel (The Torch), Chicago, May 1879 – October 1919 (Anarchist: 1880–1886).
- Freedom, Chicago, November 1890 – May 1892.
- Freiheit (Freedom), London, Berlin, Exeter, New York, Chicago, Hoboken, and Buffalo, January 1879 – August 1910.
- Liberty, Boston, August 1881 – April 1908.
- Lucifer, the Light-Bearer, Valley Falls, Kansas, Topeka, and Chicago, 1883 – June 1907.
- Truth: A Journal for the Poor, San Francisco, 1881 – December 1884.
- Der Vorbote (The Harbinger), Chicago, February 1874 – April 1924 (Anarchist: 1880–1886).

Sources: Richard T. Ely, Recent American Socialism, pp. 31, 32, 36. Dirk Hoerder with Christiane Harzig (eds.), The Immigrant Labor Press in North America, 1840s–1970s: An Annotated Bibliography. Westport, CT: Greenwood Press, 1987; Volume 3, pp. 389-390, 407-408, 411-413.

=== Pamphlet literature ===
- "'To the Workingmen of America."' Chicago: International Working People's Association, 1883. 4-page leaflet.
- Victor Hugo! His Two Messages: One to the Rich, the Other to the Poor. Chicago?: International Working People's Association, n.d. [1880s].
- William J. Gorsuch, Revolt! An American to Americans... Allegheny, PA: [IWPA] Group No. 1, 1885.

== See also ==
=== Key members ===
- Samuel Fielden
- Johann Most
- Albert Parsons
- Michael Schwab
- August Spies

=== Other anarchist internationals and international networks ===
- Anti-authoritarian International (1872–1877)
- International Workers Association (1922–)
- International of Anarchist Federations (1968–)
- Black Bridge International (2001–2004)
- International Libertarian Solidarity (2001–2005)
- Anarkismo.net (2005–)

== Primary sources ==
- International Working People's Association, "The Pittsburgh Proclamation." Corvallis, OR: 1000 Flowers Publishing, 2006.
- Parsons, Albert R. Anarchism: Its Philosophy and Scientific Basis as Defined by Some of its Apostles. Chicago: Mrs. A.R. Parsons, 1887.
- Life of Albert R. Parsons, with Brief History of the Labor Movement in America. Chicago: Lucy E. Parsons, 1889.

== Bibliography ==
- Bantman, Constance (2014), "« Anarchistes de la bombe, anarchistes de l'idée » : les anarchistes français à Londres, 1880-1895" ['Bomb anarchists, idea anarchists': French anarchists in London, 1880-1895], Le Mouvement Social, 246 (1), Paris: 47–61, doi:10.3917/lms.246.0047
- Baylac, Marie-Hélène (2024), Louise Michel, Paris: Perrin, ISBN 978-2262097714
- Bébin, Lionel (1996), Les tentatives de reconstituer la Première Internationale et les débuts du mouvement anarchiste à Lyon (mémoire) [The Attempts to Reconstruct the First International and the Beginnings of the Anarchist Movement in Lyon, 1871–1881 (memoir)], Lyon: University Lyon II
- Bouhey, Vivien (2008), Les Anarchistes contre la République [The Anarchists against the Republic], Rennes: Presses universitaires de Rennes (PUR)
- Cahm, Caroline (1989), Kropotkin and the rise of revolutionary anarchism, 1872-1886, Cambridge; New York: Cambridge University Press (CUP), ISBN 0-521-36445-0
- Carlson, Andrew (1972), Anarchism in Germany, vol. 1, Metuchen, N. J.: The Scarecrow Press, Inc., ISBN 0-8 108-0484-0
- Eisenzweig, Uri (2001). Fictions de l'anarchisme [Fictions of anarchism] (in French). France: C. Bourgois. ISBN 2-267-01570-6.
- Enckell, Marianne (2012), La Fédération jurassienne, Genève - Paris: Entremonde, ISBN 978-2-940426-16-4
- Graham, Robert (2019), "Anarchism and the First International", The Palgrave Handbook of Anarchism, Cham: Palgrave Macmillan, pp. 323–340, ISBN 978-3-319-75619-6
- Marshall, Peter H. (2008) [1992]. Demanding the Impossible: A History of Anarchism. London: Harper Perennial. ISBN 978-0-00-686245-1. OCLC 218212571.
- Pernicone, Nunzio (1993), Italian anarchism: 1864-1892, Princeton: Princeton University Press (PUP), ISBN 978-1904859970
- Trautmann, Frederic, The Voice of Terror: A Biography of Johann Most. Westport, CT: Greenwood Press, 1980.
- Turcato, Davide (2012), Making sense of anarchism ; Errico Malatesta's experiments with revolution, 1889--1900, London: Palgrave Macmillan, ISBN 978-0-230-30179-5
