= Martial Bourdin =

French anarchist (1868–1894)

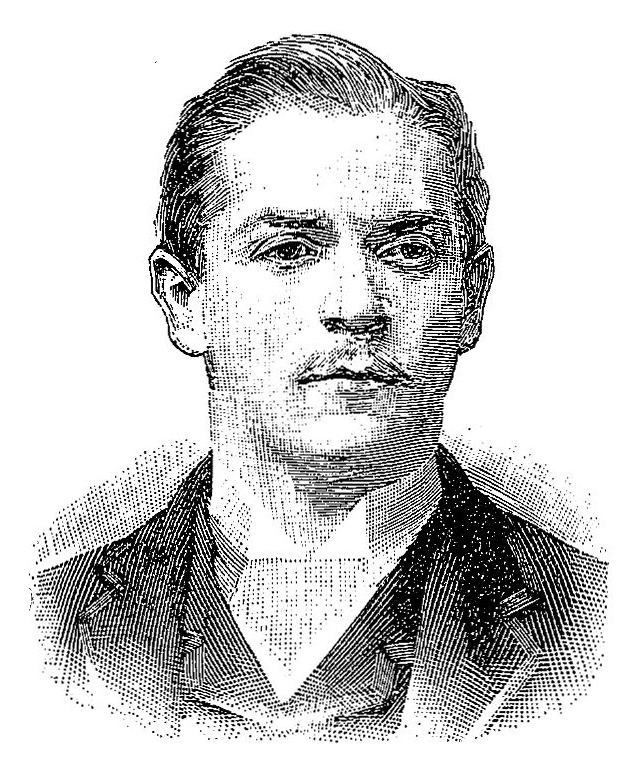
- Born: 1868; Tours, France
- Died: 15 February 1894 (aged 25–26); Greenwich Hospital, London, England
- Other name: J. Allder
- Occupation: Tailor
- Movement: Anarchism

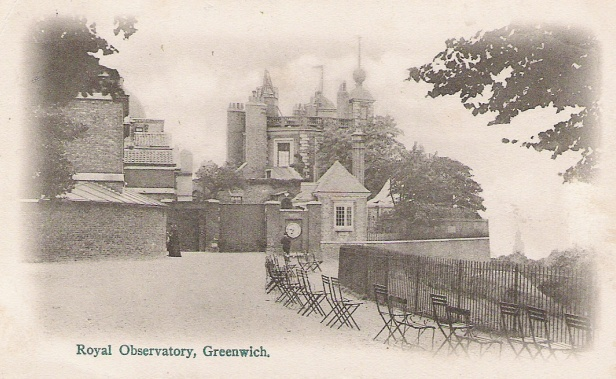
The Royal Observatory, Greenwich c. 1902, as depicted on a postcard

Martial Bourdin (1868 – 15 February 1894) was a French anarchist, noted for his attempt to bomb Greenwich Observatory. He sustained fatal injuries when his bomb exploded prematurely as he was carrying it through Greenwich Park, London.

== Biography ==
Bourdin was a member of the anarchist tailors' group L’Aiguille, along with his brother Henri. He emigrated from France, working as a women's tailor in Detroit and later London. In London, he and his brother were members of Club Autonomie, a popular club for foreign anarchists.

On 15 February 1894 Bourdin entered Greenwich Park, carrying a small bomb, which exploded in his hand. The explosion completely destroyed his left hand and wrist, and blew a small hole through his abdomen. Although Bourdin had sustained massive injuries, he remained alive and able to speak, but refused to answer questions. He was carried to the Seamen's Hospital nearby, where he died 30 minutes later. Bourdin was buried in the Finchley Road cemetery on 23 February. Fellow Anarchist Louise Michel gave a speech at the funeral.

Later, police investigators discovered that Bourdin had left his room on Fitzroy Street in London and travelled by tram from Westminster to Greenwich Park. The police concluded that "some mischance or miscalculation or some clumsy bungling" had caused the bomb to explode in Bourdin's hand. Because he was found with a large sum of money, the police speculated that he had planned to leave for France immediately.

David Rooney argues that Bourdin intended to destroy the observatory's public clock, with which time clocks throughout Britain were synchronized.

== Legacy ==
Bourdin's gruesome death and the mystery surrounding his attempted act inspired Joseph Conrad's 1907 novel, The Secret Agent. Some scholars believe T. S. Eliot references Bourdin in his Ariel poem "Animula" when he writes "Pray...// For Boudin, blown to pieces," although Eliot uses the spelling "Boudin" and may not have had the anarchist in mind.
