= Albrechtice nad Orlicí =

- Municipality
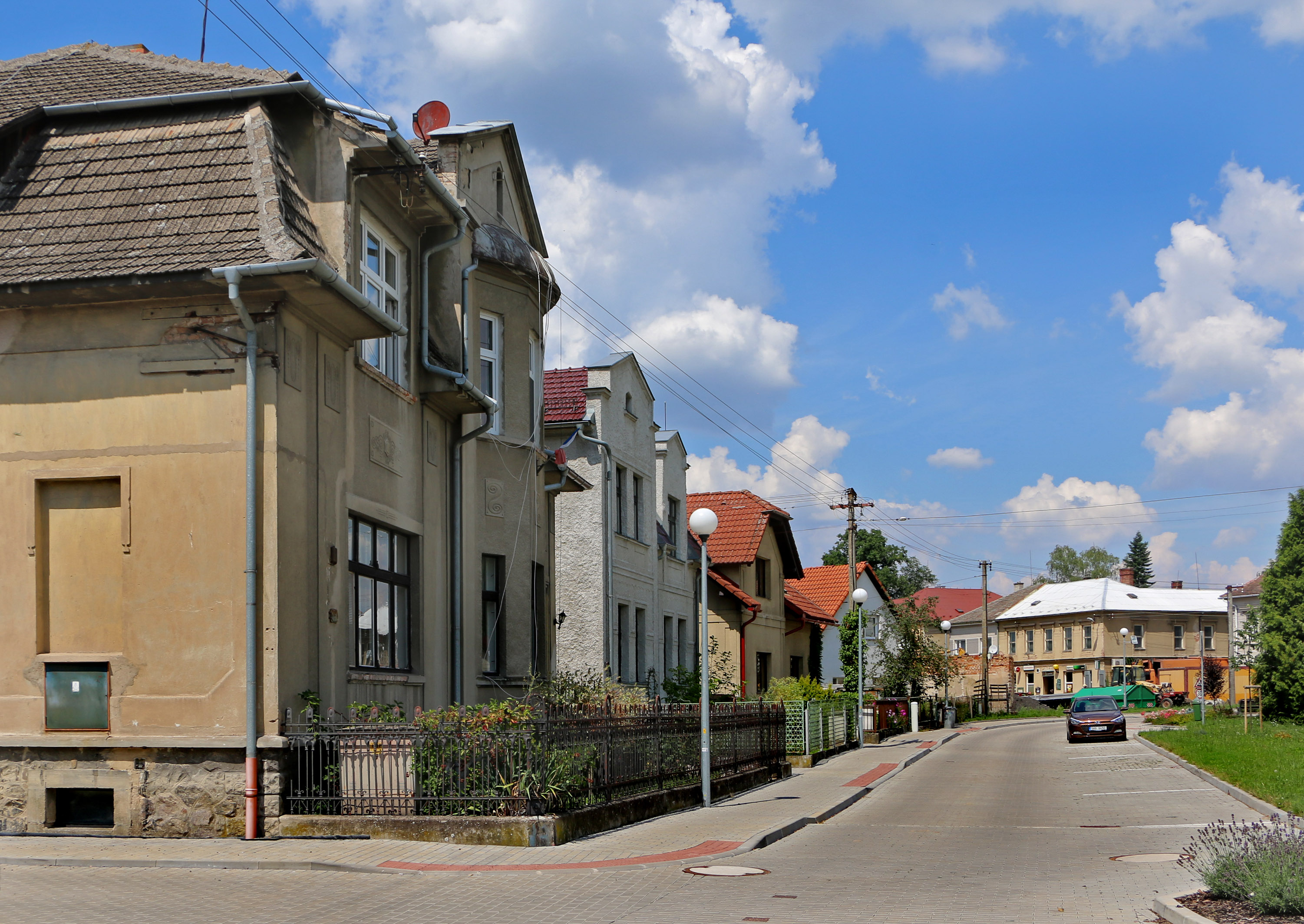
- Centre of Albrechtice nad Orlicí

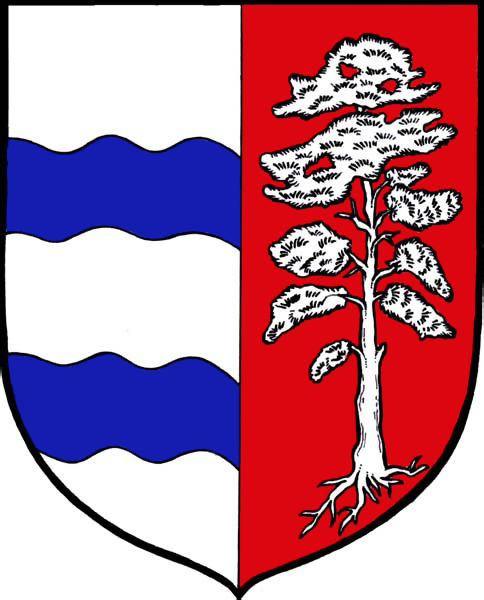
- Flag Coat of arms

- Location in the Czech Republic
- Coordinates: 50°8′23″N 16°3′52″E
- Country: Czech Republic
- Region: Hradec Králové
- District: Rychnov nad Kněžnou
- First mentioned: 1279

Area
  - Total: 5.24 km^{2} (2.02 sq mi)
- Elevation: 250 m (820 ft)

Population (2026-01-01)
  - Total: 1,000
  - Density: 190/km^{2} (490/sq mi)
- Time zone: UTC+1 (CET)
  - Summer (DST): UTC+2 (CEST)
- Postal code: 517 22
- Website: www.albrechtice-nad-orlici.cz

Albrechtice nad Orlicí (German: Albrechtsdorf an der Adler) is a municipality and village in Rychnov nad Kněžnou District in the Hradec Králové Region of the Czech Republic. It has about 1,000 inhabitants.

== Etymology ==
The name Albrechtice is derived from the personal name Albrecht, meaning "the village of Albrecht's people".

== Geography ==
Albrechtice nad Orlicí is located about 17 kilometres (11 mi) southeast of Hradec Králové. It lies in a flat landscape in the Orlice Table. The municipality is situated on the left bank of the Orlice River.

== History ==
The first written mention of Albrechtice is from 1279. Between 1346 and 1378, the village was promoted to a market town. In 1495, it was acquired by Vilém II of Pernštejn. During the rule of the Pernštejn family, Albrechtice lost its significance and the market town title.

== Demographics ==
Historical population

Year	Pop.	±%
1869	335	—
1880	393	+17.3%
1890	403	+2.5%
1900	442	+9.7%
1910	581	+31.4%

Year	Pop.	±%
1921	656	+12.9%
1930	914	+39.3%
1950	908	−0.7%
1961	1,052	+15.9%
1970	981	−6.7%

Year	Pop.	±%
1980	1,000	+1.9%
1991	1,012	+1.2%
2001	990	−2.2%
2011	1,016	+2.6%
2021	1,044	+2.8%

Source: Censuses

== Transport ==
There are no railways or major roads passing through the municipality.

== Sights ==
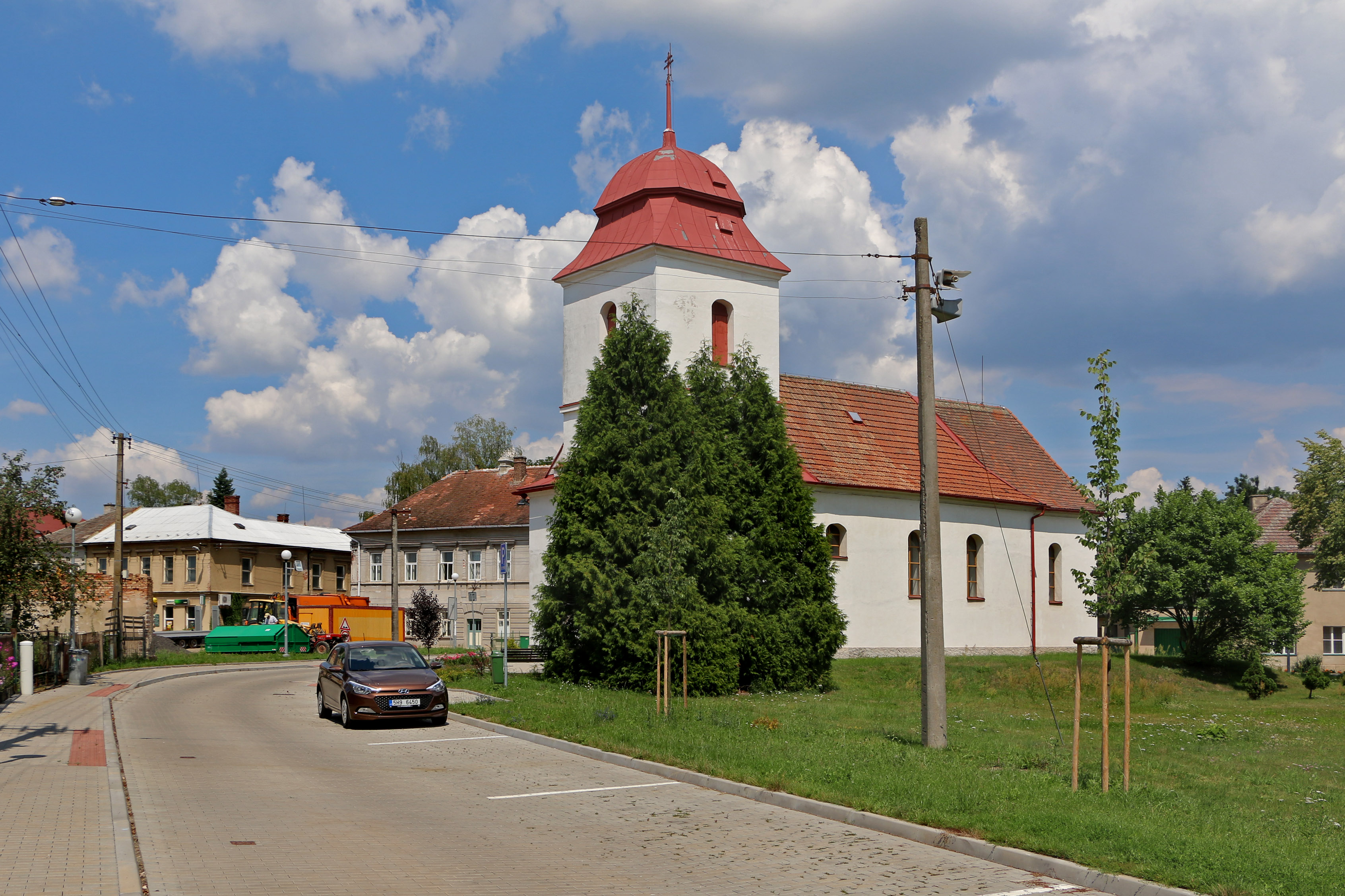
Church of Saint John the Baptist

There are no protected cultural monuments in the municipality. The main landmark of Albrechtice nad Orlicí is the Church of Saint John the Baptist.

== Notable people ==
- Josef Peukert (1855–1910), anarchist

== Twin towns – sister cities ==
Albrechtice nad Orlicí is twinned with:

- Wörgl, Austria
