= Pittsburgh Manifesto =

1881 anarchist manifesto

"To the Workingmen of America", known as the "Pittsburgh Manifesto" or "Pittsburgh Proclamation", is an anarchist manifesto issued at the October 1883 Pittsburgh Congress of the International Working People's Association. After the organization faded, the manifesto remained generally accepted by American anarchists as a clear articulation of their beliefs.

== Bibliography ==
- Avrich, Paul (1984). The Haymarket Tragedy. Princeton University Press. ISBN 978-0-691-04711-9.
- Commons, John Rogers (1918). History of Labour in the United States. Vol. 2. New York: Macmillan.
- Gay, Kathlyn; Gay, Martin (1999). "Pittsburgh Manifesto". Encyclopedia of Political Anarchy. ABC-CLIO. pp. 168–169. ISBN 978-0-87436-982-3.
- Graham, Marcus, ed. (1974). 'Man!': An Anthology of Anarchist Ideas, Essays, Poetry and Commentaries. London: Cienfuegos Press. ISBN 978-0-904564-01-3. OCLC 1747959.
- Salerno, Sal (1990). "Anarcho-syndicalism". In Buhle, Mari Jo; Buhle, Paul; Georgakas, Dan (eds.). Encyclopedia of the American Left. Garland Reference Library of Social Science (1st ed.). New York: Garland. pp. 38–40. ISBN 978-0-8240-3713-0. OCLC 20997216.
