= Josef Peukert =

Austrian anarchist (1855–1910)

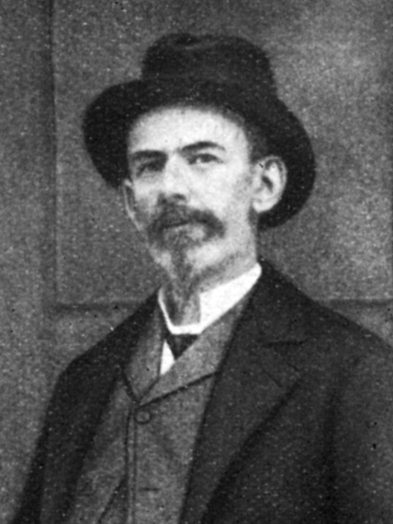
- Peukert ca. 1890
- Born: 22 January 1855; Albrechtsdorf an der Adler, Bohemia, Austrian Empire
- Died: 3 March 1910 (aged 55); Chicago, Illinois, United States
- Occupation: Journalist
- Known for: Anarchist activism

Josef Peukert (22 January 1855 – 3 March 1910) was an anarchist known for his autobiographical book Memoirs from the proletarian revolutionary labour movement (German: Erinnerungen eines Proletariers aus der revolutionären Arbeiterbewegung). The book provided a glimpse into the early days of the radical labour movement in Austria, the start of the anarchist movement in Germany and the exile of the anarchists in London and America at the time of Socialist Law (1878–1890). The accuracy of the book was questioned by fellow anarchist and historian Max Nettlau, who looked upon it in a "highly-skeptical" manner. He was an ethnic Jew from Bohemia.

== Early life ==
Peukert grew up poor at Albrechtsdorf an der Adler in the Kingdom of Bohemia, a crown land of the Austrian Empire. From the age of six, he worked for his father's company and the age of eleven he was taken out of school. At the age of 16 he left home and worked odd jobs in Germany. Peukert contributed to social democratic workers' associations later becoming an Anarchist communist.

== Career ==
In exile in London, Peukert became involved in distributing Freiheit published by Johann Most, but became increasingly critical of Most as Social-Revolutionist as opposed to an anarchist. During this time he became even more radicalized and upon his return in the 1880s he became the leader of the radical Fraktion, who were believers in the concept of Propaganda of the deed, which calls for the use of terror against society civil rights.

In the early 1880s, Peukert became the editor of Die Zukunft (English: The Future), published by Der Rebell (English: The Rebel), from 1886 to 1893 he was the editor of Die Autonomie (English: The Autonomy) and co-editor after 1889 of Der Anarchist (English: The Anarchist).

A so-called civil war within the Socialist League began because of Peukert's friendship with Theodor Reuss. Victor Dave, head of a rival anarchist grouping in London, did not trust Reuss which led to tension with Peukert. In 1887, Peukert went with Reuss to Belgium, where Reuss passed information to the police leading to the arrest of Johann Neve. In February 1887, Reuss used the unwitting Peukert to track down Johann Neve in Belgium, who was then arrested by the German police. Neve was a major organiser responsible for smuggling copies of Freiheit and other anarchist propaganda into Germany, making his arrest a significant coup for the Prussian Secret Police. He was sentenced to 15 years in prison, where he died. Although Peukert did not know he was being manipulated by Reuss, the episode left him permanently associated with the betrayal in the eyes of much of the movement. The dispute led to the expulsion of Peukert's Gruppe Autonomie from the anarchist club in Whitfield Street, Fitzrovia, forcing them to establish a rival club on Charlotte Street.. Neve was arrested and sentenced to 15 years in prison. The episode severely damaged the reputation of Peukert, and also Dave. This incident is touched upon in John Henry Mackay's Die Anarchisten.

From 1890 he worked with Emma Goldman for several years in New York City.

== Works ==
- Peukert, Josef (1913). Erinnerungen eines Proletariers aus der revolutionären Arbeiterbewegung. Verlag Ed. AV.
- Archive of Josef Peukert Papers at the International Institute of Social History
