= Victor Dave =

Belgian anarchist (1845–1922)

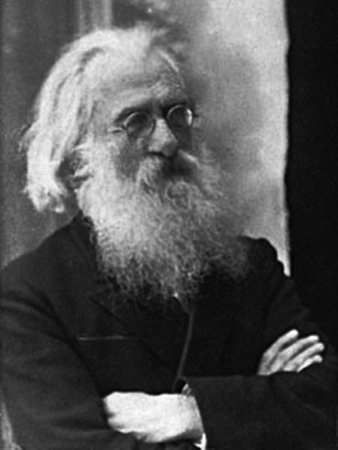
- Dave, c. 1910
- Born: February 25, 1847; Aalst, Belgium
- Died: October 31, 1922 (aged 75); Paris, France
- Occupations: Editor, journalist

Victor Dave (25 February 1847 – 31 October 1922) was a Belgian editor and journalist best known for his work on anarchist publications and in the International Workingmen's Association.

== Early life and career ==
Victor Dave was born in Aalst, Belgium, on 25 February 1847, to a customs officer. He showed interest in freethinking and socialism in his youth and attended the University of Liège and Université libre de Bruxelles. The Marxist socialist Paul Lafargue introduced Dave to the anarchist political thought of Proudhon at an 1869 international student congress in Liège. Within two years, Dave joined the Brussels branch of the International Workingmen's Association and two years later, its general council. He represented the international wing at the 1872 Hague Congress and the mechanics of Verviers at the 1873 Geneva Congress. At the former, Dave read the minority report supporting federative autonomy and voted against anarchist Bakunin's expulsion from the union. He worked on multiple French- and Dutch-language newspapers in the worker's association. He did not participate in the 1873 Spanish Cantonal rebellion despite rumours otherwise.

After marrying Marie Archambault of Loches, the couple moved to Paris in 1878, where Dave met Johann Most. Together, they moved to Most's London two years later, following their expulsion from France, and worked on the German anarchist newspaper Freiheit. Dave was arrested for treason in Augsburg in late 1880 and received a five-year sentence at trial. Upon his release in 1884, he returned to London, and three years later, Paris, as the French ban lifted. He worked in journalism and translation, editing for Éditions Schleicher and Augustin Hamon's l'Humanité nouvelle. He wrote a biography of Fernand Pelloutier and co-published the Revue générale de bibliographie française. He joined the proofreaders and copywriters union in 1911. Prominent anarchist Emma Goldman wrote of Dave being the most impressive man she met in fin de siècle Paris. By 1914, Dave became a follower of Kropotkin and in 1916, a signer of the Manifesto of the Sixteen for Allied intervention in the World War. He died on 31 October 1922, in Paris.

Media offices
Preceded by Frank Kitz	Editor of Freiheit; 1881–1882	Succeeded by Johann Most
