= International Anarchist School =

Historical anarchist educational institution in London

- Fitzroy Street; London; England

Information
- Other name: International School
- Mottoes: From each according to his capacity, to each according to his needs: Liberté, Égalité, Fraternité; La solidarité humain
- Established: 1891
- Founder: Louise Michel
- Closed: 1892
- School board: Peter Kropotkin; Errico Malatesta; William Morris
- Staff: Victorine Brocher; Nannie Dryhurst; Agnes Henry; Margaret McMillan; Rachel McMillan

The International Anarchist School was an educational institution founded by the French anarchist Louise Michel in London in 1891, in order to educate the children of political refugees.

== History ==
=== Background ===
Michel was a professional teacher who had previously educated the children of factory workers in Paris. Finding herself exiled in England in the 1890s she wanted to establish a school on anarchist principles, eschewing religion and instead guided by scientific reason, freethought and respect for individual liberties.

=== Establishment ===
Michel founded the International School in the autumn of 1891, initially using the premises of the Autonomie Club. Due to her lack of fluency in English, Michel agreed that Auguste Coulon, a polyglot she had met at the Autonomie Club, could be the school's secretary and language teacher. The project received the keen support of Peter Kropotkin, who did a fundraising lecture for it at the Athenaeum Hall, Errico Malatesta and William Morris. The newly established school soon moved to a more permanent address in, what is today, Fitzrovia.

Michel's school was a transnational endeavour set up by activists from many different countries, and open to the children of political refugees who were drawn from across the European continent. The teaching itself was largely free to access, being based on Bakuninist principles of education, as well as drawing a significant influence from the work of the anarchist pedagogue Paul Robin. Lessons at the school included various languages, crafts, arts, and music.

The International School's prospectus was designed by the artist Walter Crane, who utilised Louis Blanc's phrase "From each according to his capacity, to each according to his needs" as the school's motto. Those who taught at the school included Victorine Brocher, Agnes Henry, Rachel McMillan and her younger sister Margaret McMillan, and Nannie Dryhurst.

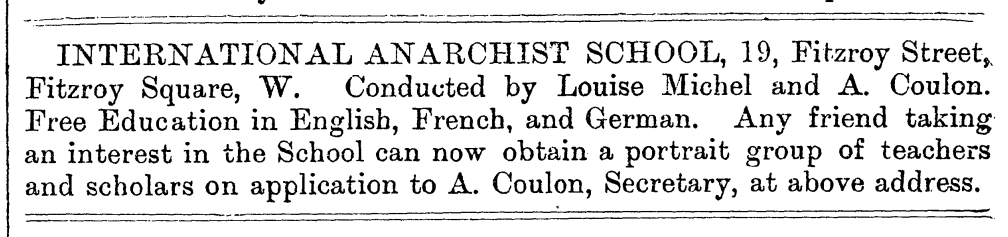
Advertisement for the school featured in The Commonweal, 1891

=== Closure ===
Unbeknownst to Michel and her colleagues, Coulon was in fact an agent provocateur in the pay of Special Branch. As secretary to the International Anarchist School Coulon was able to come into close proximity to those involved with the institution, giving him access to their personal details, and even providing a pretence to photograph them. Over the course of 1891 staff at the school had become increasingly concerned about Coulon's behaviour and suspicious of the content of his lessons, until he was finally asked to leave. In 1892 a police raid on the premises of the school uncovered explosives and bombs in the cellar of the building, which had almost certainly been planted there by Coulon, who is known to have instigated the entrapment of the Walsall anarchists during the same period.

Following his dismissal from the International School, Coulon published a pamphlet in which he made false denunciations against his successors, David Nicoll and Cyril Bell, accusing them of defrauding funds from the movement and working for the police. In 1894 Coulon would attempt to re-establish the International School under the name Ecole Anarchiste Industrielle. However, the venture failed to ever materialise.

== Location ==
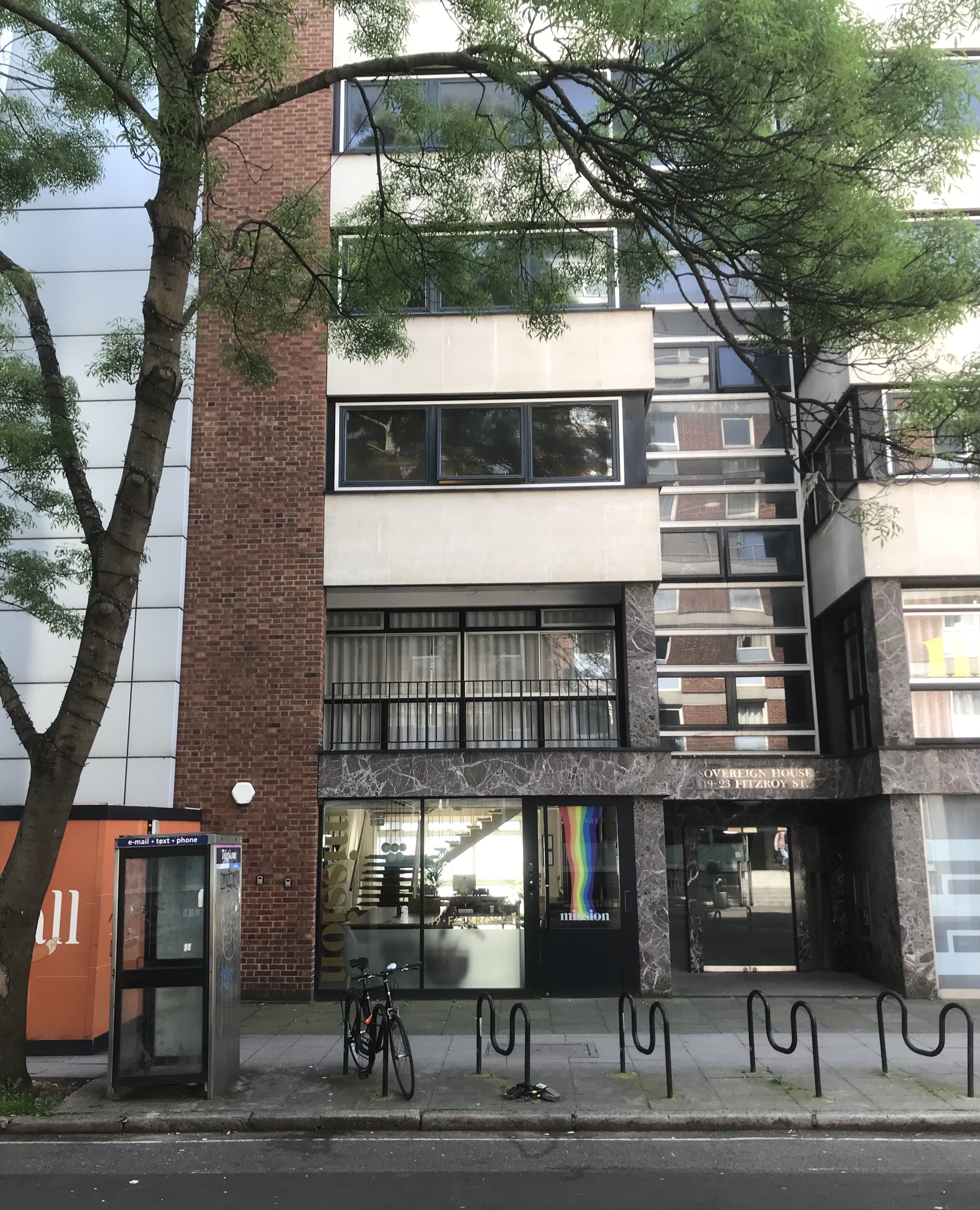
The former site of the International Anarchist School at 19 Fitzroy Street

Although Fitzroy Square is often erroneously cited as the location of the school, its first site was on Windmill Street, before it was permanently housed at number 19 Fitzroy Street.

== Analysis ==
The International Anarchist School was part of a wider anarchist pedagogical movement which developed from the late-19th century. In part this tendency was a rejection of propaganda of the deed, as well as a reaction to the establishment of formal state run education systems. The school was just one episode in Michel's broader activism on behalf of the anarchist exiles, and has been seen as a progenitor of later feminist practices within anarchism.

== See also ==
- Collège Louise-Michel in Paris
