= Louise Michel =

French anarchist (1830–1905)

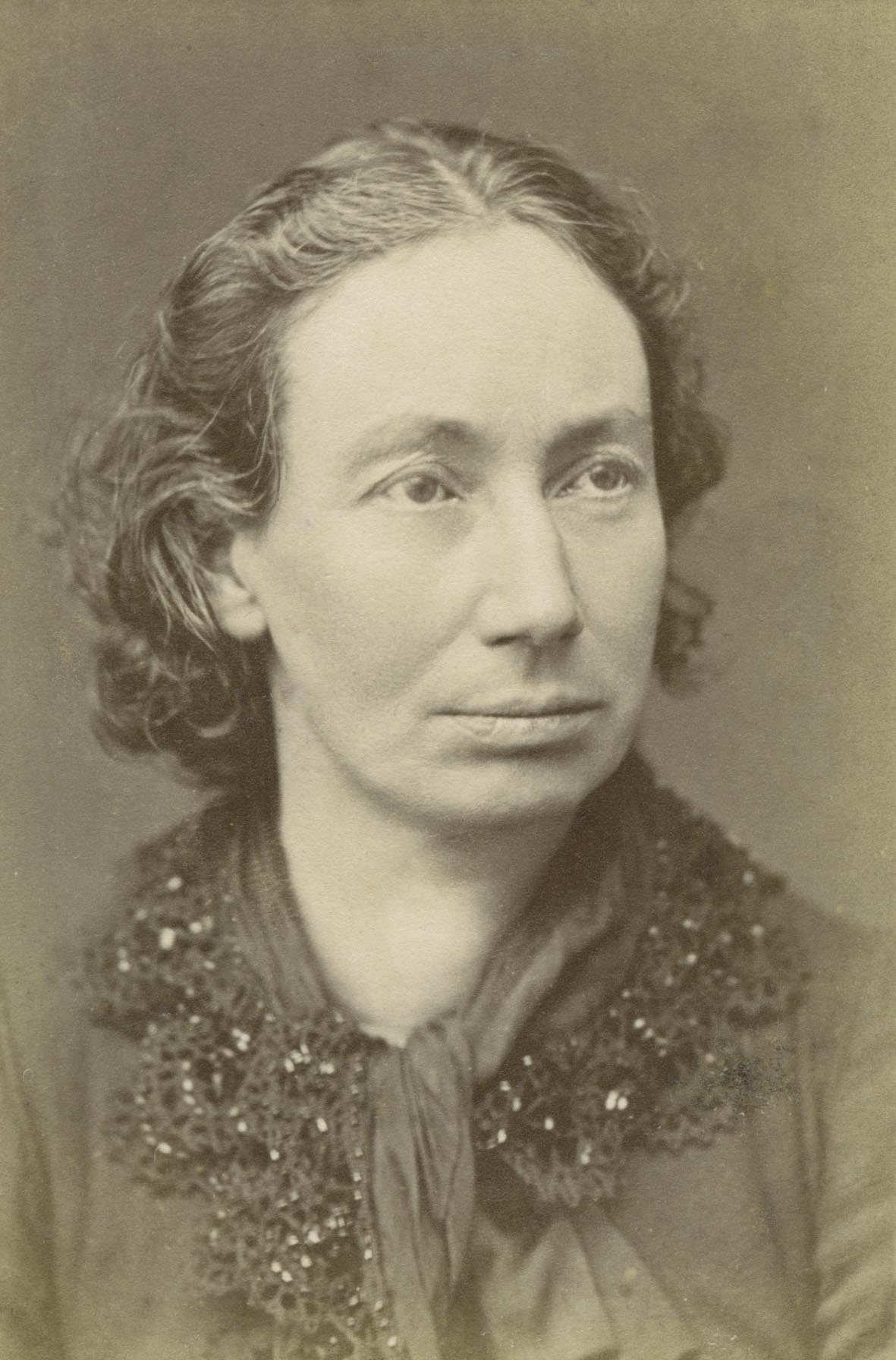
- Louise Michel (c. 1880)
- Born: 29 May 1830; Vroncourt-la-Côte, France
- Died: 9 January 1905 (aged 74); Marseille, France
- Other name: Enjolras
- Occupations: Revolutionary, teacher, medic
- Known for: Activities in the Paris Commune; Anarchist militancy Feminist militancy
- Movement: Anarchism

Louise Michel (French: [lwiz miʃɛl]; 29 May 1830 – 9 January 1905), also known by her nickname of Enjolras, was a French teacher, writer, poet, philosopher, Communard, and anarchist. A major figure in the Paris Commune, where she was militarily and politically involved and was one of the most famous representatives of the role played by women in the Paris Commune, she was also a feminist figure and became one of the key personalities of anarchism during her lifetime, a movement she joined after the Commune and profoundly influenced.

Concerned with education from an early age, she taught for several years before moving to Paris in 1856. At the age of 26, she developed significant literary, educational, and political activity there and connected with several Blanquist revolutionary figures in Paris during the 1860s.

In 1871, she actively participated in the events of the Paris Commune, both on the front line and in support. Having turned herself in in May to secure her mother's release, she was deported to New Caledonia, where she converted to anarchist thought. She returned to mainland France in 1880, thanks to the amnesty for the Communards, and, being very popular, participated in numerous demonstrations and meetings in favor of the working class. She remained under police surveillance and was imprisoned several times but continued her political activism throughout France until her death at the age of 74 in Marseille.

She remains a prominent revolutionary and anarchist figure in the collective imagination. The first anarchist to display the black flag during the demonstration of 9 March 1883, she popularized it within the anarchist movement. She was also a precursor on the issue of animal welfare, denouncing animal cruelty and exploitation, in particular, alongside that of human beings.

== Early life ==
Louise Michel was born May 29, 1830 to Marianne Michel, a domestic worker, and Laurent Demahis. She was raised by her paternal grandparents, Charlotte and Charles-Étienne Demahis, in northeastern France. Louise spent her childhood in the Château de Vroncourt and was provided with a liberal education. When her grandparents died, she completed teacher training and worked in villages.

== Career and activism ==
In 1865 Michel opened a school in Paris which became known for its modern and progressive methods. She corresponded with Victor Hugo and began publishing poetry. She became involved in the radical politics of Paris, and Auguste Blanqui, Jules Vallès and Théophile Ferré were among her associates. In 1869 the feminist group Société pour la Revendication des Droits Civils de la Femme (Society for the Demand of Civil Rights for Women) was announced by André Léo. Among the members of the group were Michel, Paule Minck, Eliska Vincent, Élie Reclus and his wife Noémi Reclus, Mme Jules Simon, Caroline de Barrau and Maria Deraismes. Because of the broad range of opinions, the group decided to focus on the subject of improving girls' education.

Commonly known as the Revendication des Droits de la Femme (Demand for Women's Rights), the group had close ties with the Société Coopérative des Ouvriers et Ouvrières (Cooperative Society of Men and Women Workers). The July 1869 manifesto of the Revendication des Droits de la Femme was thus signed by the wives of militant cooperative members. The manifesto was also supported by Sophie Doctrinal, signing with Citoyenne Poirier (Citizen Poirier), who would later become a close associate of Michel in the Paris Commune. In January 1870 Michel and Léo attended the funeral of Victor Noir, the journalist shot and killed by Prince Pierre Bonaparte, a cousin of the Emperor Napoleon III. Michel expressed disappointment that the death of Noir had not been used to overthrow the Empire. At the start of the Siege of Paris, in November 1870, Léo in a lecture declared "It is not a question of our practicing politics, we are human, that is all."

=== Paris Commune ===
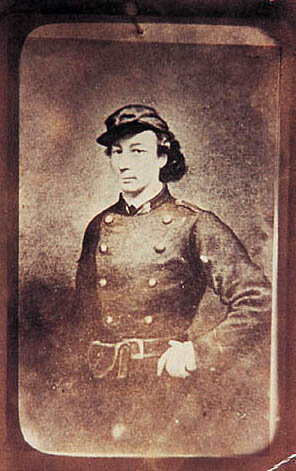
Michel in uniform

During the siege, Michel became part of the National Guard. When the Paris Commune was declared she was elected head of the Montmartre Women's Vigilance Committee. In April 1871 she threw herself into the armed struggle against the French government. Her close ally, Théophile Ferré, was a senior member of the Commune and of its Committee of Public Safety. It was Ferré who ordered the execution of Georges Darboy, the Archbishop of Paris. Michel was aligned with Ferré and Raoul Rigault, two of the most militant members of the Paris Commune. However, Ferré and Rigault persuaded her to not carry out her plan to assassinate Adolphe Thiers, the chief executive of the French national government. Michel fought with the 61st Battalion of Montmartre and organized ambulance stations during the beginning of the Bloody Week (May 21–28, 1871), the battle that ended the Commune In her memoirs she later wrote "oh, I'm a savage all right, I like the smell of gunpowder, grapeshot flying through the air, but above all, I'm devoted to the Revolution." On May 23, after a fierce fight, Montmartre was captured by the French Army. On May 24, she surrendered to the French army in order to save her mother from possible imprisonment.

Michel ideologically justified a militant revolution, proclaiming: "I descended the Butte, my rifle under my coat, shouting: Treason! . . . Our deaths would free Paris". She reflected: "It is true, perhaps, that women like rebellions. We are no better than men with respect to power, but power has not yet corrupted us." In her memoirs Michel confessed that the realities of the revolutionary government strengthened her resolve to end discrimination against women. On the attitude of her male comrades, she wrote, "How many times, during the Commune, did I go, with a national guardsman or a soldier, to some place where they hardly expected to have to contend with a woman?" She challenged her comrades to "play a part in the struggle for women's rights, after men and women have won the rights of all humanity?"

In December 1871, Michel was tried by a military court along with soldiers captured during the Bloody Week. She was charged with offenses including trying to overthrow the government, encouraging citizens to arm themselves, and using weapons and wearing a military uniform. She dared the judges to sentence her to death, saying "It seems that every heart that beats for freedom has no other right than a bit of lead, so I claim mine!" Instead, Michel was among 1,169 Commune supporters sentenced to penal transportation to a French prison colony in the South Pacific.

It is estimated by some sources that 20,000 defenders of the Paris Commune had been killed or summarily executed after combat, though this number is disputed by other more recent sources. Jacques Rougerie, a noted French Marxist historian, in 2014, put the probable number at closer to 10,000.

=== Deportation ===
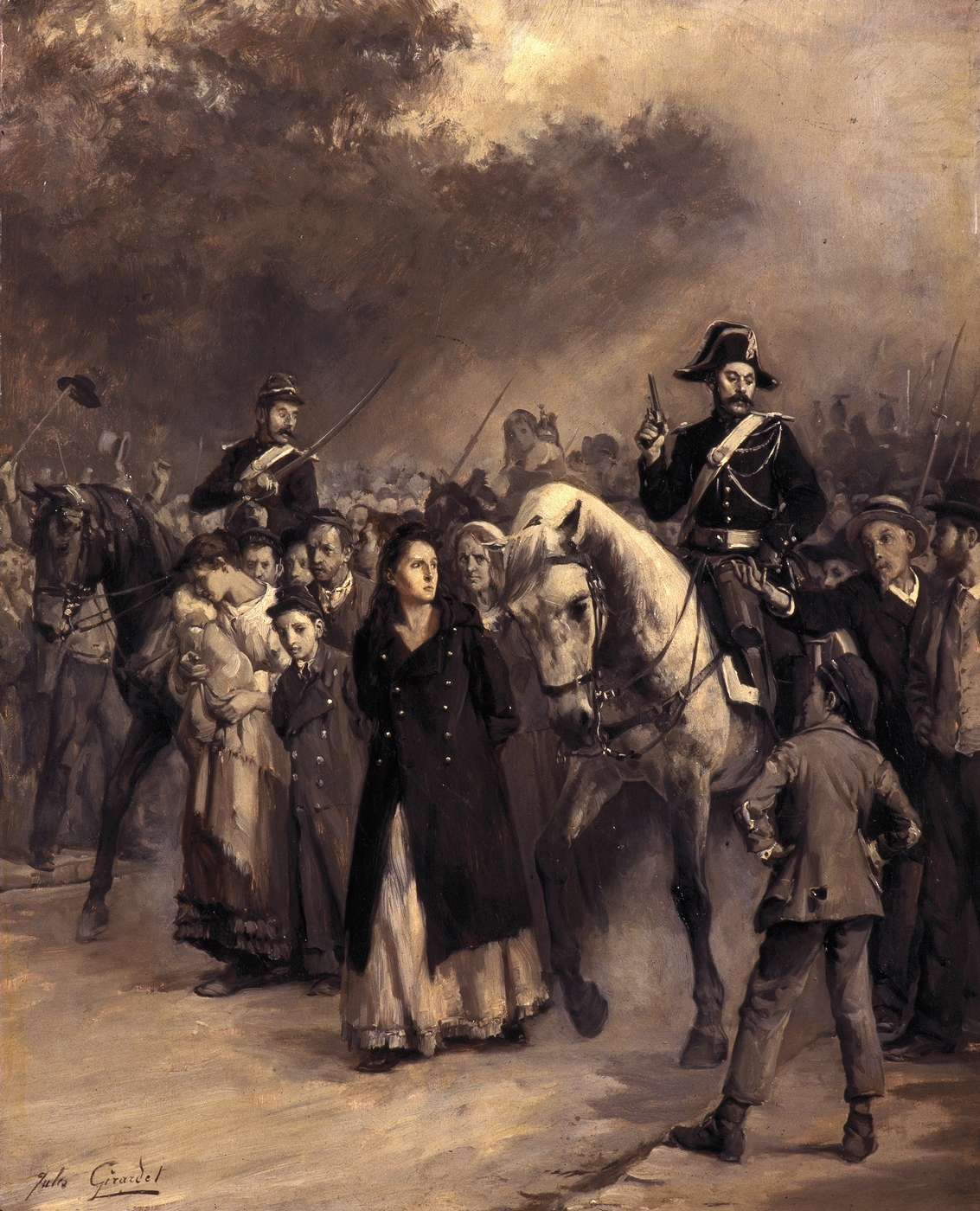
The arrest of Louise Michel in May 1871

On August 8, 1873, following twenty months in prison, Michel was loaded onto the ship Virginie, to be deported to New Caledonia, where four months later she arrived. While on board she became acquainted with Henri Rochefort, a famous polemicist, who became her lifelong friend. She also met Nathalie Lemel, another figure active in the commune. It was this latter contact that led Louise to become an anarchist. She remained in New Caledonia for seven years and during that period befriended the local Kanak people.

Taking an interest in Kanak legends, cosmology and languages, particularly the bichelamar creole, she learned about Kanak culture from friendships she had made with Kanak people. She taught French to Kanaks and took their side in the 1878 Kanak revolt. The following year, she received authorization to become a teacher in Nouméa for the children of the deported—among them many Algerian Kabyles ("Kabyles du Pacifique") from Cheikh Mokrani's rebellion (1871).

=== Return to France ===
In 1880, amnesty was granted to those who had participated in the Paris Commune. Michel returned to Paris, her revolutionary passion undiminished. She gave a public address on 21 November 1880 and continued her revolutionary activity in Europe, attending the 1881 London Social Revolutionary Congress, where she led demonstrations and spoke to huge crowds. While in London, she also attended meetings at the Russell Square home of the Pankhursts where she made a particular impression on a young Sylvia Pankhurst. In France she successfully campaigned, together with Charles Malato and Victor Henri Rochefort, for an amnesty to be extended to Algerian deportees in New Caledonia.

In March 1883 Michel published in La Vengeance Anarchiste, a journal calling for propaganda by the deed. Three days later, she led a demonstration of unemployed workers with her friend, Émile Pouget. In the subsequent riot, 500 demonstrators led by Michel pillaged three bakeries and shouted "Bread, work, or lead." Reputedly, Michel led this demonstration with a black flag, which has since become a symbol of anarchism. It was the first recorded use of the anarchist black flag.

Michel was tried for her actions in the riot and used the court to publicly defend her anarchist principles. She was sentenced to six years of solitary confinement for inciting the looting. Michel was defiant. For her, the future of the human race was at stake, "one without exploiters and without exploited." Michel was released in 1886, at the same time as Kropotkin and other prominent anarchists.

After her release, she published in the anarchist newspaper La Révolution cosmopolite with Charles Malato and Jacques Prolo. She contributed to its first issue and many subsequent publications. Through these contributions, she began to explore the use of literature as a revolutionary weapon, frequently publishing her poems in the journal. The paper was banned in 1887 for "incitement to murder and pillage".

=== Exile and speaking tours ===
In 1890 Michel was arrested again. After an attempt to commit her to a mental asylum, she moved to London where she lived for five years. She opened a school and moved among the European anarchist exile circles. Her International Anarchist School for the children of political refugees opened in 1890 at 19 Fitzroy Square. The teachings were influenced by the libertarian educationist Paul Robin and put into practice Mikhail Bakunin's educational principles, emphasising scientific and rational methods. Michel's aim was to develop among the children the principles of humanity and justice. Among the teachers were exiled anarchists, such as Victorine Rouchy-Brocher, but also pioneering educationalists such as Rachel McMillan and Agnes Henry. In 1892 the school was closed, when explosives were found in the basement. (See Walsall Anarchists.) It was later revealed that the explosives had been put there by Auguste Coulon, a Special Branch agent provocateur, who worked at the school as an assistant.

Michel contributed to many English-speaking publications. Some of her writings were translated into English by the poet Louisa Sarah Bevington. Michel's published works were also translated into Spanish by the anarchist Soledad Gustavo. The Spanish anarchist and workers rights activist Teresa Claramunt became known as the "Spanish Louise Michel". By this time Michel had become a well-known speaker, touring Europe repeatedly to speak in front of thousands of people.

In 1895 Sébastien Faure and Michel founded the French anarchist periodical Le Libertaire (The Libertarian), now called Le Monde Libertaire (Libertarian World). In the same year Michel met Emma Goldman at an anarchist conference in London, at which both were speaking. The young Goldman was hugely impressed by Michel, considering her to have a "social instinct developed to the extreme". In reference to the harsh conditions of Michel's life, Goldman asserted "Anarchists insist that conditions must be radically wrong if human instincts develop to such extremes at the expense of each other."

Michel returned to France in 1895. In an article published the next year, entitled "Why I am an Anarchist", Michel argued that "Anarchy will not begin the eternal miseries anew. Humanity in its fight of despair will cling to it in order to emerge from the abyss." In 1904 Michel went on a conference tour through French Algeria. Michel was scheduled to meet the anti-colonial campaigner Isabelle Eberhardt, but Eberhardt died shortly before Michel arrived in Algeria.

=== Death ===
Michel died of pneumonia in Marseille on 10 January 1905. Her funeral in Paris was attended by more than 100,000 people. Michel's grave is in the cemetery of Levallois-Perret, in a Paris suburb, the grave is maintained by the community. This cemetery is also the last resting place of her friend and fellow communard Théophile Ferré.

== Political theory ==
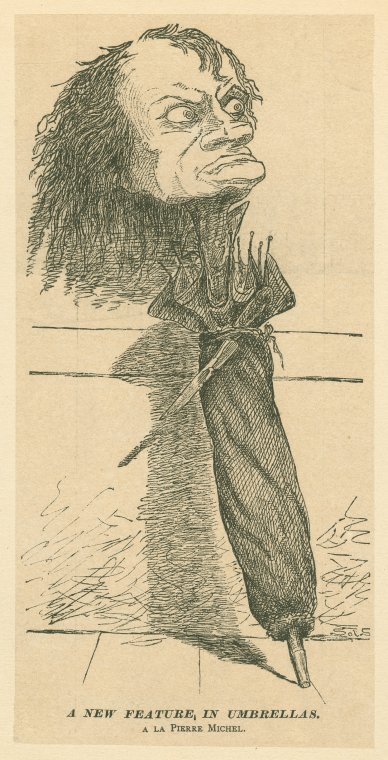
"A new feature, in umbrellas", satirizing Michel's political views

Michel once joked, "We love to have agents provocateurs in the party, because they always propose the most revolutionary motions." Michel's political ideas evolved throughout her life. Once a teacher with progressive ideals, her activism saw her embrace revolutionary socialism, but the experience of a suppressed revolution turned her into a radical anarchist. Her political theory progressed from peaceful reform to violent revolution, because she came to believe that contemporary society had to be completely destroyed for a new egalitarian era to emerge. The many years she spent in prison and in the French penal colony New Caledonia were central to her change of heart.

Michel's political theory had its roots in the aftermath of the French Revolution, which was followed by a series of monarchies. Two prevailing theories emerged. There were those who believed that the Reign of Terror that followed the revolution was proof that democracy was flawed. The ruling elites of the post-revolutionary monarchies believed that for the economy to succeed, it was necessary to control the labour market, wages and working conditions. Thus few labour reforms were enacted. In contrast, French romantics reinterpreted the French Revolution as the tangible spirit of the French people. In the 1840s romanticism in France became politicised, because it became accepted that individual happiness could not be achieved in isolation. Romantics became preoccupied with social progress and reform. Writers embarked on a quest to realistically portray the lives of the working poor. Victor Hugo and Émile Zola emerged as key writers and political activists.

Shortly after Michel was born in 1830 a short-lived revolt resulted in a constitutional monarchy being established. Louis Philippe I encouraged commercial interests and the enrichment of the upper-middle class through colonization and penal transportation, but at the same time practiced laissez-faire policies when the socio-economic plight of the working class was concerned. Michel first made a name for herself by publicly defending the poor and working-class women. In the 1860s she was noted as political activist for vehemently opposing the policies of Emperor Napoleon III. Michel signed a number of her published political writings with "Enjolras," the name of the revolutionary in Hugo's Les Misérables.

In 1865 Michel provocatively wrote a new Marseillaise, the call to arms during the French Revolution. In her version, Michel called for a mass uprising of the people to defend the republic, arguing that martyrdom was preferable to defeat. This sentiment would be echoed in her subsequently published poetry, plays and novels. Unlike her contemporaries, however, Michel repeatedly lamented the violent treatment of children and the gory abuse of animals. Michel's political characters fought for justice, while the children and animals in her fictional works were too weak, sick and starved to resist or survive.

When Emperor Napoleon III and his army were captured by the Prussians in 1870, the French Third Republic was proclaimed in Paris. But the provisional government continued the war against the Prussians and a four-month siege of Paris resulted in bleak hardship. Parisians starved and froze to death. Some managed to save themselves by eating cats, dogs, and rats. The government surrendered, but Michel and other Parisians had taken up arms and organised themselves as a National Guard. When the Paris Commune was proclaimed Michel was named head of the Women's Vigilance Committee and played a key role in initiating economic and social reforms. Michel pushed through the separation of church and state, initiated educational reforms and codified rights for workers. (The reforms were, however, not carried out due to the short duration of the Commune.) When Michel was tried, she demanded to be killed by firing squad and proclaimed "If you let me live, I shall never stop crying for vengeance, and I shall avenge my brothers by denouncing the murderers". The military court refused to make her a martyr.

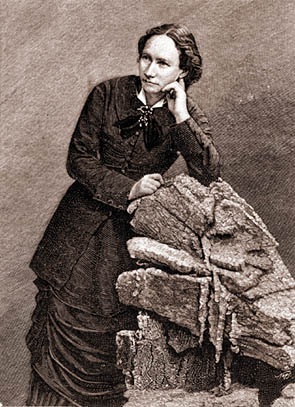
Louise-Michel in 1880, while in exile in New Caledonia

Michel was imprisoned for two years before she was deported. While in prison she demanded to be treated just like the other prisoners and rejected efforts by her friends Hugo and Georges Clemenceau to have her sentence commuted: She considered preferential treatment a dishonour. During the four-month journey to New Caledonia Michel re-examined her belief in revolutionary socialism. She embraced anarchism and for the rest of her life rejected all forms of government. She was introduced to the tenets of anarchism by a fellow prisoner Nathalie Lemel, with whom she was imprisoned in a large cage for several months. In 1896 Michel wrote about her political evolution:

"I considered the things, events and people of the past. I thought about the behaviour of our friends of the Commune: they were scrupulous, so afraid of exceeding their authority, that they never threw their full energies into anything but the loss of their own lives. I quickly came to the conclusion that good men in power are incompetent, just as bad men are evil, and therefore it is impossible for liberty ever to be associated with any form of power whatsoever."

Michel became known for her selfless generosity and devotion to others. In the penal colony she lived in voluntary poverty, giving away her books, clothes and any money she acquired. Michel took up teaching again. She spent time with the indigenous Kanak people, teaching them French so that they could challenge the French authorities. Michel supported them in their revolt against the colonial power.

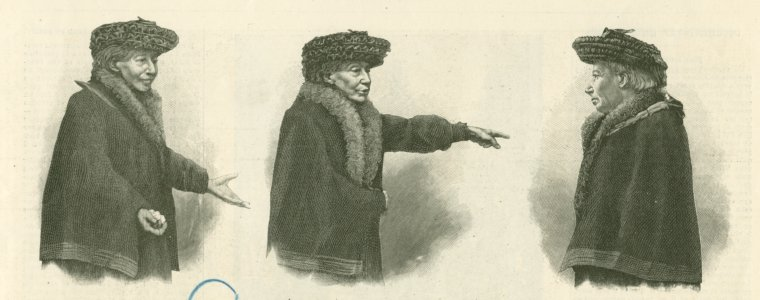
An elderly Michel depicted as an animated speaker

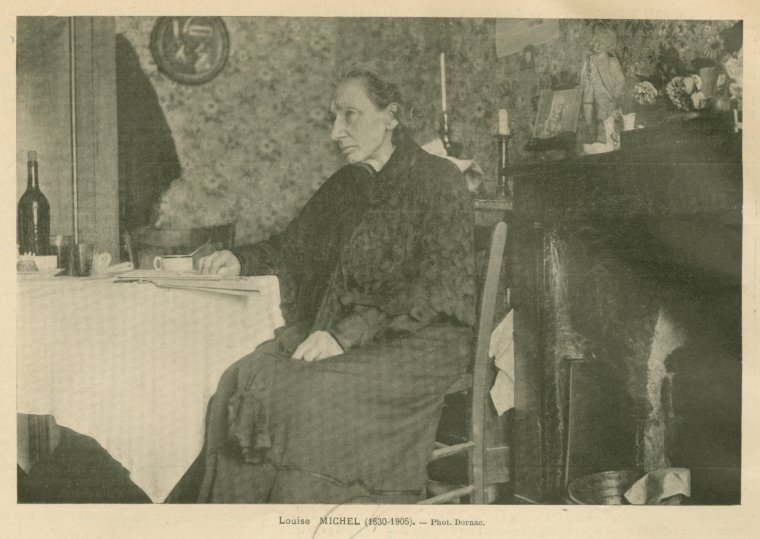
Louise Michel at home in France during her later years

In 1875 the monarchist-dominated National Assembly passed a constitution that established a republican government with an upper and lower house of parliament. This republic was a compromise, as the National Assembly could not agree on who should be king. The brutal crackdown on the Paris Commune would influence French politics for years to come. Conservatives and moderates in the new government avoided anything that could trigger another uprising. This fear delayed the amnesty for those who had participated in the Paris Commune for years. Eventually an amnesty was granted and when Michel returned to Paris in November 1880 she was greeted by Henri Rochefort, Clemenceau, a crowd of 20,000 and the police. But she had no patience for Clemenceau's "illustration... that he should wait for parliamentarianism to bring progress".

Michel soon began her career as a public speaker and found an audience all over Europe. In 1882 she staged her first anarchist play Nadine. As a public speaker Michel became skilled in advancing pragmatic arguments to attack capitalism and the authoritarian state, while holding open the possibility of a positive outcome. When she was put on trial in 1883 for leading a group of unemployed workers, she attacked shortcomings in the implementation of the French republican constitution, saying:

"They keep talking to us about liberty: There is the liberty of speech with five years of prison at the end. In England, the meeting would have taken place; in France, they have not even made a legal admonition in order to let the crowd retreat, which would have left without resistance. People are dying from hunger, and they do not even have the right to say that they are dying from hunger."

Michel frequently spoke on women's rights from an anarchist perspective. She not only advocated education for women, but also that marriage should be free and that men should hold no property rights over women. In the late 1880s Michel authored several works in which she revisited the themes of her earlier works, but also portrayed the demise of the old order and its replacement with a society of equals. Michel embarked on a journey towards a new political philosophy. The revolutionary characters in The Strike expected to die, but instead they gave life to a new age and Michel discussed the rights and responsibilities of the people who lived in the aftermath of a revolution.

Michel staged her plays in accordance with Jean Grave's theory on audience participation. The audience was encouraged to react and re-enact the conflicts of the plays and was integrated through a political and artistic program of lectures, poems, and songs. In her plays The Human Microbes (1886), Crimes of the Times (1888) and The Bordello (1890) an agricultural utopia emerges from a devastated Europe. Michel's political ideals owed much to the French romanticism of Hugo and are described at length in The New Era, Last Thought, Memories of Caledonia (1887):

"It is indeed time that this old world die since no one is safe any longer... We can no longer live like our Stone Age ancestors, nor as in the past century, since the series of inventions, since the discoveries of science have brought the certainty that all production will increase a hundredfold when these innovations will be used for the general good, instead of letting just a handful of vultures help themselves in order to starve the rest."

Michel lived at a time when hunger was widespread among the working poor of Europe. She believed that technological progress would replace physical labour with machines. In combination with anarchist politics, she argued, this could lead to equal distribution of wealth. In 1890 she reasoned that "the attractive power of progress will demonstrate itself all the more as daily bread will be assured, and a few hours of work which will have become attractive and voluntary will be enough to produce more than what is necessary for consumption." Like other anarchists of her time she did not believe that history was a record of constant improvement, but that it could become so. However, constant economic growth was not an improvement in itself. Michel argued instead, that progress came through intellectual development, social evolution, and liberation. Her vision of the future was shaped by a supreme confidence.

"Science will bring forth harvests in the desert; the energy of the tempests and whirlpools will carve paths through the mountains. Undersea boats will discover lost continents. Electricity will carry ships of the air above the icy poles. The ideas of Liberty, Equality and Justice will finally burst into flame. Each individual will live his integral part within humankind as a whole. Progress being infinite, transformations will be perpetual."

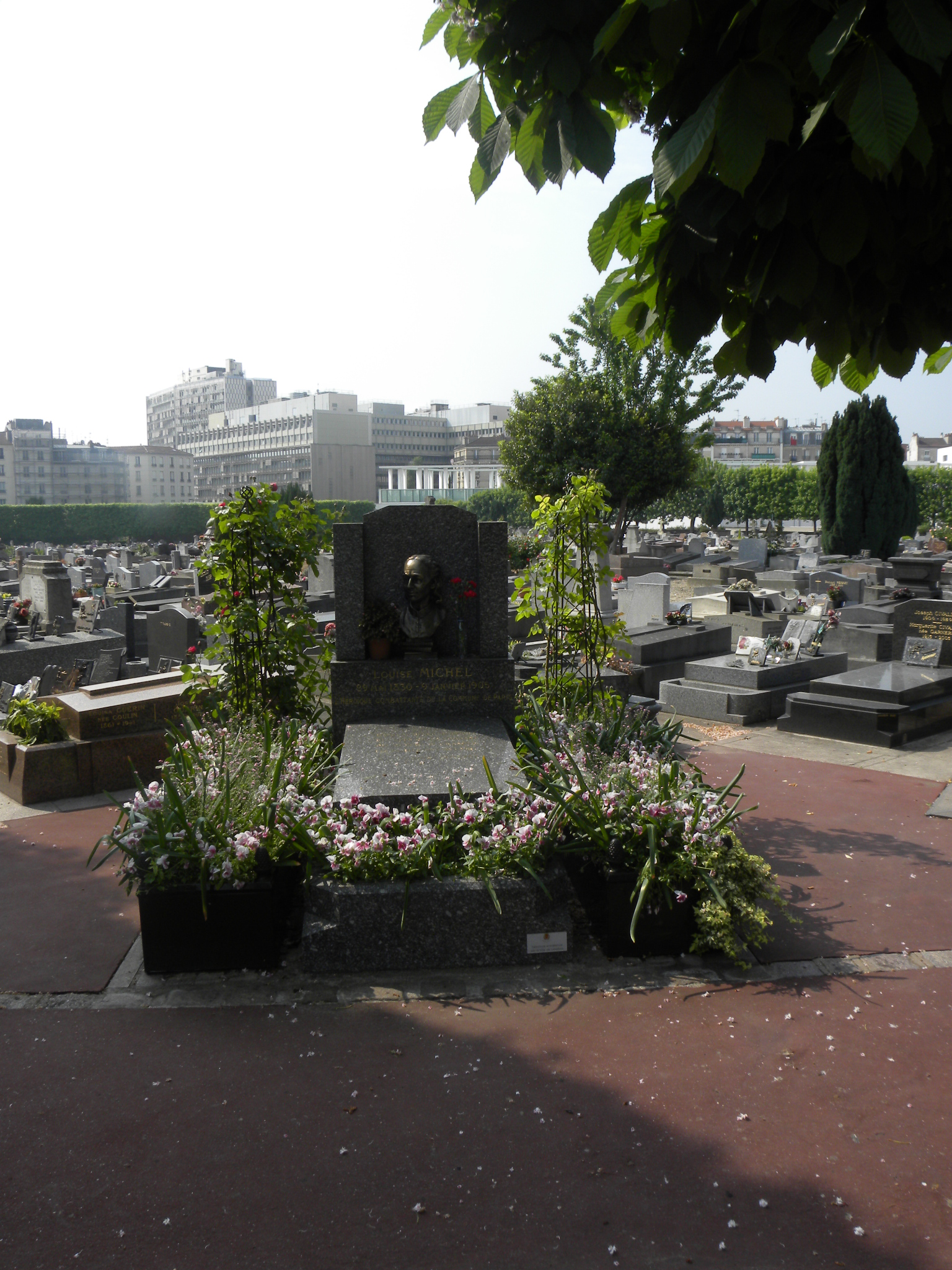
Michel's tomb at the Levallois-Perret cemetery

While bemoaning the poverty in which people across Europe lived, Michel also advanced a detailed critique of 19th century capitalism. She lamented the deficiencies of the capitalist banking system and predicted that the concentration of capital would result in the ruin of small enterprises and the middle class. In her memoirs Michel wrote that the Anarchist Manifesto of Lyon (1883) precisely expressed her views. The Manifesto had been signed by Peter Kropotkin, Émile Gautier, Joseph Bernard, Pierre Martin and Toussaint Bordat. Kropotkin, like Jules Guesde and Émile Pouget would become her close friends and associates. Instead of focusing on violent revolution, as she had done in her earlier works, Michel in her later works emphasised the spontaneous uprising of the people. She came to reject terror as a means of bringing about a new era. Michel wrote "Tyrannicide is practical only when tyranny has a single head, or at most a small number of heads. When it is a hydra, only the Revolution can kill it". She took the view that it is best if the leaders of such a revolution would perish, so that the people would not be burdened with surviving general staff. Michel thought that "power is evil" and in her mind history was the story of free people being enslaved. In an 1882 speech Michel said "All revolutions have been insufficient because they have been political." Organisation was, in her mind, not necessary because the poor and exploited would rise up and, through their sheer numbers, would force the old order to shrivel up.

== Legacy ==
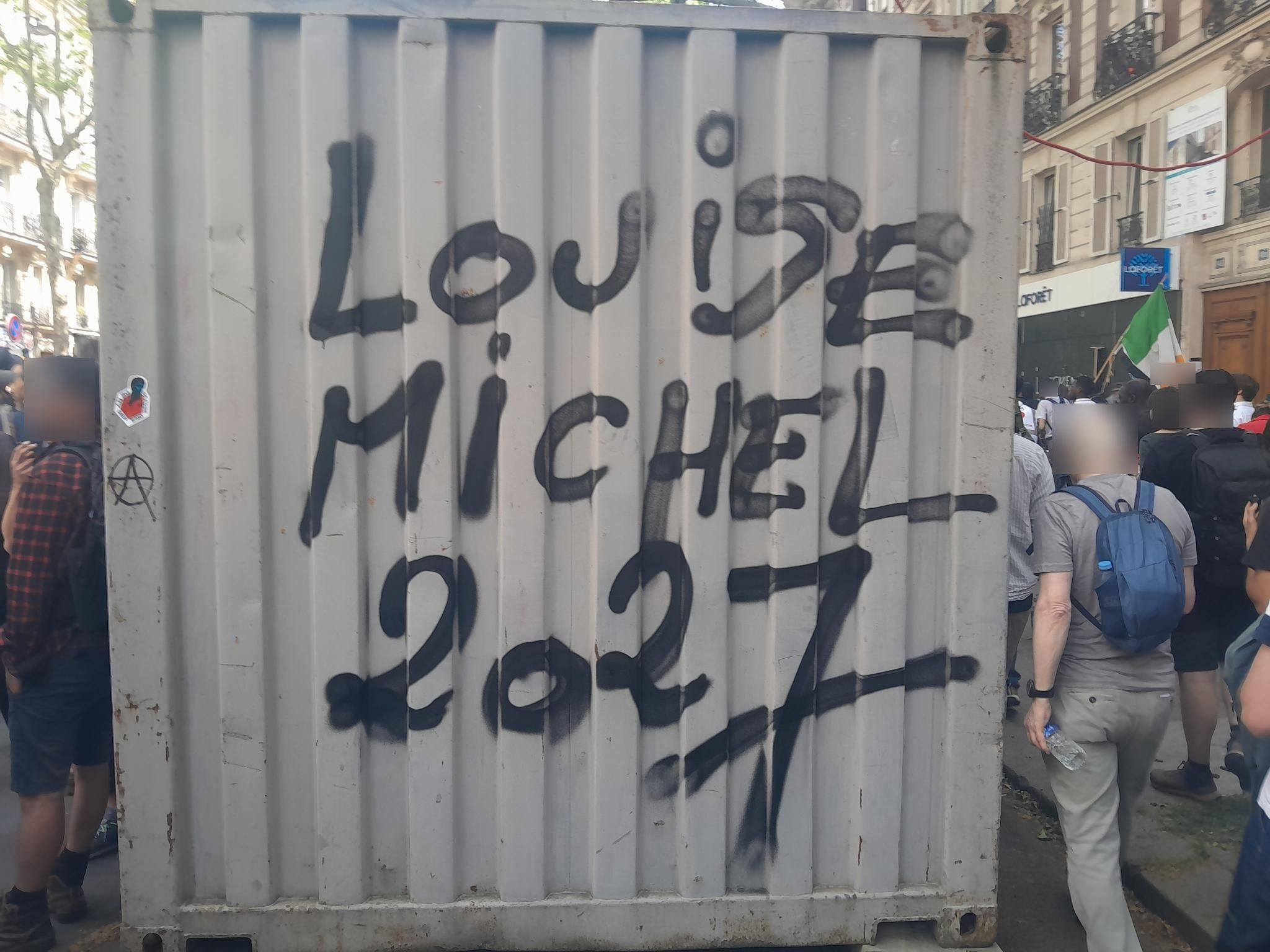
Anarchist graffiti during the demonstration of 1st May 2026 in Paris asking for Louise Michel for 2027, a reference to the 2027 French presidential election

Michel was among the more influential French political figures in the second half of the 19th century. She was also one of the more powerful women political theorists of her day. Her publications on social justice for the poor and the cause of the working classes were read in France and all over Europe. When she died in 1905 she was mourned by thousands, with memorial services were held all over France and in London. Although her writings are today are largely forgotten, Michel's name is remembered in the names of French streets, schools and parks. She became a national heroine in France and was revered as the "great citizen."

A cultish image of Michel also emerged. Shortly before her death, when returning from her exile in London, Michel had been dubbed "the angel of petrol," "the virago of the rabble," and "queen of the scum" by the conservative French press. In turn, Charles Ferdinand Gambon compared her to Jeanne d'Arc in reference to her role in the Paris Commune. This imagery was further propagandized by Edmond Lepelletier in 1911. The image of Michel as vierge rouge (red virgin) came to be used by conservative and liberal historians alike when recounting the story of the Paris Commune.

Michel is regarded as a founder of anarcha-feminism. Despite the anti-authoritarian rhetoric, early anarchist thinkers maintained cultural orthodoxy when it came to the division of domestic labour and their personal relationships with women. The founder of French anarchism, Pierre-Joseph Proudhon was notorious for his sexist views. Michel, Teresa Claramunt, Lucy Parsons, Voltairine de Cleyre, and Emma Goldman became prominent figures in the late 19th century pan-European and American anarchist movement. With the formation of the First International anarchist sections in various European countries under the leadership of Mikhail Bakunin, anarchism became noted for not only encouraging female participation in the political movement but also for espousing the ideal of female emancipation.

In 1913-1914, the anarchist cooperative Le Cinéma du Peuple chose Michel's first name to name the main character of its first film, Les Misères de l'aiguille. This is also likely the first feminist film in history.

A movie by the French filmmaker Sarah Maldoror, The Commune, Louise Michel and Us (1971), now lost, was commissioned by the city of Saint-Denis. Michel was rediscovered by French feminists in the 1970s through the works of Xavière Gauthier. Michel is the subject of Mary M Talbot and Bryan Talbot's graphic work, The Red Virgin and the Vision of Utopia (2016). In 2020, street artist Banksy was credited for sending a rescue ship in the Mediterranean Sea and naming it after Michel.

the International Institute of Social History in Amsterdam acquired an archive of her papers in 1936. Academic interest in Michel's life and political writings was prompted in the 1970s by Édith Thomas's comprehensively researched biography.

=== Monuments in Paris ===
In 1937 the Collège Louise-Michel was opened in the 10th arrondissement. On 1 May 1946 the Paris Metro Vallier station in Levallois-Perret Paris Metro was renamed Louise Michel station. In 2004 the Square Louise-Michel in Montmartre was renamed after her. Michel was one of ten French women honoured during the 2024 Summer Olympics opening ceremony in Paris, where a gold statue of her was raised along the Seine river.

== Publications ==
- Anarchie, poetry and political philosophy, La Vengeance Anarchiste, 6 March 1883
- À travers la vie, poetry, Paris, 1894.
- Le Bâtard impérial, by L. Michel and J. Winter, Paris, 1883.
- Le claque-dents, Paris.
- La Commune, Paris, 1898.
- ''Contes et légendes'', Paris, 1884. Translated into English by Jade Maître as 'Fairy Tales and Legends'
- Les Crimes de l'époque, nouvelles inédites, Paris, 1888.
- Défense de Louise Michel, Bordeaux, 1883.
- Grèves et révoltes ('Strikes and Revolts') in Le Droit social, Lyon, 1882. (in French)
- L'Ère nouvelle, pensée dernière, souvenirs de Calédonie (prisoners' songs), Paris, 1887
- La Fille du peuple par L. Michel et A. Grippa, Paris (1883)
- Le Gars Yvon, légende bretonne, Paris, 1882.
- Légendes et Chants des Gestes Canaques, Paris, 1885. Translated into English by Mitch Abidor as 'Legends and Chants des Gestes' 2005.
- Lectures encyclopédiques par cycles attractifs, Paris, 1888.
- Ligue internationale des femmes révolutionnaires, Appel à une réunion. Signed "Louise Michel", Paris, 1882.
- Le livre du jour de l'an : historiettes, contes et légendes pour les enfants, Paris, 1872.
- Lueurs dans l'ombre. Plus d'idiots, plus de fous. L'âme intelligente. L'idée libre. L'esprit lucide de la terre à Dieu... Paris, 1861.
- Manifeste et proclamation de Louise Michel aux citoyennes de Paris, Signed "Louise Maboul", Paris, 1883.
- Mémoires, Paris, 1886 (edited and translated by Bullitt Lowry and Elizabeth Ellington Gunter as The Red Virgin: Memoirs of Louise Michel, The University of Alabama Press University, 1981, ISBN 0-8173-0063-5)
- Les Méprises, grand roman de mœurs parisiennes, par Louise Michel et Jean Guêtré, Paris, 1882. Note that this is traditionally attributed to Louise Michel but in her memoirs she says that she did not contribute “a single line” to Les Méprisées, having maintained the collaboration only “to remain on good terms (with the co-author) rather than resorting to disputes.”
- Les Microbes humains, Paris, 1886. (translated by Brian Stableford as The Human Microbes, ISBN 978-1-61227-116-3)
- La Misère by Louise Michel, 2nd part, and Jean Guêtré 1st part, Paris, 1882.
- Le Monde nouveau, Paris, 1888 (translated by Brian Stableford as The New World, ISBN 978-1-61227-117-0)
- "Nous reviendrons foule sans nombre": Louise Michel à Victor Hugo, lettres de prison et du bagne (1871–1879), ed. by Virginie Berling, coll. Scènes intempestives à Grignan, ed. TriArtis, Paris 2016, ISBN 978-2-916724-78-2.
- Today or Tomorrow (Aujourd'hui ou demain), 10–17 July 1892

Posthumous

- Vol. I. Avant la Commune. Preface by Laurent Tailhade, Alfortville, 1905.
- Les Paysans by Louise Michel et Émile Gautier, Paris, Incomplete.
- Prise de possession, Saint-Denis, 1890.
- Le Rêve (in a work by Constant Martin), Paris, 1898.
- Je vous écris de ma nuit, correspondance générale, 1850-1904, edition established by Xavière Gauthier, Édition de Paris-Max Chaleil, 1999.

== See also ==
- Anarchism in France
- Louise Michel Battalions – Spanish Civil War
- Marie Ferré

== Bibliography ==
- Bantman, Constance (2013). The French Anarchists in London, 1880-1914: Exile and Transnationalism in the First Globalisation. Oxford University Press. pp. 89–91. ISBN 9781781386583.
- Bantman, Constance (2017). "Louise Michel's London years: A political reassessment (1890–1905)". Women's History Review. 26 (6): 994–1012. doi:10.1080/09612025.2017.1294393. S2CID 151640193.
- Beach, Cecilia (2005). "Staging the Revolution: Louise Michel". Staging Politics and Gender: French Women's Drama, 1880–1923. New York: Palgrave Macmillan. pp. 26–48. ISBN 978-1-349-52917-9. OCLC 951524695.
- Bufe, Chaz (2014). Provocations: Don't Call Them Libertarians, AA Lies, and Other Incitements. See Sharp Press. p. 45. ISBN 9781937276744.
- Butterworth, Alexander (2010). The World That Never Was: A True Story of Dreamers, Schemers, Anarchists and Secret Police. Pantheon Books.
- Chisholm, Hugh, ed. (1911). "Michel, Clémence Louise" . Encyclopædia Britannica. Vol. 18 (11th ed.). Cambridge University Press. p. 362.
- Danaswamy, Jayacintha (October 1998). "Louise Michel". Workers Solidarity (55).
- Doherty, Brian (January 2011). "The First War on Terror". Reason.
- Fauré, Christine (2003). Political and Historical Encyclopedia of Women. Routledge. p. 359. ISBN 9781135456917.
- Goldman, Emma (1996). Vision on Fire: Emma Goldman on the Spanish Revolution. AK Press. ISBN 9781904859574.
- Gopnik, Adam (22 December 2014). "The Fires of Paris". The New Yorker.
- Gullickson, Gay L. (1996). Unruly Women of Paris: Images of the Commune. Cornell University Press. pp. 149–154. ISBN 9780801483189.
- Ilie, Cornelia; Garzone, Giuliana, eds. (2017). Argumentation Across Communities of Practice: Multi-Disciplinary Perspectives. John Benjamins Publishing Company. pp. 105–121. ISBN 9789027265173.
- Kramarae, Cheris; Spender, Dale, eds. (2004). Routledge International Encyclopedia of Women: Global Women's Issues and Knowledge. Routledge. p. 47. ISBN 9781135963156.
- Maclellan, Nic, ed. (2004). Louise Michel. Ocean Press. ISBN 978-1-876175-76-4.
- Mason, Paul (2007). Live Working or Die Fighting: How the Working Class Went Global. Harvill Secker. ISBN 978-0-436-20615-3.
- McAuliffe, Mary (2011). Dawn of the Belle Epoque: The Paris of Monet, Zola, Bernhardt, Eiffel, Debussy, Clemenceau, and Their Friends. Rowman & Littlefield Publishers. pp. 143–147. ISBN 9781442209299.
- McCollum Feeley, Francis (2010). Comparative Patriarchy and American Institutions: The Language, Culture, and Politics of Liberalism. Cambridge Scholars Publishing. ISBN 9781443820141.
- Michel, Louise (1981). The Red Virgin: Memoirs of Louise Michel. University of Alabama Press. ISBN 978-0-8173-0062-3.
- Milza, Pierre (2009a). L'année terrible: La Commune (mars–juin 1871) [The terrible year: La Commune (March–June 1871)] (in French). Paris: Perrin. ISBN 978-2-262-03073-5.
- Phillips, Philip Edward, ed. (2014). Prison Narratives from Boethius to Zana. Springer. pp. 119–128. ISBN 9781137428684.
- Di Paola, Pietro (2013). The Knights Errant of Anarchy: London and the Italian Anarchist Diaspora (1880-1917). Oxford University Press. p. 22. ISBN 9781846319693.<
- Ramsay, Raylene L. (2003). French Women in Politics: Writing Power, Paternal Legitimization, and Maternal Legacies. Berghahn Books. p. 31. ISBN 9781571810816.
- de la Rochère, Martine Hennard Dutheil (2013). Reading, Translating, Rewriting: Angela Carter's Translational Poetics. Wayne State University Press. p. 303. ISBN 9780814336359.
- Ryley, Peter (2013). Making Another World Possible: Anarchism, Anti-capitalism and Ecology in Late 19th and Early 20th Century Britain. Bloomsbury Publishing USA. p. 3. ISBN 9781441153777.
- Shone, Steve J. (2019). "Louise Michel: Neither a Red Nor a Virgin?". Women of Liberty. Studies in Critical Social Sciences. Vol. 135. Brill Publishers. pp. 55–77. doi:10.1163/9789004393226_004. ISBN 978-90-04-39045-4.
- Spielvogel, Jackson J. (2013). Western Civilization: A Brief History. Vol. II: Since 1500. Cengage Learning. p. 530. ISBN 9781133607939.
- Tardif, Marie-Pier (2021), Ni ménagères, ni courtisanes. Les femmes de lettres dans la presse anarchiste française (1885-1905) (PhD thesis) [Neither housewives nor courtesans. Women writers in the French anarchist press (1885-1905)] (PDF)
- Thomas, Edith (1980). Louise Michel. Black Rose Books.
- Thomas, Edith (2007). The Women Incendiaries. Translated by Atkinson, James; Atkinson, Starr. Haymarket Books. ISBN 978-1-931859-46-2.
- Wehling, Jason (14 July 1995). "Anarchism and the History of the Black Flag". Spunk Library.
- Winslow, Barbara (2013). Sylvia Pankhurst: Sexual Politics and Political Activism. Routledge. ISBN 9781134220106.
