= Educational organization =

Educational organization may refer to:

- Educational institution
- School
- University
- Educational management
