= The Great French Revolution =

1909 history book by Peter Kropotkin

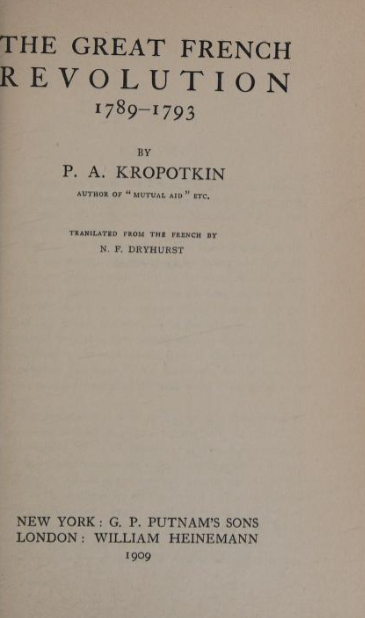
- Title page for The Great French Revolution, 1789–1793 (1909)
- Author: Peter Kropotkin
- Language: French
- Publication date: 1909
- English publication date: 1909

The Great French Revolution, 1789–1793 is a 1909 history of the French Revolution by Peter Kropotkin, published in both French and English. It was first translated from French to English by Nannie Dryhurst in 1909.

Kropotkin wrote a series of articles on the French Revolution for Le Révolté and an essay for The Nineteenth Century in 1889. These articles were expanded into The Great French Revolution, which was published in French and English in 1909.

== Bibliography ==
- Fling, Fred Morrow (1910). "Review of The Great French Revolution, 1789-1793". The American Historical Review. 15 (3): 601–602. doi:10.2307/1835202. ISSN 0002-8762. JSTOR 1835202.
- Osofsky, Stephen (1979). Peter Kropotkin. Boston: Twayne Publishers. ISBN 978-0-8057-7724-6. OCLC 4497420.
- BRD 1910
