= Nannie Dryhurst =

Irish nationalist writer (1856–1930)

Nannie Florence Dryhurst
- Born: Hannah Anne Robinson; 17 June 1856; Dublin, Ireland
- Died: 1930 (aged 73–74)
- Spouse: Alfred Robert Dryhurst (m. 1884)

Nannie Florence Dryhurst (born Hannah Anne Robinson; 17 June 1856 – 1930) was an Irish writer, translator, activist and nationalist.

== Personal life ==
Hannah Anne Robinson was born on 17 June 1856 in Dublin to Alexander Robinson and Emily Egan. Her father was a dyer. She was known as Nannie to her sisters and she decided to change her name to Nannie Florence in honour of a young friend who had died. As a result she was known variously (and following her marriage) as N.F. Dryhurst, Nannie, Nora and Florence Dryhurst.

After the death of her father, Dryhurst took a position as a governess as she spoke fluent French, German and Irish as well as having considerable skill as an artist. She worked first in Ireland and then in London. She looked after a doctor's daughter, Nellie Tenison, and through them she may have met the Dryhurst family. In 1882 she became engaged to British Museum official Alfred Robert Dryhurst and married him in August 1884. Their first daughter Norah was born in 1885 and the second, Sylvia, in 1888.

== Anarchism ==
Dryhurst soon got involved with an anarchist group and wrote regularly for the Freedom newspaper. She was friends with Charlotte Wilson and acted as editor when Wilson was away and in the early 1890s she took over as editor completely for some time. She also worked as a translator for Peter Kropotkin's works. Dryhurst spent time teaching with Wilson, Agnes Henry, and Cyril Bell at the International Anarchist School set up in Fitzroy Square in London by Louise Michel. Dryhurst gave active support to Spanish refugees fleeing repression and gave money to support the colony at Clousden Hill from 1895 to 1902.

== Nationalist ==
Dryhurst supported a number of different countries attempting to gain independence. She became secretary of the Nationalities and Subject Races Committee and used her writing in working towards Irish Independence. She wrote for various Irish newspapers and assisted with the creation of The Irish Citizen. A friend of W. B. Yeats, she appeared in his play The Land of Heart’s Desire in June 1904. She spoke Georgian having learned it from Varlam Cherkezov, a close associate of Kropotkin. In 1906 she was a member of the Georgian Relief Committee and travelled to the country. She spoke at an international conference at The Hague in support of Georgia. She was also a supporter of Indian independence.

It was through Dryhurst that the Gifford sisters got their connection to the Irish independence movement. She introduced Muriel Gifford to Thomas McDonagh and Grace Gifford to Joseph Plunkett After the executions of 15 leaders of the Easter Rising in Dublin, Dryhurst spent her time campaigning unsuccessfully for the reprieve of Roger Casement. Not all her activities were purely political. Dryhurst was a neighbour of Martin Shaw and on her suggestion he founded the Purcell Operatic Society in 1899. She became the Society's secretary. He rented accommodation near her and through her friends they found talented amateurs to put on their productions.

Dryhurst had a long affair with Henry Nevinson, a journalist she met in 1892. The affair ended in 1912. Dryhurst died in 1930. Her papers are kept in the Irish National Library.

== Bibliography ==
=== Translator ===
- Researches in the history of economics
- The great French Revolution, 1789-1793

=== Author ===
- Nationalities and subjects races report of conference held in Caxton hall
