= François Bazin (sculptor) =

French sculptor

- Born: 31 October 1897; Paris, France
- Died: 1956 (aged 58–59); Paris
- Occupation: Sculptor

François Bazin was born in Paris on 31 October 1897 and died in Paris in 1956. His parents were engravers and medalists. Early years were spent in Chile where his parents taught at the Santiago art college. The family returned to Paris in 1913 and Bazin enrolled at the Paris École des Beaux-Art. He was mobilized in 1916 and attached to a squadron whose planes were equipped with Hispano Suiza engines. After the war he completed his studies and was runner-up for the Prix de Rome in 1925. Although not a Breton many of his works can be seen in Brittany including "The monument aux bigoudens", the monument at the Pointe de Pen Hir and the "Filles de la mer" statue at Quimper.

== "La Volonté" ==
The École nationale supérieure Beaux-arts in Paris have traditionally kept in their collections, the works of former students and have Bazin's plaster bust "La Volonté" which he completed for the school's competition "La Tête d'expression" in 1922.

== Pointe de Pen-Hir ==
The 1949 Monument to the Bretons of Free France, known as the Cross of Pen-Hir, is located here. It celebrates the activities of the group of Free French Britons who founded Sao Breiz in Great Britain during the Second World War. The monument was designed by the architect Jean-Baptiste Mathon and the sculptural work is by Bazin. The monument was commissioned by the "Association des Français Libres" and the plot of land on which the monument stands was a gift from the commune of Camaret-sur-Mer, its proximity to the sea recalling the route taken by a number of Bretons to reach English shores. The architect Jean-Baptiste Mathon was greatly involved in the reconstruction of Brest after the end of the 1939-1945 war and he chose to design a monument shaped like the Cross of Lorraine. Bazin's sculpture has been described as "cubist".

There are two inscriptions

"Aux Bretons de la France Libre - MCMXL - MCMXLV - La France a perdu une bataille, mais la France n'a pas perdu la guerre. Dans l'univers libre des forces immenses n'ont pas encore donné. Un jour ces forces écraseront l'ennemi"

and

"Kentoc'h mervel eget em zaotra"

taken from the motto of Brittany "death rather than defilement".

== The monument aux bigoudens ==
Bazin's sculpture by the side of the river at Pont-l'Abbé captures the women of a Breton family worrying over the fate of the fishermen in their family out at sea in a storm. He executed the work in 1931. The women depicted cover five generations of a family and we have the grandmother, the mother, the sister, and two young daughters and in their faces Bazin tries to capture their anxiety, their sadness and their resignation to fate. The work is completed with two bas-reliefs depicting scenes from Celtic and Breton mythology. The women wear bigouden costume. There are two inscriptions, " Aux Bigoudens" and "Terre de pardons et de légendes". The sculpture was shown at the 1929 Salon and was awarded a gold medal and the "Prix National". The monument stands in the Saint-Laurent wood near the Notre Dames des Carmes church. The lighthouses of Eckmühl and Ar Men, the flight of Saint-Guénolé and King Gradlon, Tristan, Yseult and Morhold, the Bag-Noz, Morgane, the trespass of Ker-d Ys, Dahut, King Arthur and the "Round table" and the fairy Viviane and Merlin all figure in Bazin's elaborate bas-reliefs.

== "Aux filles de la mer" ==
Bazin completed this sculpture in 1935. He presents us with two Breton women, one from Sein and the other from Ouessant who stand in front of a Menhir awaiting the return of their men from sea, a theme favoured by Bazin as with his study of the bigouden women at Pont-L’abbé. This sculpture stands near the Pont Firmin in the rue Jacques Cartier in Quimper.

== "Etalon breton" ==
This bronze Bazin sculpture dating to 1939 is kept in Quimper's Préfecture du Finistère.

== Works in porcelain ==
Many of Bazin's works were produced in porcelain, one such being "Aviateur" which Sèvres brought out in 1931. An example is held in Allier's Musée Vichy.

== Cachan monument to the F.F.I ==
This Bazin sculpture is to be found at the corner of the rue de la Division Leclerc and the avenue Vatier in Cachan and is dedicated "Aux héros F.F.I. de Cachan tués en combat le 21 Août 1944". It remembers the members of the Free French Forces killed fighting the Germans on 21 August 1944.

== The tomb of Monseigneur Duparc. Bishop of Quimper ==
Bazin executed this bronze of Adolphe Duparc in 1946 and it can be seen in Quimper's Cathédrale Saint-Corentin.

== Memorial to Julia Guillou at Pont-Aven ==
Pont-Aven was much favoured as a base by many French artists and Julia Guillou ran the "l’Hôtel de Voyageurs", several artist's studios and the "Villa Julia" at Port-Manech. Pierre-Auguste Renoir stayed at the hotel in 1893. Bazin was commissioned to add a sculpture to this memorial in Gouillou's honour.

== Memorial to the aviator J.Cazale ==
It was at Buc that Louis Blériot created an airfield in 1909/1910 and founded l’École d’aviation which in 1915 became the "Ecole d’aviation militaire". Bazin created the sculpture for a granite monument to the aviator J.Cazale, erected at the airfield and it is not known if this still exists.

== Monument to Jean Bourhis ==
Bazin's sculpture can be seen in Bannalec. Bourhis was born in Bannalec and was one of the early French aviators and a test pilot working with Blériot. He was also a pioneer parachutist. Served as a pilot in the 1914-1918 war, he was badly injured in 1916 in combat with several German planes in the vicinity of Verdun and died shortly after. His body was returned to Bannalec in 1922 for re-burial. A monument in his memory was erected in Bannalec's place de l’église and Bazin was commissioned to sculpt Bourhis' bust for this monument. This work is in bronze and is positioned on a pedestal to which Blazin added two bas-reliefs. One recalls Bourhis' 1913 flight over the Bannalec church tower and the other his role as parachutist. On the monument is inscribed

"Edifié sous l’égide des dix membres d’un comité privé organisateur d’un meeting aérien à Bannalec le 31 aout 1930 avec le reliquat de cette fête complété par une souscription publique. Septembre 1932"

== Collège Louise-Michel in Paris ==
Bazin executed this bas-relief in 1936 for the front of the college.

== Mascots for automobile bonnets ==
Bazin created many mascots for car bonnets ("les bouchons de radiateur") such as "Triomphe" shown here. His "Femme Mangbetu" featured on Citroën's car competing in the "Croisière Noire" in 1924. He often worked with Louis Lejeune Ltd. His car mascots include "Cigogne" for the Hispano Suiza, "Tête de Femme Mangbetu" for Citroën, "Triomphe" for the Isotta Fraschini, "Tête d'éléphant" for the Latil, "Centaure" for the Unic and "Licorne" for the Licorne.

== Medals ==
Bazin was an accomplished medallist and his work for Monnaie de Paris includes medals for the Quimper Chambre de Commerce. the Caisse Epargne in Quimper, the Brest Chambre de Commerce, the centenary of the Caisse Epargne of Rennes, the Caisse Epargne at Quimperlé, the ocean liner "Pasteur" and the city of Tananarive.
