= Walsall Anarchists =

The Walsall Anarchists were a group of anarchists arrested on explosive charges in Walsall, present-day West Midlands, England in 1892.

Recent research into police files has revealed that the bombings were instigated by Auguste Coulon, an agent provocateur of Special Branch Inspector William Melville, who would go on to become an early official of what became MI5.

== Initial arrests ==
On 6 January 1892, an anarchist from Walsall named Joe Deakin was arrested on Tottenham Court Road, London, and the next day was charged with manufacturing bombs at the Great Marlborough Street Magistrates Court. Following the trial, a number of other anarchists including Victor Cails, Fred Charles, William Ditchfield, John Westley and Jean Battola, were also arrested and jointly charged with manufacturing explosives. When they first appeared at the police court in Walsall, the prosecution asked for the defendants to be remanded for a week, claiming that "[t]he authorities both in Walsall and London had received very important information with reference to what he might call a widespread conspiracy throughout the country."

== Evidence ==
The evidence that was presented by the prosecution included a number of allegations that the defendants possessed materials for the construction of explosives:

Charles was accused of possessing plans written in French for the construction a bomb, as well as a model for an explosive bolt and a French manifesto written by Cails called The Means of Emancipation, which included a call to manufacture and use explosives.
Cails was accused of possessing a fuse and several French Anarchist publications, one of which was L'International issue 7, which detailed instructions for the manufacture of explosives and how to use them in the demolition of buildings.
Ditchfield was accused of having a plaster cast for building a bomb in his workshop, an explosive bolt in his home and an amount of clay (mixed together with hair) in the Socialist Club's basement.

All six were remanded in custody, although no explosives were actually found and there was no evidence as regards the other three defendants.

== Subsequent arrests and confessions ==
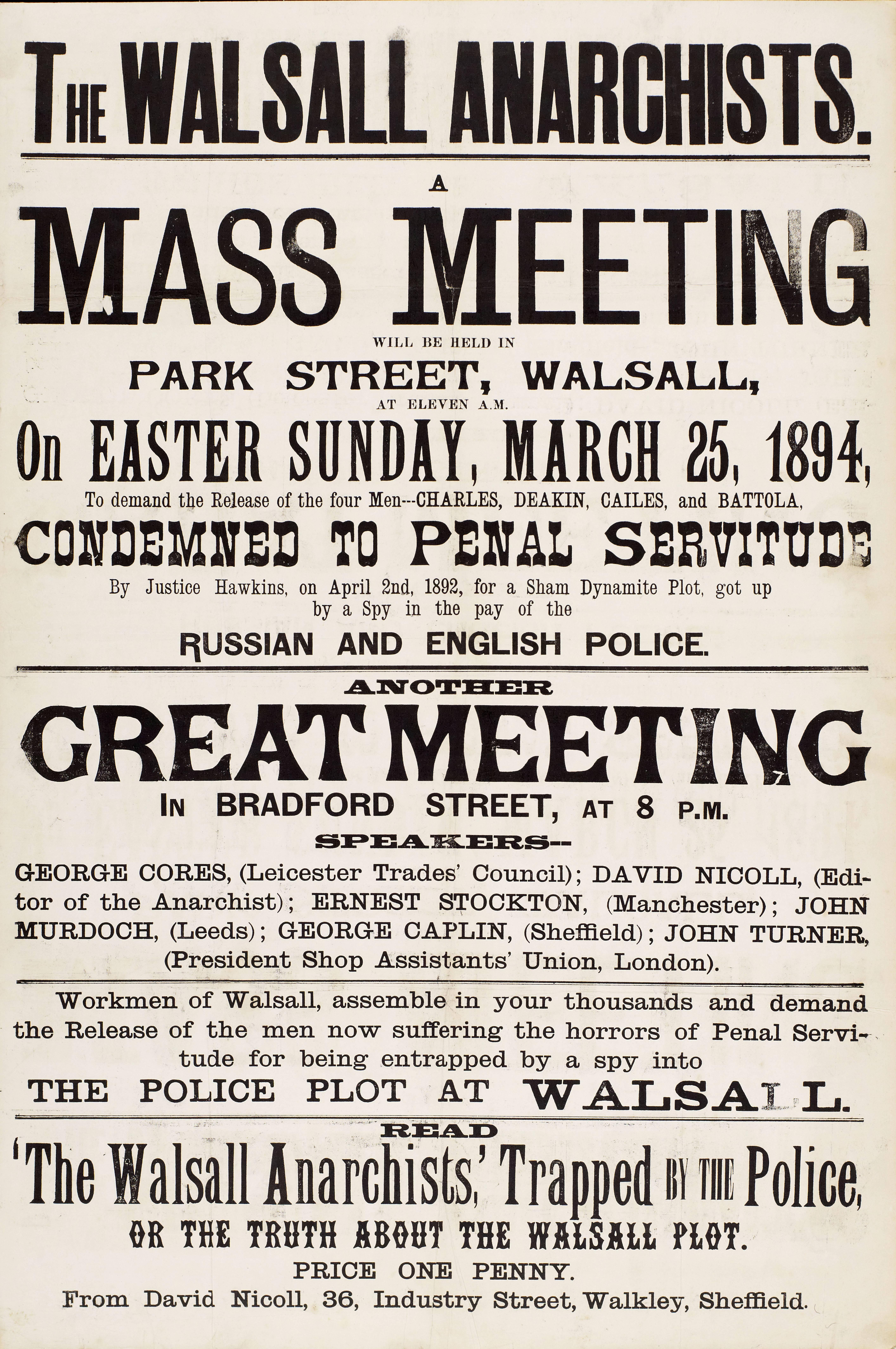
Poster advertising a meeting on 25 March 1894 in support of the release of the Walsall Anarchists Charles, Deakin, Cails, and Battola. The poster attributes their convictions to "a Sham Dynamite Plot" concocted by "a spy in the pay of the Russian and British police.

Under the false belief that Charles was an informant, Deakin made a confession. However, his confession also implicated Auguste Coulon, a French anarchist, who worked as an assistant in the International Anarchist School set up by Louise Michel in order to educate foreign socialists' children in London. He was also involved in trying to organise chemistry classes and translating and circulating information about bomb making. The police also arrested a Swiss inventor called Cavargna, the inventor of a number of small explosives that were used to exterminate rabbits in Australia, who was released from jail after two days. A further person named McCormack, who had been recently expelled from the socialist club in Walsall, offered to become an informant for the police, who soon decided he was unreliable. He went to Birmingham where he sold his story to the newspaper for drinking money. After being arrested under charges of public intoxication, he promptly declared in court next day that the police had employed him to fabricate evidence against the Walsall Anarchists. Charles Mowbray and David Nicoll were soon also arrested on conspiracy charges.

Following his release, Nicoll was raising money for the Walsall anarchists when, by chance, Coulon's brother let slip that Coulon himself was a police agent. The defence brought up the situation at the police court and gave Coulon's address asking why he had not been arrested as well. After Nicoll had set up an anarchist defence fund, Edward Carpenter set up one which raised money in socialist circles. Their different political outlook was especially noticeable as regards to what extent they felt the whole trial was a case of police provocation.

== Atmosphere of the trial and conviction ==
The case aroused media attention, particularly around two texts: the Means of Emancipation and The Anarchist Feast at The Opera – the latter described how the maximum amount of damage could be done to an opera house by rupturing its gas supply and leaving incendiary devices in the seats, while the miscreant could make their escape. Following three bombings in Paris, the correspondent for The Times made the connection: 'Anarchists should not be regarded as members of a political party, and it should not be possible for an Anarchist to hurry away from Paris to find an asylum in Brussels, in Geneva or in London.' Ravachol was arrested for two of these bombings, and promptly made a confession.

The climate of the trial was not conducive to a sober consideration of the facts – The Anarchist Feast at The Opera was read out as if it were the views of the defendants. The defense did not argue that it was a police plot. Charles, Cails and Battola were found guilty, Deakin was also found guilty but the jury recommended that the judge grant him mercy, while Westley and Ditchfield were found not guilty. Those found guilty were allowed to make a statement, whereupon the first three stated they thought it was a police plot. Charles, Battola and Cails were each sentenced to ten years in prison, while Deakin was sentenced to five years. Although the judge denied he was punishing them for being anarchists, The Times was more to the point:

The offence with which the prisoners were charged is one of the most dastardly and wicked which it is possible to conceive. Like treason it is aimed at the very heart of the State, but it is not designed to destroy the existing Government alone. It strikes at all Governments, and behind all Governments it strikes at those elementary social rights for the defence of which all forms and methods of civil rules exist. The crime of which the Walsall prisoners have been found guilty was no isolated act ( ... ) Hate, envy, the lust of plunder, and the lust of bloodshed are stamped on every line of the Anarchist literature read at Walsall and on every word of the confessions made by RAVACHOL.

'Alas! Alas! Ten years for Charles, it is too bad. An evil conscience makes them cowards.' wrote Edward Carpenter following the trial.
