= La Révolution Cosmopolite =

French anarchist newspaper (1886-1887)

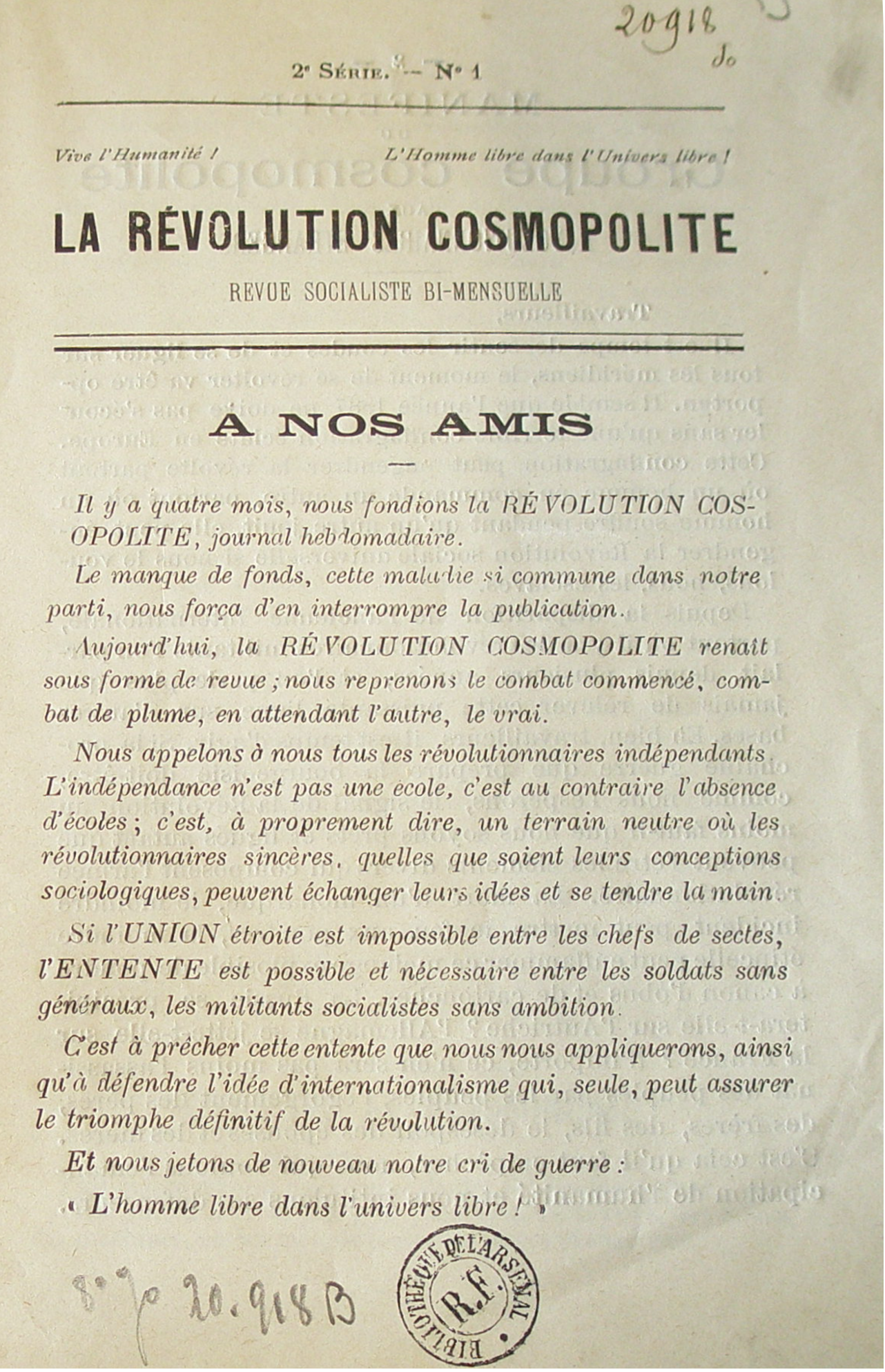
- First page of the first issue (2nd series) - courtesy of Archives anarchistes
- Founder(s): Charles Malato; Jacques Prolo; Louise Michel; Léon Ortiz
- Founded: 1886
- Political alignment: Anarchism
- Language: French
- Ceased publication: 1887
- Headquarters: Paris

La Révolution Cosmopolite (The Cosmopolitan Revolution) or La Révolution Cosmopolite: journal révolutionnaire socialiste indépendant (The Cosmopolitan Revolution: Independent socialist revolutionary newspaper), was an anarchist newspaper published between 1886 and 1887 by various anarchist militants, including Charles Malato, Jacques Prolo, Louise Michel, and Léon Ortiz. The newspaper ceased publication after being prosecuted for "incitement to murder and pillage".

It was one of the 1880s anarchist publications in France, playing a role in the birth and establishment of the anarchist movement there. The newspaper is also considered to have introduced revolutionary internationalism to France, aiming to unite anarchists and revolutionaries on an international level. Additionally, due to Louise Michel's numerous contributions, it was one of the first publications to give a platform to women activists in France.

== History ==
=== Context ===
Like l'Endehors later, or a number of publications from nascent Symbolism and Decadentism, this newspaper originated from the Cercle de la Butte. This influence was noted by Gabriel Randon, who argued that this Circle was subdivided into four parts: naturalists, decadents, symbolists, and anarchists. Each of these groups represented the main French intellectual and artistic movements of the following decade. According to Randon, each of these four subgroups of the Circle produced their own press organs; in the case of the anarchists, it was La Révolution cosmopolite.

=== La Révolution Cosmopolite (1886-1887) ===
Within the Cercle de la Butte, Charles Malato and Jacques Prolo, both anarchist militants, established an anarchist group and, in September 1886, founded the newspaper. Its upcoming publication was announced in Peter Kropotkin and Jean Grave's Le Révolté, and the first issue hit the stands. Léon Ortiz, a prominent illegalist anarchist militant of the period, and the renowned anarchist militant Louise Michel also contributed to the paper. Ortiz, in particular, was the poorest of the contributors. Among other contributors was Georges Deherme, who notably advocated for the union of all socialist groups within a federation that would respect their unique characteristics.

The newspaper's main objective was to promote a form of revolutionary internationalism. As part of the nascent French anarchist movement, this publication was one of the earliest anarchist papers in France. It was also the first revolutionary publication to break away from a purely French focus and embrace an international struggle, and one of the first to allow women activists to participate and publish within its pages.

The newspaper released 5 issues of its second series in 1887. However, its run was cut short when it faced trial for "incitement to murder and pillage" in April-May 1887, leading to its discontinuation.

=== Louise Michel ===
Louise Michel's contributions to the journal, which she joined from the very first issue, were significantly important in the evolution of her thinking and her artistic, philosophical, and political perspectives. It was in this publication that she began to show a strong interest in writing as a revolutionary weapon. Her initial article, a defense of her involvement with the newspaper, highlighted the dynamics of the anarchist movement at the time, which was increasingly turning to the press.

Michel also published her poems in the journal, where she intertwined various ideas, particularly artistic and political concepts. She blended aesthetic exploration with the pursuit of revolution and the freedom promised by anarchists. More broadly, her quest for a "revolutionary poetics" undertaken in the journal marked a pivotal point in her intellectual development.

== Legacy ==
The circles involved in this newspaper were closely linked to those that participated in l'Endehors a few years later.

== Works ==
=== Second series (1887) - courtesy of Archives anarchistes ===
==== 1st issue (full) (March) ====
- À nos amis, explaining their motives by publishing the issue
- Manifeste du Groupe cosmopolite aux révolutionnaires étrangers by Léon Ortiz, manifesto of their thought and internationalism
- Commune et Communisme by Charles Malato, criticizing the Paris Commune
- Citoyen ou Compagnon ? by Jacques Prolo, debating the use of 'citizen' or 'companion' for anarchists
- Souvenez-vous ! by Raoul Odin, antimilitarist text calling soldiers to revolt
- L'action individuelle by Alain Gouzien, early European individualist anarchism (?) and support for propaganda by the deed
- La Crise, la Guerre et la Révolution by Yves Plessis, analysis of the necessity of revolutionary struggle
- Mouvement cosmopolite by Spartaco (?), Platon Drakoulis and Raoul Odin, giving news about the anarchist movement in Italy, Greece, England and France.

==== 2nd issue (full) (March-April) ====
- Nos poursuites, speaking about the trial of Raoul Odin and Pons (manager of the publication) for his Souvenez-vous ! article in the previous issue
- Malgré Tout !, by Raoul Odin, defending his Souvenez-vous ! stance and doubling down
- L’Esprit de Révolte, by Alain Gouzien, commenting on the news and how they would show the 'Spirit of Revolt' propagating
- Guerre à la guerre !, by Léon Ortiz, antimitarist text calling the soldiers to revolt against the bourgeoisie
- Les Jeunes et les Vieux, by Charles Malato, speaking about the generational gap between militants and that the youth would be anarchist
- L’anarchie en Italie, by Mene-Lite (?), speaking about anarchism in Italy
- Les Rapaces — I, by Louise Michel, first part of a novel, following the trajectory of Breton women
- Mouvement cosmopolite by A. Delcluse and unidentified foreign correspondents, giving news about the anarchist movement in France, Spain, USA and Armenia. Support for propaganda by the deed in the latter case.
- Les Français de Londres, by Lucien Pemjean, first part of a report given on the situation of French exiles in London
- La Cosmopolitaine, by Jacques Prolo, song about the journal and the anarchist struggle

==== 3rd issue (full) (April) ====
- Nos poursuites — II, speaking about the trial of Odin and Pons
- Le procès Duval, by Cassius (a friend of Blanqui according to Malato), debating the Duval affair and illegalism
- Les Justiciers, by Raoul Odin, defending illegalism
- Aux va-nu-pieds la Chambre, by Couteaux (?), defending antiparliamentarism and revolution
- À l’action, by Palmiro Perini, call to revolutionary action
- Les Rapaces — II/III , by Louise Michel, the following of her novel, covering chapters 2 and chapter 3
- Les Français de Londres — II, by Lucien Pemjean, second part of his report
- Mouvement cosmopolite, by Caio Siro Baraldi 'Ciro', speaking about anarchism in his town of Mantua (Italy)
- Êtes-vous contents ?, by Jacques Prolo, criticizing proto-fascists Paul Déroulède and Boulangists

==== 4th issue (full) (April) ====
- L’Union révolutionnaire — I, by Cassius, first part of a text dwelling on problems revolving around the union of different revolutionary movements
- Les Français de Londres — III by Lucien Pemjean, third part of his report on the situation of French exiles in London
- À ceux de Paris by Charles Malato, text calling the French and German workers to avoid fighting between themselves and unite against the French Republic and the German Empire
- Égalité, by Zirto (?), small text describing anarchism
- Principes, by Léon Ortiz, small text describing anarchism
- La Croix Rouge, by Henri-Charles Détré (not sure that it's him ?), antimilitarist and anti-authoritarian text
- La Ronde des Démolisseurs, by Auguste Saint-Denis, song calling to 'demolish' capitalism and the 'old times'
- Les Rapaces — IV, by Louise Michel, 4th chapter of her novel, starting to speak about anarchism
- Indifférence, by Louis Besse, call to revolution and the youth
- Mouvement cosmopolite, by Goetsch and maybe a Bulgarian correspondant (?), speaking about the situation in Germany and Bulgaria

==== 5th issue (full) (April-May) ====
- L’Union révolutionnaire — II by Cassius, second part of the text started in the previous issue
- Merci, Raoul Odin and Pons sentenced to 3 months in jail, first issue of this list sentenced to be destroyed (for the Souvenez-vous ! publication)
- Trois mois de prison by Raoul Odin, where he speaks about his sentence and doubles down on doing anarchist propaganda to the army. He says the issue is published under his name so that nobody else is sentenced.
- Patrie ! by Alexandre Tennevin, criticism of the idea of 'Fatherland'
- L’Idée Cosmopolite, small internationalist text discussing Algeria and Australia
- Les Français de Londres — IV by Lucien Pemjean, fourth part of his raport on the situation of French exiles in London
- République Sociale by Charles Malato, call to revolution and description of an anarchist 'republic', the 'Social Republic', which would be drastically opposed to the liberal French 'Republic'.
- Les Rapaces — IV (2) by Louise Michel, 4th chapter of the novel she started in the other issues
- Mouvement cosmopolite, by Dansaert (?), speaking about the situation in Belgium and dwelving into military related matters
- Ça et Là by Cariolus (?), small text speaking about how the 'difference of races' would explain why some countries and areas would be more anarchist than the others

=== External links ===
- Issues of the whole second series (1-5) on Archives anarchistes : (1)

== Bibliography ==
- Bantman, Constance (2017), Reassessing the Transnational Turn - Scales of Analysis in Anarchist and Syndicalist Studies, Oakland: Routledge, ISBN 978-1-62963-391-6
- Tardif, Marie-Pier (2021), Ni ménagères, ni courtisanes. Les femmes de lettres dans la presse anarchiste française (1885-1905) (PhD thesis) [Neither housewives nor courtesans. Women writers in the French anarchist press (1885-1905)] (PDF)
