= Pointe de Pen-Hir =

Coordinates: 48°15′15″N 4°37′19″W

The memorial

The pointe de Pen-Hir (Breton – Beg Penn Hir) is a promontory of the Crozon peninsula in Brittany, to the south-west of Camaret-sur-Mer. On a clear day there are views to the Pointe du Raz and the islands of Sein and Ouessant and to Pointe Saint-Mathieu. The cliffs are as tall as 70 metres (230 ft) high.

It is the site of the Monument to the Bretons of Free France, known as the Cross of Pen-Hir and inaugurated by General Charles de Gaulle in 1960. It is intended to bear witness to the group of Free French Bretons who founded Sao Breiz in Great Britain during the Second World War. It was created in 1949–1951 by architect Jean-Baptiste Mathon and sculptor Victor-François Bazin.

« Aux Bretons de la France Libre – MCMXL – MCMXLV – La France a perdu une bataille, mais la France n'a pas perdu la guerre. Dans l'univers libre des forces immenses n'ont pas encore donné. Un jour ces forces écraseront l'ennemi. »

"To the Bretons of Free France – MCMXL – MCMXLV – France has lost a battle, but France has not lost the war. In the free world immense forces have not yet given up. One day these forces will crush the enemy."

On the back of the cross is an inscription in Breton, "Kentoc'h mervel eget em zaotra", taken from the motto of Brittany: "death rather than defilement".
