= Victorine Brocher =

Communard and anarchist (1839–1921)

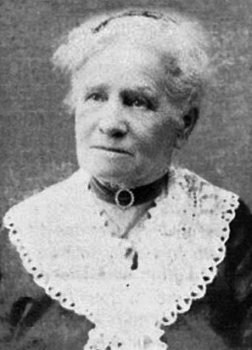
- Born: 4 September 1839; Paris, France
- Died: 4 November 1921 (aged 82); Lausanne, Switzerland

Victorine Brocher (1839–1921) was a Communard and anarchist. She participated in the Paris Commune and later wrote a memoir detailing her experience. Brocher was a delegate to the 1881 London Anarchist Congress and a contributor to anarchist periodicals throughout her life. Brocher cofounded and taught at Louise Michel's international school.

== Life and career ==
Marie Victorine Malenfant was born on in Paris on 4 September 1839. She was raised by her mother in Orleans after her father, a republican, fled to Belgium in 1851.

In the 1860s, she married Jean Rouchy and participated in the founding of a cooperative bakery. They also participated in the First International and had two children, who died young.

She was a cantinière during the Paris Commune and was commended for her bravery in her care for the wounded in late April 1871. Victorine went into hiding for a year after being arrested and sentenced to death for setting the Court of Auditors on fire and subsequently absconded to Geneva. She was considered dead when her mother mistakenly identified her among the remains of those shot dead at Versailles. Her husband remained in prison.

In Geneva, Victorine lived and attended First International meetings in Geneva before moving to Hungary to tutor. In 1874, with her husband released from prison, they returned to Geneva, where Victorine worked as a shoemaker and participated in the Jura Federation and anarchists including Paul Brousse, Elisée Reclus, and Andrea Costa.

Likely after the amnesty, she returned to Paris and served as a city delegate at the 1881 London Anarchist Congress. In London, she met Gustave Brocher. They married and raised several children. Victorine wrote for La Révolution sociale during this period. In 1883, she demonstrated with Louise Michel and Émile Pouget at Esplanade des Invalides. She continued to write for Le Cri du Peuple, La Lutte, and Le Drapeau noir. She trained in nursing following the 1884 death of Jean Rouchy.

Brocher co-founded and taught at Louise Michel's international school in London since 1886.

Brocher and her second husband relocated to Lausanne in 1892 where they operated a bookstore and youth boarding house until 1912. She published her memoirs, including her participation in the Paris Commune, in 1909. She also wrote for La Libre Fédération between 1915 and 1919. The couple lived in Fiume for two years, where her husband taught, and in Levallois-Perret. When Brocher became sick in 1921, they returned to Lausanne, where she died on 4 November.
