= Collège Louise-Michel in Paris =

Collège Louise-Michel
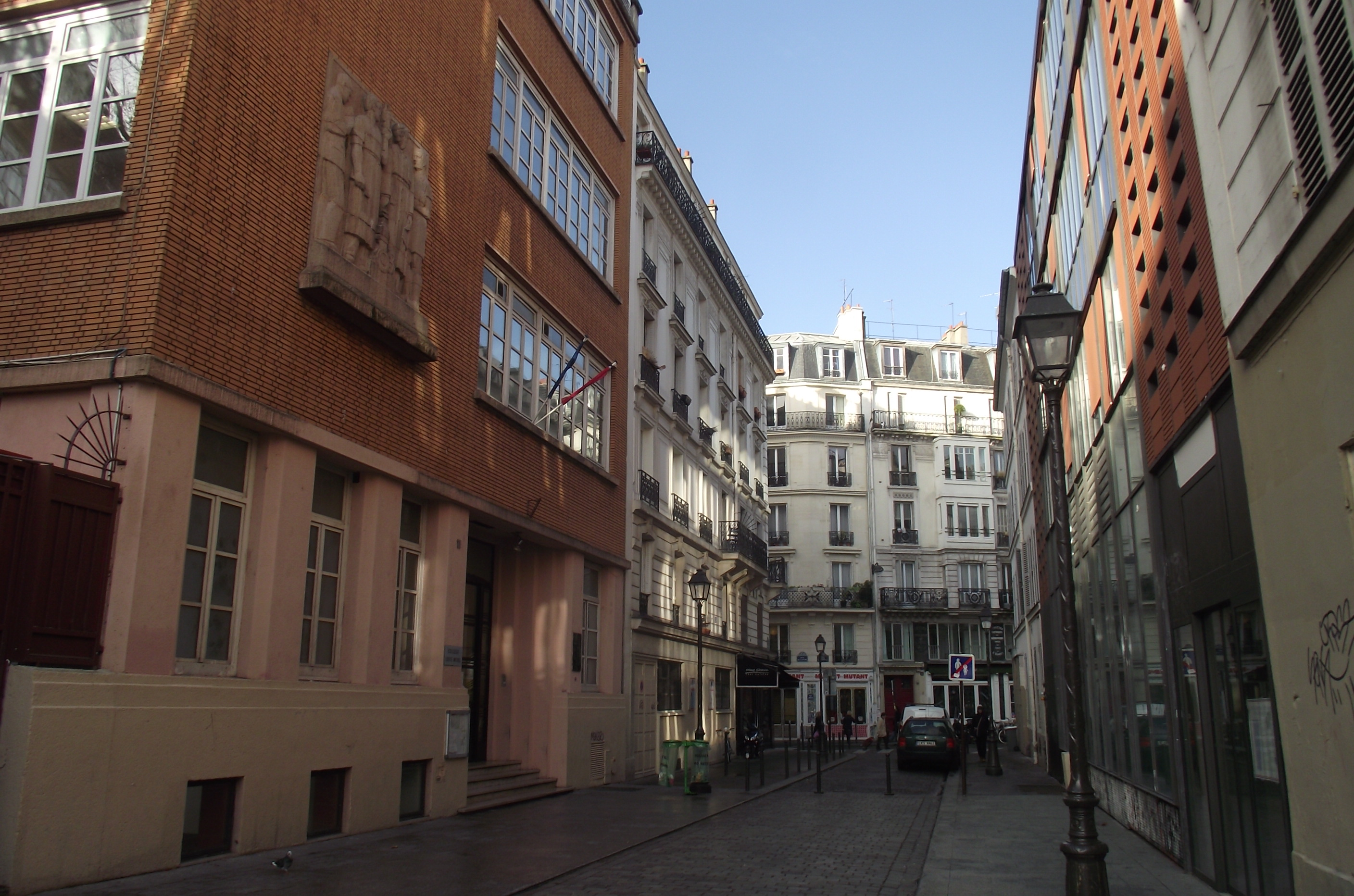
- Collège Louise-Michel on both sides of Jean-Poulmarch street

Address
- 11, rue Jean-Poulmarch; Paris; 75010; France
- Coordinates: 48.87224°N 2.363557°E

Information
- Type: Elementary school
- Enrollment: 502 (2013)
- Website: http://www.ac-paris.fr/serail/jcms/s2_157885/ee-clg-louise-michel-portail

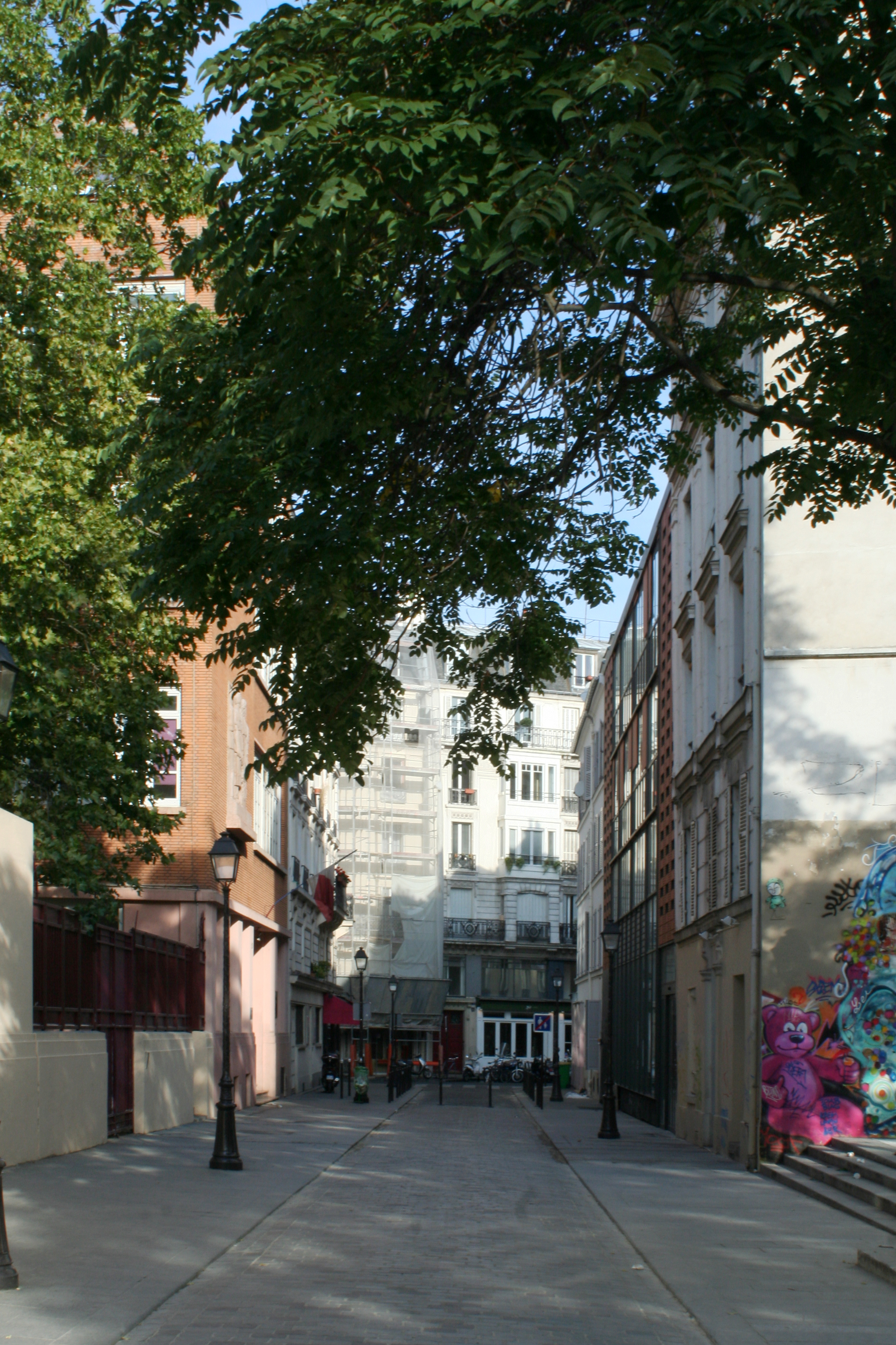
School buildings on both sides of Jean-Poulmarch street

The Collège Louis-Michel, named after French anarchist Louise Michel is located in Paris at 11 rue Jean-Poulmarch, on the bank of the canal Saint-Martin.

== Overview ==
Collège Louis-Michel is a secondary school of approximately 500 pupils from 11 to 15 years of age. Subjects taught include French, Chinese, German, Latin, Spanish and English.

The students are of 20 nationalities. The school is classified as "fr:Zone d'éducation prioritaire" (Priority Education Zone) which provides additional financial means and teaching aid.

== Construction ==
The first building was built by the architects Daniel and Lionel Brandon and assisted by Raoul Brandon based on a scheme dating back to 1933. The first stage was completed in July 1937 and the construction was finished in 1939 by Édouard Boegner. A bas-relief realized in 1936 by François Bazin, representing an allegory of education, decorates the facade.

In the beginning of the 2000s, the Departments of France wished to restructure and extend the Collège to adapt its premises to a capacity of 20 classes, improve the functioning of the cafeteria and increase the playground surface. Therefore, they bought a plot located on the other side of Jean-Poulmarch street for the construction of a second building. The Departments of France requested that the Council of Paris declassify the street in front of the existing building. As a result, it would be possible to build on-surface in order to provide a link between the 2 parts of the school.

In September 2002, a contest was launched for the construction of the new building, the reshuffling of the existing one, and to design a link between the 2 buildings in order to allow easy access for students between the two. However, the original submission did not successfully meet the criteria of linking the two sides of the street.

The contest and limitations were deemed a "Critical analysis of an architectural project with counter-proposal" for the "external and internal contest for hiring architects and town planners" organized in 2005 by the Transportation, Equipment, Tourism and Sea Ministry.

The new guidelines were to:

- Prepare a note to the Prefect, while looking into the relevance of the planning, especially the link between the projected construction and the street;
- Analyse the architecture and urban project;
- Propose modifications or alternative solutions.

The project of the Badia Berger firm of Architects was finally successfully agreed and delivered in June 2007.

Between 2002 and 2007 the second building was constructed, with a tunnel linking the two parts of the school.
