= Vroncourt-la-Côte =

- Commune
- Location of Vroncourt-la-Côte
- Location within France Location within Grand Est
- Coordinates: 48°08′57″N 5°30′38″E
- Country: France
- Region: Grand Est
- Department: Haute-Marne
- Arrondissement: Chaumont
- Canton: Poissons
- Intercommunality: Meuse Rognon

Government
  - Mayor (2020–2026): Gisèle Ladier
- Area^{1}: 4.19 km^{2} (1.62 sq mi)
- Elevation: 380 m (1,250 ft)
- Population (2023): 27
  - Density: 6.4/km^{2} (17/sq mi)
- Time zone: UTC+01:00 (CET)
  - Summer (DST): UTC+02:00 (CEST)
- INSEE/Postal code: 52549 /52240
- ^{1} French Land Register data, which excludes lakes, ponds, glaciers > 1 km^{2} (0.386 sq mi or 247 acres) and river estuaries.

Vroncourt-la-Côte (French pronunciation: [vʁɔ̃kuʁ la kot]) is a commune in the Haute-Marne department in north-eastern France.

== See also ==
- Communes of the Haute-Marne department
