= Rachel McMillan =

- Born: 25 March 1859; Throggs Neck, New York, US
- Died: 25 March 1917 (aged 58)
- Occupations: Health visitor and advisor on education

Rachel McMillan (1859–1917) was an American-born health visitor and advisor on education, who mainly worked in England. She came to notice due to the efforts of her sister Margaret McMillan, who memorialised her life after her death. Margaret named the Rachel McMillan Nursery School and Children's Centre after her sister Rachel in 1917, the year of her death.

== Life ==
McMillan was born in 1859 at Throggs Neck in New York state to Scottish emigrant parents. Her parents, James and Jane (born Cameron), had married the year before; they would have one other surviving daughter, Margaret. McMillan's father and an infant sister died in 1865 from scarlet fever, and their mother took the family back to Scotland. Rachel and Margaret were brought up in Inverness and attended the Inverness Academy. McMillan was there until she was fifteen, when she went to teach in Coventry for three years at a women's college.

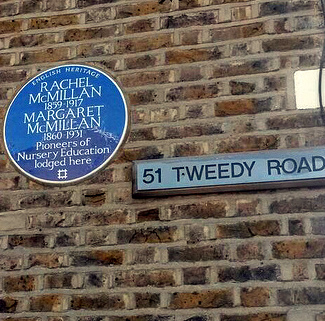
Rachel and Margaret McMillan plaque, Bromley

She did not take paid employment until her grandmother died in 1877, when she went to London and ran a hostel for women. She later qualified as a sanitary inspector in London and was appointed by Kent County Council where she worked for 17 years as a peripatetic teacher of hygiene.

McMillan's growing understanding and support for socialism were used in a case study of growing public understanding of the writings of William Morris and Karl Marx, but her claim to fame arrived after her death in 1917. As early as 1887, however, she had been converted to Christian Socialism by listening to sermons by the Rev. John Glasse.

Margaret renamed a nursery school which had been founded in 1914 the Rachel McMillan Nursery School.

McMillan's reputation as a convert relies on a valedictory biography written about her by her sister in 1927. Margaret had been nursed through a severe illness by Rachel. Rachel and Margaret had lived together at lodgings at 51 Tweedy Road in Bromley, and there they entertained well-known people including Pyotr Kropotkin, the Lansburys, Margaret Llewelyn Davies, and the Countess of Warwick. In 2009 English Heritage had a blue plaque placed on this house in Bromley to record Margaret and Rachel lodging there.

Margaret created the Rachel McMillan Training College in 1930. She not only named the college after her sister, but also ascribed the innovations in teaching there to McMillan. The biography that she wrote for her sister describes her as having an ideal childhood and being a leader in the development of child care and teacher training. McMillan was a hard working woman who worked with children, education and health issues, but her notable life appears to have been the creation of her sister.
