= Helen Crawfurd =

Scottish suffragette (1877–1954)

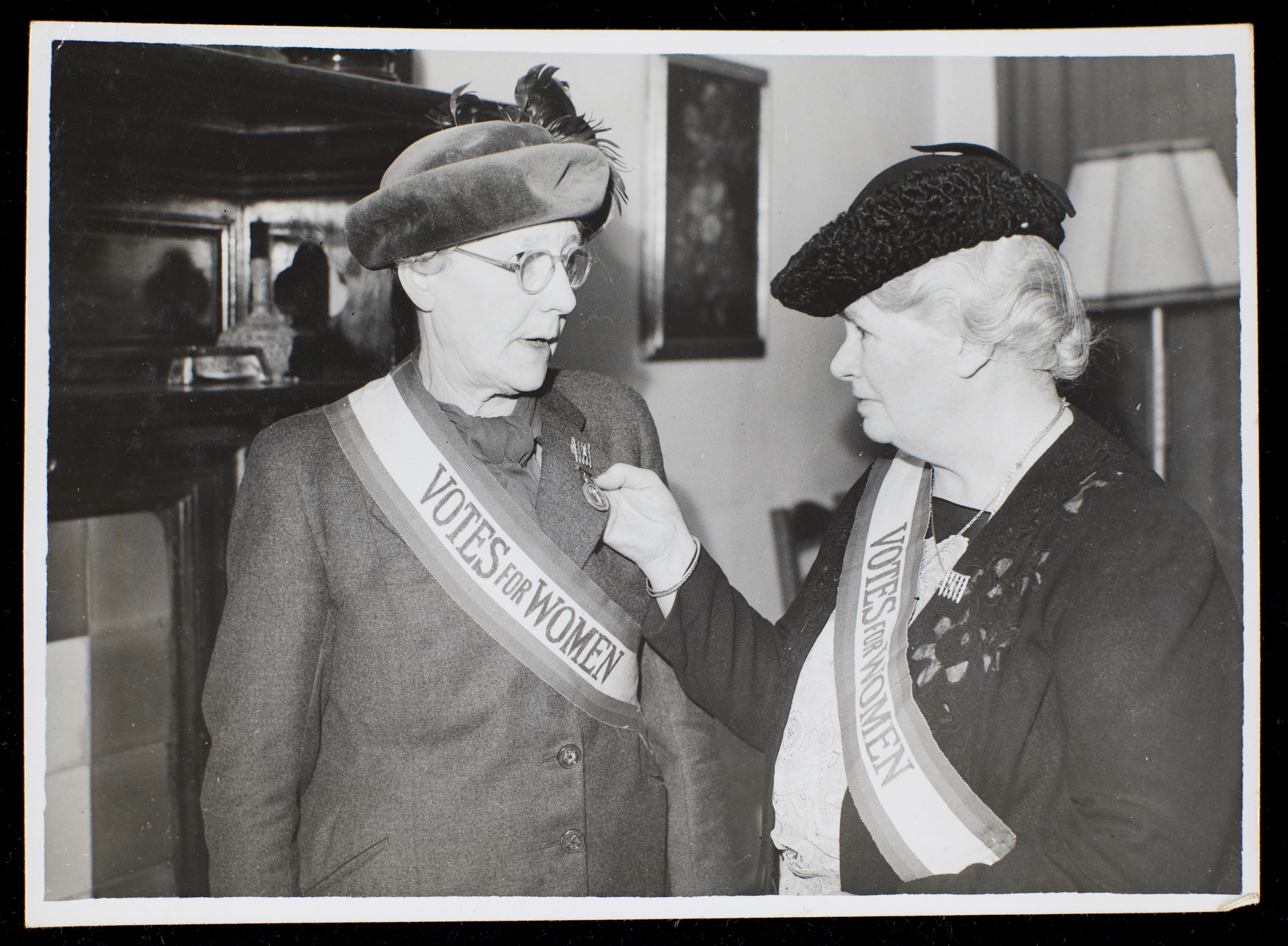
- Born: Helen Jack; 9 November 1877; Glasgow, Scotland
- Died: 18 April 1954 (aged 76); Dunoon, Scotland
- Occupations: Politician, activist, suffragette
- Notable work: Suffragette, activist, politician
- Spouses: Alexander Montgomerie Crawfurd; George Anderson

Helen Crawfurd (née Jack, later Anderson; 9 November 1877 – 18 April 1954) was a Scottish suffragette, rent strike organiser, Communist activist and politician. Born in Glasgow, she was brought up there and in London.

== Biography ==
Born Helen Jack at 175 Cumberland Street in the Gorbals area of Glasgow, her parents were Helen L. (née Kyle) and William Jack. Her mother worked a steam-loom before she wed. Helen's family moved to Ipswich while she was young. Crawfurd later went to school in London and Ipswich before moving back to Glasgow as a teenager. Crawfurd's father, a master baker, was a Catholic, but converted to the Church of Scotland and became a conservative trade unionist.

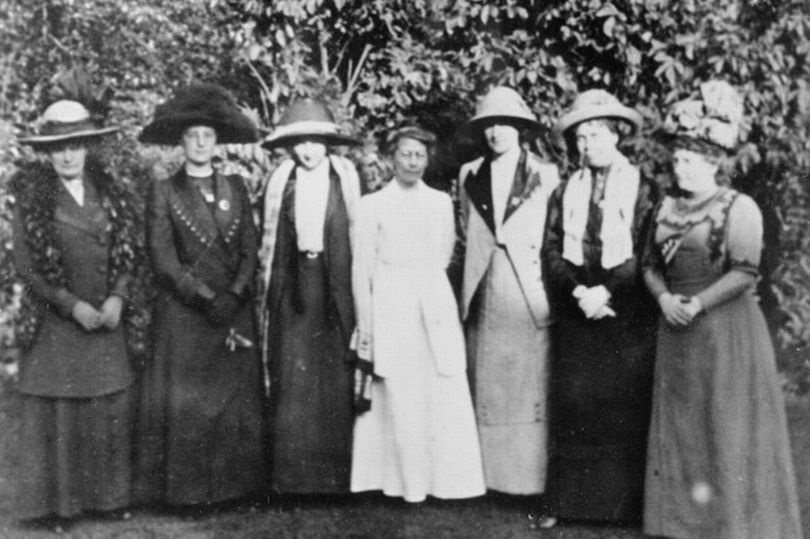
(L - R) Helen Crawfurd, Janet Barrowman, Margaret McPhun, Mrs A. A. Wilson, Frances McPhun, Nancy A. John and Annie S. Swan

Initially religious herself and a Sunday School teacher, Crawfurd felt a call to be married at 21 to the 67-year-old widower Alexander Montgomerie Crawfurd (29 August 1828 – 31 May 1914), a Church of Scotland minister and family friend. However, she became increasingly radical, after witnessing injustices, and what she deemed to be "un-Christian" behaviour from the Church. For example, not helping widows financially before they had sold all their belongings in their home. Alexander died, aged 85, at 17 Sutherland Street in Partick, Glasgow.

In 1944, Crawfurd remarried, to widower George Anderson of Anderson Brothers Engineers, Coatbridge. Her second husband was a member of the Communist Party of Great Britain. George Anderson died on 2 February 1952 and Crawfurd two years later at Mahson Cottage, Kilbride Avenue, Dunoon, Argyll, aged 76.

== Political activity ==
Crawfurd first became active in the women's suffrage movement in about 1900, then in 1910 at a meeting in Rutherglen. Agreeing with their tactics, Crawfurd became a member of the Women's Social and Political Union (WSPU) the same year. Crawfurd was jailed three times for "militant" political activity during her career as an activist. In 1912, Crawfurd smashed the windows of Jack Pease, Minister for Education, and received a one-month prison sentence. In March 1914, Crawfurd was arrested in Glasgow when Emmeline Pankhurst was speaking. She received another month in prison and went on an eight-day hunger strike. She spoke at the Music Hall, Aberdeen on 26 February 1914, in favour of militarism. But after one further arrest, Crawfurd left the WSPU in protest at its support of the First World War and in 1914 she joined the Independent Labour Party (ILP).

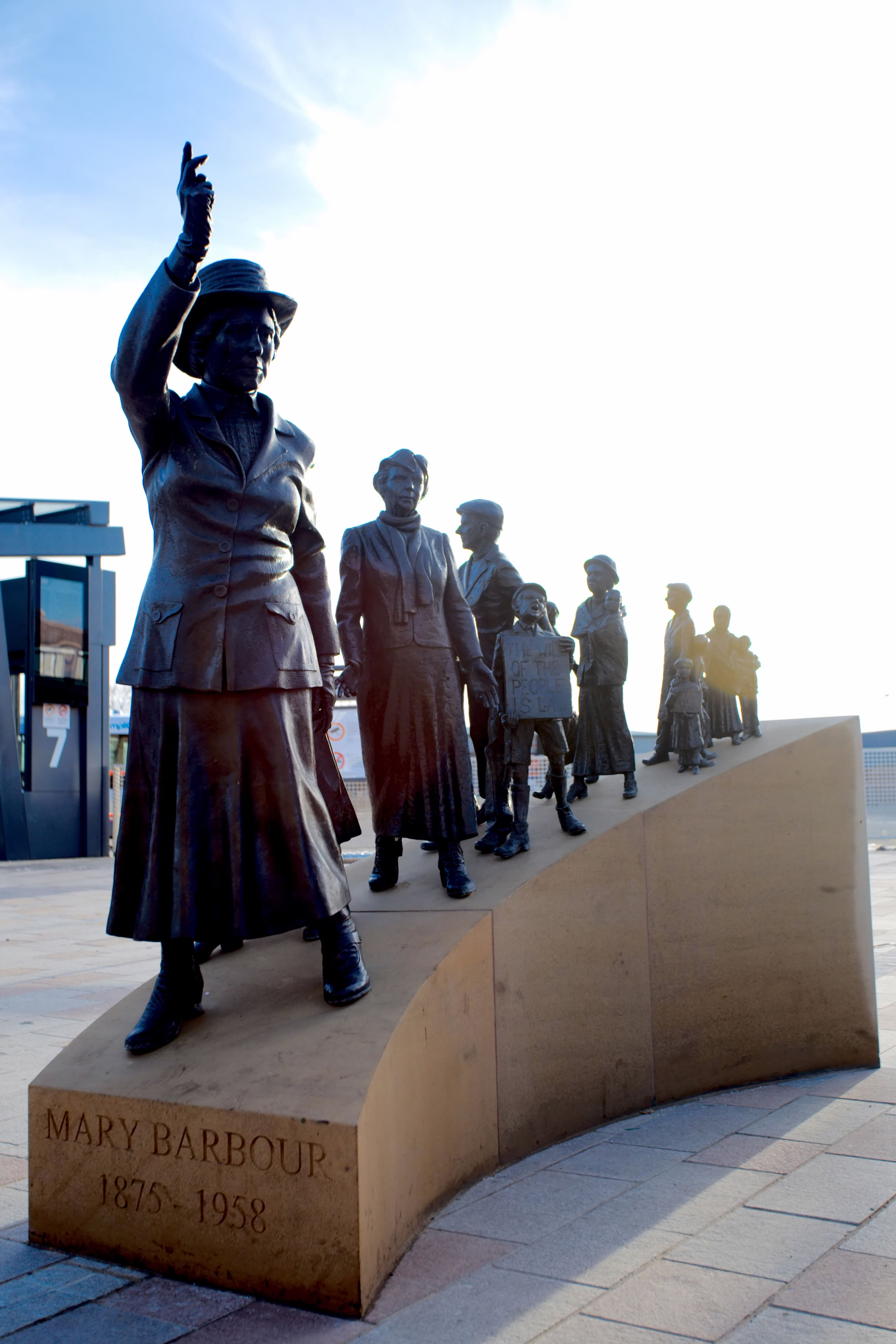
Mary Barbour Statue - Front view

During WWI, Crawfurd was involved with the Red Clydeside movement, including the Glasgow rent strikes in 1915 when she led the South Govan Women's Housing Association to resist rent increases and prevent evictions, alongside Mary Barbour, Mary Laird, Mary Jeff, Jessie Stephens and Agnes Dollan. Crawfurd had co-founded the Glasgow branch of the Women's International League and become secretary of the Women's Peace Crusade. By then she had met Agnes Harben and others, who held the same international perspectives. On 23 July 1916, Crawfurd organised the first demonstration of the Women's Peace Crusade, which was attended by 5,000. Crawfurd formed a branch of the United Suffragists in Glasgow. These women used the realms of domesticity entrenched within society to support their campaign, known as "Wives and Weans Socialism".

== Crawfurd's poems ==
in the William Gallacher Memorial Library collection relating to Crawfurd, there are five poems; three signed and two unsigned. The People's Voice published the lyrics of one of these, "Women shall be free", and includes a vocal rendition by Adam McNaughtan, which can be heard here https://thepeoplesvoice.glasgow.ac.uk/song-women-shall-be-free/

== The End of WWI ==
In 1918, Crawfurd was elected as vice-chair of the Scottish division of the Independent Labour Party (ILP), and was said to be a convincing speaker when she spoke in the Market Place at the branch meeting in Loftus. Shortly afterwards, Crawfurd became a founder member of the ILP's left-wing faction, which was campaigning for it to affiliate to the Communist International. Crawford went to Moscow in 1920, with Marjory Newbold, Sylvia Pankhurst, Willie Gallacher and others for the Congress of the Third Communist International and interviewed Lenin. Crawfurd announced her resignation from the Independent Labour Party in November 1921. When the affiliation policy was defeated, Crawfurd joined the new Communist Party of Great Britain (CPGB). She served on its Central Committee and involved herself in various journalistic projects. She also became secretary of Workers' International Relief.

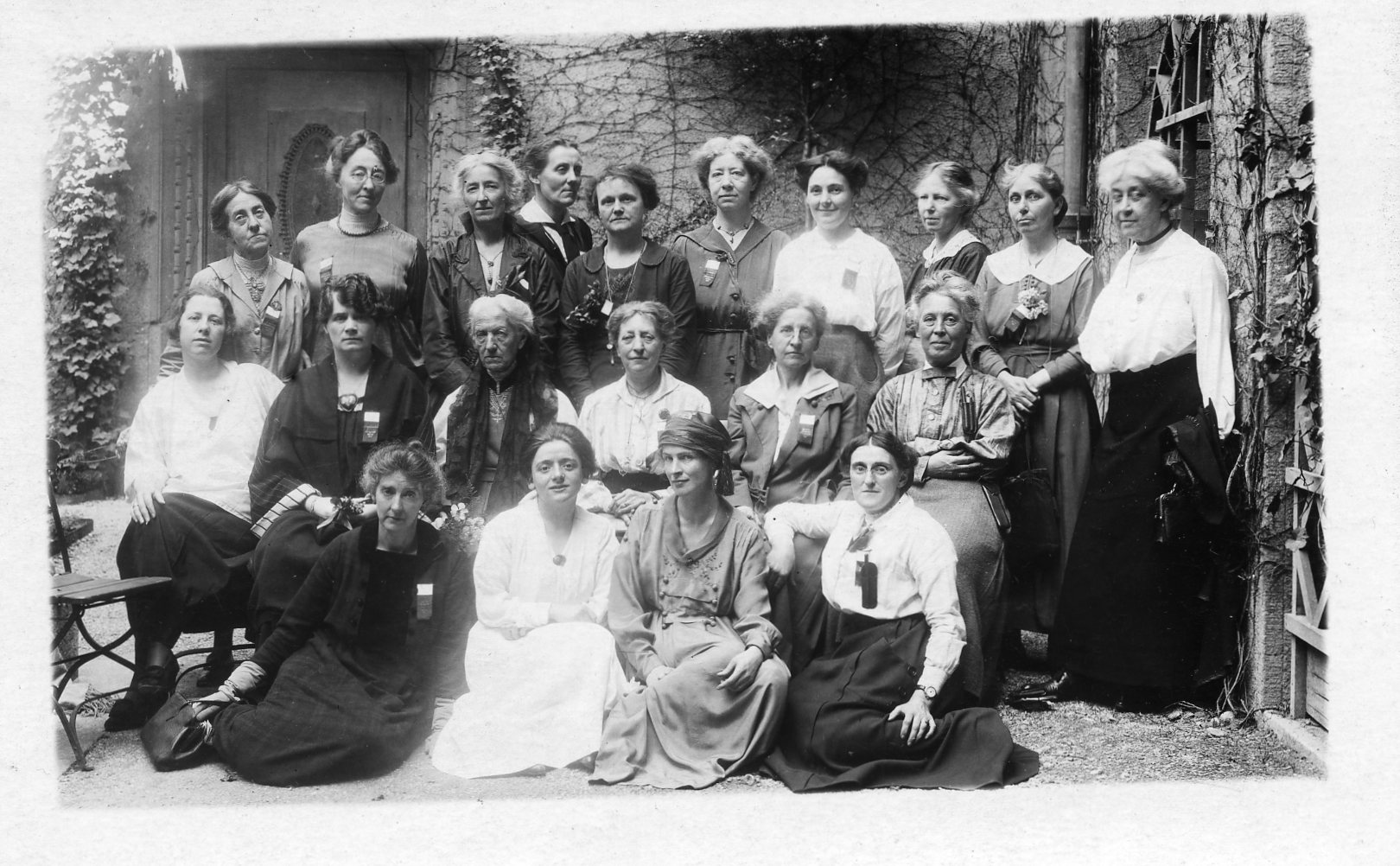
Helen Crawfurd: middle row, second from left- At Women's International League for Peace and Freedom Conference, Zurich, 1919

In 1919, Crawfurd was a delegate to the Congress of the Women's International League in Zürich.

Crawfurd ran in 1921 as the first Communist Party candidate in the Govan ward of Glasgow.. Also in 1921, Crawfurd spoke at a demonstration organised by the Glasgow Unemployment Committee in the City Hall. Fellow speakers were John Maclean and Patrick Dollan

Crawfurd was a founding member of the Workers' International Famine Relief Committee, which was started in Berlin in 1921. Fellow Committee members included Maxim Gorki,George Grosz, Anatole France, Neil McLean MP and Upton Sinclair

The "Lenin Memorial Number" of the publication "Soviet Russia Pictorial" had Crawfurd as its author.It comprised fifteen pages and contained a number of illustrations.

On Wednesday June 2nd 1925, a large number of policemen from the "Aliens Department" raided the women's conference (part of the Communist Congress) in St Mungo's Halls in Govan Street. The forty four delegates assembled there responded by singing "The Internationale". Police demands for the register being refused, each woman was then requested to speak. Crawfurd, who was presiding, responded in what the Glasgow Herald described as the "broadest Doric". The newspaper quoted Helen as saying "Camaracamchoo", "Pipe clay up the lum" and "It's a braw bricht munelicht nicht the nicht". Another (unnamed) attendee spoke to the police in Esperanto,and eleven year old Nannie Stewart, the daughter of Bob Stewart, in Russian. After ten minutes, the police withdrew to the sound of "banter, badinage and cheering". The conference continued until its scheduled conclusion

In 1927, Crawfurd was an official delegate to the Brussels International Conference against Oppressed Nationalities, at which the League against Imperialism was established. Crawfurd joined the executive of the British section.

Crawfurd stood for the CPGB in Bothwell at the 1929 general election, and Aberdeen North in 1931, but did not come close to being elected.

During the 1930s, Crawfurd was prominent in the Friends of the Soviet Union. She unsuccessfully stood for Dunoon Town Council in 1938. However, she was elected as Dunoon's first woman town councillor shortly after the war, but retired from it in 1947 due to poor health.

== Death and legacy ==
Helen Crawfurd (by then Mrs Anderson) died in 1954 at Mahson Cottage, Kilbride Avenue, Dunoon, Argyll, aged 76.

Crawfurd was included in a series of posters in 2019 and an educational resource called Scotland's Suffrage Education Pack. The education pack included a Top Trumps-style game called Scotland's Suffragettes Trumps, produced by Protests and Suffragettes (an organisation led by artists, activists and local historians) by crowdfunding to send 700 sets to schools. Women's History Scotland's Dr. Yvonne McFadden called the game "a fun and important tool to make sure these women and their stories' are included in the Scottish school curriculum, as women's history is often limited in school history teaching".

Crawfurd was memorialised in 2024 in a stained glass window by Artist Keira McLean in Glasgow's Woodside Library, working with young people from the local community. The window also features Suffragette Jessie Soga and was co-designed with young people from SiMY Community Development in Townhead. Artist McLean said "there are so many forgotten histories of people who made a real difference' to Glasgow, and that the window is "restoring the neglected histories of communities often marginalised or dismissed.” The unveiling of the window took place at an event hosted by Glasgow Life on 5 September 2024 and featured new musical arrangements by Musician Lorna Morgan of the Holloway Jingles poems written by imprisoned suffragettes. Historical information about Jessie Soga and Helen Crawfurd was shared by Clare Thompson from Protests and Suffragettes.

== Advertising the gift of a Leghorn hen ==
In June 1918, Crawfurd placed an advertisement in Forward seeking offers for a purebred Leghorn hen, which had been a gift from a supporter of the Women's Peace Crusade.

Political offices
Preceded by New position	British Secretary of Workers International Relief; 1921 – 1925	Succeeded by Jack Leckie
Party political offices
Preceded by New position	National Women's Organiser of the Communist Party of Great Britain; 1922 – 1924	Succeeded by Beth Turner
