= South Govan Women's Housing Association =

South Govan Women's Housing Association was established in 1915 under the leadership by Mary Barbour in Govan on the south side of Glasgow in Scotland.

The Glasgow Rent strikes began in response to rent increases in Glasgow during the First World War. Many thought the landlords in Glasgow were taking advantage of households whose men were away fighting as part of the war effort; thus, working-class women formed tenants associations such as the South Govan Women's Housing Association. Led by Helen Crawfurd, Mary Barbour, Agnes Dollan and Jessie Stephen, the South Govan Women's Housing Association sought to prevent evictions from tenants who could not afford the rent increase and campaigned for subsidized housing. Their efforts led to the “Rents and Mortgage Interest Restriction Bill” as well as the Housing, Town Planning, & c. Act, which saw 213,000 Government subsidized “Homes Fit For Heroes” being built soon after the war.
