= Ethel Snowden =

English socialist feminist (1881–1951)

Ethel Snowden, Viscountess Snowden
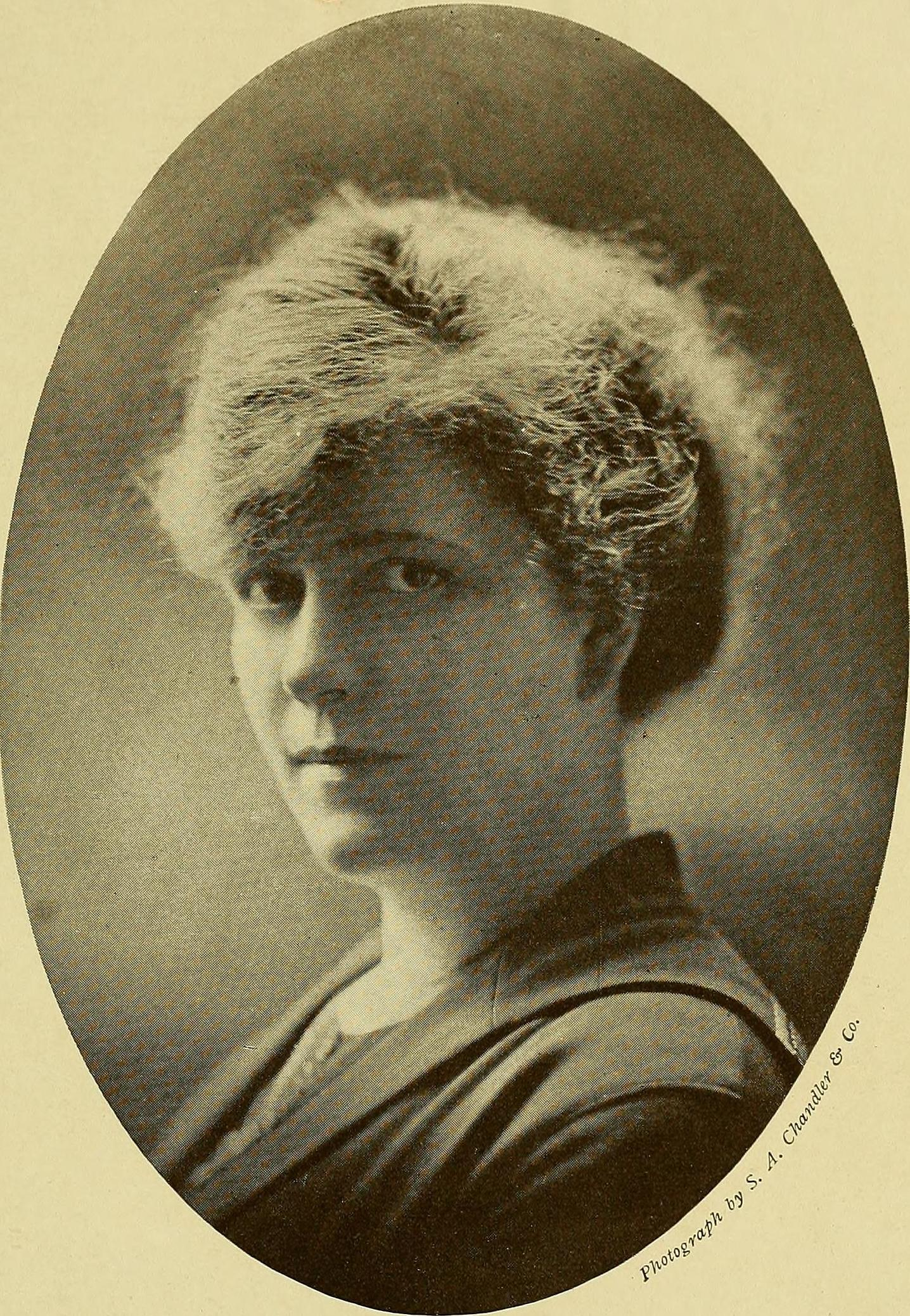
- Born: Ethel Annakin; 8 September 1881
- Died: 22 February 1951 (aged 69)
- Education: Edge Hill College
- Organization(s): Fabian Society; National Union of Women's Suffrage Societies; The Women's Peace Crusade
- Political party: Independent Labour Party
- Spouse: Philip Snowden, 1st Viscount Snowden (m. 1905, d. 1937)

Ethel Snowden, Viscountess Snowden (born Ethel Annakin; 8 September 1881 – 22 February 1951), was a British socialist, human rights activist, suffragist and feminist. From a middle-class background, she became a Christian Socialist through a radical preacher and initially promoted temperance and teetotalism in the slums of Liverpool. She aligned to the Fabian Society, National Union of Women's Suffrage Societies and later the Independent Labour Party, earning an income by lecturing in Britain and abroad. Snowden was one of the leading campaigners for women's suffrage before the First World War, then founding The Women's Peace Crusade to oppose the war and call for a negotiated peace. After a visit to the Soviet Union she developed a strong criticism of its political system, which made her unpopular when relayed to the left-wing in Britain.

Snowden married the prominent Labour Party politician and future Chancellor of the Exchequer, Philip Snowden, 1st Viscount Snowden. She rose up the social scale in the 1920s, much to her pleasure, and she welcomed appointment as a Governor of the BBC and as a Director of the Royal Opera House. Although her husband received a Viscountcy, money became tight and she led the way in caring for him; after his death in 1937, she resumed temperance campaigning as well as journalism. She tended to be a controversial public speaker, who would fill with enthusiasm for a project and pursue it to the disregard of anything that stood in her way; it was said of her that "tact or discretion were foreign to her nature".

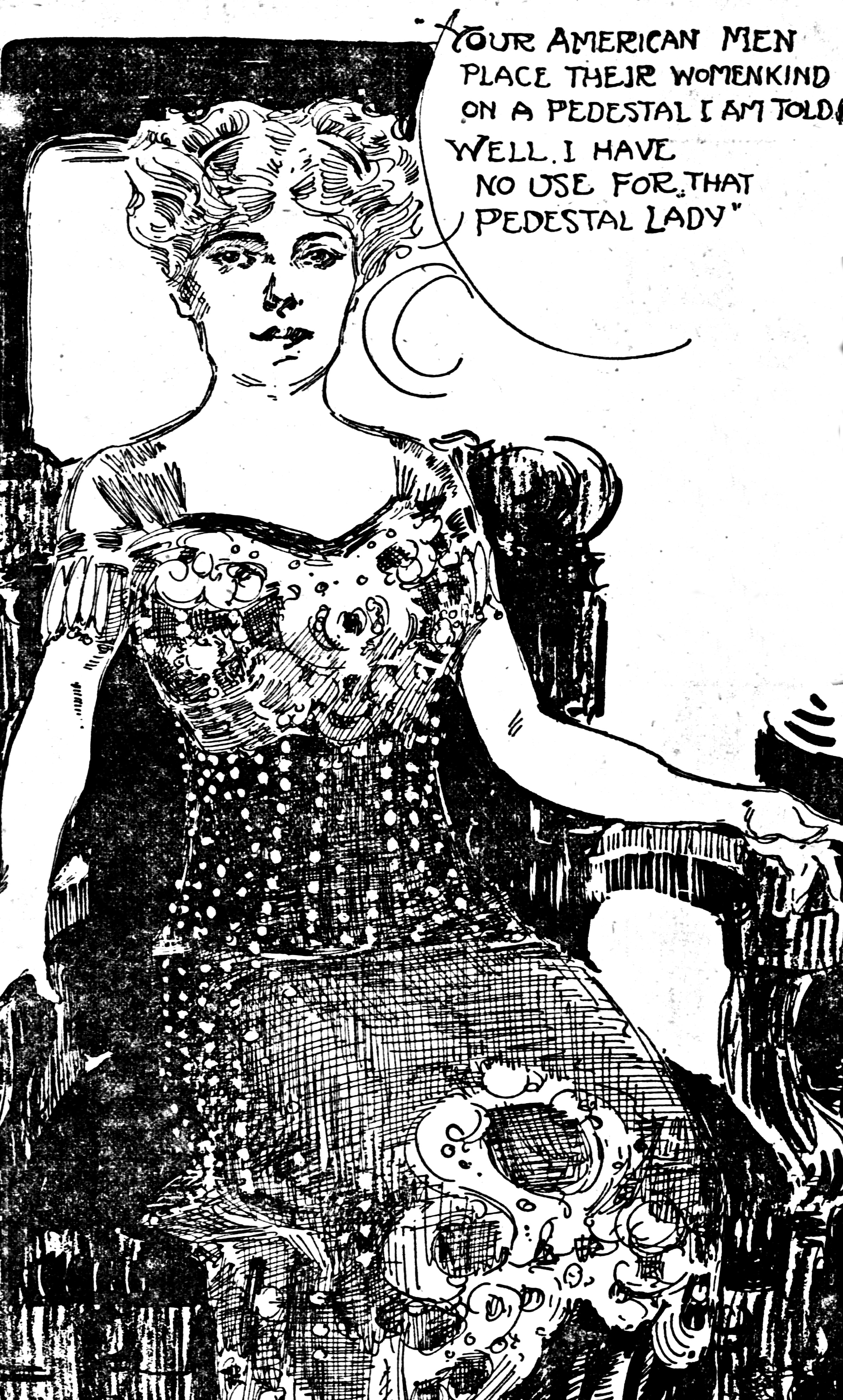
As sketched by Marguerite Martyn for the St. Louis Post-Dispatch, 1910

== Early life ==
Ethel Annakin was the daughter of Richard Annakin, a building contractor. Her father also became involved in politics and later served as an Alderman of Harrogate, becoming Mayor of the town in 1930–31. She is described by Philip Snowden's biographer Colin Cross as a "woman of strong will and striking good looks". She trained as a teacher at Edge Hill College in Liverpool, and while there joined the congregation of radical preacher Rev. Charles Frederic Aked (1864–1941); after listening to his sermon on "Can a Man be a Christian on £1 a week?" she became a socialist and joined with Aked's social work in the slums of Liverpool promoting teetotalism. She also joined the Fabian Society.

According to her future husband, the Labour politician Philip Snowden, they had met at a Fabian meeting in Leeds, probably in about 1903, although Mary Agnes Hamilton thought they met at the Bradford house of William and Martha Leach. Harrogate, a spa town not dependent on the milling industry, was regarded as a higher class area and it was rare for someone of Ethel's background to be a socialist. She took her first lecture on behalf of the Yorkshire Independent Labour Party at Keighley Labour Institute in September 1903, possibly arranged by Snowden. In 1904 she started working as a schoolteacher at Walverden School in Nelson, Lancashire which was only 9 miles from Snowden's home at Cowling, and became a regular visitor, although Philip Snowden's mother Martha could not abide to meet her, thinking her pretentious and patronising.

== Marriage ==
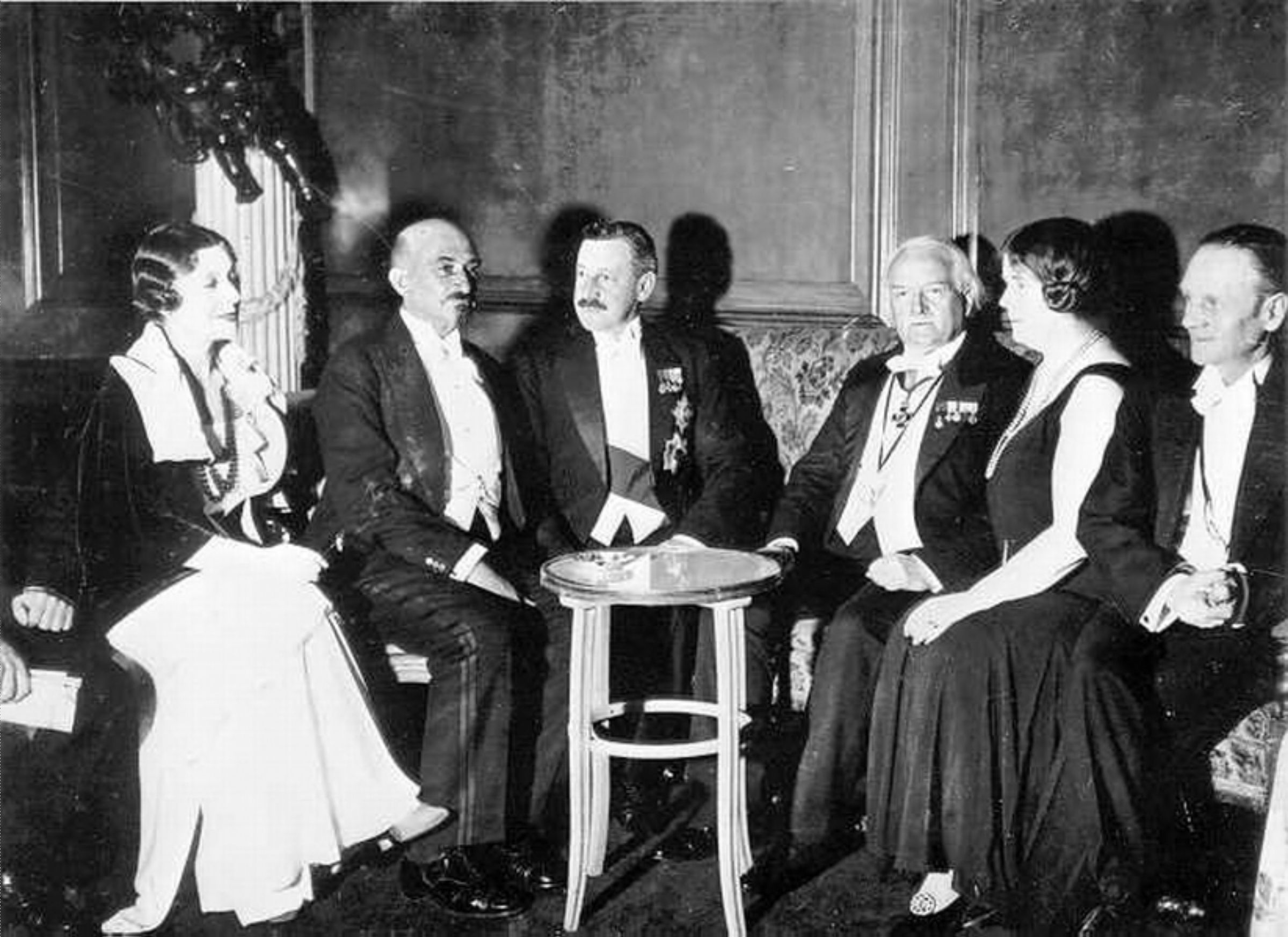
Vera Weizmann, Chaim Weizmann, Herbert Samuel, Lloyd George, Ethel Snowden, and Philip Snowden, before 1937

It was generally believed was that Ethel had proposed to Philip, which was against the marriage customs of the time. They had a quiet wedding with few guests at the registry office in Otley on 13 March 1905, with Philip Snowden explaining that they had learned that their socialist friends in the West Riding were planning a 'Socialist demonstration' at what they were hoping would be a family celebration. It is also thought that both families were opposed, and Philip Snowden did not tell his mother until he sent a telegram after the marriage had taken place. There was no honeymoon. Snowden subsequently tried to make friends with Martha but never entirely succeeded, with Martha frequently criticising her for concentrating on her own political career to the detriment of looking after her husband (who had long-term mobility difficulties).

Ethel and Philip Snowden set up home at Spencer Place in Leeds, and Ethel began to earn an income from lecture fees. She was interviewed for the woman's page of the Blackburn Weekly Telegraph where her husband was Prospective Parliamentary Candidate, telling the paper that "Our great motto .. is liberty, equality of opportunity and fraternity. Our great principle is love". She lectured in South Wales on socialism and women's suffrage in autumn 1905, but was ill during the 1906 election campaign and unable to help Philip in his successful election contest in Blackburn. She undertook a successful lecture tour of the United States in 1907, possibly arranged through Dr Aked who was then in New York; the tour was successful as American audiences seemed to like her way of speaking. The Snowdens gave up their Leeds home during this tour and moved to Baron's Court Road in West London.

== Woman's suffrage ==
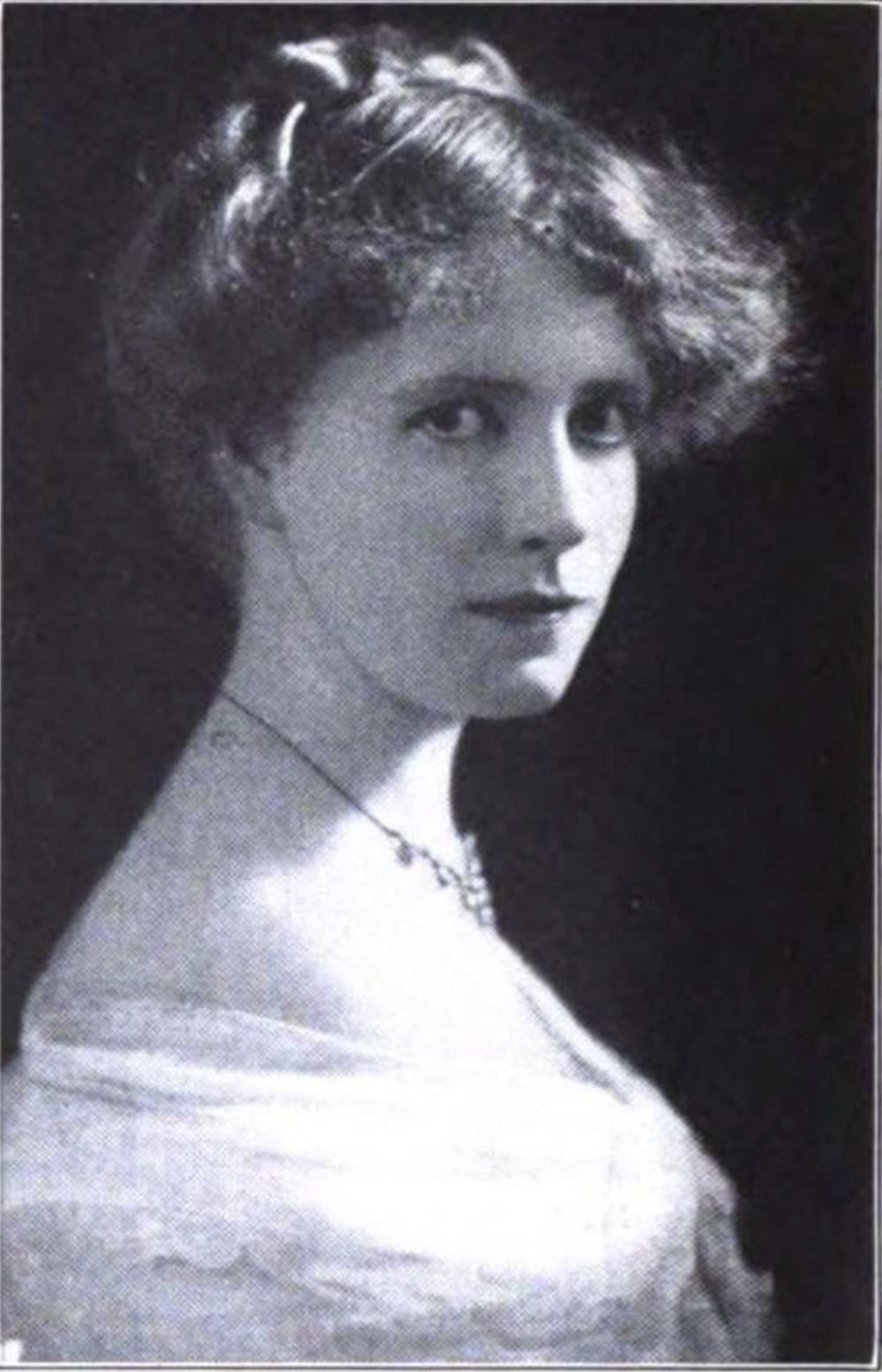
Snowden in 1912

After 1906 Snowden became increasingly active in supporting women's suffrage, being one of the national speakers for the National Union of Women's Suffrage Societies; she decried the concentration on such things as dresses, jewels and cake recipes and wrote a book called "The Woman Socialist" in 1907 which advocated state control of marriage, joint title by women to the housekeeping money, and a state salary for mothers; she also wanted housekeeping organised collectively in each street and declared that under socialism women would have "no need to paint face and tint hair". Her strong views seemed to influence her husband, although Snowden was always a "suffragist" and never endorsed the violent tactics of the suffragettes.

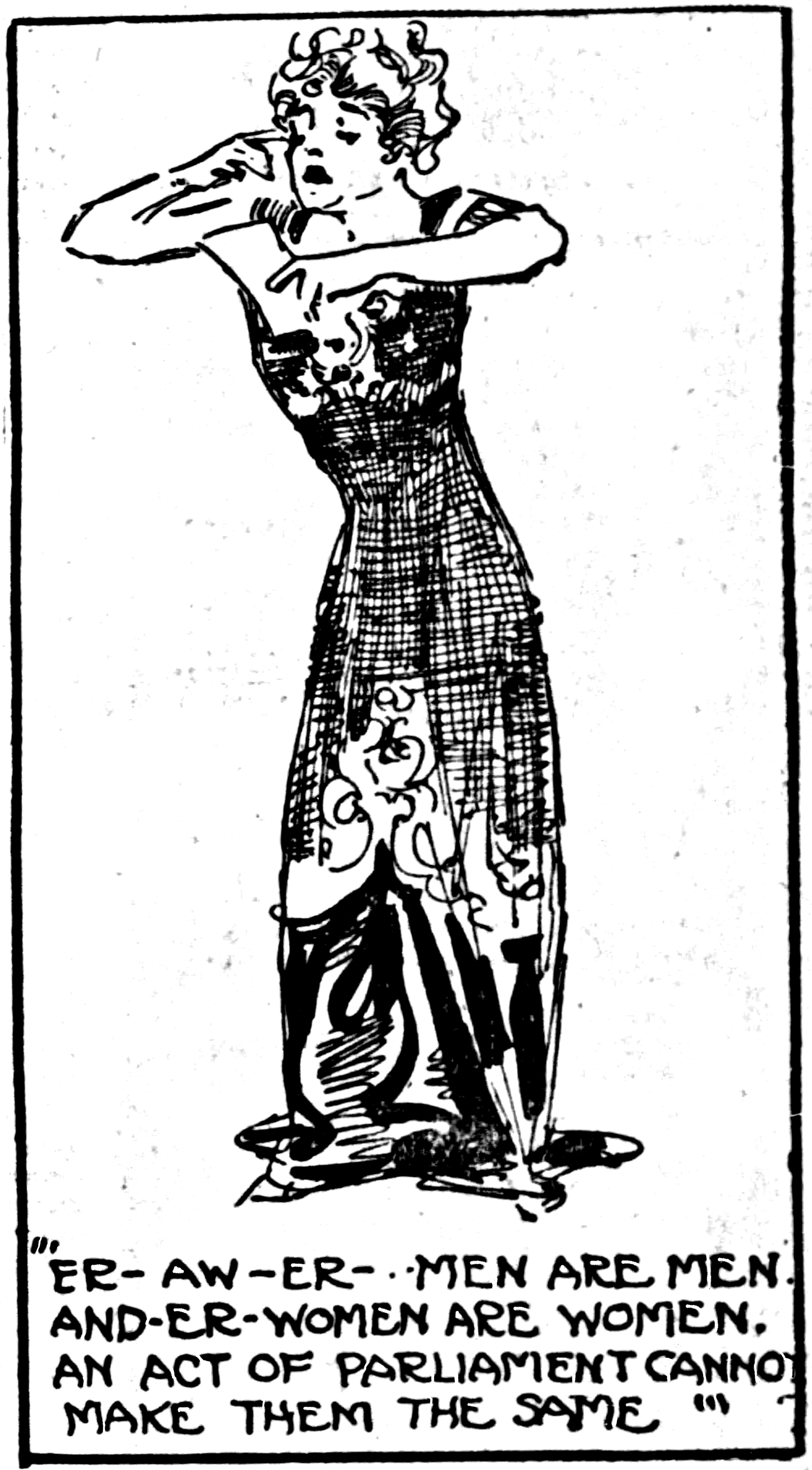
In 1910, reporter Marguerite Martyn sketched this image of Ethel Snowden mocking an anti-suffrage British parliamentarian

During a 1910 trip to the United States, Ethel Snowden was interviewed and sketched by Marguerite Martyn of the St. Louis Post-Dispatch. During the interview, Snowden mocked anti-suffrage parliamentarian Rowland Baring, 2nd Earl of Cromer, by affecting an accent and, as Martyn put it:

Standing stiffly as if suffering from a choking parliamentary collar, adjusting an imaginary monocle, producing imaginary notes from an imaginary Prince Albert coat pocket, clearing her throat and "er-ing" and "aw-ing" prodigiously, Mrs. Snowden proved herself an accomplished mimic and actress. [Adjacent image.]

In 1914 Ethel Snowden was speaking at 200 public meetings a year on the subject, and temporarily resigned from the Independent Labour Party in order that her political allegiance did not cause problems with her campaigning on the issue.

== Pacifism ==
The Snowdens left Britain for a long, world-wide, lecture tour in July 1914; while they were in Canada, news came of the outbreak of war. Philip Snowden asked whether he should return but was told not to, possibly because of his known pacifism which Ethel shared. While in Portland, Oregon, Ethel gave an interview which produced a headline reading "Briton M.P. advises British Soldiers to Shoot Their Officers" which her husband considered damaging. She was near to being a complete pacifist, and joined her husband in campaigning for a negotiated peace in 1916. Since 1915, along with other women such as Agnes Harben, after the 1915 International Alliance of Women, Snowden felt a desire to develop a British campaigning organisation, and in 1917 she became the organiser and principal speaker for the Women's Peace Crusade, and estimated that she had addressed half a million people in the last year of the war; her main campaign speech was an appeal for men to "love" one another.

In a July 1915 public speech she said "truth is the first casualty of warfare", providing an anonymous attribution. The saying was later misattributed to other notable people.

== Russia ==
At the end of the war, Snowden was elected to the National Executive Committee of the Labour Party in its Women's Section. This position made her a very prominent figure within the left-wing movements and led to a great deal of foreign travel, including to Bern and Vienna (to try to re-establish the Socialist International), Palestine, Georgia and twice to the United States. Most notably, she was named to a joint TUC–Labour Party delegation to Russia in early 1920 which was sent to be an impartial inquiry into the Bolshevik Revolution. After her return she published a book, Through Bolshevik Russia, which revealed her own findings. Although she liked Vladimir Lenin ("the merry-eyed fanatic of the Kremlin"), her general reaction was profoundly critical. She upbraided a Bolshevik who told a public meeting that a British revolution would start in three months, insisting that "we want power, but we do not want a revolution", and observed that "Everyone I met in Russia outside the Communist Party goes in terror of his liberty or his life". She had told a reporter for the Evening Standard on her return that "I oppose Bolshevism because it is not Socialism, it is not democracy and it is not Christianity", and likened working conditions to slavery.

Snowden's denunciations of the Soviets made her unpopular with the left within the Labour movement and resulted in her being voted off the National Executive Committee in 1922. Her prominence led to invitations to stand for Parliament. Snowden refused to stand in Plymouth Devonport against Lady Astor on grounds that Astor's service was invaluable. She was selected at one point as Labour Party candidate for Leicester East, but gave up the candidature when a by-election was called there in Spring 1922 (the Labour candidate won).

== Social rise ==
With Philip Snowden back in Parliament for Colne Valley in 1922 and Labour as the official opposition, Lord and Lady Astor arranged a dinner party where King George V and Queen Mary could meet Labour leaders Snowden, J. R. Clynes, James Henry Thomas and their wives. Snowden became firm friends with Queen Mary. The couple put together all their earnings and savings in 1923 to buy a country house of ten rooms, Eden Lodge, set in an acre of land at Tilford in Surrey. Above her mantelpiece in the drawing room at Eden Lodge were later placed signed photographs of the King and Queen. They sold their London home at Golders Green and took a flat near Parliament in St Ermine's Court, but Ethel was angry when her husband was not allocated the living quarters at 11 Downing Street on becoming Chancellor of the Exchequer in 1924. (Note: Clynes, who was Lord Privy Seal and responsible for conducting government business in the House of Commons, lived at 11 Downing Street during the first Labour government.)The Snowdens did not generally host parties, partly because they were both hard workers, but did like to meet up with old friends. They enjoyed music and Ethel was a good pianist. She started a rivalry with Beatrice Webb for the position of the leader among the Labour ministers' wives. After the fall of the Labour government, Ethel Snowden toured Canada and criticised Ramsay MacDonald's leadership in public speeches which were widely reported back in Britain and assumed to be the views of her husband. Although later moderating her language, she stood by her words when questioned by reporters on her return.

Conservative Prime Minister Stanley Baldwin appointed Ethel Snowden a governor of the newly established British Broadcasting Corporation in 1926, as a representative of women and of Labour; the appointment carried an annual salary of £750. She quarrelled with Sir John Reith at her first meeting and they continued to feud throughout her term, with Reith trying to get rid of her. Snowden was given the credit for the fact that no alcoholic drinks could be found in the newly built Broadcasting House, and she appeared to confirm her responsibility for this state of affairs. When the Labour government was formed in 1929, the Snowdens finally moved to 11 Downing Street, where they found that the cost of employing eight servants and official entertaining required dipping into their savings. While no alcoholic drink was served, Ethel hosted many tea parties and evening receptions with musical and artistic guests (some in the Labour Party noted that few MPs or even other Ministers had been invited). She seems to have persuaded her husband to give an Exchequer grant to support the Royal Opera House at Covent Garden, and became a director of the new company formed to manage it.

== Viscountess ==
Philip Snowden was seriously ill in early 1931, and apparently decided not to stand again for Parliament but to go to the House of Lords. He confirmed his decision to stand down in August, shortly before the collapse of the Labour Government, and was not a candidate in the general election although playing an active part in the campaign. When the award of a Viscountcy was announced in the Dissolution Honours List, Ramsay MacDonald was reported to have said that Snowden's desire for a Peerage came from his wife. Ethel became Viscountess Snowden on 24 November 1931.

The Snowdens found their financial position gradually eroding after 1931. Ethel's five-year appointment at the BBC expired at the end of 1931 and was renewed for only one year, but after Philip Snowden resigned from office over the principle of free trade that was their only regular income. When the appointment came up again, MacDonald did not renew it, a move was ascribed to personal spite. The Snowdens had to fund Eden Lodge, a London flat, and the costs of caring for Philip, who now needed constant medical attention. Philip Snowden turned back to journalism, penning increasingly bitter attacks on MacDonald. By 1936 he was immobile and being cared for by Ethel and some nurses whom she supervised at Eden Lodge; he continued to keep up with politics. Ethel attended the Coronation ceremonies of 12 May 1937 without him; Philip died three days later. She had him cremated at Woking, and the ashes scattered on the open moor at Ickornshaw above his birthplace; his books were given to Keighley Public Libraries where they formed the 'Viscount Snowden Memorial Library'. She destroyed his remaining papers.

== Later life ==
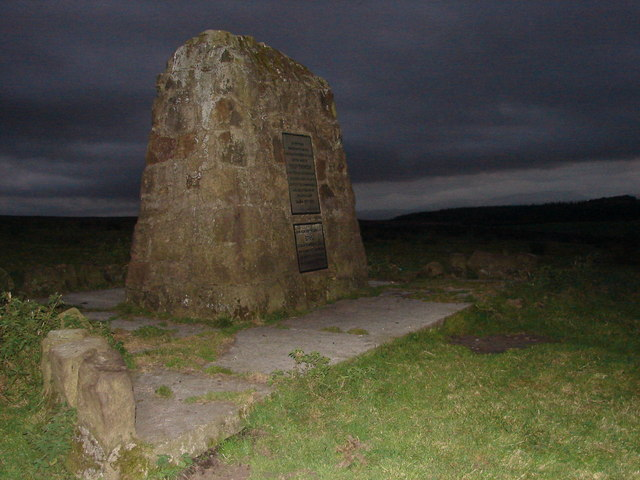
Snowden's Cairn. The plaques read: "In this place mingled with the soil and near the friends he loved are the ashes of Philip Snowden First Viscount of Ickornshaw who lived his whole life in the service of the common people and died in the love of his native land on May 15th 1937." Below that: Here also are the ashes of Ethel his beloved and devoted wife who shared his labours for so many years and died on February 22nd 1951"

Viscountess Snowden moved to a flat in Dolphin Square, disliking visiting Eden Lodge which was used by an evacuated Government office during World War II. She attempted unsuccessfully to get reappointed as a BBC governor and in 1937 visited the Nuremberg Rally, writing for the Sunday Chronicle to criticise other British people present for refusing to give the salute and to say that she found Adolf Hitler "a simple man of great personal integrity" of whom "I would not hesitate to accept his word". Her other journalism made a strong defence of her husband; it was said that the quickest way to win her favour was to praise Philip. She entertained Queen Mary to tea at Dolphin Square in 1938, and became President of the Band of Hope, the leading Christian temperance organisation, in May 1939. When war did break out, she supported it and expressed the view that Nazis were utterly evil, but she had reservations about area bombing. In August 1943 she denounced the BBC for poor moral standards in regard to drinking, swearing, and marital fidelity; she was nevertheless invited to appear as a panellist on The Brains Trust.

Snowden suffered a severe stroke in 1947 which left her disabled and permanently resident in the Warleigh Nursing Home in Wimbledon, although her mind remained active. She sent a letter of support to Conservative Party candidate Cyril Black, a teetotaller, in Wimbledon at the 1950 general election. Her father died that year at the age of 93, and she outlived him by only a few months, dying aged 69. Her will was worth £23,279, the majority being the money she had earned in her early career. After cremation her ashes were scattered on the same moor as her husband. Her collection of books joined those of her husband at Keighley Library.

There is a Halls of Residence called Snowden at Edge Hill University in her honour.

== Books and pamphlets ==
=== Books ===
- The Woman Socialist, 1907
- The Feminist Movement, 1913
- Through Bolshevik Russia, 1920
- A Political Pilgrim in Europe, 1920

=== Pamphlets ===
- Women:A Few Shrieks, 1907
- Women and the State, 1907
- British Standards of Child Welfare, 1926
- Welfare as Tested by ’The Declaration of Geneva’, 1926
