= Agnes Harben =

British suffragist

- Born: Agnes Helen Bostock; 15 September 1879; Horsham, West Sussex, England
- Died: 29 October 1961 (aged 82); Jersey
- Organization: United Suffragists
- Known for: suffragist leadership and international delegate for women Fabian Society
- Spouse: Henry Devenish Harben (m. 1899)
- Children: 4, including Henry Eric Southey Harben

Agnes Helen Harben (née Bostock; 15 September 1879 – 29 October 1961) was a British suffragist leader who also supported the militant suffragette hunger strikers, and was a founder of the United Suffragists.

== Family ==
Harben was born on 15 September 1879, at 7 North Street, Horsham, Sussex, to Edward Ingram Bostock, J.P. (1842–1946) who later became chairman of the Horsham Urban District Council and Sarah Southey Bostock née Baker (1845-1920), and she was the fifth of eleven siblings:

- Eva May Bostock (b.1875),
- John Southey Bostock (1875–1930) MBE served in the Army Medical Corps.
- Archibald Thomas Bostock (1877–1915) who fought in the Boer War, and World War One and died after the Battle of Loos.
- Robert Vernon Bostock (1878–1949) who was wounded serving in Palestine but emigrated to Australia after WWI.
- Agnes Helen Bostock (1879–1920)
- Alpen Bostock (b.1880).
- Constance Marjorie Bostock (1881–1967).
- Francis Edward Henry Bostock (1883–1955) who was wounded and awarded the Military Cross, emigrated to South Africa and wrote a book "The Chronicles of Capota 1927–1943", subtitled "The Travels in Africa of Major Francis E H Bostock, MC ".
- Dorothy Bostock (1884–1964) was a war nurse.
- Edward Lyon Bostock (1886–1917) died at the Somme.
- Neville Stanley Bostock (1888–1917) was in the Canadian Mounted Police, then served in the Royal Field Artillery, killed in World War One near Arras.

Agnes Bostock married Henry Devenish Harben (of Warnham Lodge) on 2 September 1899 at St. Mary's Church, and later moved to Newland Park, Chalfont St. Peter (her husband inherited in 1910). The Harbens had four children: Major Henry Eric Southey Harben (1900–1971) and County cricketer for Sussex; Edward (born 1901); Agnes Mary (born 1903) and Naomi (1907–1996).

== Political activism ==
Harben was a member of the Fabian society, a socialist and internationalist debating society, which influenced the formation of the Labour movement.

Harben and her husband supported the women's right to vote and moved in senior political and intellectual circles, for example dining on 6 February 1912 with Baron Cecil Harmsworth, a Liberal MP, and entertained other political activists and writers e.g. Emmeline Pankhurst, George Bernard Shaw, Sidney and Beatrice Webb and H. G. Wells. Harben's husband was close to the Pankhursts and provided funding to the WSPU and the National Union of Women's Suffrage Societies. Although Harben herself was not imprisoned for militant action, she gave practical support, rather than denounce those women who did so, and raised money e.g. by an 'American Fair'. The Harbens provided a home for Annie Kenney after one of her imprisonments, supported Rachel Barrett and many other suffragettes, released from prison to aid recovery from hunger strike and force-feeding. Harben's husband left the Liberal Party as a result of the policy and lack of action about this cruel treatment.

In autumn 1914, the Harbens' support for women released to recover before being re-arrested (under the 'Cat and Mouse Act' ) suddenly brought the 'county set' in contact with 'criminals' as philosopher C.E.M. Joad remarked:

"Suffragettes, let out of prison under the Cat and Mouse Act, used to go to Newlands to recuperate, before returning to prison for a fresh bout of torture. When the county called, as the county still did, it was embarrassed to find haggard-looking young women in dressing-gowns and djibbahs reclining on sofas in the Newlands drawing-room talking unashamedly about their prison experiences. This social clash of county and criminals at Newlands was an early example of the mixing of different social strata which the war was soon to make a familiar event in national life. At that time it was considered startling enough, and it required all the tact of Harben and his socially very competent wife to oil the wheels of tea-table intercourse, and to fill the embarrassed pauses which punctuated any attempt at conversation."

== United Suffragists and international leagues ==
In 1913, Agnes and her husband were delegates to the 7th Women's International League in Budapest, Hungary, with Harben representing the Fabians, and in autumn 1915, to an international women's conference in Amsterdam, Netherlands to discuss peace, contrary to Millicent Fawcett and the NUWSS's position.

On 13 February 1914, Harben became one of the founder committee members of the United Suffragists which brought together militant and non-militant women and included men, like her husband, along with Louisa Garrett Anderson, H. J. Gillespie, Gerald Gould, Bessie Lansbury and George Lansbury, Mary Neal, Emmeline Pethick-Lawrence, Julia Scurr and John Scurr, Evelyn Sharp, and Edith Ayrton; Louise Eates and Lena Ashwell also became members in 1914, and the organisation grew rapidly, and it took over the publishing of the weekly Votes for Women from the militant WSPU. United Suffragists established active groups in Amersham, Stroud, Edinburgh and in by-election campaigns in Poplar and Bethnal Green.

United Suffragist colours were purple, white and orange used in banners for suffrage events and processions, but their activity extended to clubs for working women in Southwark and grew across the country as they took members from WPSU and NUWSS e.g. in Birmingham and Portsmouth. On the achievement of (some) women's right to vote, via the Representation of the People Act 1918, the United Suffragists held major celebration events with NUWSS on 13 March 1918, and their own event on16 March 1918, presenting their Votes for Women editor, Evelyn Sharp with a book signed by the members (Note: it is not known, but highly likely that Harben signed it).

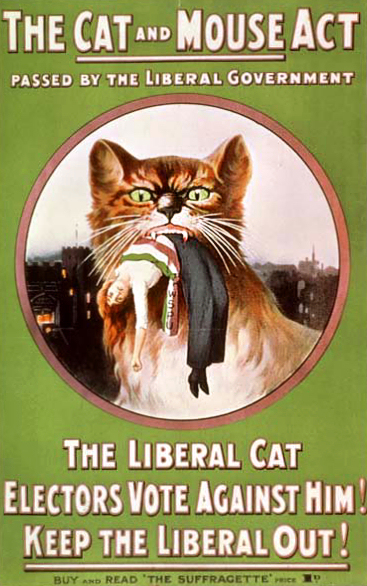
Cat and Mouse Act poster 1914

In 1915, Harben attending the International Women's Suffrage Alliance helped to establish the Women's International League of Great Britain with Sylvia Pankhurst, Mary Sheepshanks, Charlotte Despard, Helen Crawfurd, Mary Barbour, Agnes Dollan, Ethel Snowden, Ellen Wilkinson, Margery Corbett-Ashby, Selina Cooper, Helena Swanwick, Olive Schreiner.

Harben later joined the League of Rights for Soldiers and Sailors Wives and Relatives with others including George and Bessie Lansbury.

== Death ==
Harben died on 29 October 1961, in the Jersey parish of St. Saviour.
