= Mary Barbour =

Scottish activist and councillor (1875–1958)

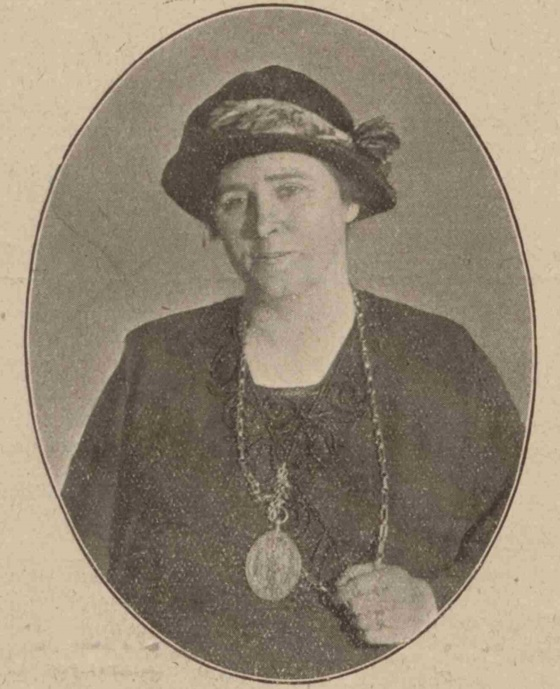
- Born: Mary Rough; 20 February 1875; Kilbarchan, Scotland
- Died: 2 April 1958 (aged 83); Southern General Hospital, Glasgow, Scotland
- Occupations: Political activist, local councillor, bailie, magistrate
- Known for: Glasgow rent strikes, Women's Peace Crusade
- Spouse: David Barbour (m. 1896–1957)
- Children: David (1897–1897); James; William

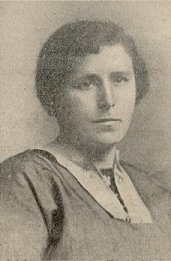
Mary Barbour

Mary Barbour (née Rough; 20 February 1875 – 2 April 1958) was a Scottish political activist, local councillor, bailie and magistrate. Barbour was closely associated with the Red Clydeside movement in the early 20th century and especially for her role as the main organiser of the women of Govan who took part in the rent strikes of 1915. The protesters became known as "Mrs Barbour's Army". She was also a founder of the Women's Peace Crusade. She stood as a Labour candidate and was elected to Glasgow Town Council in 1920, representing the Fairfield ward in Govan. She was one of the first female councillors in the city. She was also one of the first female bailies of Glasgow Corporation. She advocated for the provision of women's and children's health and welfare services.

On her 74th birthday, there was a special tribute to Barbour on the front page of The Govan Press newspaper. Recognition of the impact of her activism is still evident in Govan and across Glasgow today. There is a statue of her at Govan Cross. Murals depicting her with Isabella Elder, and reimagining her as a modern day campaigner have been commissioned in Govan. She is also included in the Clutha Bar mural.

She is remembered in popular culture, in the song Mrs Barbour's Army by Alistair Hulett and the play Mrs Barbour's Daughters by A.J. Taudevin. Barbour was the subject of one of the Not Forgotten series of documentaries on Channel Four in 2007. In 2012 Woman's Hour ran a profile about Barbour following the writing of a poem about her by Christine Finn for an exhibition at the National Museum of Scotland.

Barbour is described as a "Trailblazer" by the tour company Gallus Pedals, which organises bicycle tours in Glasgow. The company state on their website that ten women inspired the individual names of the bikes, and include a biography of each in several different categories. The category "Women who Shaped Glasgow's Social Change" includes not only Barbour but also Jessie Stephen and Rachel Hamilton.

== Life ==
Barbour was born on 20 February 1875 at 37 New Street, Kilbarchan to Jean (Gavin) and James Rough, a handloom carpet weaver. She was the third of seven children. Barbour attended school until she was fourteen years old. In 1887, the family moved to the village of Elderslie and Barbour worked as a thread twister, eventually becoming a carpet printer. On 28 August 1896, Mary Rough married an engineer, David Barbour (2 May 1873 – 13 November 1957), at Wallace Place, Elderslie. By the 1901 census, the couple had settled in Govan at 5 Macleod Street, where they lived with their son, James. Their son David died in infancy in 1897. By the 1911 census, the family, including another son, William, had moved to 43 Ure Street (now Uist Street).

In 1933, Barbour moved to a council house at 34 Cromdale Street in Drumoyne, Glasgow, where she lived until her death. One year after she was widowed, Barbour died at age 83 in the Southern General Hospital, Glasgow. Her funeral was held at Craigton Crematorium in Cardonald, near Govan.

== Political activism ==
Barbour first became politically active as a member of the Kinning Park Co-operative Guild. Barbour's political activism began in earnest in leading the South Govan Women's Housing Association during the Glasgow rent strikes of 1915, when she actively organised tenant committees and eviction resistance. The protestors became known as "Mrs Barbour's Army", and included Agnes Dollan, Helen Crawfurd, Mary Burns Laird, and Mary Jeff.

=== Women's Peace Crusade ===
Barbour was a founder of the Women's Peace Crusade (WPC) at the "Great Women's Peace Conference" in June 1916, with Helen Crawfurd and Agnes Dollan. These women also worked with Agnes Harben and others across Britain.

The WPC campaigned throughout June and July 1916 for a negotiated settlement to World War I. Barbour and the others organised this predominately through open air meetings in Glasgow, Clydeside and Edinburgh. The possibility of a negotiated peace settlement became less likely with the formation of a new coalition government in December 1916, led by Lloyd George.

Both the Russian Revolution and the Irish Easter Rising provided a catalyst for renewed peace activism in Scotland, including the work of the WPC. The 1917 annual May Day celebration in Glasgow Green brought together 70,000 people. Women peace activists, including Barbour, Dollan and Mary Burns Laird, were prominent among the speakers. This type of activity inspired the re-launch of the Women's Peace Crusade in July 1917, on Glasgow Green with 10,000 people taking part. Other branches of the WPC were then established throughout Scotland, England and South Wales. Their campaign continued until the end of World War I.

=== Political career ===
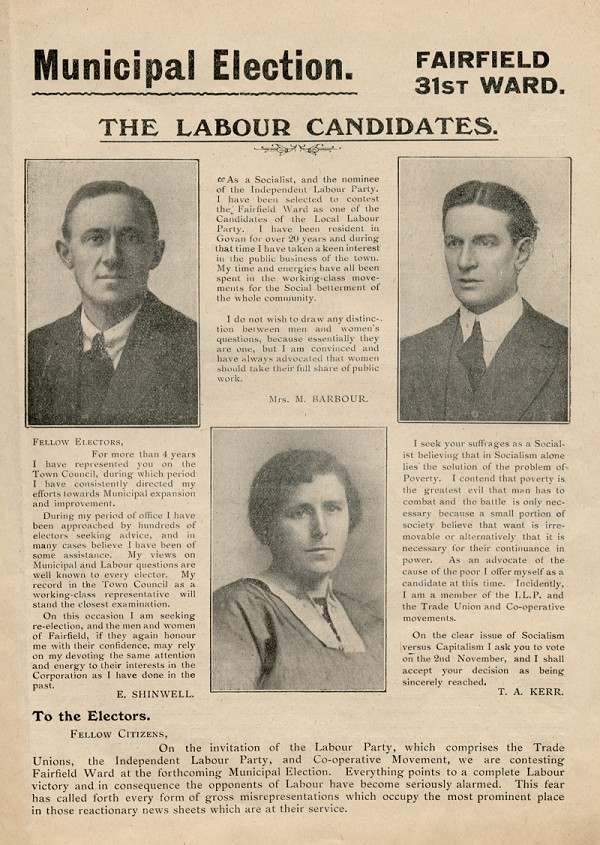
Govan Fairfield election address

In 1920, Barbour stood as the Labour candidate for Fairfield ward in Govan, and was elected to Glasgow Town Council, becoming one of the city's first woman councillors. While Barbour has often been credited as being 'the first Labour woman councillor in Glasgow', this is not the case. Barbour was one of a pioneering group of five women who were elected in 1920 which included Eleanor Stewart (Maryhill) as the other Labour woman councillor, and Jessica Baird-Smith, Mary Bell and Mary Anderson Snodgrass all respectively elected as Moderate councillors. It would appear that the misconception about Barbour being the "first Labour woman councillor" originated in Patrick Dollan's book about the Kinning Park Co-operative Society, published in 1923. While standing for election, Barbour stated that "the advent of a woman candidate was seen by some men and women as outrageous", but contended that women councillors were needed to tackle issues that affected women and children.

From 1924–27 Barbour served as one of Glasgow Corporation's first woman baillies, alongside Mary Bell. Barbour was appointed as one of the first woman magistrates in Glasgow. Barbour became a Justice of the Peace for the City of Glasgow in January 1928.

=== Role in provision of health and welfare services ===
From 1925, Barbour was Chair of the Glasgow Women's Welfare and Advisory Clinic, and had worked with the Glasgow Corporation's specialist in child and female healthcare, Dr Nora Wattie, to establish the clinic, staffed by female nurses and doctors. Barbour gave a speech at the opening of the clinic in August 1926, in a storefront at 51 Govan Road, which was the first site offering advice on birth control in Scotland. The clinic subsequently moved to 123 Montrose Street, Glasgow during 1932.

In November 1926, Barbour attended the opening of the West Govan Child Welfare Clinic. This building, at 20 Arklet Street, Govan, remains in use by NHS Greater Glasgow and Clyde as Elderpark Clinic.

During her tenure as a councillor and Bailie, Barbour worked relentlessly on behalf of the working class people of her constituency, serving on numerous committees covering the provision of health and welfare services, and even after her retirement in 1931, Barbour remained involved in this area.

== Influence and recognition ==
=== Mary Barbour in popular culture ===
Mary Barbour is name-checked in Scottish Women's Power Anthem 'Girl (Daughter of Scotland)' by Sharon Martin.

Chris Hannan's play Elizabeth Gordon Quinn was first performed at the Traverse Theatre, Edinburgh on 29 June 1985. It was directed by Steven Unwin. The play is set during the rent strike in Glasgow, 1915. Although Barbour does not feature as a character, the play reproduces a famous Barbour incident from the rent strike. The most important thing in the Quinn household is the piano. In Part One Scene Two, the piano is sequestrated by sheriff officers in lieu of owed rent. The Quinns, at this point, are not rent-strikers but are instead simply unable to pay their rent because of their poverty. In Part One, Scene Four William Quinn (Elizabeth's husband) narrates how he, aided by fifty women rent-strikers, and with the assistance of shipyard workers simply walked into the factor's office and asked for it to be returned.

The factor was afraid of us

— William Quinn, Part 1 Scene 4

Helen Crawfurd in her unpublished memoir recounts how during the rent-strike factors would try to collect the rental increases by resorting to the blackmail of social humiliation. The ploy was to dupe individual household tenants into believing that everyone else in the close had paid up. Upon one of these occasions Barbour drafted in men from Govan's shipyards, led them to the factor's office and demanded the amount of the increase be returned. 'Faced with thousands of black-faced workers the factor handed over the money' Crawfurd recalls.

The song Mrs Barbour's Army by Alistair Hulett is about Mary Barbour's organisation of the 1915 rent strike. A song was also written about Mary Barbour by Glasgow singer/songwriter Lainey Dempsey.

Barbour was the subject of one of the Not Forgotten series of documentaries on Channel Four in 2007. In 2012 the BBC Radio 4 programme Woman's Hour ran a profile about Mary Barbour following the writing of a poem about her by Christine Finn for an exhibition at the National Museum of Scotland. The poem was called Mary Barbour's Rattle and can be viewed on the Museum's website.

Mrs Barbour's Daughters is a play by A.J. Taudevin. It was first produced in October 2014 in Oran Mor, Glasgow in association with the Traverse Theatre. The play is set in a tenement flat in Govan where the lead character's memories come back to life in a series of flashbacks. The play is divided into eleven sections, and although Mrs Barbour is a recurring presence in the play, she only appears as a character in the penultimate section where she makes a speech set during the period of the rent strike. A review in The List concluded that "Mrs Barbour's Daughters is a concise and moving sketch of the feminist tradition and makes its point using sweet harmony, not rabble rousing."

The original cast included; Mary-Anna Hepburn played Grace, Gail Watson played Joan and Libby McArthur Mrs Barbour. The director was Emma Callander assisted by Andy McNamee.

Mary Barbour was also the inspiration behind the character of Agnes Calder in J David Simons' novel The Liberation of Celia Kahn (Five Leaves 2011, re-printed Saraband 2014). Also featured in the novel are the Glasgow women's involvement in the Rent Strikes and the events leading up to the foundation of the first birth control clinic in Govan, Glasgow.

Special tribute in "The Govan Press" newspaper

In honour of Mary Barbour's 74th birthday, the local newspaper devoted much of its front page to a birthday celebration held in her honour in the Engineers' Hall, Govan. The article recounted her activism, with many of her former associates in attendance. The "bumper birthday party" as the newspaper styled it, was organised by the South Govan Women's Housing Association, of which Barbour was the founder and Honorary President. Bailie Jack Davis from the City Council not only highlighted Barbour's personal achievements, but told his audience how much she had inspired other women by her leadership.

=== Memorials ===
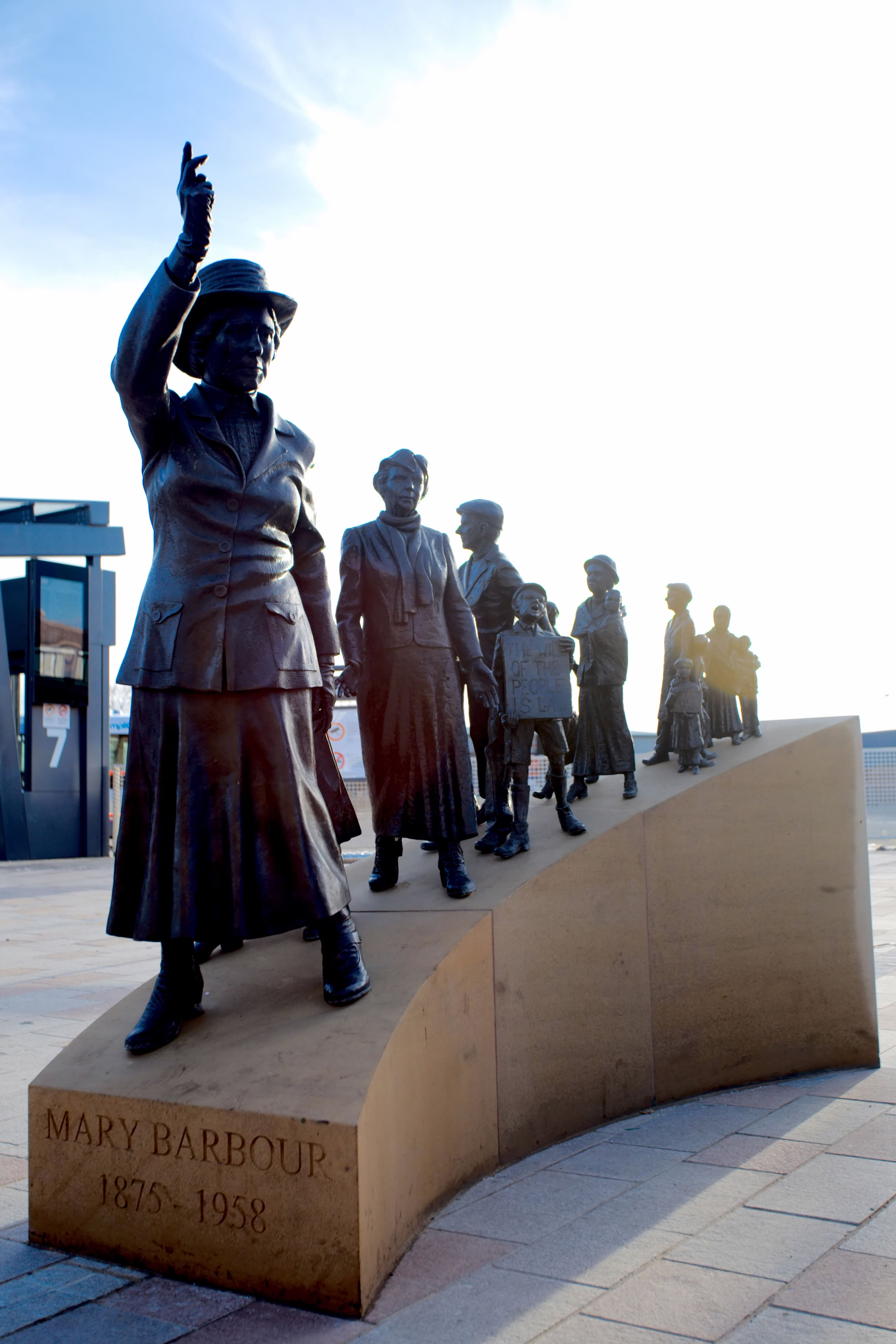
Statue to commemorate Mary Barbour, Govan Cross, Glasgow. View from the front.

In 2011, Glasgow Women's Library commissioned 21 artworks as part of their 21st anniversary celebrations. Glasgow-based artist Sharon Thomas chose to depict a hypothetical monument to Barbour in Govan. The work generated interest in a real statue of Barbour, which in 2013 led to the creation of the Remember Mary Barbour Association (RMBA), who campaigned for a statue. The campaign garnered support from Glasgow City Council, Nicola Sturgeon, the Scottish Parliament and Sir Alex Ferguson. In September 2015 five sculptors were shortlisted to produce a maquette to convey their vision of a fitting statue. Public showings of the set of five maquettes were scheduled to take place from November 2015 through February 2016, at various locations commencing at the Pearce Institute in Govan. Sculptor Andrew Brown was selected to sculpt the statue in February 2016.

Although having secured about £56,000 through public donations, approximately half of the funding needed to build the statue, the RMBA's application to Creative Scotland was rejected in November 2015 based on an apparent lack of community engagement. In order to meet the shortfall and raise the money to complete the project, the RMBA planned several events including a gala concert to be held in the Old Fruitmarket in Glasgow. The statue was completed in 2017 and unveiled in March 2018.

A mural of Mary Barbour and Isabella Elder was installed at Crossloan Road, Glasgow in 2023. It was commissioned by Yardworks and created by Protests and Suffragettes.

A mural by street artist Jeks reimagining Mary Barbour as a modern-day campaigner was commissioned by the Linthouse Housing Association and was painted on a gable end in Govan Road, Glasgow in 2025.

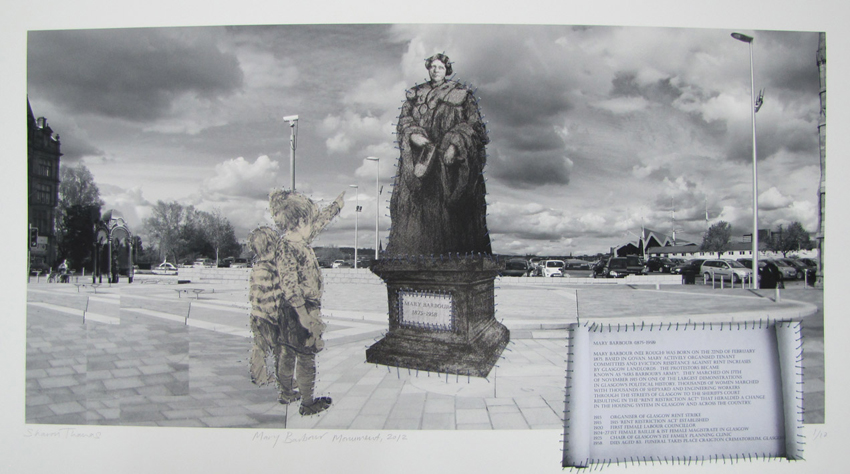
Etching of hypothetical Mary Barbour monument in Govan, Glasgow, by artist Sharon Thomas

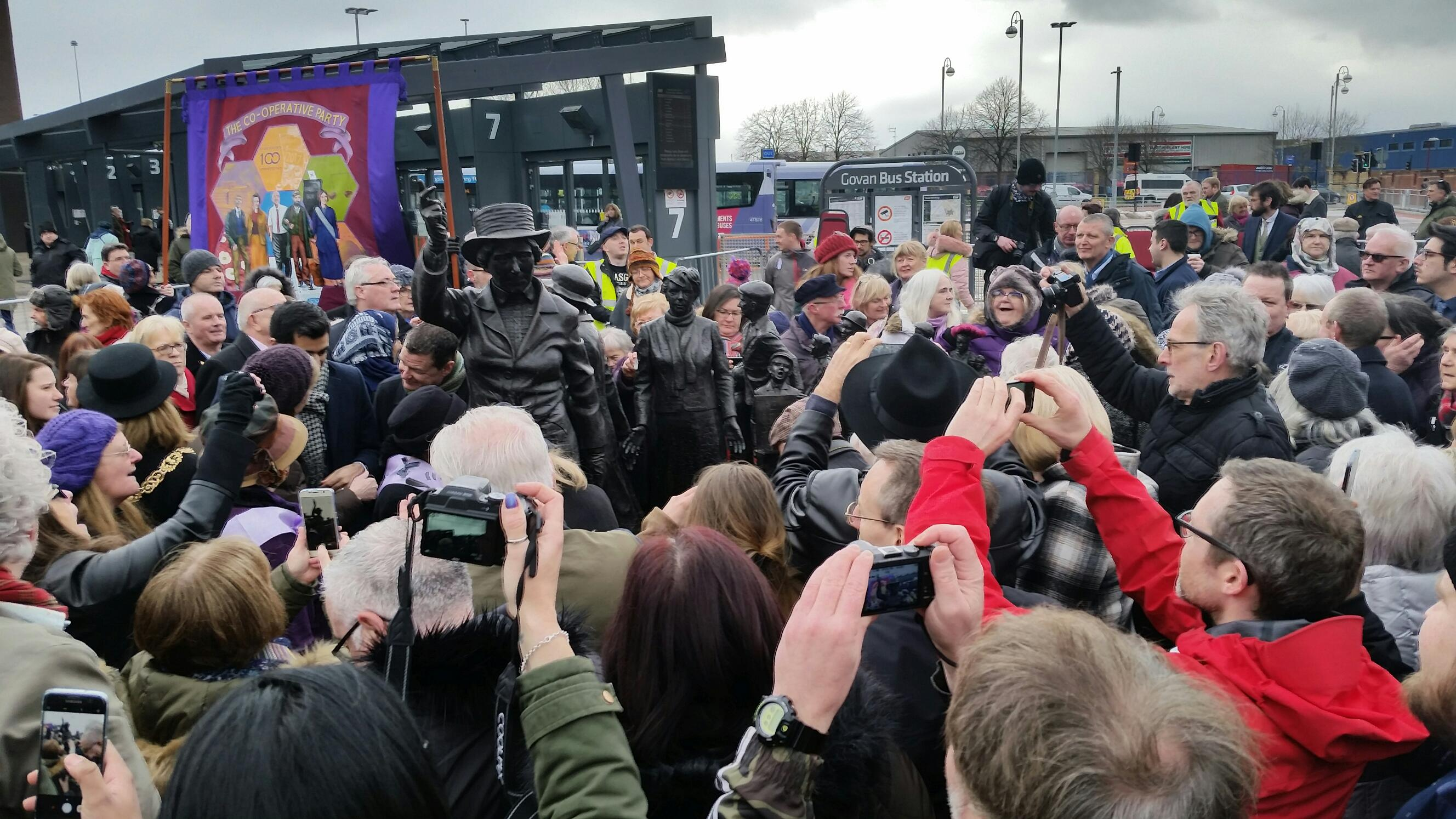
Crowds gather for the unveiling of the statue of Mary Barbour at Govan Cross, Glasgow.

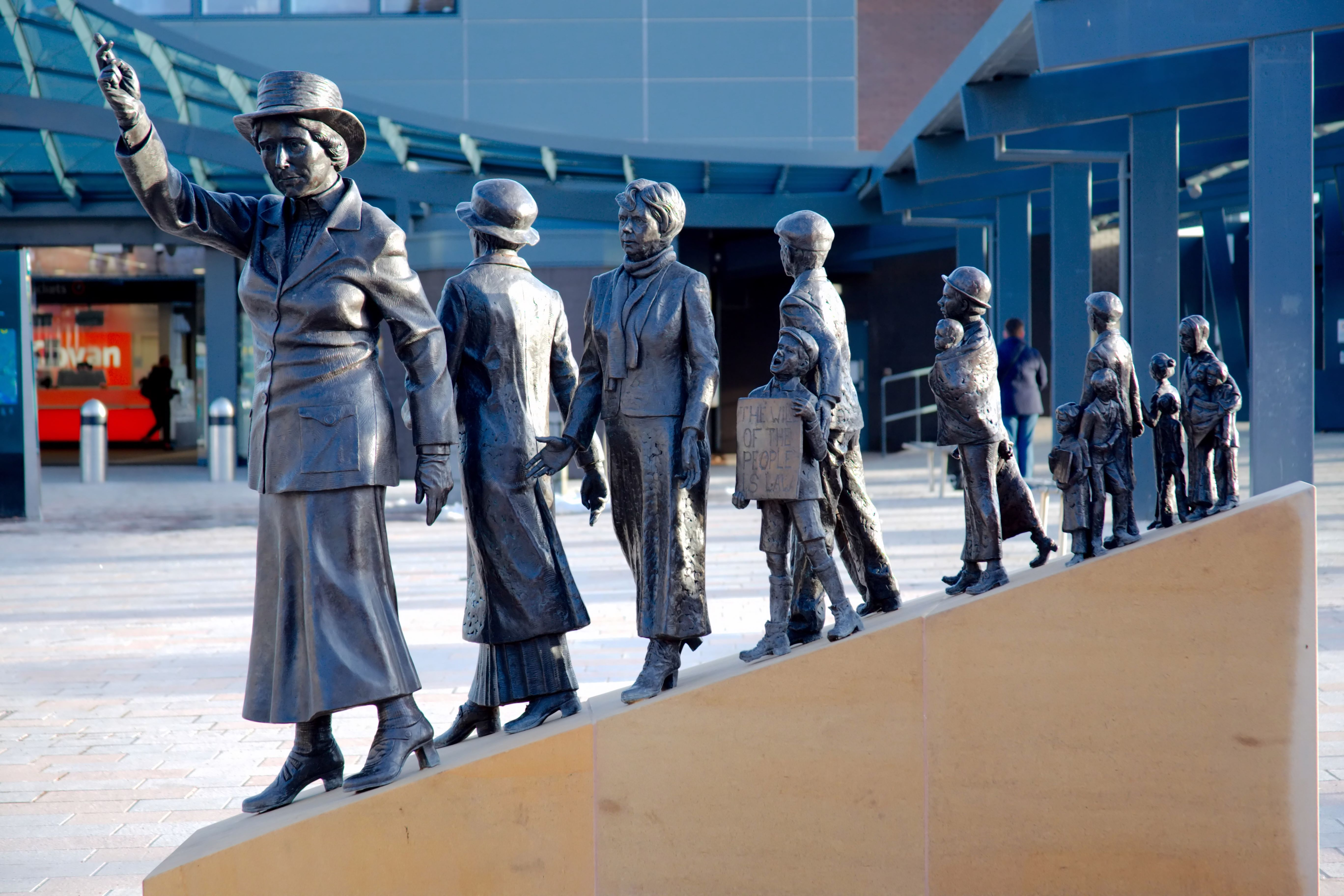
Statue to commemorate Mary Barbour, Govan Cross, Glasgow.View from the side.

=== The Kilbarchan Cairn ===
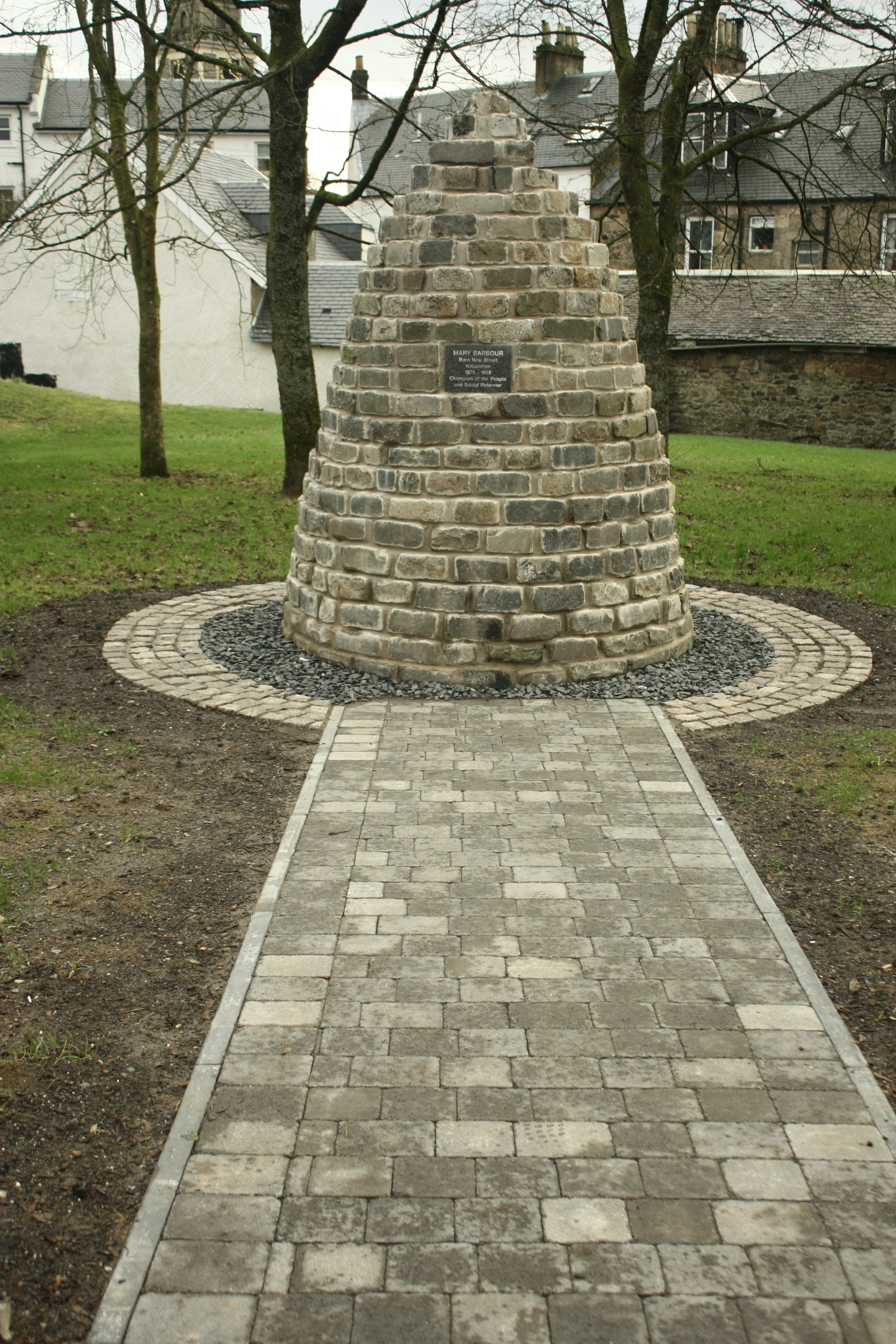
Mary Barbour Cairn

In May 2015, Renfrewshire Council agreed to fund a commemorative cairn in Barbour's home village of Kilbarchan. The Council estimated the cost of the cairn to be £6,000 which was funded from the Renfrewshire Citizens Fund following a recommendation from the council’s Johnstone and the Villages Local Area Committee. The cairn was installed in New St, where Barbour was born, and was unveiled on 21 November 2015 by the Provost of Renfrewshire, Anne Hall, in the presence of Barbour's descendants.

Renfrewshire Council also agreed to establish and fund a Mary Barbour Prize to be awarded annually to a school pupil at Kilbarchan Primary School.

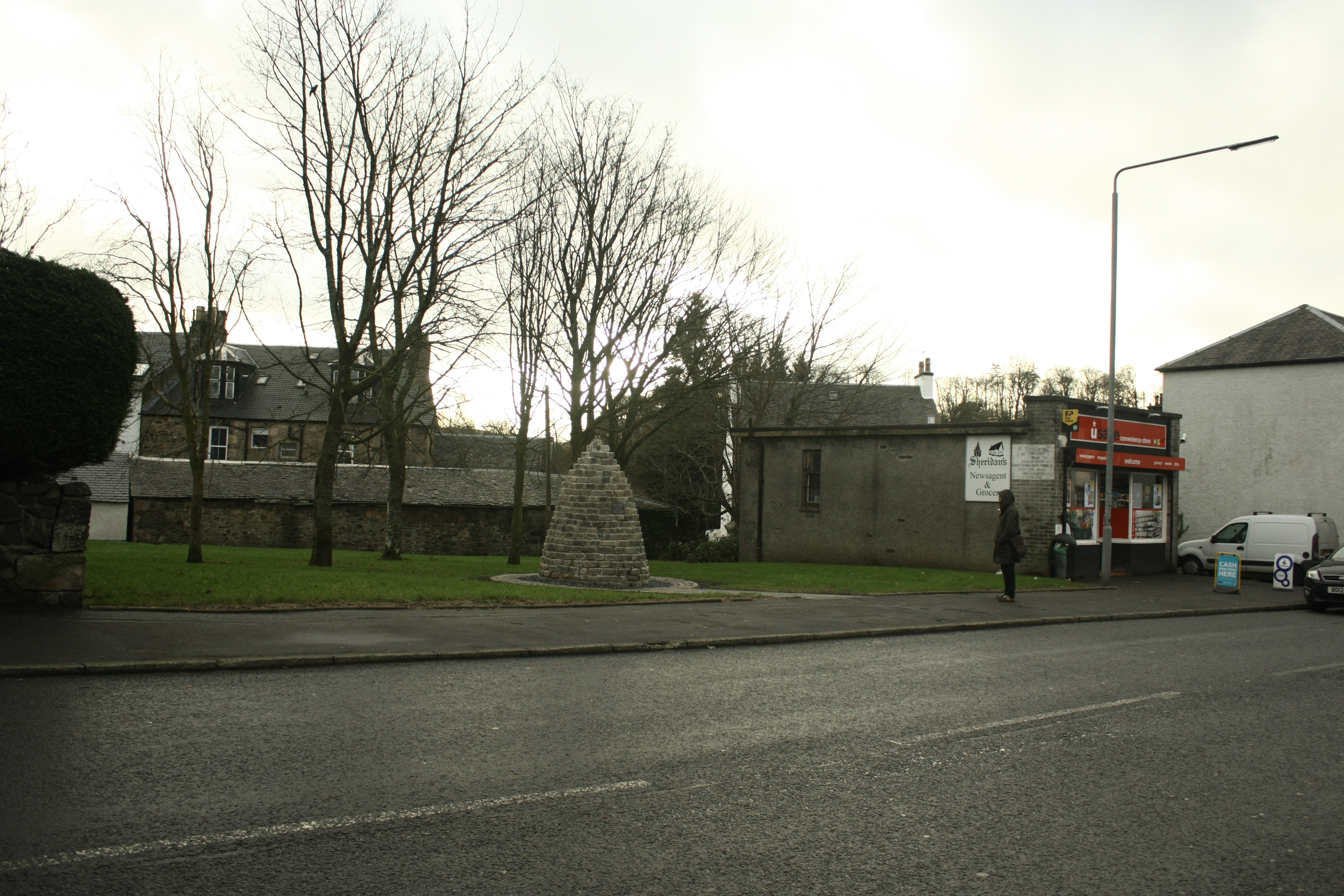
New Street, Kilbarchan, showing location of Mary Barbour Cairn

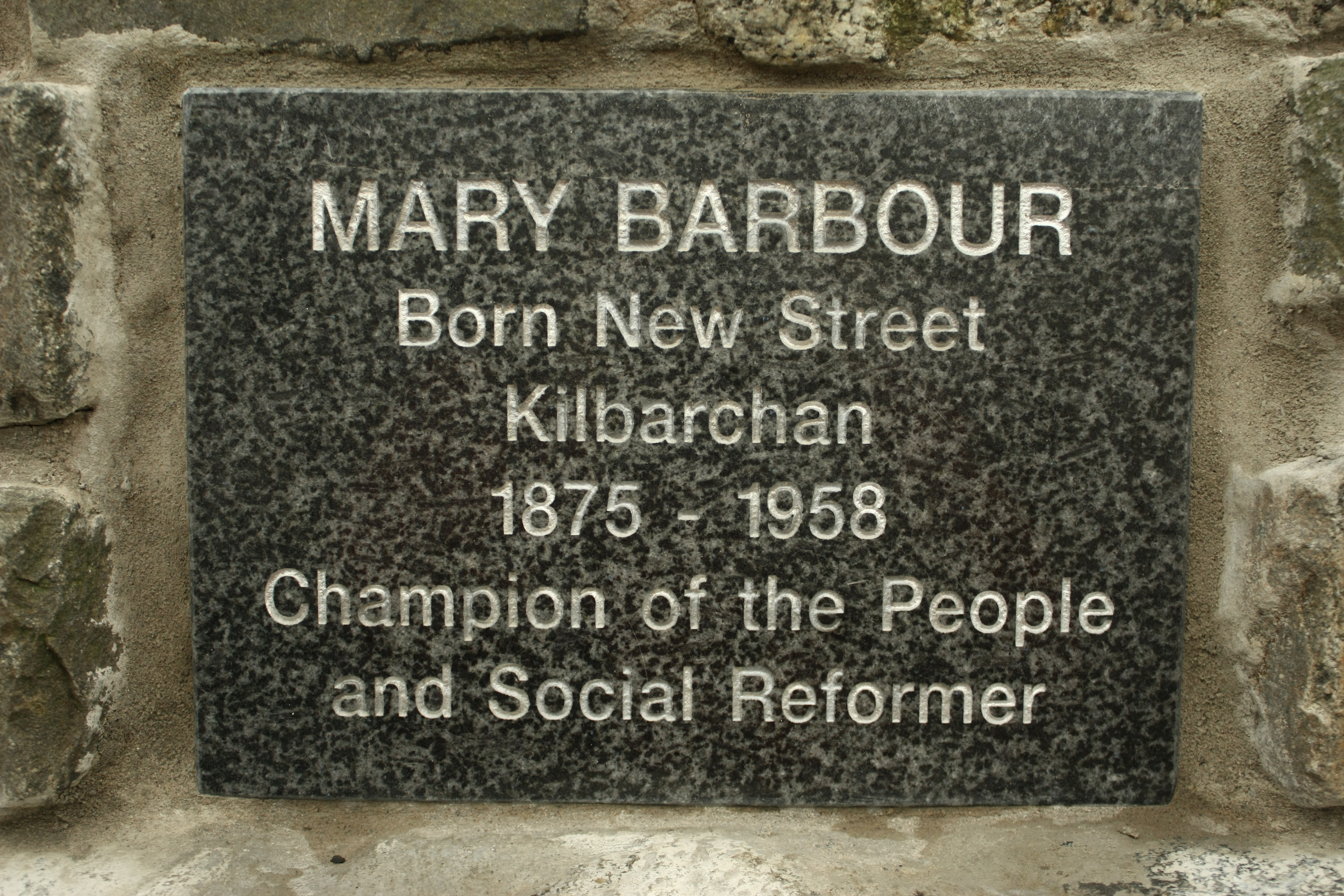
Plaque on Mary Barbour Cairn - Champion of the People and Social Reformer

=== Clutha Bar Mural ===
Mary Barbour is one of two women included in the Clutha Bar mural, and her image is based on the photograph of her in Bailie's robes, c.1924. The Clutha Bar was the site of the Glasgow helicopter crash on 29 November 2013. The mural, coordinated by Art Pistol, features work by a number of artists including Bob McNamara, who is also known as Rogue One, and Danny McDermott, known as EJEK. The mural pays homage to the history of the area, and shows a variety of people who have visited this location.

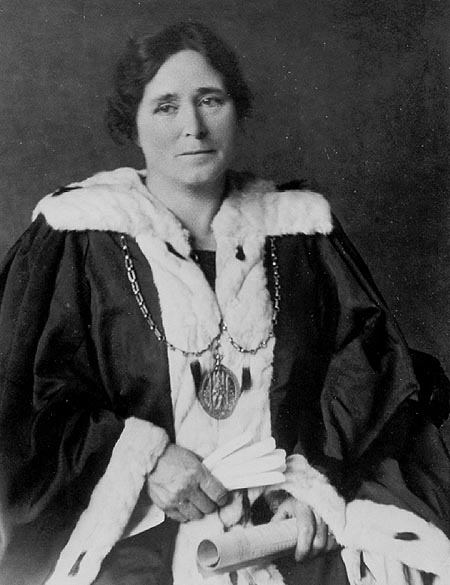
Mary Barbour c.1924 in Baillie's robes

=== Blue Plaque in Linthouse ===
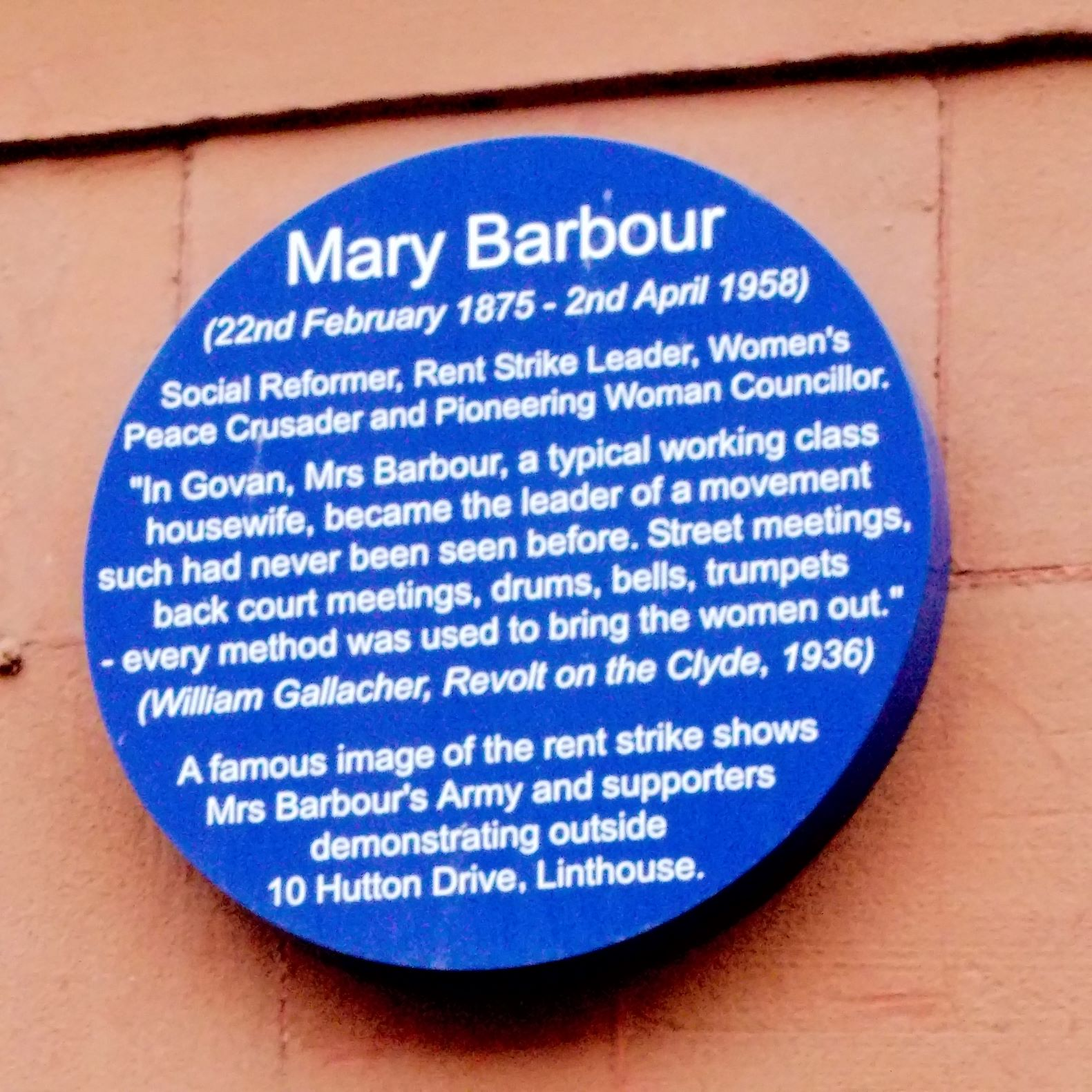
Mary Barbour Blue Plaque, 10 Hutton Drive, Linthouse

In November 2015, Linthouse Housing Association installed a blue plaque at 10 Hutton Drive, Linthouse, Glasgow to commemorate Mary Barbour and her actions, and those of many other women, during the 1915 Glasgow Rent Strikes. The location references a widely known image from the time of a gathering of people outside the tenement property taking part in a rent strike action.

The text of the plaque describes Barbour as a "Social Reformer, Rent Strike Leader, Women's Peace Crusader and Pioneering Woman Councillor", and incorporates a quote from William Gallacher's book 'Revolt on the Clyde'.

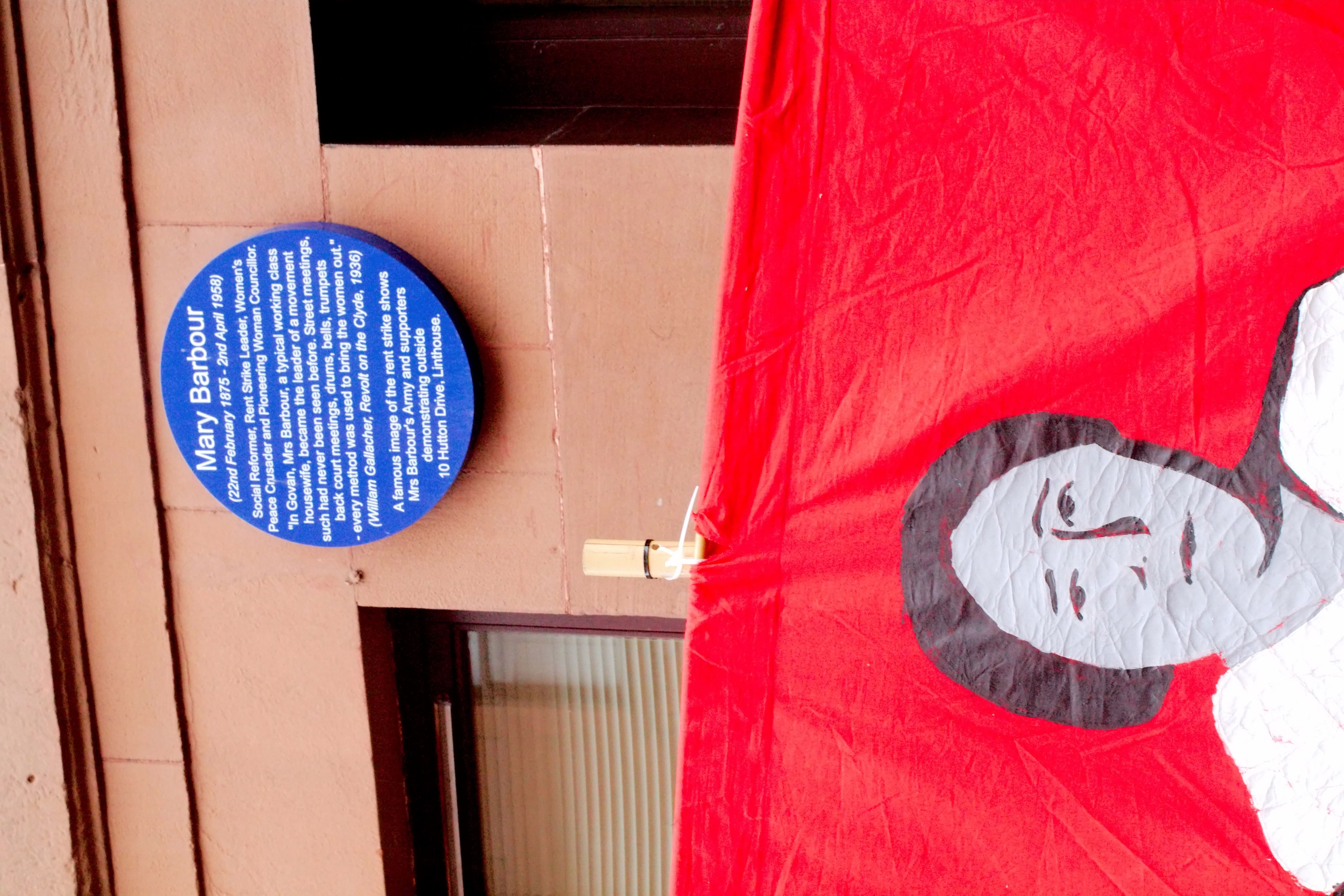
Glasgow Rent Strikes Blue Plaque and Mary Barbour banner
