= Agnes Dollan =

Scottish suffragette and activist (1887–1966)

Lady Agnes Dollan MBE
- Dollan in 1924
- Born: Agnes Johnston Moir; 16 August 1887; Springburn, Glasgow, Scotland
- Died: 16 July 1966 (aged 78); Glasgow Victoria Infirmary, Glasgow, Scotland
- Political party: Independent Labour Party; Labour Party; Scottish Socialist Party
- Spouse: Patrick Dollan
- Children: 1
- Parent(s): Anne (née Wilkinson) and Henry Moir
- Awards: Member of the Order of the British Empire (awarded 1946)

Agnes Johnston Dollan MBE (née Moir; 16 August 1887 – 16 July 1966), also known as Agnes, Lady Dollan, was a Scottish suffragette and political activist. She was a leading campaigner during the Glasgow Rent Strikes, and a founding organiser of the Women's Peace Crusade. In 1919, she was the first woman selected by the Labour party to stand for election to Glasgow Town Council, and later became Lady Provost of Glasgow.

== Early life ==
Dollan was born on Springburn Road in Springburn, Glasgow on 16 August 1887 to Anne Wilkinson and Henry Moir, a blacksmith in the locomotive works. She was one of eleven children.

Dollan attended school locally until the age of eleven before being forced to leave due to family poverty. Dollan also attended the Socialist Sunday Schools, where she "graduated as a Socialist".

On leaving school, Dollan went first to work in a factory before becoming a Post Office telephone operator. During this latter job, Dollan joined the Women's Labour League and assisted Mary Reid Macarthur in creating a women's post office trade union.

Dollan joined the Independent Labour Party (ILP) aged 18, and then the Women's Social and Political Union.

Dollan had met Patrick Dollan, a journalist and member of the Independent Labour Party, via the Clarion Scouts. Dollan was married on 20 September 1912, and her only child, James, was born in 1913, and she was exempted from religious instruction at school. James Dollan also became a journalist.

== Rent strikes and Red Clydeside ==
Agnes Dollan became politically active during the Red Clydeside period of Glasgow's history as an organiser of the 1915 Glasgow Rent Strikes alongside Mary Barbour, Helen Crawfurd, Mary Burns Laird and Mary Jeff. Dollan worked to link the rent strikes movement with peace campaigns, and as Treasurer of Glasgow Women's Housing Association led the campaign against rent increases imposed by landlords. Dollan was jailed briefly in 1917 for protesting against high rents. Dollan was also a member of The Women's Peace Crusade in Glasgow.

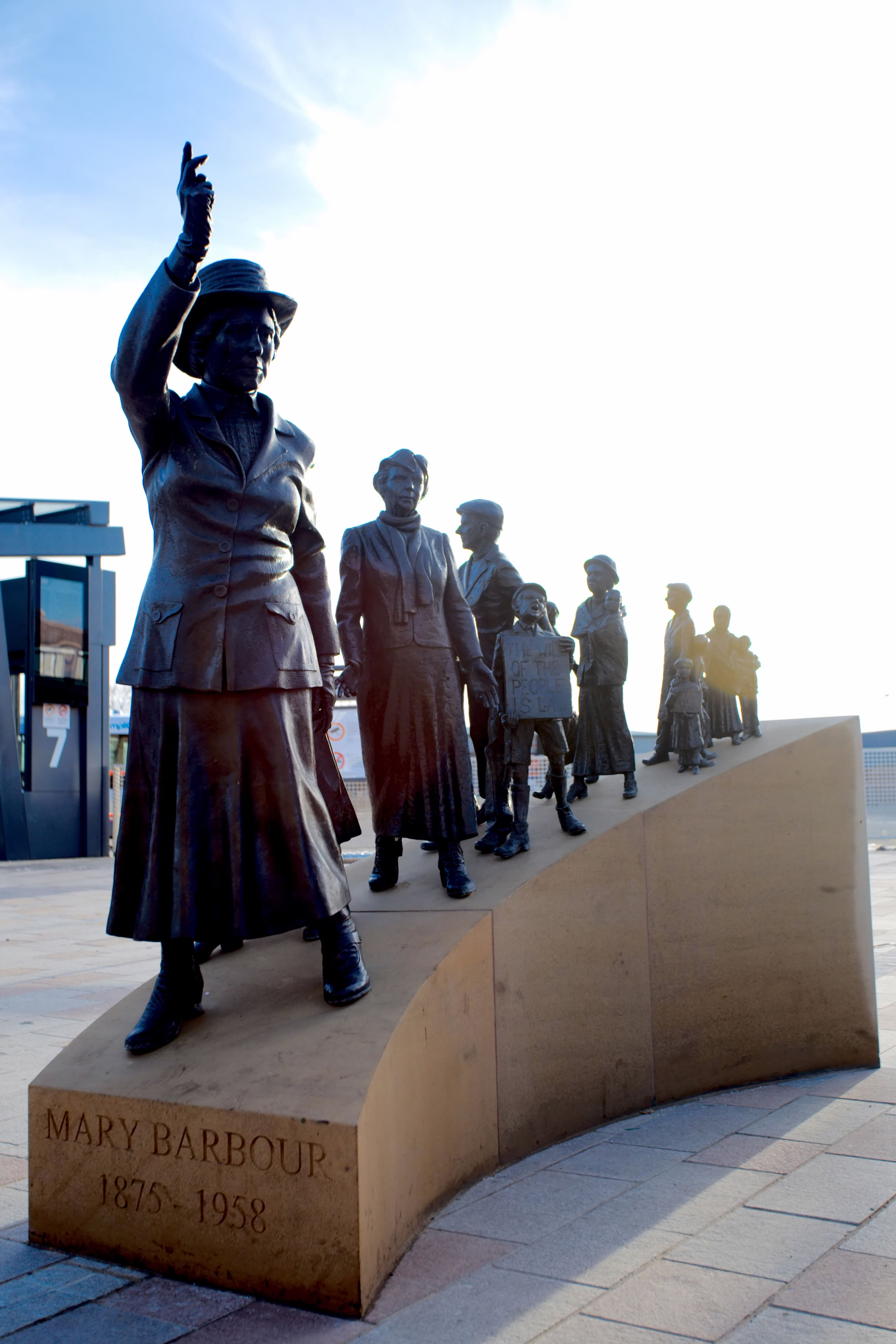
Mary Barbour Statue - Front view

Dollan became a prominent figure in Glasgow politics and spoke at the 1917 May Day demo in Glasgow Green.

Dollan was a member of the Women's Social and Political Union and the Women's Labour League.

== Political career ==
After joining the Independent Labour Party around 1915, Dollan became the first female Labour candidate to stand for election to Glasgow City Council in January 1919. On 13 December 1921, Dollan was elected in a by-election as the councillor for Springburn. Dollan successfully stood again for Council in 1922 and held the position until 1928. Dollan became a Justice of the Peace in 1928.

During 1924, Dollan wrote in The Sunday Post about the amendment of the Representation of the People Act 1918, clearly linking domestic interests as a good reason for all women to have the franchise (as this Act gave the vote to certain women only).

Dollan was the first Labour candidate to contest Dumfriesshire in the United Kingdom general election of 1924, however she was unsuccessful.

She served on the Labour Party National Executive from 1922 to 1928 and resumed her seat in the 1930s after a period of illness prevented her from participating in political activities. In 1933, she spoke at the National Conference of Labour Women, arguing that there should be more women candidates for the Labour Party.

I am convinced that our women are as good as the men, and better in some cases.

Dollan fought against the removal of the ILP from the Labour Party, however following the split she was appointed the first president of the Scottish Socialist Party's women's council in 1933. Dollan campaigned to be the Labour Party (UK) candidate for Leith in the 1935 United Kingdom general election. Dollan's key discussion points were the prospect of another war, the Unemployment Bill, and "poverty in the midst of plenty". The election was ultimately contested by David Cleghorn Thomson.

Dollan's husband Patrick served as Lord Provost of Glasgow from 1938 to 1941 however when she attended events with him, Agnes retained her own identity.

Harry McShane wrote in his autobiography:

Pat Dollan's wife was very active and, I always thought, better than he was; I'm convinced he killed her activity..

== Anti-war activism ==
Alongside Helen Crawfurd and others, Dollan established both the Women's Peace Crusade in 1916 and the Glasgow branch of the Women's International League in 1915, working with Agnes Harben and others. Both noted speakers, Dollan and Crawfurd travelled around Scotland spreading the word about the League.

She took exception to the defence of women being used as a reason for war.

With regard to the honour of women, as a woman, she objected to that being made an excuse for such a diabolical slaughter. She protested against her honour being made an excuse for war.

In 1918, Dollan spoke on behalf of the ILP on 'Russian intervention' at a meeting in Hamilton. And in 1922, Dollan and Mary Barbour spoke in Langside, discussing "the Citizenship of women and bearing on world peace, disarmament, and international justice and freedom".

Dollan later modified her anti-war stance in response to World War II, stating that:

It was all very well to theorise under normal conditions but we were not living under such conditions today - we were facing a crisis which might mean general mobilisation.

Dollan later became a member of the Moral Re-Armament Movement.

== Honours ==
Dollan was awarded an MBE in George VI's Birthday Honours list of 1946 for her war efforts as the centre organiser in Glasgow for the Women's Voluntary Services.

== Death ==
Agnes Dollan died of heart failure on 16 July 1966, aged 78, in Glasgow's Victoria Infirmary.
