= The Women's Peace Crusade =

Social movement in Great Britain

- Predecessor: Women's Peace Negotiation Crusade
- Formation: 1 July 1916; 110 years ago
- Founder: Helen Crawfurd, Agnes Dollan, Mary Barbour, Mrs Ferguson
- Founded at: Glasgow
- Type: Grassroots socialist movement
- Purpose: To negotiate an end to World War I
- Key people: Helen Crawfurd, Agnes Dollan, Mary Barbour, Mrs Ferguson

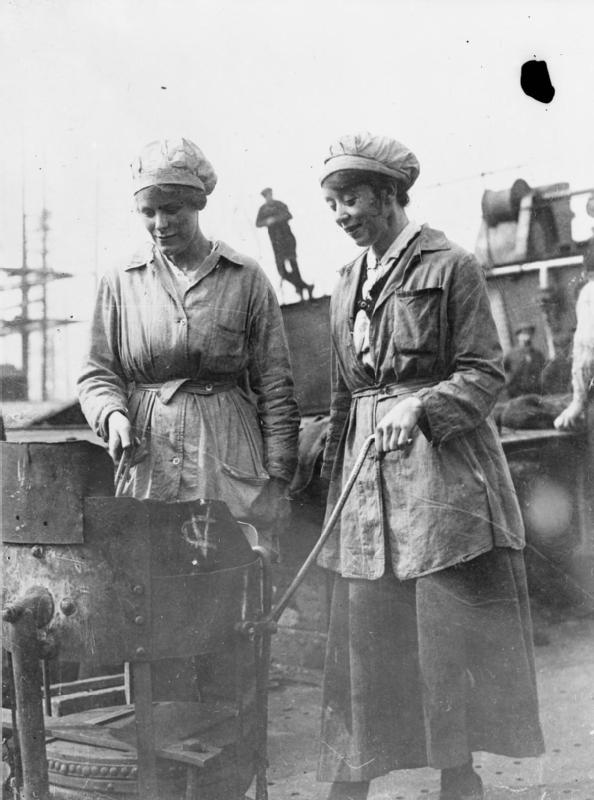
Female workers at the Harland and Wolff shipbuilding yard at Govan during the First World War

The Women's Peace Crusade was a grassroots socialist movement that spread across Great Britain between 1916 and 1918. Its central aim was to spread a 'people's peace', which was defined as a negotiated end to the First World War without any annexations or indemnities. The movement was first established in Glasgow in July 1916, and officially launched on 10 June 1917. It later spread across Great Britain, with demonstrations taking place in Leeds, Bradford, Leicester, Birmingham and Lancashire. Although it gathered a substantial following, the Women's Peace Crusade faced opposition from both the government and police, with members being arrested and reportedly threatened.

== Origins ==
The outbreak of World War I caused a schism within the pre-war efforts for women's suffrage as individuals within the suffrage movement in the United Kingdom took various stances with regards to the necessary morality of Great Britain entering the ever widening war footing that developed among neighbouring European Nations after the assassination of the Archduke Franz Ferdinand on 28 June 1914. In the early aftermath of the British Government's Declaration of War, Emmeline Pankhurst, Leader of the Women's Social and Political Union (WSPU), and from her politically motivated decision to move to Paris, announced that, from this time, the WSPU should desist from its suffrage activities and concentrate their efforts in supporting the Government's War effort.

Other women fervently disagreed with this stance. Women around Europe mobilised – against their respective Government's wishes – to convene the annual International Congress of Women in the Hague on 28 April 1915. One hundred and ninety women applied for permission to attend by the British Government. Of these, 166 had their passports either refused of cancelled. The remaining 24 were considered to be non-militant and allowed to attend. The conference culminated in the creation of various anti-war projects such as The International Committee of Women for Permanent Peace and the Women's International League (WIL). Helen Crawfurd – an Independent Labour Party (ILP) representative and a lapsed member of WSPU – was the secretary of the Glasgow branch of the WIL. Even within the Glasgow branch, class divisions became evident between the middle class and the working-class membership. Helen Crawfurd consequently singled herself, Agnes Dollan, Mary Barbour and, Mrs Ferguson out as the 'local propagandists' of the Glasgow ILP branch, and it was this coalition of women who went on to become founding members of the Women's Peace Crusade.

The Women's Peace Crusade, sometimes referred to as the Women's Peace Negotiation Crusade, originated in Glasgow at a demonstration on 23 July 1916, which drew a crowd of 5,000 people. The demonstration had been organised by Helen Crawfurd, a working class feminist and socialist who had played a significant role in the Glasgow Rent Strike of 1915. The protest came after a letter was published in the Labour Leader condemning the women of Britain for not organising any protests against the war. The first meetings took place in Maryhill and Springburn, and subsequent activities included street meetings, marches, selling badges and distributing literature.

== Aims ==
The central demand of the Women's Peace Crusade was to negotiate an immediate end to the First World War, but there were specific aims within this. Literature distributed by the movement stated that it aimed to allow all nations to choose their own form of government, to be fully developed, to access the world's markets and raw materials, and to travel freely. They set themselves against the idea of the right of conquest and forcible annexation, the attempt to retain or increase trade barriers, and any attempt to impose crushing indemnities on any one nation. As well as this, they supported the limitation of armaments and the international organisation of people, aiming to create a common understanding of common interests that they termed 'a people's peace'.

== Members ==
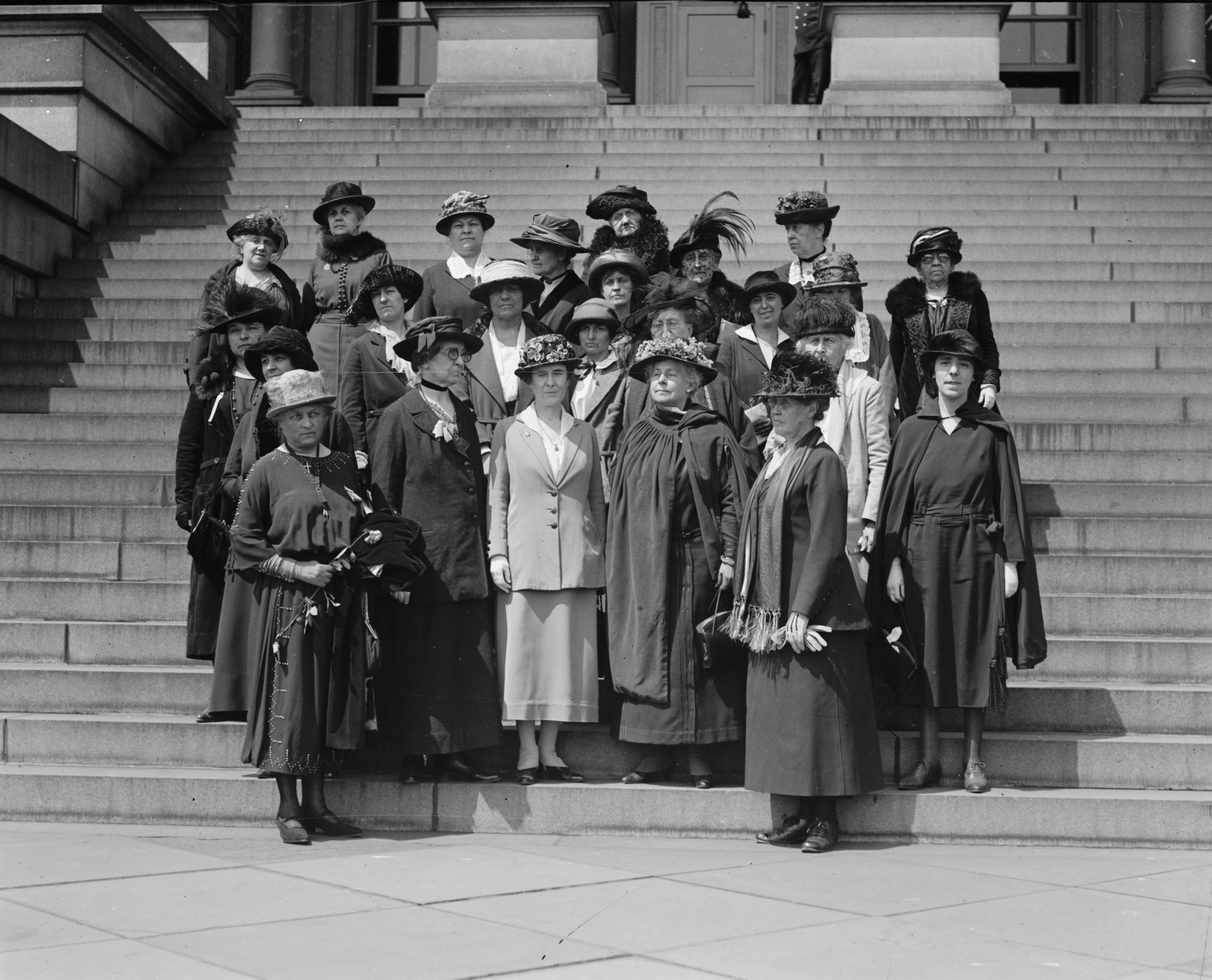
The Women's International League

The Women's Peace Crusade was among the largest peace movements in Glasgow during the First World War, and it was also the one with the most working class, grassroots support. Helen Crawfurd was one of the founders of the Women's Peace Crusade, and also founded the Glasgow branch of the Women's International League for Peace and Freedom, but later said that she was never a pacifist. Instead, she was 'an international socialist with a profound hatred of war with all its ghastly cruelty and waste'. Fractions within the Glasgow branch of the Women's International League led to divisions between the middle class and working class members, and subsequently Helen Crawfurd, along with other working class members, formed the Women's Peace Crusade. These other members included Agnes Dollan, Miss Walker, Mrs Barbour and Mrs Ferguson. While the Women's International League had focused on holding monthly meetings with speakers and discussions, the Women's Peace Crusade now took the anti-war message onto the streets and into working class communities. Other notable members have included Helen Swanwick.

== Opposition ==
The Women's Peace Crusade met with a great deal of opposition from both the government and the media. The right-wing Morning Post described the movement as "one of the most active and pernicious propaganda organisations in the country". On 11 August 1917, a march of 1,200 women in Lancashire was met with a great deal of hostility. Upon arriving at Nelson's recreation ground, a crowd of 50,000 counter-demonstrators began shouting 'Traitors! Murderers!' at the group, and only a police presence stopped them from being physically harmed.

== See also ==
- Opposition to World War I
- Women in World War I
