= Jessie Stephen =

British suffragette (1893–1979)

Jessie Stephen MBE
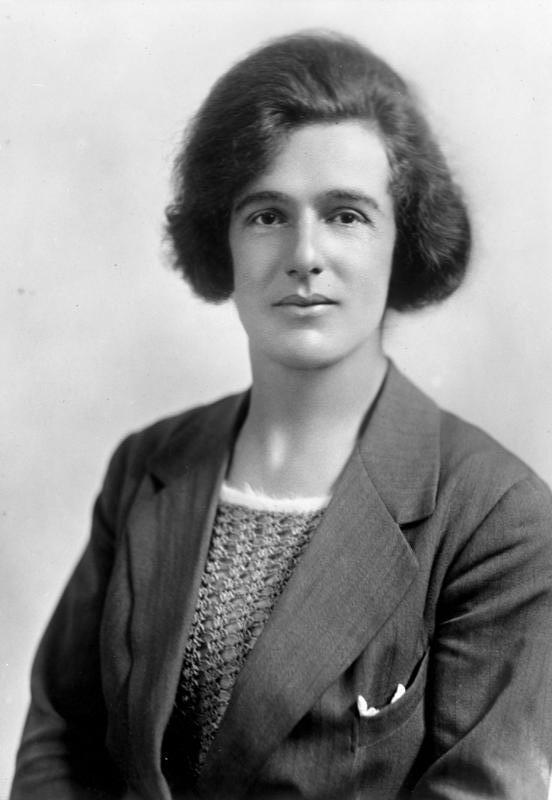
- 1930 portrait (aged 36–37)
- Born: 19 April 1893; Marylebone, London, England
- Died: 12 June 1979 (aged 86); Bristol, England
- Occupation: Journalist
- Known for: Trade unionism; Councillor

Jessie Stephen, MBE (19 April 1893 – 12 June 1979) was a twentieth-century British suffragette, labour activist and local councillor. She grew up in Scotland and won a scholarship to train as a teacher. Family finances dictated otherwise, leading to her becoming a domestic worker at the age of 15. She became involved in national labour issues as a teenager, via organisations such as the Independent Labour Party and the Women's Social and Political Union. Stephen moved to London during World War I and in the 1920s she toured the United States and Canada, where she held meetings with the public including migrant English domestic workers.

Stephen was elected as a local councillor several times and stood as a candidate in general elections. After moving to Bristol in the 1940s she became the first woman president of Bristol Trades Council. She was appointed MBE in 1977 and her life is commemorated by a blue plaque in Bristol.

== Biography ==
Stephen is recorded in the Oxford Dictionary of National Biography as a "suffragette and labour activist", and has been described as "virtually the only Scottish working-class Women's Social and Political Union (WSPU) member about whom anything is known".

=== Early life and family ===
Jessie Stephen was born in Marylebone, London, on 19 April 1893, the eldest of the eleven children of tailor Alexander Stephen and his wife Jane Miller. The family moved to Edinburgh, then Dunfermline, before settling in Glasgow in 1901. Stephen's father was a founder member of the Independent Labour Party (ILP) when it was established and she described her mother as being "so quiet and the very opposite of dad".

She attended Sunday schools separately linked to the church and to socialism, and was educated at North Kelvinside School. She won a scholarship to train as a pupil-teacher. Family circumstances meant that she could not afford to pursue her aspiration to become a teacher, and she became a domestic worker at the age of 15.

Unfortunately for my dreams, unemployment became worse so there was nothing for it but to leave [scholarship as a pupil teacher].

— Jessie Stephen, quoted by Jill Liddington in The Road to Greenham Common: Feminism and Anti-Militarism in Britain Since 1820

=== Early career ===
She was referred to as a "young activist in the Maryhill Branch of the ILP", before she joined the WSPU in 1909, aged 16. In around 1911–12, as noted in her unpublished autobiography Submission is for Slaves (held at the Working Class Movement Library in Manchester), she formed the Scottish Federation of Domestic Workers. She organised her fellow maids through meetings firstly in the streets and later in Alston's Tea Rooms in Bothwell Street, Glasgow. The organisation eventually merged with the London-based Domestic Workers' Union of Great Britain and Ireland in 1913.

Stephen was the youngest member of the WSPU Glasgow delegation to the Chancellor of the Exchequer David Lloyd George in 1912, and, she took part in the first of the "Scottish Outrages", involving attacks on pillar boxes, in Glasgow in February 1913. Her job as a maid worked in her favour during these attacks, as she explained in a 1975 interview:

"I was able to drop acid into the postal pillar boxes without being suspected, because I walked down from where I was employed in my cap, muslin apron and black frock... nobody would ever suspect me of dropping acid through the box."

Stephen was approached by Sylvia Pankhurst and moved from Glasgow to London, where she became considered one of the "most active members" (along with Emma Boyce, around 1916) of the Workers' Suffrage Federation. In April 1919, Stephen was one of a number of speakers to address a crowd of "about 10,000 people" in Trafalgar Square, opposing the Blockade of Germany. Other speakers included Emmeline Pethick-Lawrence and Theodora Wilson Wilson. She was also an active member of the Women's Peace Crusade and at the 1920 ILP conference argued against the use of force during events preceding the Treaty on the Creation of the USSR.

In the 1920s she visited the United States, holding public meetings with immigrant communities from Scotland and Wales. and fund-raising for the Socialist Party of America. She also visited Vancouver, where she encouraged migrant English domestic workers to unionise.

=== Middle years ===
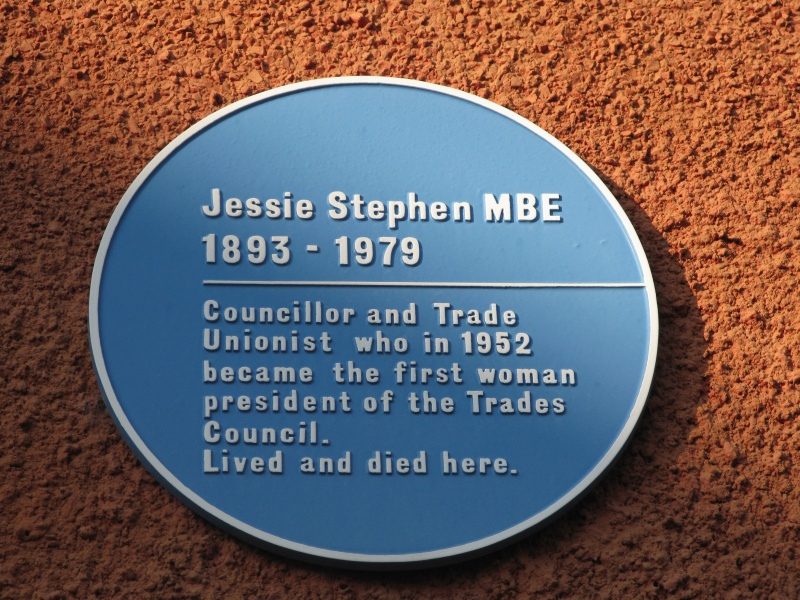
Blue plaque in Bedminster, Bristol

Stephen later lived in Lancashire and also in London, where she became involved in the East London Federation and sold the Women's Dreadnought. She was elected Labour borough councillor for Bermondsey in 1922, after failing to be selected as a parliamentary candidate for the ILP, and worked for Bermondsey MP Alfred Salter. She stood as Labour candidate for Portsmouth South in the general elections of 1923, 1924 and 1929, and for Kidderminster in 1931.

From 1924 she worked as a freelance journalist, established a secretarial agency in Lewes in 1935 and joined the National Union of Clerks in 1938. At the time of the Second World War, she worked for Murphy Radio in Welwyn Garden City.

=== Later life ===
In 1944 Stephen was appointed as the first woman area union organiser of the National Clerical and Administrative Workers' Union for South Wales and the West of England and moved to Bristol. She also worked at the Broad Quay branch of the Co-operative Wholesale Society (CWS), later becoming chair of the local CWS management committee. Around this time, she spoke publicly and gave advice on birth control. She was elected to the city council. In 1952 she became the first woman president of Bristol Trades Council and in 1955 she was awarded the TUC Gold Badge.

In the 1964 general election, she was a candidate for the Labour Party in the Weston-super-Mare constituency. She was appointed MBE for "services to the trade union movement" in June 1977.

In later life Stephen was blind. She died from pneumonia and heart failure at Bristol General Hospital on 12 June 1979.

=== Commemoration ===
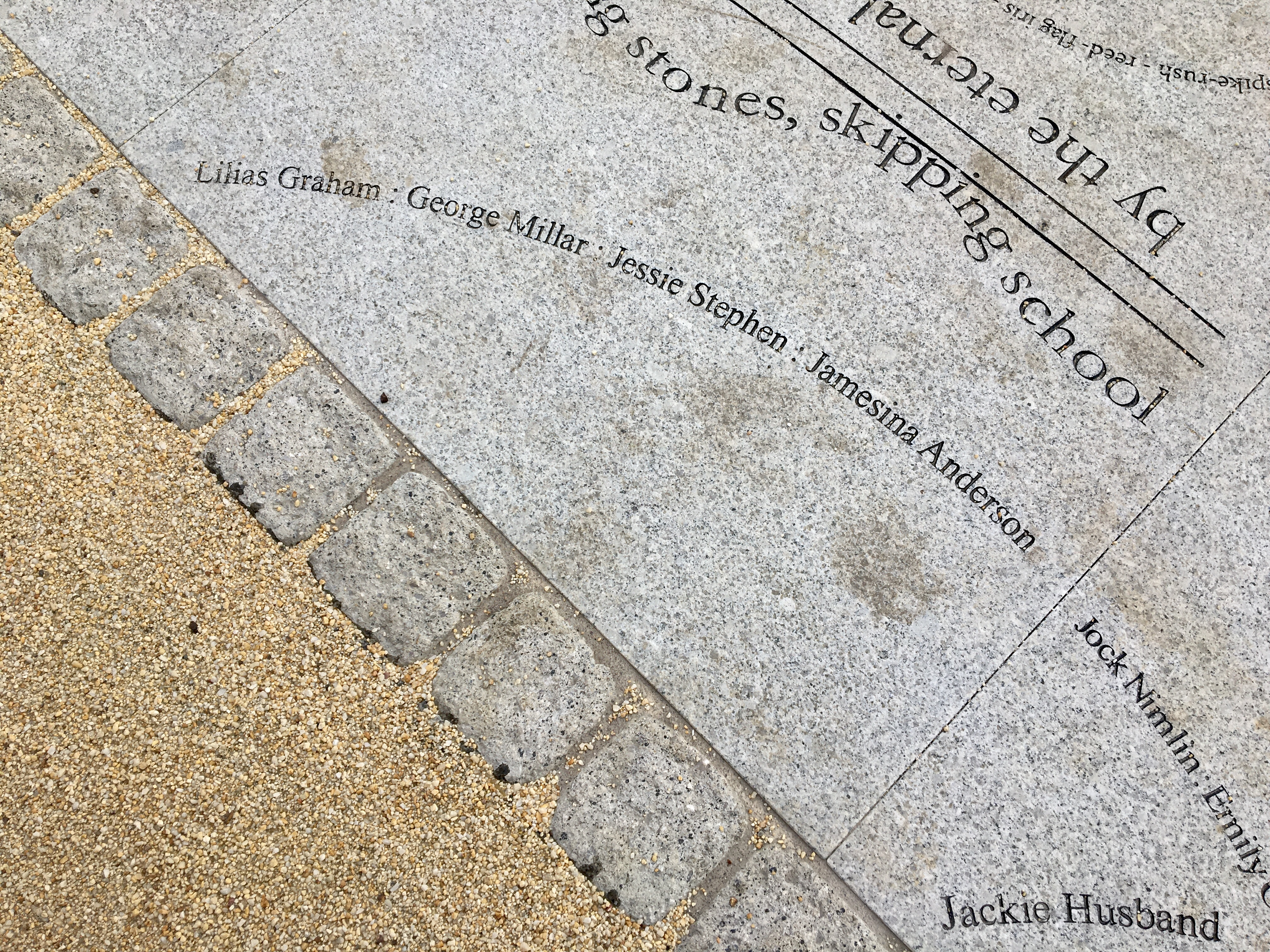
River of Words by Anoushka Havinden (detail)

Stephen's life is commemorated by a blue plaque at her former home in Bedminster, Bristol. On 10 November 1995, the Party of European Socialists group in Bristol honoured her memory by holding the inaugural Jessie Stephen memorial lecture, 'Women in European politics'.

She is included in River of Words, an artwork by Anoushka Havinden at the Stockingfield Junction on the Forth and Clyde Canal in Maryhill, Glasgow, which lists local people of historic significance.

Stephen's unpublished autobiography, Submission is for Slaves, is available in the Working Class Movement Library in Salford. Brian Harrison recorded an oral history interview with Stephen, in July 1977, as part of the Suffrage Interviews project, titled Oral evidence on the suffragette and suffragist movements: the Brian Harrison interviews. Stephen talks about the influence of her Father, her activities with the WSPU, the East London Federation of Suffragettes, the National Federation of Women Workers, the National Union of Clerks, the Women's Cooperative Guild, and the Workers' Birth Control Group as well as her involvement with Sylvia Pankhurst.

She is also the subject of a short animation made as part of Glasgow Women's Library's Vote 100 project and an exhibition Jessie Stephen: Maryhill's Suffragette at Maryhill Burgh Halls running from 11th March 2025 to 13th June 2025. In April 2025, the BBC published an interview with Anabel Marsh who curated the exhibition, and included an account of Stephen's life and career in the piece.

The tour company "Gallus Pedals" has named a bicycle after her as one of ten Glasgow women "Trailblazers" in various categories. Stephen, along with Mary Barbour and Rachel Hamilton is in the category "Women who Shaped Glasgow's Social Change"
