= 1915 Glasgow rent strikes =

Housing protests in Glasgow, Scotland

- Part of Red Clydeside § Rent strikes
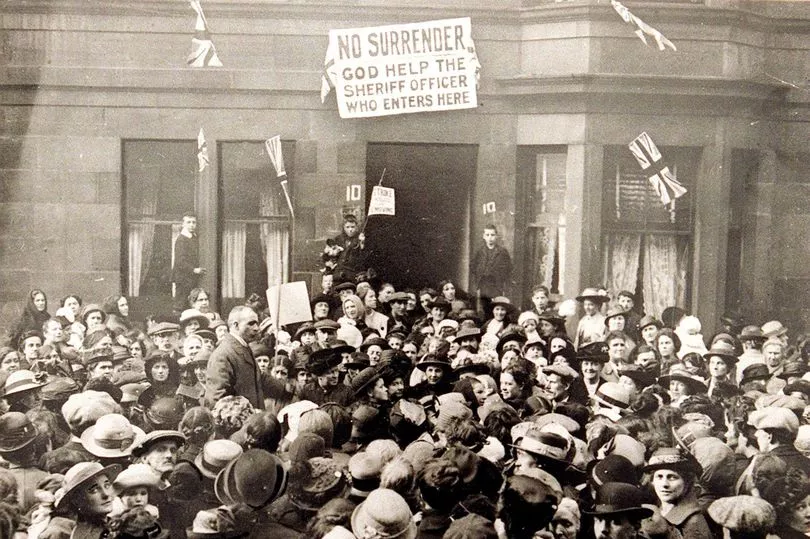
- Strike demonstration outside a house in Govan, Glasgow
- Date: March 1915 – November 1915
- Location: Glasgow, Scotland
- Caused by: Rent increases
- Result: Passage of rent control

Parties
Glasgow Women's Housing Association	Landlords

Number
20,000 – 25,000 households	

The 1915 Glasgow rent strikes were a series of mobilisations by tenants in Glasgow, Scotland, opposing rent increases by landlords, who raised rents following a housing shortage.

== Background ==
In February 1915 Glasgow landlords announced that all rents would be increased by 25%. In response meetings were held by tenants across the city. That same month the Glasgow Women's Housing Association had its first meeting to resist rent increases.

In Govan in March 1915, a landlord attempted to evict a woman in response to her rent debt of £1 (equivalent to £89 in 2025). In response, hundreds of angry neighbours led by John Wheatley, a socialist politician and member of the Independent Labour Party (ILP), blocked the way into her apartment, which prevented the evictors from carrying out the eviction.

== Strike ==
The rent strikes formally began in September 1915 by the Glasgow Women's Housing Association. However many tenants were already withholding sections of rent before then, paying only the normal amount before the increase, refusing to comply with the rent raise.

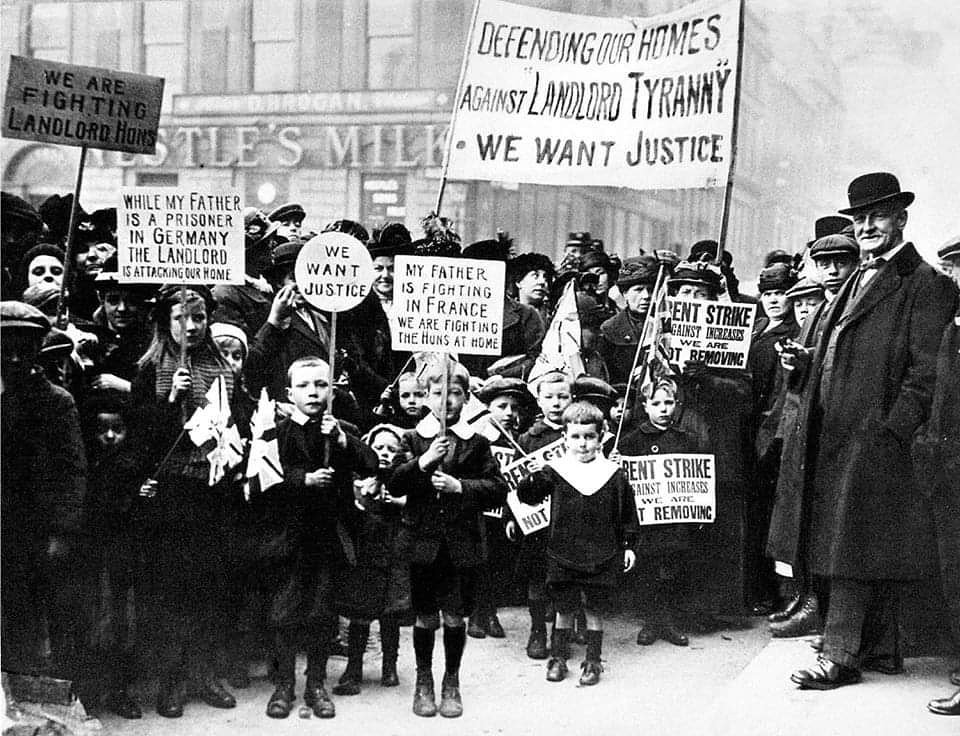
A pro-strike demonstration.

Mary Barbour, also a member of the ILP, led much of the rent strikes. The peak of the strikes was in November 1915, when around 20,000 families were participating. One notable victory for tenants occurred after the city attempted to charge 49 tenants for striking on 17 November. In response to the charges striking residents gathered outside the courthouse and lead a massive demonstration outside for the entire day which led the city to drop all charges.

Soon after on 25 November, the Increase of Rent and Mortgage Interest (War Restrictions) Act 1915 was introduced and passed by parliament on 27 November. It froze rent increases at 1914 levels unless landlords could prove improvements were made to the property. The law however was consistently weakened after 1915.

== See also ==
- South Govan Women's Housing Association
- Red Clydeside § Rent strikes
- 1907 New York City Rent Strike
