= George Peet =

British communist activist and trade unionist (1883–1967)

George Peet (24 August 1883 – 21 November 1967) was a British communist activist and trade unionist.

Born in Derby, Peet became a fitter in the railway works, and joined the Amalgamated Society of Engineers (ASE) in 1904. He soon moved to Manchester, where he worked at the Gorton Railway Works, and for the first time became active in the union, winning election as branch secretary.

Peet became a socialist, joining the Openshaw Socialist Society, and developed an interest in syndicalism, representing Gorton at the First Conference on Industrial Syndicalism in 1910. Around the start of World War I, he joined the British Socialist Party (BSP), alongside Harry Pollitt. Increasingly prominent in his trade union work, in 1916 he came eighth out of twenty-two candidates for the assistant general secretaryship of the ASE.

Inspired by the Clyde Workers' Committee, Peet worked with William McLaine to form the Manchester Workers' Committee in April 1916. Initially, it attracted little interest, but in September a decision to increase the wages of hourly-paid engineering workers but not those of piece workers led to a strike, which the committee supported. Although the strike was soon over, the dispute was not settled for a further three months, and the strike committee then agreed to merge with the Workers' Committee, forming the Manchester Joint Engineering Shop Stewards' Committee, with Peet as secretary.

The Shop Stewards' Committee played a prominent role in subsequent disputes around exemptions of trained engineers from military service and compelling engineers to work on non-munition work. While the ASE supported local action on these issues, the Committee organised a ballot on solidarity action. This was won, and led to a major two-week strike which spread around the country, ultimately involving 200,000 engineering workers. Peet travelled the country supporting the strike, until he and Arthur MacManus were arrested in London. They and their colleagues then agreed to sign an agreement between the ASE and the Ministry of Munitions which settled the strike and, as a result, Peet and MacManus were released.

In August 1917, Peet was an organiser of a national conference of shop stewards' organisations. This formed the permanent Shop Stewards' and Workers' Committees, of which Peet served as secretary, alongside MacManus as chair, and J. T. Murphy as assistant secretary. Two months later, it merged with a movement for the amalgamation of engineering unions, which had been founded in 1915 but had achieved little during the war. The organisation supported the October Revolution, and Peet became its representative to the Hands Off Russia movement. It hoped to affiliate to the Third International; this was not permitted, as it was not a political party, but it joined the Red International of Labour Unions, Peet and Ted Lismer becoming joint secretaries of its British Bureau.

The Shop Stewards' Committee became part of the National Workers' Committee in 1921, and Peet was prominent in its calls for a general strike on Black Friday. This was unsuccessful, and Peet was arrested, jailed for a month, and fined £100. The National Workers' Committee in turn merged with the British Bureau in 1922, Peet remaining joint secretary for a year, after which the Comintern ordered that Willie Gallacher and J. R. Campbell replace him and Lismer.

In 1920, the BSP became part of the new Communist Party of Great Britain (CPGB), and Peet served on its Manchester District Committee. However, his replacement as secretary of the British Bureau appears to have shaken his support for the party; he resigned from the CPGB some time after 1923, and did not undertake any further political activity.

Peet remained active in the ASE, and was one of its delegates to the Trades Union Congress in 1918. He also served as a tutor for the Manchester Labour College. The ASE became the Amalgamated Engineering Union, and Peet devoted himself to the branch, and was still branch treasurer when he died, in 1967.
