= Marjory Newbold =

Scottish activist and school teacher

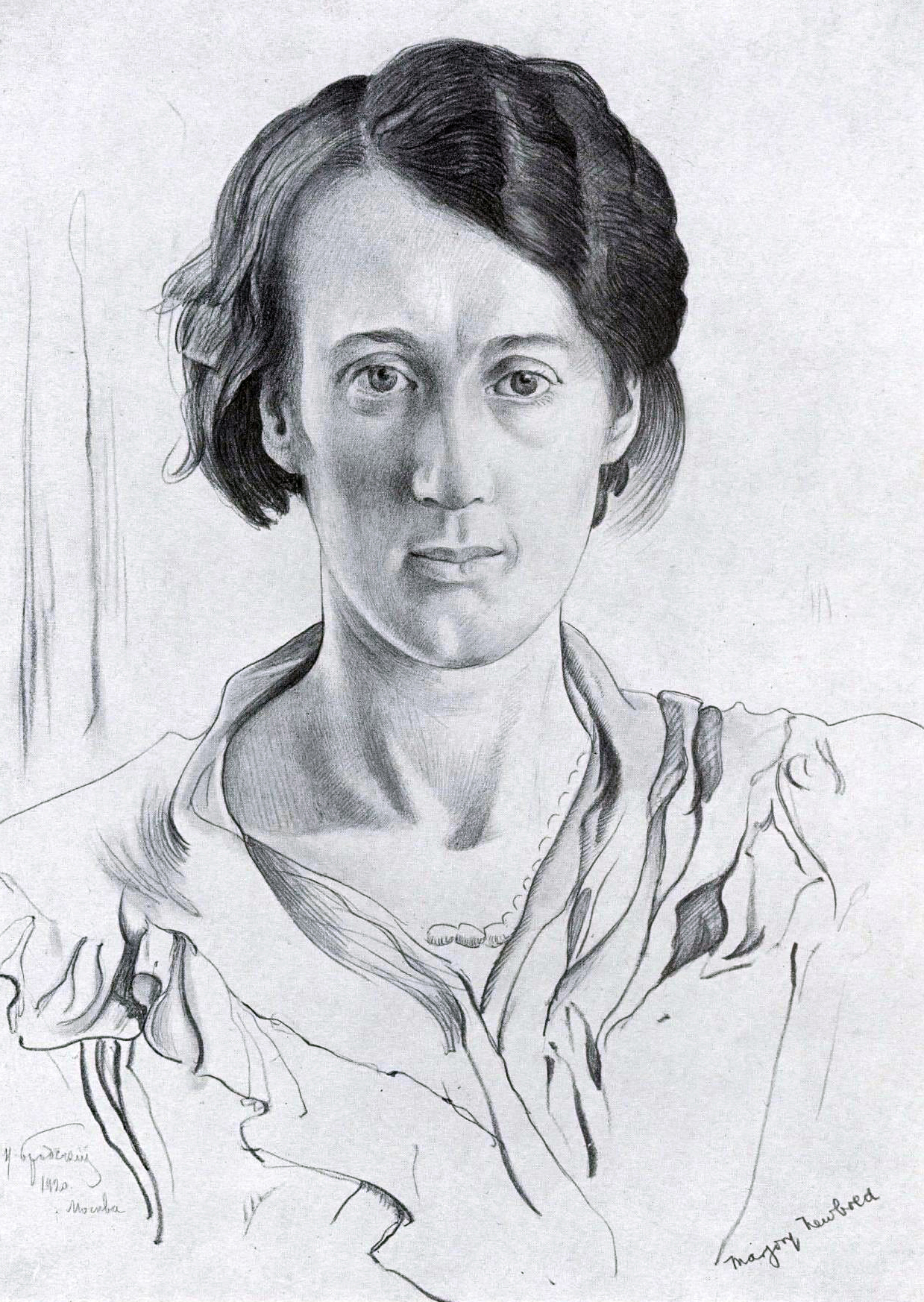
- Born: Marjory Neilson; 25 May 1883; Beith, Ayrshire, Scotland
- Died: 15 November 1926 (aged 43); Beith, Ayrshire, Scotland
- Burial place: Beith Cemetery
- Education: Glasgow University
- Occupation: school teacher
- Employer: Wishaw School
- Organization(s): Scottish Socialist Teachers Society; Wishaw Housing Council; Hands Off Russia Committee; No-Conscription Fellowship
- Known for: socialism and communism, social activism
- Political party: Independent Labour Party; Communist Party
- Spouse(s): Walton Newbold, MP and communist

Marjory Newbold (25 May 1883 – 15 November 1926) was a leading Scottish socialist and communist, prominent in the Independent Labour Party and in the 'Red Clydeside' movement demanding reforms for the working class. Newbold organised pacifist and Marxist activism in 1917–1920s across the UK, and was one of the first British people to visit Russia after the revolution when she travelled incognito into Russia with delegates including Sylvia Pankhurst, to the Second World Congress of the Comintern (Communist International).

== Family life and education ==
Born Marjory Neilson on 25 May 1883, she was the eldest of four children of Alexander Neilson (born 1859 in Arbroath, Angus) and his wife née Mary Steven Fettes (born1957, also Arbroath) at Winton Terrace, Beith, Ayrshire. Newbold's father was a Presbyterian and a cabinet-maker, earning enough to send his daughter to higher education after schooling at Beith Academy. Her siblings were Annie (born 1886) and Eliza (born 1889) and brother Alexander (1892–1980), who in January 1917 was imprisoned for refusing to serve as a soldier in World War I. By 1891, the family had moved to 14 New Street, Beith, and had a boarder Archibald Flemington, a french polisher.

Newbold studied from 1902 to 1905 at Glasgow University, but did not have sufficient grades to graduate in the arts, perhaps as she became a political activist whilst a student. Newbold went on to teach at Wishaw elementary state school from 1908 to 1916, being a pupil teacher from 1901. By 1911, Newbold was a school teacher, and herself a boarder with George and Marion Kirkcaldy at 96 Glasgow Road, Wishaw, an industrial area where she saw the deprivation endured by children of working families and poor and limited facilities for their education. Newbold was said to be 'gifted with intellectual abilities of a high order' and had 'warm human sympathies with the struggles of the poor' and she embraced socialist activism to work to improve opportunities in education, health, welfare and housing for the working class.

Newbold met John Turner Walton Newbold (1888–1943), a fellow socialist, and a research student from Buxton, Derbyshire, whom she met at a lecture in December 1913, a few months after his previous long engagement to 'Red' Ellen Wilkinson had been called off by his fiancée. Marjory and Walton were engaged in April 1914, and married in a civil ceremony in Blythswood, Glasgow on 16 June 1915. Then, as was required for a married woman, Newbold had to resign her job as a teacher.

== Political career ==
Whilst still a student, Newbold joined the Independent Labour Party and adopted atheist, feminist and socialist beliefs which she put into activism for improving conditions for the working classes. The Wishaw branch of ILP thrived under her leadership, when she 'did a deal of spade work' introducing a socialist Sunday school for children and adults, which grew from 14 to over 60 members, and as well as social time together, provided lectures and literature for developing solidarity and political education to assist in building the movement for social justice. From 1912 to 1916, Newbold took on responsibilities at the divisional council of the Scottish ILP, and became an election agent, and did so again later for her husband in 1922 and 1923. Whilst she was teaching, Newbold had been actively involved in the Scottish Socialist Teachers Society. Newbold became secretary to Wishaw Housing Council, pressing for changes for the working class.

After her marriage, her politics became more Marxist and in 1917–18, Newbold was involved in the Hands Off Russia Committee. Newbold led the No-Conscription Fellowship for Scotland, and she joined young socialist pacifist activist groups in Edmonton, London. In 1919–20, Newbold established in Manchester a branch of the National League of Working Youth, a more communist group. Within the local ILP, Newbold had acted as the secretary for a more revolutionary left-wing campaign movement, and then she joined the British Communist Party in 1921.

== International engagement ==
On 24 April 1920, the Newbolds were living at 6 Grange Road, Buxton, Derbyshire and Marjory Newbold was the chair of the National Young Labour League and writing in communist press, to encourage donations following resolution of the Conference of the League for Communist Youth (Berlin November 1919) for a memorial circulating collection of the works of Karl Leibknecht, from America, Norway, Sweden, Holland and Italy.

During summer 1920, Newbold travelled incognito to Russia, along with other British delegates such as John S. Clarke, Helen Crawfurd, Williie Gallacher, William McLaine, JT Murphy, Sylvia Pankhurst, Tom Quelch, Dave Ramsay and Jack Tanner and was attending as a voting member to the Second World Congress of the Comintern (Communist International) in Petrograd, Russia.

Newbold's six-month visit included time in Leningrad, observing the Soviet system. At the Congress, Newbold briefed delegates on the communist movement within ILP and the nascent Communist Party in the UK and learned about the Soviet principles and experience for women and children. Newbold wrote about her experience in Petrograd for The Communist, describing visits to sumptuous palaces that had been taken over for workers' accommodation for recuperation from poverty and malnutrition and in need of health care. Newbold linked this to a call to lift the blockade on Russia by Britain and other nations. Newbold described decor of a palace now the home to 45 factory workers where 'the library, billiard-room, terrace and the grand piano were all being made use of by the workers'. Newbold also found that a former sugar factory owner's 105 room holiday home now housed not a rich couple, but 150 workers, where the head of food provision for the two-week respite was a former chef to Tsar Nicholas II, and seven boats were available for use on the artificial lake.

Newbold herself was not physically strong and her fellow delegate Dora Russell, noted that she was:

small, very thin and pale and not unlike the ILP leader James Maxton. Like so many communists I was to meet then and later she was totally convinced and dogmatic and willing to make any sacrifice for the cause. I liked Marjory and her spirit, her courage and her endurance, but her physical strength was not enough.

In April 1921, Newbold formally joined the British Communist Party, with hundreds of ILP members, but was unfit to campaign widely.

In 1923, Newbold was a member of Helen Crawfurd's committee raising funds or encouraging donations of clothing for 1,400 of the over 2 million starving and homeless Russian children, along with Evelyn Sharp, George Lansbury MP, Honoria Enfield, Dr V.N. Polovtsev (Russian Red Cross), Mrs Montefiore, Mrs Winifred Horrabin, Mrs CH Norman, Mrs Mark Starr, Ellen Wilkinson, Nellie Lansbury and Mrs Ewer.

Division within the woman's international peace movement and the British Communists about the role of women-only groupings, led to Newbold's name and Helen Crawfurd's being removed from the records of the Women's International League, by Ellen Wilkinson. Newbold's speeches for supporting Russian children to the British communists were not as successful as she had originally hoped.

== Illness and death ==
After the International Congress, Newbold's health deteriorated, coming home 'a shadow of her former self' with a 'lingering illness from which she was never to recover' due to a fatal infection of tuberculosis, which prevented her continuing active political leadership. Newbold remained committed to 'the great cause of the international commonwealth' and remained a Communist to the end of her life. When her husband, Walton declared for Labour rather than Communist candidate for Derby in 1926, Newbold was described as an 'invalid', and regretted that her poor health had prevented her assisting Walton Newbold in serving as Wishaw's M.P. Locally Walton was known as 'Madge's man' in the socialist and working class community of Motherwell-Wishaw.

On 15 November 1926, Newbold died at home in Bellscauseway, Beith. Newbold is buried in Beith Cemetery.

Despite her short career, Marjory Newbold had made a 'distinctive contribution to the labour and socialist movement', she was 'known to many in the Labour movement in Wishaw' and news of her sudden death was expected in her obituary to be 'received with keen regret'.

== See also ==
Image (line drawing) Marjory Newbold by Russian artist Ivan Brodsky https://www.flickr.com/photos/amber-tree/49349073028

Image (photo) of the British delegation to 2nd Comintern, gathered with Sylvia Pankhurst in Moscow (Newbold is 2nd from left)
