= David Ramsay (communist) =

British communist politician (1883–1948)

David Ramsay (1883–1948) was a British communist activist.

== Biography ==
Born in Edinburgh, Ramsay became a patternmaker and joined the Amalgamated Society of Engineers. He then joined the Social Democratic Federation and its successor, the British Socialist Party (BSP). By the start of World War I, he was in the Socialist Labour Party (SLP) and had relocated to Leicester. He became a fervent opponent of the war, and was fined £100 in 1916 for trying to prevent recruitment into the Army.

The SLP was heavily involved in the Clyde Workers' Committee, and while Ramsay did not succeed in starting such a movement in Leicester, he supported similar initiatives across the country. He was treasurer of the Shop Stewards' and Workers' Committees organisation, within which he led efforts to organise the unemployed and ex-servicemen. In 1919, police alleged that he had given a seditious speech, advocating using machine guns to start a revolution. Ramsay denied the details, claiming that words had been added to his speech, but he was nonetheless jailed for five months.

Ramsay supported the October Revolution and was treasurer of the Hands Off Russia movement. He was involved in negotiations to form the Communist Party of Great Britain (CPGB), and was one of the leading opponents of attempts to affiliate the CPGB to the Labour Party.

In 1920 he was a representative of the Shop Stewards Movement who attended the 2nd World Congress of the Communist International in Moscow, along with other British delegates such as John S. Clarke, Helen Crawfurd, Willie Gallacher, William McLaine, JT Murphy, Tom Quelch, Jack Tanner, Marjory Newbold, and Sylvia Pankhurst. In order to attend, Ramsay had to obtain a passport under a cover story that he wished to emigrate to Argentina and, before doing so, must visit relatives in Norway (actually a Bolshevik based there). His request was taken to the Home Secretary, who consulted colleagues but surprisingly decided to grant it. Following the Congress, Ramsay stayed in the Soviet Union for a while, working for the Comintern and engaging in international travel.

Once Ramsay returned to the UK, he served on the CPGB's Central Committee, and worked as a Party instructor and propagandist. In 1926, he was named its Scottish Organiser, and was also the election agent for Harry Pollitt in Seaham in the 1929 general election.

MI5 kept Ramsay under constant surveillance, believing he may have been spying for the Soviet Union. According to intelligence files released to the National Archives, Ramsay dropped out of the Party in 1932 and found work as a courier for the Soviet embassy. But at a 1950 event marking the 30th anniversary of the CPGB, Harry Pollitt suggested, during a eulogy for Ramsay, that his late comrade's resignation from the Party in 1932 was merely a ploy to deflect secret service attention.
