= Lismer =

Lismer is a surname. Notable people with the surname include:

- Arthur Lismer (1885–1969), English born-Canadian painter

- Lismer (crater), Moon crater named after him

- Ted Lismer (1883–1947), British trade unionist and political activist
