= Shop Stewards Movement =

Early 20th century labour movement in the UK

The Shop Stewards Movement was a movement that brought together shop stewards from across the United Kingdom during the First World War. It originated with the Clyde Workers Committee, the first shop stewards committee in Britain, which campaigned against the imprisonment of three of their members in 1915. Most of the committee members belonged to the Amalgamated Society of Engineers (ASE). In November 1916 the Sheffield Workers' Committee was formed when ASE members there went on strike against the conscription of a local engineer. The government brought the strike to an end by exempting craft union members such as ASE engineers from military service. However, when the policy was reversed in May 1917, it was met by a strike involving 200,000 workers in 48 towns. The Shop Stewards Movement arose as a result of organising that strike.

In 1917, a National Administrative Committee was established for what was named the Shop Stewards' and Workers' Committees. George Peet of the Manchester-based Joint Engineering Shop Stewards' Committee was elected as secretary, while Arthur MacManus of the Clyde Workers' Committee was chair, and J. T. Murphy from the Sheffield Workers' Committee was assistant secretary. Two months after the formation of the committee, it merged with a movement for the amalgamation of engineering unions, which had been founded in 1915 but had achieved little during the war. The organisation supported the October Revolution, and Peet represented it on the committee of the Hands Off Russia campaign.

The Shop Stewards Movement became less active by 1920, when Willie Gallacher, David Ramsay, Ted Lismer and J. T. Murphy organised a national conference, where it was agreed to affiliate to the Communist International (Comintern). Gallacher, Murphy, Ramsay and Jack Tanner represented the shop stewards at the Second World Congress of the Comintern held later in the year, but affiliation was not permitted on the grounds that the group was not a political party. Gallacher rejected suggestions that the movement should affiliate to the International Trade Union Council, a recently formed federation of communist trade unions, arguing that it was necessary for members to remain active within mainstream trade unions. Instead, in September, a compromise was agreed: the movement would affiliate to the Red International of Labour Unions, while individual members who also held membership in the new Communist Party of Great Britain would come under the discipline of that group.

The Shop Stewards' and Workers' Committee became part of the National Workers' Committee in 1921, and it agitated unsuccessfully for a general strike on Black Friday. The National Workers' Committee in turn merged with the British Bureau in 1922, with Peet remaining joint secretary for a year. After which, the Comintern ordered that Gallacher and J. R. Campbell must replace Peet and Lismer among the leaders of the movement.
