= John McBain =

John McBain may refer to:

- John McBain (musician) (born 1965), American musician
- John McBain (One Life to Live), character on the American soap operas One Life to Live and General Hospital
- Jock McBain (1882–1941), Scottish trade unionist and political activist

== See also ==
- John Bain (disambiguation)
