= Jessie Fergusson =

Scottish suffragette

Jessie Fergusson was a Scottish suffragette. She played an active role in the rent strike and was the secretary of the Glasgow branch of The Worker's Suffrage Federation when it first was established.

== Activism ==
Fergusson was one of the leaders behind the rent strike in Glasgow in 1915. Before the strike, Glasgow Women's Housing Association had been formed, which Fergusson was an active part of. The strike was efficient. It resulted in the Rent Restriction Act, which said that the rent could not be increased from the 1914 levels unless the standard of the property was increased.
