= Anyte =

Hellenistic poet

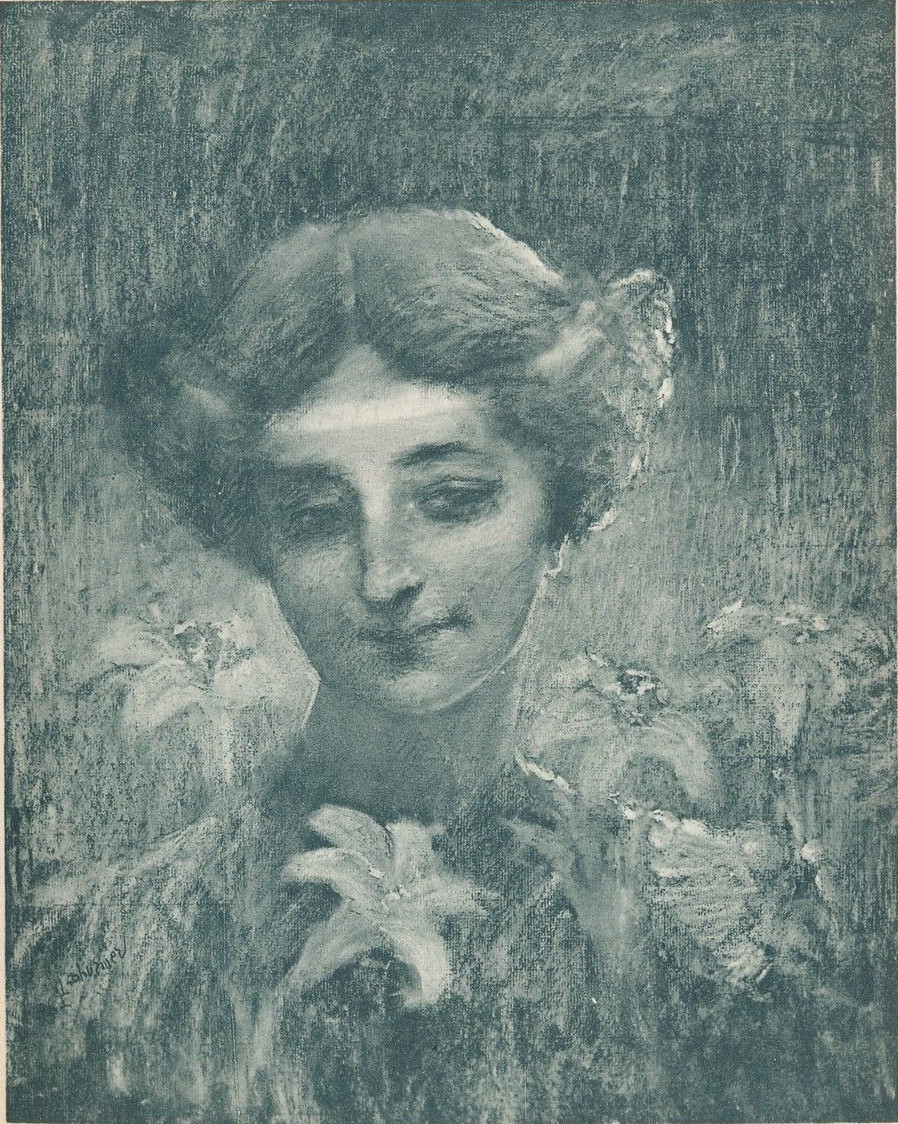
Illustration of Anyte by Lucien Lévy-Dhurmer, for Renée Vivien's Les Kitharèdes

Anyte of Tegea (Ancient Greek: Ἀνύτη; fl. c. 300 BC) was a Hellenistic poet from Tegea in Arcadia. Little is known of her life, but twenty-four epigrams attributed to her are preserved in the Greek Anthology, and one is quoted by Julius Pollux; nineteen of these are generally accepted as authentic. She introduced rural themes to the genre, which became a standard theme in Hellenistic epigrams. She is one of the nine outstanding ancient women poets listed by Antipater of Thessalonica in the Palatine Anthology. Her pastoral poetry may have influenced Theocritus, and her works were adapted by several later poets, including Ovid.

== Life ==
No reliable information about Anyte's life survives, and she can only be approximately dated by the style of her work. Based on this, and on possible imitations of her works in the second half of the third century BC, she is generally thought to have been active around 300 BC. According to Julius Pollux, writing in the second century AD, she was from Tegea in Arcadia. An alternative tradition, recorded in the Greek Anthology, claimed that Anyte was from Mytilene on Lesbos. Anyte's use of a Doric dialect, and mentions in her poem of Tegea and the Arcadian god Pan, suggest that a Tegean origin is more likely, though Pollux may have simply assumed this on the basis of Anyte's mention of Tegea. The story of a Lesbian origin was likely a later invention to link Anyte to Sappho.

Only one story about Anyte's life is preserved. Pausanias claims that she was once visited by the god Asclepius while she was asleep, and told to go to Naupactus to visit a certain blind man there. On doing so, the man was cured, and he built a temple to Asclepius. Marilyn B. Skinner suggests that Anyte in fact wrote a hymn to Asclepius, and that Pausanias' anecdote is a "garbled testimony" of that poem. Though little is known about Anyte's life, more of her poetry survives than any other ancient Greek woman, with the exception of Sappho.

== Poetry ==
Twenty-five epigrams attributed to Anyte in antiquity survive, one quoted by Julius Pollux and the remainder in the Palatine or Planudean Anthology. Of these, nineteen are generally agreed to be by Anyte. Of the remaining six, four are attributed to both Anyte and another author in either the Palatine or Planudean Anthology, (Note: AP 7.190 is attributed to Anyte or Leonidas in both the Palatine and Planudean Anthology. AP 7.189, 7.232, and 7.236 are all attributed to Anyte in the Planudean Anthology but to Aristodicus, Antipater of Sidon and Antipater of Thessalonica respectively by the Palatine.) and two epigrams are attributed to Anyte by the Palatine Anthology, but are included without an author named in the Planudean. (Note: AP 7.492 and 7.538) Of these six uncertain poems, two (AP 7.190 and 7.232) are considered possibly or probably by Anyte; the others are generally doubted. (Note: Jane McIntosh Snyder also accepts 7.538 as "probably" by Anyte.) It is likely that Anyte compiled a book of her poetry from her epigrams – she may have been the first to do so. The Greek Anthology twice refers to her as "the lyric poet", and Pausanias mentions her epic poetry, but neither lyric nor epic poetry by Anyte survive.

παρθένον Ἀντιβίαν κατοδύρομαι, ἇς ἐπὶ πολλοὶ
νυμφίοι ἱέμενοι πατρὸς ἵκοντο δόμον,
κάλλευς καὶ πινυτᾶτος ἀνὰ κλέος: ἀλλ᾽ ἐπὶ πάντων
ἐλπίδας οὐλομένα Μοῖρ᾽ ἐκύλισε πρόσω.

— Anyte 6 = AP 7.490
Translation:

I mourn the virgin Antibia, through the fame of whose beauty and wisdom
Many eager young men came to her father's house. Fate, the destroyer, rolls hope far away from all.

— Richard Aldington, "Antibia"

Anyte's poetry is composed in a mixed dialect, with elements of Doric and epic language, as well as some Atticisms; it was common for Hellenistic poets to deliberately mix dialects in this way. It is often interested in women and children, and Kathryn Gutzwiller argues that it was deliberately composed in opposition to traditional epigrams, which were by anonymous authors and from a masculine and urban perspective. Accordingly, of five epitaphs written by Anyte which survive, only one marks the death of a young man, as was traditional in the genre; the remaining four all commemorate women who died young. She is most famous for her epitaphs for animals and pastoral epigrams describing idyllic landscapes. Two dedicatory epigrams by Anyte also survive.

Anyte's poetry was, like that of her contemporaries, highly allusive, particularly referencing Homer. She imitates the structure and syntax of Homer's poetry, making use of Homeric vocabulary to write about personal and domestic themes. For instance, Anyte's epigram 6, an epitaph dedicated to the unmarried Antibia, repeatedly echoes phrases from the Iliad and Odyssey. She also echoes Homer in her frequent use of compound adjectives, such as her description of the poikilodeiros ("with a neck of many colours") snake in epigram 10. Her work references Hesiod, archaic Greek lyric and Attic drama, and shows evidence that she was familiar with the epigrams of Simonides of Ceos and Anacreon. Several of her epigrams allude to the works of Erinna, a female poet of the early Hellenistic period.

== Reception ==
Anyte's pastoral poems and epitaphs for pets were important innovations, with both genres becoming standards in Hellenistic poetry. Her pastoral works may have influenced Theocritus, and both Ovid and Marcus Argentarius wrote adaptations of her poems; the epigrammatist Mnasalces produced an epigram collection in imitation of Anyte. An epigram by Posidippus on the death of a young woman references one of Anyte's poems as well as Sappho and Erinna. Mary Maxwell suggests that the style of the Augustan poet Sulpicia was influenced by Anyte and her contemporary, Nossis. Antipater of Thessalonica lists her in his canon of nine women poets. According to Tatian, statues of Anyte were sculpted by Cephisodotus and Euthycrates.

At the beginning of the twentieth century, Anyte's poetry was highly thought of by the Imagist poets. Richard Aldington described her in his translation of Greek and Latin poetry as the "woman-Homer", and her work was praised by H.D., who adapted one of Anyte's epigrams in her poem "Hermes of the Ways". Modern scholars have been more critical of Anyte's work, considering her subjects frivolous. However, Josephine Balmer describes her poetry as "stunning", and argues that it demonstrates both education and technical skill. She is one of the women included on Judy Chicago's Heritage Floor, is represented in Anselm Kiefer's series Women in Antiquity, and has a crater on Mercury named after her.

== Works cited ==
- Aldington, Richard (1921). Medallions in Clay. New York: Alfred A. Knopf.
- Balmer, Josephine (1996). Classical Women Poets. Newcastle Upon Tyne: Bloodaxe Books. ISBN 978-1-85224-342-5.
- Barnard, Sylvia (1978). "Hellenistic Women Poets". The Classical Journal. 73 (3): 204–213. JSTOR 3296687.
- Bowman, Laurel (2004). "The 'Women's Tradition' in Greek Poetry". Phoenix. 58 (2): 1–27. doi:10.2307/4135194. JSTOR 4135194.
- "Amyte". Brooklyn Museum. Archived from the original on 20 December 2021.
- Collecott, Diana (1999). H.D. and Sapphic Modernism: 1910–1950. Cambridge: Cambridge University Press. ISBN 0521550785.
- Degani, Enzo (2006). "Anyte". Brill's New Pauly. doi:10.1163/1574-9347_bnp_e126600.
- de Vos, Mieke (2014). "From Lesbos She Took Her Honeycomb: Sappho and the 'Female Tradition' in Hellenistic Poetry". In Pieper, Christoph; Ker, James (eds.). Valuing the Past in the Greco-Roman World.
- Fain, Gordon L. (2010). Ancient Greek Epigrams: Major Poets in Verse Translation. Berkeley: University of California Press. ISBN 978-0-520-26579-0.
- Geoghegan, D. (1979). Anyte: The Epigrams. Rome: Edizioni dell'ateneo & bizzarri.
- Greene, Ellen (2005). "Playing with Tradition: Gender and Innovation in the Epigrams of Anyte". In Greene, Ellen (ed.). Women Poets in Ancient Greece and Rome. Norman: University of Oklahoma Press. ISBN 978-0-8061-3663-9.
- Gutzwiller, Kathryn J. (1993). "Anyte's Epigram Book". Syllecta Classica. 4: 71–89. doi:10.1353/syl.1993.0005. S2CID 192160362.
- "Anselm Kiefer". Jesus College, Cambridge.
- Martin, A. (2021). "Ill-Fated Shields and Man-Slaying Spears: Anyte and Nossis on the 'Heroic Code' in Hellenistic Epigram". Akroterion. 66: 41–57. doi:10.7445/66--1032. S2CID 249082893.
- Maxwell, Mary (2002). "H.D.: Pound's Sulpicia". Arion: A Journal of Humanities and the Classics. 10 (2): 15–48. JSTOR 20163884.
- Plant, I. M. (2004). Women Writers of Ancient Greece and Rome: an Anthology. Norman: University of Oklahoma Press. ISBN 978-0-8061-3622-6.
- Skinner, Marilyn B. (2001). "Ladies' Day at the Art Institute: Theocritus, Herodas, and the Gendered Gaze". In Lardinois, André; McClure, Laura (eds.). Making Silence Speak: Women's Voices in Greek Literature and Society. Princeton, N.J.: Princeton University Press.
- Skinner, Marilyn B. (2005). "Homer's Mother". In Greene, Ellen (ed.). Women Poets in Ancient Greece and Rome. Norman: University of Oklahoma Press. ISBN 978-0-8061-3663-9.
- Snyder, Jane McIntosh (1991). The Woman and the Lyre: Women Writers in Classical Greece and Rome. Carbondale: SIU Press. ISBN 978-0-8093-3596-1.
- "Planetary Names: Crater, craters: Anyte on Mercury". USGS Astrogeology Science Center. Archived from the original on 20 December 2021.
- Vandiver, Elizabeth (2023). "'A Group of Ardent Hellenists': The Imagists, Greek Meter, and Making It New". In Tambakaki, Polina (ed.). Brill's Companion to Classical Reception and Modern World Poetry. BRILL. ISBN 978-90-04-52927-4.
