= John Bain =

John Bain may refer to:

- John Bain (footballer, born 1854) (1854–1929), Scottish-born English amateur footballer (Oxford University, England national team)
- John Bain (footballer, born 1923) (1923–2019), Scottish football player and manager (Ferranti / Meadowbank Thistle)
- John Bain (footballer, born 1946), Scottish footballer, see List of Bury F.C. players (1–24 appearances)
- John Bain (footballer, born 1957), Scottish-US football (soccer) player and coach
- John Bain (rugby union), Australian international rugby union player
- John Bain or TotalBiscuit (1984–2018), British game commentator and critic
- John J. Bain, headmaster of Oratory Preparatory School

== See also ==
- John Baines (disambiguation)
- John MacBain (born 1958), Canadian businessman and philanthropist
- John McBain (disambiguation)
