= Anguissola (crater) =

Crater on Mercury

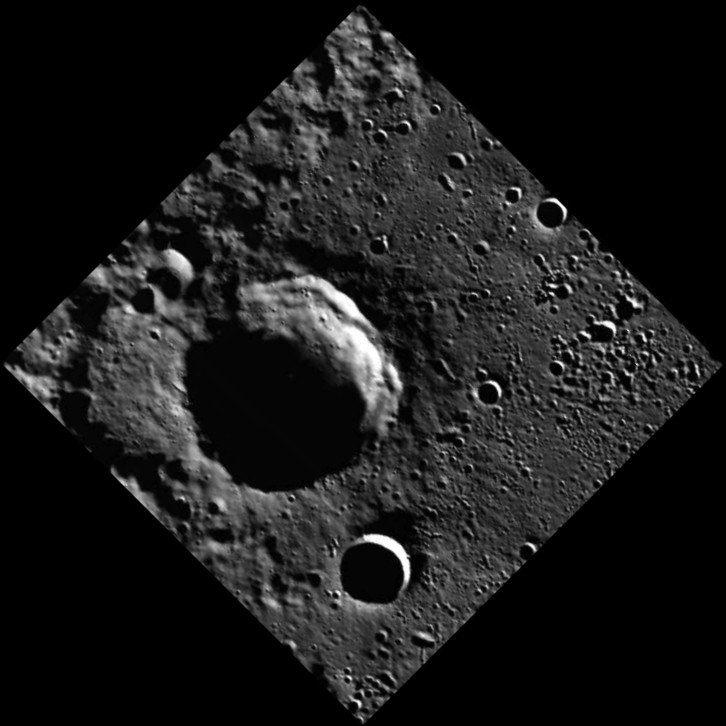
- MESSENGER WAC
- Feature type: Impact crater
- Location: Borealis quadrangle, Mercury
- Coordinates: 80.69°N 217.35°W
- Diameter: 35.41 km (22.00 mi)
- Eponym: Sofonisba Anguissola

Anguissola is a crater on Mercury. It has a diameter of 35.41 kilometres (22.00 miles). Its name was adopted by the International Astronomical Union (IAU) on August 4, 2017. Anguissola is named for the Italian painter Sofonisba Anguissola.

Anguissola lies on the western rim of the larger crater Henri. To the southeast is the smaller crater Anyte, nearer the center of Henri.

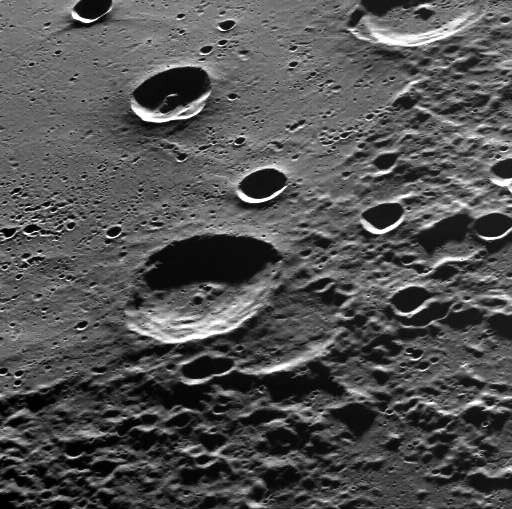
Anguissola is shown on the rim of the large crater Henri

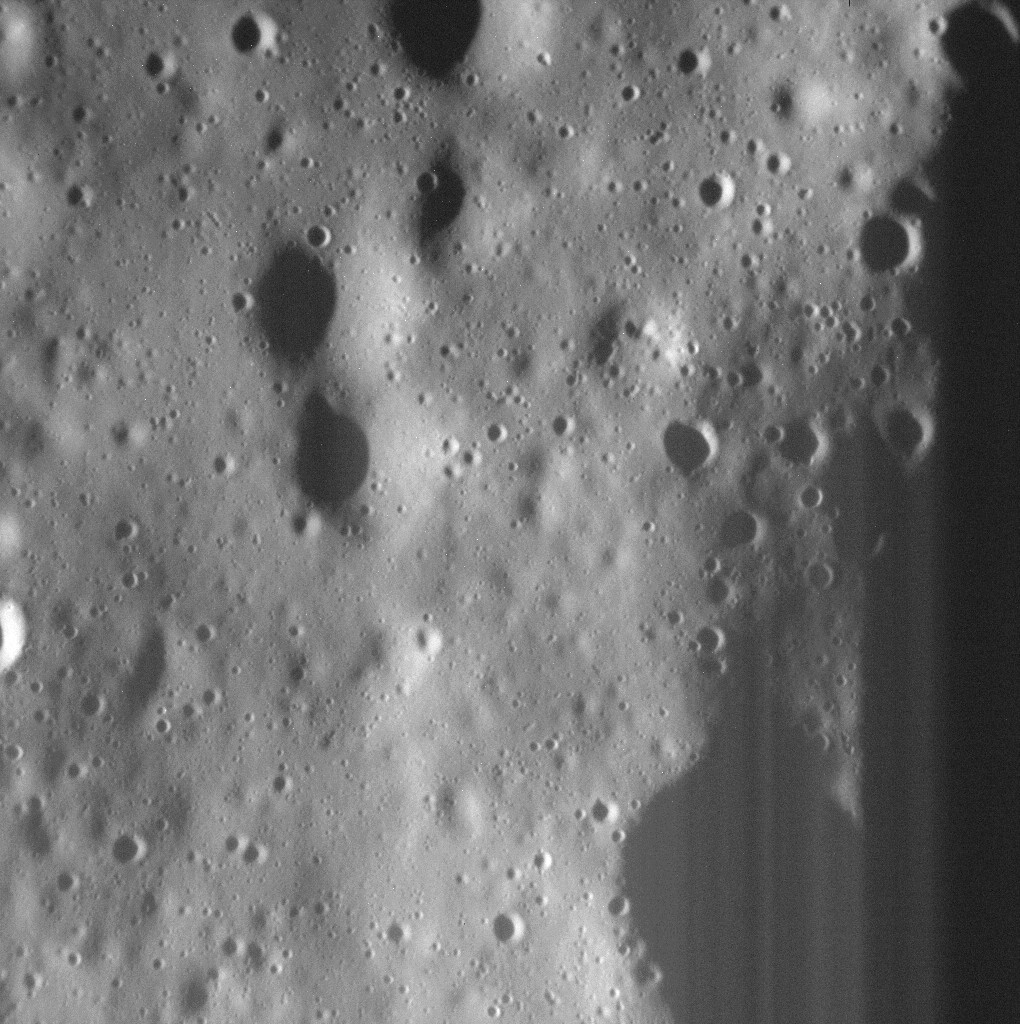
Anguissola crater rim. Image is about 6.7 km wide.
