= Helen Kerr =

Helen Louisa Kerr (née Howden; 9 March 1859 – 8 February 1940) was a Scottish social reformer.

== Life ==
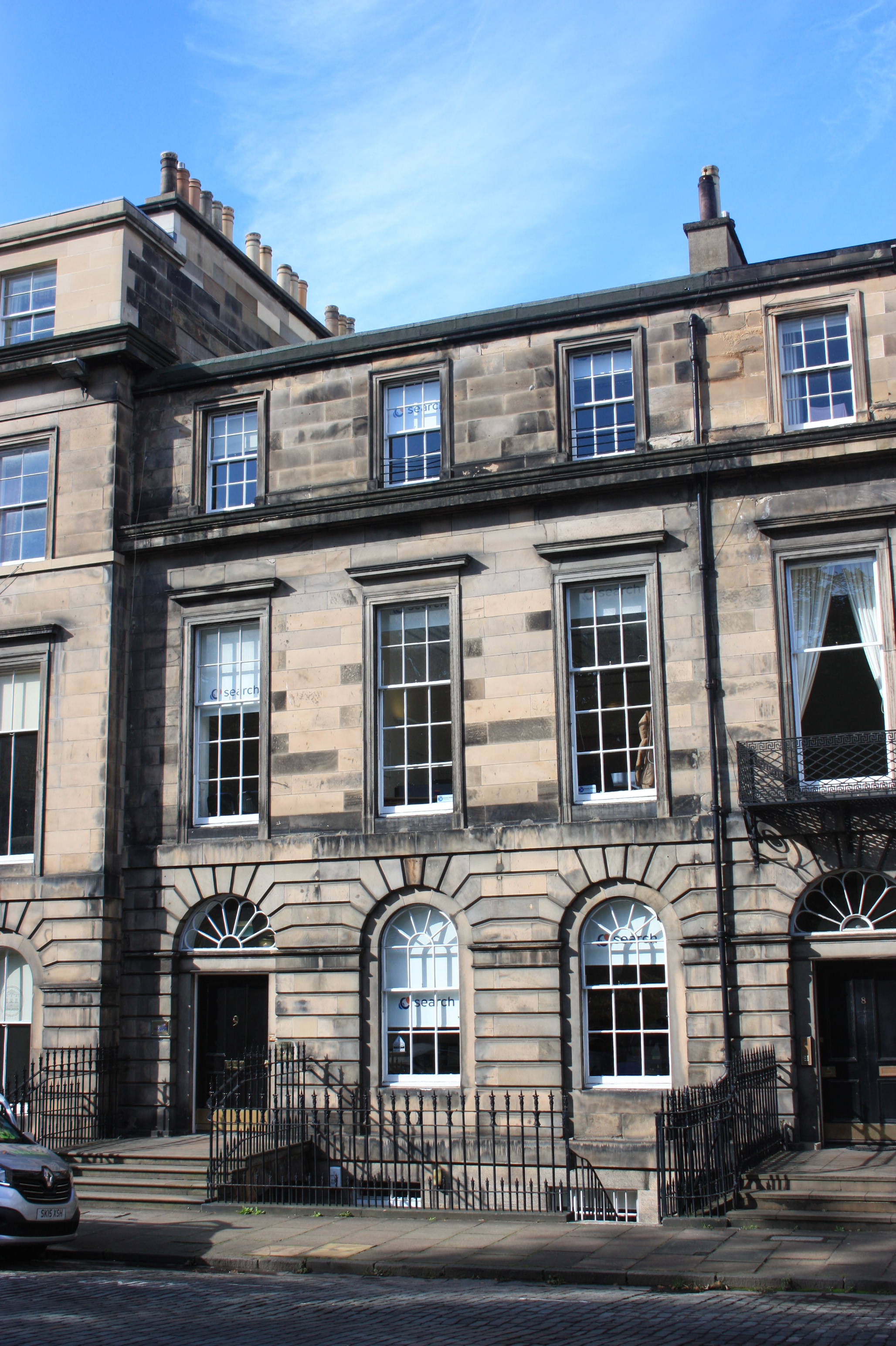
6 St Colme Street, Edinburgh

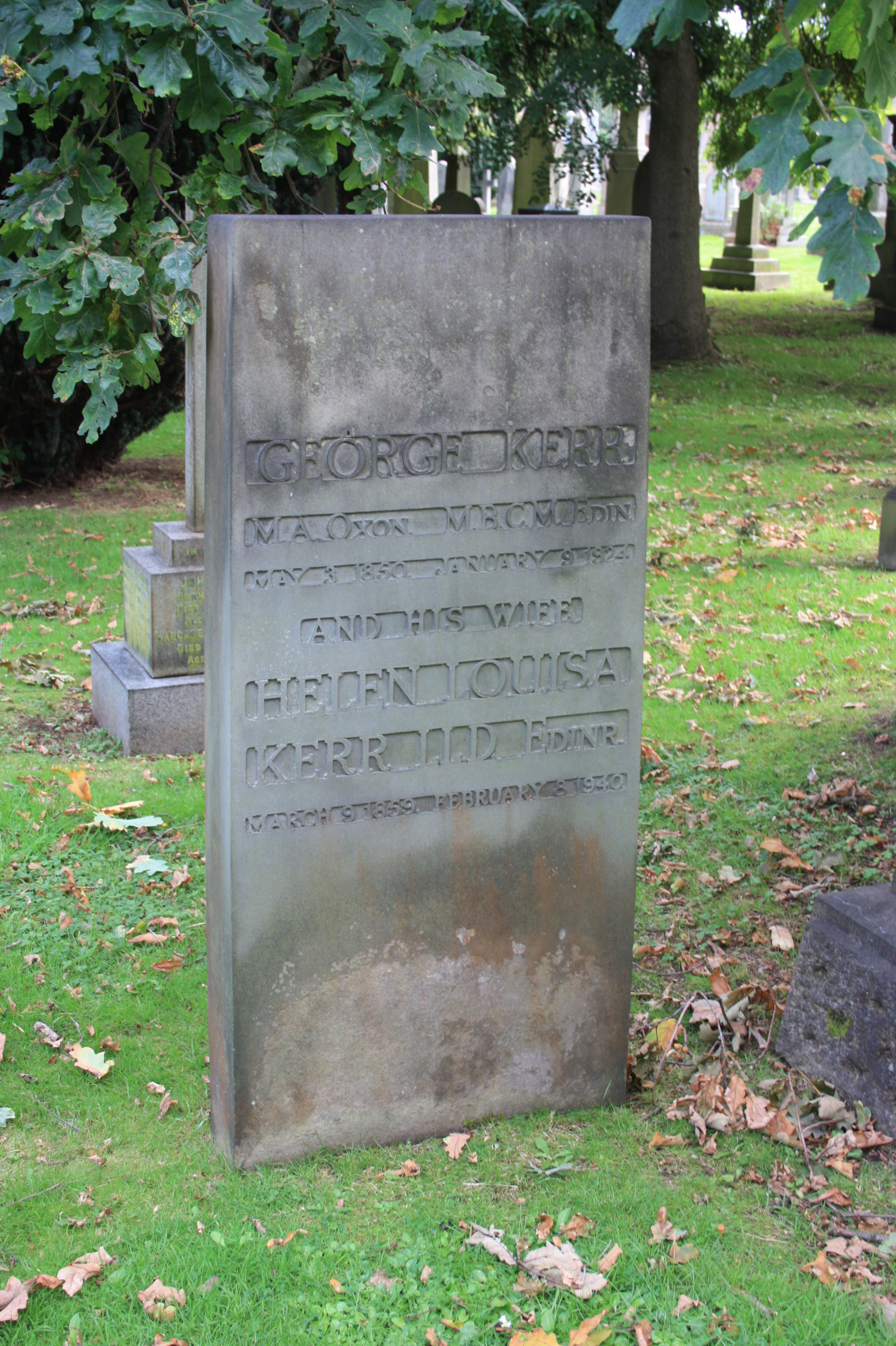
The grave of Helen Kerr, Dean Cemetery, Edinburgh

Helen Louisa Howden was born on 9 March 1859, the daughter of Mary Elizabeth Shaw Stewart and her husband, James Howden, a chartered accountant with Borthwick and Howden. The family lived at 90 Manor Place in Edinburgh's west end. In 1888, she married George Kerr in Corstorphine

She and her husband became involved in the Edinburgh Social Union (ESU), trying to provide affordable housing for students. They were closely linked to Patrick Geddes in these ventures. In 1896 they purchased 22 flats at Campbells Close in Edinburgh's Old Town. The town Council showed great confidence in the ESU handing over control of blocks at Tron Square, High School Yards, Potterrow and Portsburgh Square. By 1901 they controlled 24 blocks. In 1889 she took on the unusual role, for a woman at that time, as Superintendent of Housing. In 1902, she met with Octavia Hill to discuss social housing in Edinburgh.

In 1907, she submitted a report to the Royal Commission on the Poor Laws and Relief of Distress, then in 1912, she was appointed to the Royal Commission on the Housing Conditions of the Industrial Population of Scotland Rural and Urban. and was the only woman member. The previous Housing Conditions Commission in 1885 had had no women members.

The Women's Committee on House Planning in Scotland was chaired by Kerr in 1918. Its members included Mary Burns Laird and Catherine Hogg Blair.

The Committee had been established by the Secretary for Scotland, Robert Munro, with the purpose of inspecting houses and making recommendations from the housewife's point of view. In 1920, the University of Edinburgh awarded her an honorary doctorate (LLD) for her contributions to social reform.

From 1891, she lived at 6 St Colme Street, a large Georgian townhouse on the Moray Estate in western Edinburgh.

By the 1920s, she worked closely with Elizabeth Haldane, sister of Sir William Haldane, and Mary Maclagan in the improvement of housing across the UK. In 1921, she helped to establish the Nursing Committee at Edinburgh Royal Infirmary, and also helped to establish the Astley Ainslie Trust.

== Death ==
She died in Edinburgh on 8 February 1940, aged 80. She is buried with her husband facing "Lords Row" on the western edge of Dean Cemetery.

== Publications ==
- Social Conditions of Provincial Towns (1912)
- The Path of Social Progress (1912)

== Family ==
Kerr's husband George was a doctor who trained at the University of Oxford. The Kerr family were rich from Newfoundland fishing companies. The couple initially lived at Gogar House in Midlothian, west of Edinburgh.

Her sister-in-law, Mary Kerr, of 9 Great Stuart Street, was also involved in many of the ventures.
