= Tom Quelch =

British journalist (1886–1954)

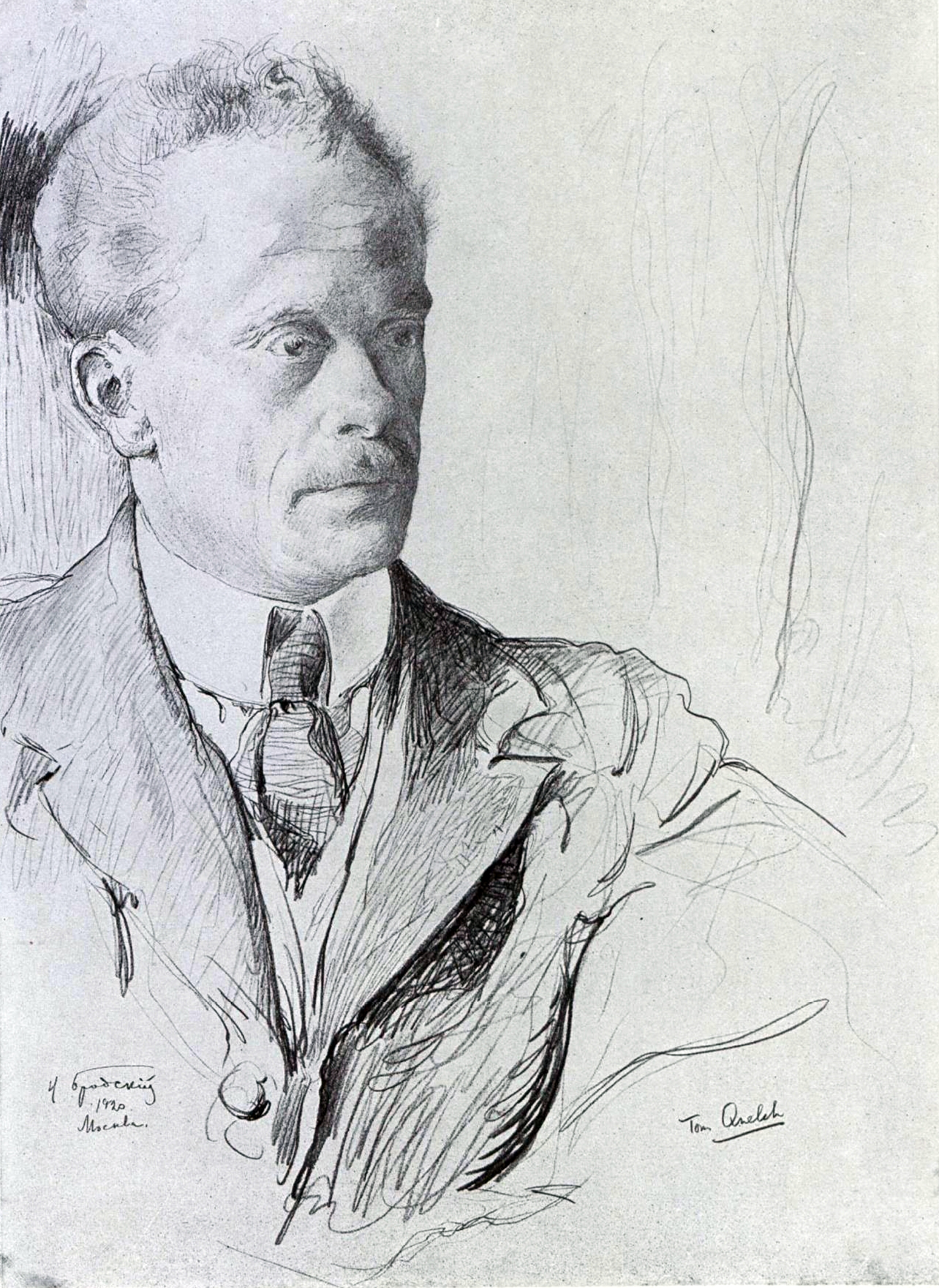
Tom Quelch (1920) portrait by Isaak Brodsky

Thomas Quelch (1886–1954) was a British journalist and the son of veteran Marxist Harry Quelch. a member of the British Socialist Party in the early part of the 20th century, becoming a communist activist in Great Britain in the 1920s.

Quelch joined the Social Democratic Federation (SDF), of which both his father, Harry, and his uncle, Lorenzo were members. The SDF formed the British Socialist Party (BSP), and Quelch came to attention in 1912 when he issued an appeal for soldiers to refuse to act as strikebreakers. This caused a Conservative MP, Oliver Locker-Lampson, to complain about him in the House of Commons. Quelch was involved in founding The Call in 1916, resisting attempts to turn the BSP into a Social Patriotic organisation at the outbreak of the First World War. However he was reluctant concerning the presence of African workers in the United Kingdom, raising concerns not merely that they might scab on strikes, but also that they might strike up sexual relationships with English women.

He was one of 13 conveners of the Leeds convention to hail the Russian Revolution, held on 3 June 1917, and was appointed a member of the Central Committee of the Council of Workers' and Soldiers' Delegates at the event.

Quelch was delegated with such as John S. Clarke, Helen Crawfurd, Williie Gallacher, William McLaine, JT Murphy, Sylvia Pankhurst, Marjory Newbold Dave Ramsay and Jack Tanner to attend the Second Congress of the Comintern and attended the Baku Congress of the Peoples of the East. He was elected to the Executive Committee of the Communist International, and also served on the Central Committee of the Communist Party of Great Britain (CPGB) from 1923 until 1925.

Quelch worked for the Union of Construction, Allied Trades and Technicians from 1924 until his retirement in 1953. He was living in Wimbledon, London in 1940, when he wrote to the Manchester Guardian with reminiscences of his meetings with Vladimir Lenin. A few years before his death, he resigned from the CPGB.

== Writings ==
- "Mendelism: A review" (review of R.C. Punnett Mendelism first published in Justice weekly newspaper of the Social Democratic Federation, SDF, in the United Kingdom), reprinted in Wilshire's Magazine (USA), vol. 11, August 1909.
- Review of William Morris' “The Revolt of Ghent”, Justice, 1 October 1910, p. 3
- 'The New Paganism', The New Review, June 1913, pp. 593–95.
- The War and Its Outcome, Justice, 17 September 1914, p. 4
- 'Parliamentarianism, Lenin and the BSP', The Call, 22 January 1920
- War or Peace?, The Call, No. 200, 5 February 1920
- (with William McLaine) Report as to the Communist Movement in Britain, The Communist International, June–July 1920, no.11-12, pp. 2241–46
- Print in Russia, The London Typographical Journal, Vol. XVI, No. 191 (November 1921), p. 10
- Opposition to the Social Revolution in Britain' The Communist International, 1921, No. 16-17, pp. 99–100
- The Trades Councils: The Need for the Extension of their Scope and Work, The Labour Monthly, Vol. 2, No. 3 (March 1922), pp. 238–50
- The Importance of Trades Councils, The Labour Monthly, Vol. 8, No. 5 (May 1926), pp. 313–7
- 'Foreword', The Militant Trades Council: A Model Constitution for Trades Council, 1926.

== Cultural impact ==
Tom Quelch is mentioned frequently but without detail in H G Wells' Russia in the Shadows. Wells used him as a cultural touchstone.
