= Ted Lismer =

English trade unionist and political activist (1883-1947)

Edward Lismer (1883 – 1947), commonly known as Ted Lismer, was a British trade unionist and political activist.

== Life ==
Ted was born in Sheffield, the eldest son of Edward Lismer, a draper and his wife Harriett. Ted's younger brother Arthur became a prominent artist in Canada. Ted trained as a mechanical engineer and, around 1902, joined the Steam Engine Makers' Society. In 1905, he joined the Independent Labour Party, but he was part of the minority who left in 1911 to join the British Socialist Party, resigning from this group in 1914. He became increasingly involved in trade unionism, and in 1912 was elected to the executive of the Sheffield Trades and Labour Council.

During World War I, Lismer was elected as the president of the Engineering Trades Amalgamation Committee, which sought to bring together shop stewards from across the engineering trades. This body was later renamed as the Sheffield Shop Stewards' and Workers' Committee, and he worked closely with J. T. Murphy to establish the movement on a national basis, linking up with the Clyde Workers' Committee and other local organisations to form the Shop Stewards' and Workers' Committees. In 1917, the Sheffield committee organised a major strike, in protest at the conscription of workers who had volunteered for munitions work in the factories. The strike spread nationwide, and led to meetings of 20,000 workers in Sheffield alone.

Lismer was a founder of the Sheffield branch of the Communist Party of Great Britain (CPGB) in 1920, and was also elected as vice chair of the Sheffield trades council. The following year, he was elected as the organising secretary of the new British Bureau of the Red International of Labour Unions, frequently working from Manchester. He was removed from this post in 1922, but instead became the organising secretary of the party's Sheffield district, and was placed on the Control Commission of the CPGB. In 1924, he moved to Manchester, but retained links with Sheffield, and was arrested there during the 1926 UK general strike.

Lismer entered an extramarital relationship, and in response, the CPGB removed him from his posts. He moved to Chelsea, and became active in the local Labour Party, while remaining broadly supportive of communism, and active in International Class War Prisoners Aid. He visited the Soviet Union, but otherwise lived in obscurity until his death in 1947.
