= SS Jolly George =

Cargo vessel

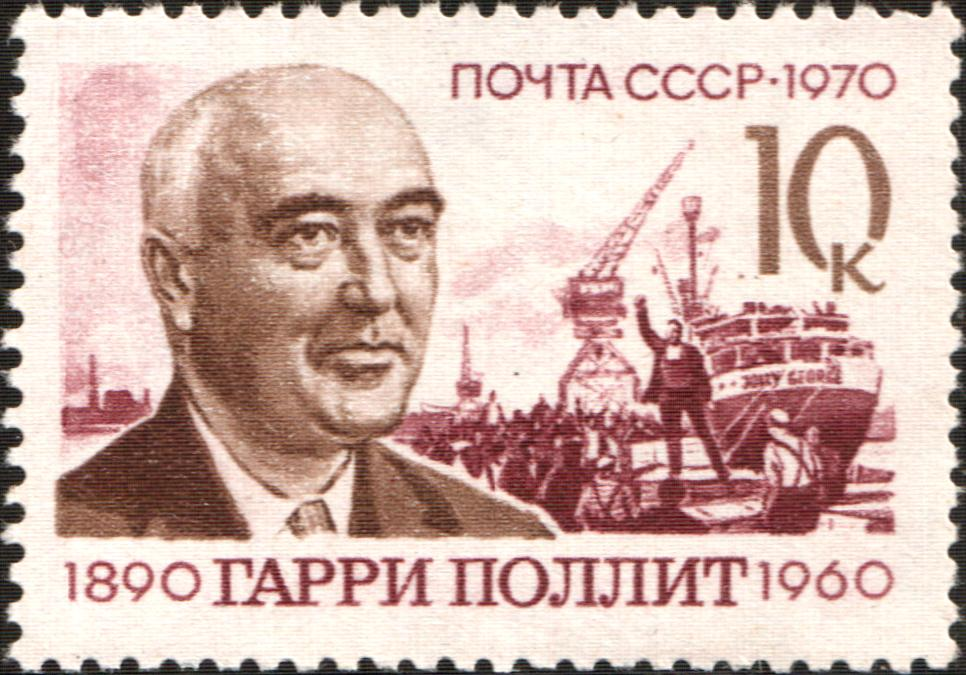
- A Soviet stamp depicting a dramatised version of Harry Pollitt's agitation against the loading of the SS Jolly George

History

United Kingdom
- Name: SS Jolly George
- Operator: Cia Maritima, Barcelona (1894-1898); Balboa Steamship Co Ltd (1898-1916); Entente Steamship Co Ltd (1916-1920); Walford Line Ltd (1920-1923); Barzilay & Benjamin (1923-1944); TC Munakalat Vekaleti Devlet Denizyollari ve Limanlari Isletme (1944-1951)
- Builder: Wood, Skinner & Co., Bill Quay, Newcastle-on-Tyne
- Launched: 30 August 1894
- Completed: November 1894
- Renamed: Balboa (1894-1920); Jolly George (1920-1923); Sebat (1923-1951)
- Fate: Broken up for scrap at La Spezia, 1951

General characteristics
- Class & type: Cargo vessel
- Tonnage: 1,336 GRT
- Length: 238.8 ft (72.8 m)
- Beam: 33.2 ft (10.1 m)
- Draught: 12 ft 6 in (3.81 m)
- Propulsion: 154nhp; single screw
- Speed: 9.5 kn (17.6 km/h; 10.9 mph)

SS Jolly George was a cargo vessel operated by Entente Steamship Co Ltd (AKA the Walford Line) during the period 1916-1923. She was originally launched as the Balboa in 1894, and renamed Jolly George in 1920. The ship was subsequently known as Sebat in Turkish service. The ship played a prominent role in carrying arms to Poland during the Polish-Soviet war.

== History ==
The ship was ordered from Wood, Skinner & Co. by the Cia Maritima company of Barcelona, Spain, and was built in Bill Quay on the Tyne. She was equipped with a 154 nominal horsepower engine supplied by North-Eastern Marine Engineering Co Ltd, Sunderland, and was launched as Balboa in 1894. In 1916 she was obtained by the Entente Shipping company (Leopold Walford Ltd), which later became known as the Walford line, and renamed Jolly George in 1920 . Her new name matched those of other ships operated by the Walford Line, including Jolly Angela, Jolly Bruce, Jolly Inez, and Jolly John.

In May 1920, whilst loading in the East India Docks of the port of London, the ship was the subject of an industrial dispute related to her cargo of weapons that were bound for Poland, then involved in the Polish-Soviet war against Soviet Russia. Stevedores involved in the loading of the ship noticed that she was being loaded with crates containing 18-pound artillery guns and ammunition which were marked "O.H.M.S. Munitions For Poland". Partly due to agitation by future communist party leader and one-time national organiser of the "Hands Off Russia" campaign Harry Pollitt, a deputation regarding the matter was sent by the dockers to Ernest Bevin, at the time a senior official in the docker's union. Bevin responded that the dockers would have union support if they refused to load or coal the ship. The ship's owners at the time, the Walford Line, were forced to acquiesce and the Jolly George sailed on 15 May 1920 without the offending weaponry.

In 1923 the ship was sold by the Walford line to the Turkish Barzilay & Benjamin line which renamed her Sebat. She continued in Turkish service until 1951 when she was sent to be scrapped. She arrived for scrapping at La Spezia, Italy on 27 July 1951, after more than 50 years of service.
