= Jock McBain =

Scottish trade unionist and political activist

John McKenzie McBain (27 August 1882 – 28 January 1941) was a Scottish trade unionist and political activist.

Born in Edinburgh, McBain grew up in Elgin before completing an apprenticeship in a foundry in Glasgow. He devoted his spare time to wrestling until an injury force him to quit the sport, and in 1906 he decided instead to focus on trade unionism. He joined the Associated Iron Moulders of Scotland and the Independent Labour Party (ILP), but Tom Bell convinced him to leave the ILP and join the Marxist Socialist Labour Party.

McBain was elected to the executive of the Associated Iron Moulders, and used his position to support the Clyde Workers' Committee during World War I. In 1916, most of the leading figures on the committee were imprisoned or deported, and McBain became one of its new leaders; however, during this period, it did little more than raise money to support those who had been deported. However, he worked with Bell and Jim Gardner to unionise workers in smaller Scottish foundries; a three-week unofficial strike achieved this end, and he sat on a committee representing shop stewards.

The Red Clydeside movement heated up again in 1919, when McBain was present at the Battle of George Square and received a head injury. He found his way to other David Kirkwood and Willie Gallacher, two former leaders of the Clyde Workers Committee who had also been injured, and convinced them to address the crowd, to encourage them to move to Glasgow Green.

McBain had campaigned for many years for the various foundry unions to unite, and this was largely achieved in 1920, when the Associated Iron Moulders became part of the new National Union of Foundry Workers (NUFW). Unfortunately for him, this led to him losing his job, and although he was a founder member of the Communist Party of Great Britain (CPGB), initially his involvement was in organising other unemployed workers.

The NUFW employed McBain as an organiser from 1922, and he devoted himself to the role. He also joined the National Minority Movement, and was the first chairman of the Glasgow Central Strike Co-ordination Committee during the 1926 UK general strike, although he was replaced by Peter Kerrigan after a few days. In 1928, he formed an unofficial Scottish district committee of the NUFW which prospered, despite the opposition of the union's leadership. He died, still in post, in 1941.
