= Anyte (crater) =

Crater on Mercury

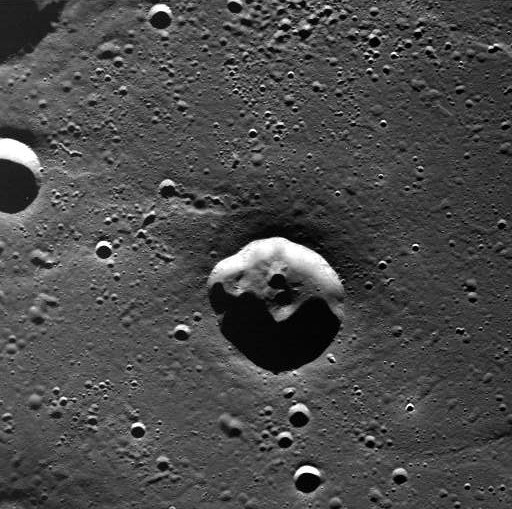
- MESSENGER WAC
- Feature type: Impact crater
- Location: Borealis quadrangle, Mercury
- Coordinates: 79.5°N 210.67°W
- Diameter: 20.92 km (13.00 mi)
- Eponym: Anyte of Tegea

Anyte is a crater on Mercury. It has a diameter of 20.92 kilometres (13.00 miles). Its name was adopted by the International Astronomical Union (IAU) on August 4, 2017. Anyte is named for the Greek poet Anyte of Tegea.

Anyte lies within the larger crater Henri. To the northwest is the crater Anguissola.

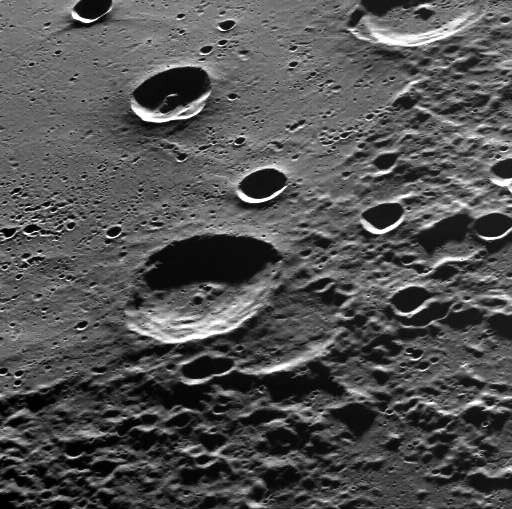
Anyte and Anguissola within the large crater Henri

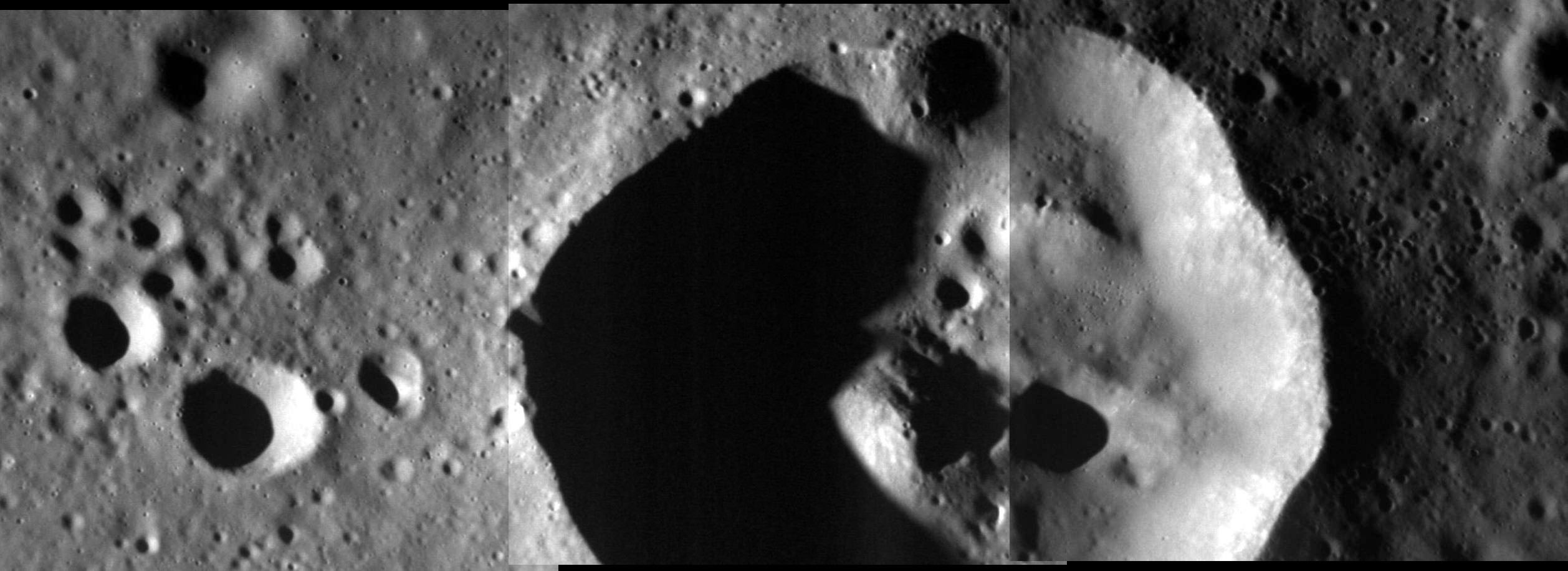
High-resolution mosaic
