= Henri (crater) =

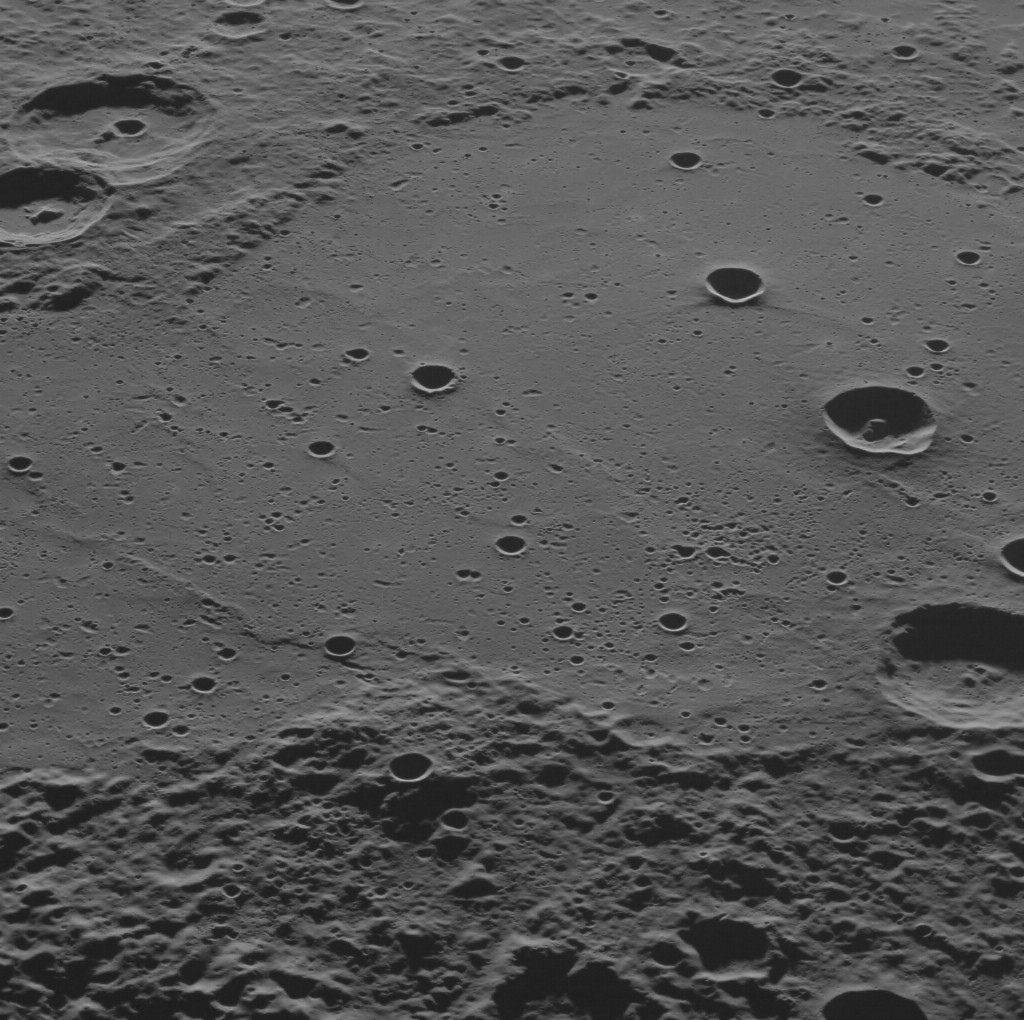
- MESSENGER WAC image of Henri
- Planet: Mercury
- Coordinates: 79.68°N 207.02°W
- Quadrangle: Borealis
- Diameter: 163.8 km (101.8 mi)
- Eponym: Robert Henri

Henri is a crater on Mercury. It has a diameter of 163.8 kilometres (101.8 miles). Its name was adopted by the International Astronomical Union (IAU) on April 24, 2012. Henri is named for American painter Robert Henri.

Henri is located within Mercury's large volcanic plain, Borealis Planitia. The smaller but similar crater Lismer is joined to Henri to the northeast. Both craters were flooded with lava during the formation of the plain 3.7 billion years ago. The craters Anyte and Anguissola lie within Henri.
