= Edward Murphy (cricketer) =

English cricketer, Royal Air Force officer, and medical doctor (1921–2020)

Personal information
- Full name: Edward Gordon Murphy
- Born: 6 December 1921; Sheffield, Yorkshire, England
- Died: May 2020 (aged 98); Clarkson, Mississauga, Ontario, Canada
- Batting: Right-handed
- Bowling: Right-arm medium

Career statistics
Competition	First-class
Matches	2
Runs scored	24
Batting average	11.00
100s/50s	–/–
Top score	11
Catches/stumpings	1/–
- Source: Cricinfo, 7 March 2019

Edward Gordon Murphy (6 December 1921 – May 2020) was an English first-class cricketer, Royal Air Force officer and medical doctor.

== Background ==
Edward Gordon Murphy was born on 6 December 1921 at Sheffield, England, United Kingdom. He was the son of the trade unionist and Communist J. T. Murphy and his wife, Ethel "Molly" Morris. His father's political activities took the family to Minsk in the Byelorussian SSR in 1926. Controversially, his parents had placed him in the fee paying public school Bedales in Hampshire in 1928, which was popular with Fabians. His parents hoped placing him in a fee paying school would improve his prospects. After completing his education at Bedales, Murphy went up to the University of London where he studied medicine, graduating in 1945.

== Career ==
Murphy was commissioned into the Medical Branch of the Royal Air Force as a flying officer in December 1946. He was promoted to the rank of flight lieutenant in November 1947.

While serving in the Royal Air Force, Murphy played two first-class cricket matches for the Combined Services cricket team in 1948. The first of these came against Worcestershire at Worcester, with his second appearance coming against Gloucestershire at Gloucester. He scored 24 runs in these two matches, with a high score of 11.

He and his wife Nadia moved to Canada in 1950. He worked as a doctor in Field, British Columbia, and Moose Jaw, Saskatchewan, before moving to Toronto. He specialised in paediatric neurology, and was on the senior staff of the Hospital for Sick Children in Toronto and was associate professor at the University of Toronto.

== Personal life and death ==
Murphy was married to Nadia for 73 years; they had one son.

Edward Gordon Murphy died age 98 in May 2020.
