= Red Clydeside =

Era of political radicalism in Glasgow, Scotland

Red Clydeside was an era of political radicalism in Glasgow, Scotland, from the 1910s until the early 1930s. It also referred to the area around the city on the banks of the River Clyde, such as Clydebank, Greenock, Dumbarton and Paisley. Red Clydeside is a significant part of the history of the labour movement in Scotland and Britain as a whole.

Some newspapers of the time used the term "Red Clydeside" in a derogatory manner, to refer to the groundswell of popular and political radicalism that had erupted in Scotland. A confluence of charismatic individuals, organised movements, and socio-political forces gave rise to Red Clydeside, which had its roots in working-class opposition to Britain's participation in the First World War. The region had a long history of political radicalism dating back to the Society of the Friends of the People and the "Radical War" of 1820.

== 1911 strike at Singer ==
The 11,000 workers at the largest Singer sewing machine factory in Clydebank went on strike in March–April 1911, ceasing to work in solidarity with 12 female colleagues who were protesting against the reorganization of work processes. This reorganization involved an increase in workload and a decrease in wages. Following the end of the strike, Singer fired 400 workers, including Jane Rae, one of the women activists, as well as all strike leaders and purported members of the Industrial Workers of Great Britain, among them Arthur McManus, who later became the first chairman of the Communist Party of Great Britain between 1920 and 1922.

Labour unrest, particularly among women and unskilled labourers, greatly increased between 1910 and 1914 in Clydeside, with four times as many days on strike as between 1900 and 1910. During these four years preceding World War I, membership of those affiliated to the Scottish Trades Union Congress rose from 129,000 in 1909 to 230,000 in 1914.

== Anti-war activism ==
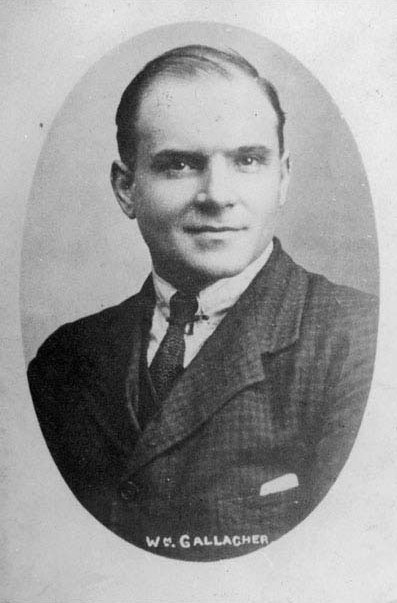
Willie Gallacher

To mobilise the workers of Clydeside against the First World War, the Clyde Workers' Committee (CWC) was formed, with Willie Gallacher as its head and David Kirkwood as its treasurer. The CWC led the campaign against the coalition governments of H. H. Asquith and David Lloyd George and the Munitions of War Act 1915, which forbade engineers from leaving the company they were employed by. The CWC met with government leaders, but no agreement could be reached, and consequently, both Gallacher and Kirkwood were arrested under the terms of the Defence of the Realm Act and jailed for their activities.

Anti-war activity also took place outside the workplace and on the streets in general. The Marxist John Maclean and the Independent Labour Party (ILP) member James Maxton were both jailed for their anti-war propaganda efforts.

Helen Crawfurd was opposed to conscription and, although there were anti-war and anti-conscription campaigns in organisations such as the Women's International League for Peace and Freedom being organised and run by middle-class women, few working-class women were involved in Scotland. Frustration on her part on their lack of representation, Helen Crawfurd organised a grassroots meeting called 'The Great Women's Peace Conference' involving socialist-minded women in June 1916. From this meeting, and alongside her fellow Rent Striker Agnes Dollan, The Women's Peace Crusade (WPC) arose in November 1916 in Govan, Glasgow. As intended, the organisation initially attracted working-class women in Govan to activism, and with open air meetings throughout Glasgow, Edinburgh and within Lowland Scotland they began to extend their reach. By 1917, street meetings were regularly being held all around the districts of Glasgow and beyond, including Partick, Maryhill, Bridgeton, Parkhead, Govan, Govanhill, Whiteinch, Shettleston, Springburn, Possilpark, Bellahouston, Rutherglen, Paisley, Overnewton Barrhead, Cambuslang, Blantyre, Alloa, Cowdenbeath, Drongan, Drumpark, Douglas Water and Lanark. As a further indicator of their success, a mass demonstration was organised by the WPC on Sunday 8 July 1917, in which processions marched to the sound of music and the flying of banners from two sides of the city to the famous Glasgow Green in the centre of the city. As the two streams of Crusaders approached the green they merged into a huge colourful and noisy demonstration of around 14,000 participants.

By the time that the Peace Crusade disbanded it had become a UK-wide organisation.

== Rent strikes ==
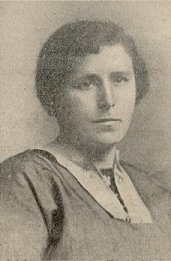
Mary Barbour

At the turn of the twentieth century, the Clydeside area in Glasgow experienced rapid industrial and population growth, during which time Glasgow became Scotland's largest city, as its population grew from almost 200,000 in 1851 to over 1,000,000 in 1921. Despite this significant growth, housing remained a huge problem for its inhabitants, as few houses were added to Glasgow's housing stock to accommodate the influx of immigrants from all over Scotland, other areas of Britain, and Europe. Eleven per cent of Glasgow's housing stock was vacant due to speculation, and few new houses were built as landlords benefited from renting out overcrowded and increasingly dilapidated flats. As Highlanders and Irish migrants came to Glasgow, the city's population increased by 65,000 people between 1912 and 1915, while only 1,500 new housing units were built. Glaswegian activists had demanded legislation and the building of municipal housing as early as 1885, when the Royal Commission on Housing for the Working Class noted the housing crisis. The Scottish Housing Council organised in 1900 and under pressure from trade unions the House Letting and Rating (Scotland) Act 1911 was passed. The act introduced letting by month, previously workers with unstable jobs had been forced to put up a year's rent payment. But as landlords increased rents protests by tenants became more frequent.

John Maclean of the British Socialist Party organised the Scottish Federation of Tenants' Associations in 1913 to fight against rent increases and championed public housing. In 1914 the Independent Labour Party Housing Committee and the Women's Labour League formed the Glasgow Women's Housing Association. Under the leadership of Mary Barbour, Mary Laird, Helen Crawfurd, Mary Jeff, Jessie Stephen and Jessie Fergusson the Glasgow Women's Housing Association became the driving force behind the rent strike that started in May 1915 in the industrialised area of Govan. Tenants refused to pay the latest increase in rents and staged mass demonstrations against evictions, resulting in violent confrontations. With the start of the First World War local young men left Glasgow to serve in the army overseas, and the first violent protest in the Govan district took place in April to resist the eviction of a soldier's family. As evictions were repeatedly attempted with support from the police, women attacked the factors and the sheriffs' men.

In early summer 1915, the rent strikers were supported by mass demonstrations and by August, the rent strikers had found widespread support in Glasgow. Rent strikes spread from heavily industrialised areas of the city to artisanal areas and slum areas. Strikes ignited in Partick, Parkhead, Pollokshaws, Pollok, Cowcaddens, Kelvingrove, Ibrox, Govanhill, St Rollox, Townhead, Springburn, Maryhill, Fairfield, Blackfriars, and Woodside. In October 1915, 15,000 tenants were on rent strike and a demonstration led by women converged on St Enoch Square. By November, 20,000 tenants were on rent strike as violent resistance against evictions continued. Trade unions threatened factory strikes if evictions supported by the police continued and following demonstrations on 17 November, legal action against rent strikers was halted. State Secretary of Scotland Thomas McKinnon Wood asked the Cabinet to freeze all rents at pre-war levels and in December, the Rents and Mortgage Interest Restriction Act 1915 received royal assent.

In March 2018, to mark International Women's Day, a bronze sculpture of Barbour was unveiled in Govan, Glasgow portraying Barbour leading a line of strikers.

== 40 Hour Strike ==
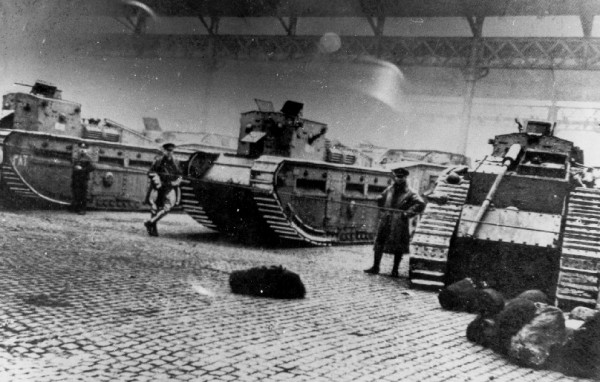
Medium Mark C tanks and government soldiers deployed to the city on 31 January 1919

The left-wing activities continued after the end of the war. The campaign for a 40-hour week, with improved conditions for the workers, occupied the exertions of organised labour. On 31 January 1919, a massive rally, organised by the trade unions, took place on George Square in the city centre of Glasgow. Although it has been claimed that as many as 90,000 people were present, contemporary sources suggest 20-25,000. Once again, although it is claimed that the Red Flag was raised in the centre of the crowd, this had in reality happened on Monday 27 January. The failure of the tram drivers to join the strike had led to growing hostility, and some of the strikers tried to block the tram traffic in the Square. Police attempts to clear the way led to violence and a series of baton charges. The Riot Act was read, and attacks were made on strike leader David Kirkwood as he exited the City Chambers.

The Sheriff of Lanarkshire, who had earlier checked that troops would be available if he needed them, called for military aid. Mainly Scottish and mainly veteran troops were sent from bases elsewhere in Scotland, and one battalion was sent up from the north of England. Claims that the troops were sent by the government, as well as claims that Scottish troops were locked in their barracks during the incident, are part of the extensive mythology surrounding the event. It was only fourteen months since the Russian Revolution, and the German Revolution was still in progress in January 1919. The troops started arriving at 10 pm that evening, after the violence was over. Six tanks arrived from Dorset on Monday, 3 February.

== Debate about it being a "revolutionary moment" ==
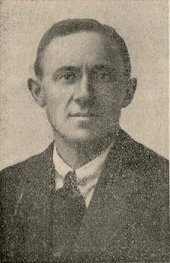
Manny Shinwell

There remains a debate on the left, over whether the Red Clydeside movement constituted a revolutionary opportunity for the working-class, though on the face of it, it would appear that the revolutionary potential of the Clydeside working-class has been exaggerated. Firstly, except Maclean, none of the labour leaders developed a class analysis of the war, nor did they seriously consider threatening the power and authority of the state. Furthermore, it was the behaviour of those conducting the war, not the war itself that provoked opposition within the labour movement. The Independent Labour Party's May Day Manifesto of 1918 makes this very clear in calling for A Living Wage for all and Justice for our Soldiers and their Dependants. Moreover, the massive demand for men to fight in the war meant that few Glaswegian families escaped personal loss of some kind. To undermine the war effort was to risk alienating the working-class, which many labour leaders were unwilling to do-–apart from Maxton, Gallacher and Maclean.

William Gallacher, who would later become a Communist MP claimed that, whilst the leaders of the rally were not seeking revolution, in hindsight they should have been. He claimed that they should have marched to the Maryhill Barracks and tried to persuade the troops stationed there to come out on the protesters' side.

The trade union leaders, who had organised the meeting, were arrested. Most were acquitted, although both Gallacher and Manny Shinwell were put in jail for their activities that day, Shinwell also being charged with an inflammatory speech the week before in James Watt Street in the city's docks, in an episode that later erupted into a race riot.

== "Reds" in Parliament ==
The ensuing 1922 general election saw the rise of Labour in the Clyde valley.

The aura of Red Clydeside grew as delegations of organised labour replaced the Liberal Party as the political formation most popular among the working class. This manifested itself at the 1922 general election, when several of the Red Clydesiders were elected to serve in the House of Commons (most of them Independent Labour Party members). They included Maxton, Wheatley, Shinwell, Kirkwood, Neil Maclean and George Buchanan.

According to the Labour Party, the Red Clydesiders were viewed as having a dissident left-wing character. Many of them, most notably Maxton and Wheatley, were great critics of the first and second Labour governments, elected in 1924 and 1929 respectively.

The Red Clydeside era still impacts upon the politics of the area today. Ever since, Glasgow has been known for political and industrial militancy. The Upper Clyde Shipbuilders Work In of 1971 offers a pertinent example. The Labour Party has been historically dominant in Glasgow where they held the vast majority of parliamentary seats until SNP gains in 2015 from where they held all seats (with the exception of Glasgow North East between 2017-2019) until their return to Labour in 2024.

This period in Glasgow's colourful past remains a significant landmark for those on the political left in Scotland. The story of the Red Clydesiders can still be politically motivating. At the 1989 Glasgow Central by-election, the Scottish National Party candidate Alex Neil called himself and the SNP member of Parliament for Govan at the time, Jim Sillars; the "new Clydesiders".

== Popular culture ==
The album Red Clydeside by Alistair Hulett and Dave Swarbrick contains nine songs about the movement, particularly the anti-war protests and the rent strike. The Red Clydeside movement was also featured in John McGrath's play Little Red Hen, performed by 7:84.
