= Glasgow Women's Housing Association =

Scottish tenants organisation

- Abbreviation: GWHA
- Formation: 1914
- Founded at: Glasgow, Scotland
- Type: Non-governmental organisation
- Purpose: campaigned for subsidised housing; opposing profiteering by landlords; challenged the lack of municipal housing due to speculative urban development
- Methods: Rent Strikes; marches and speeches, protest leaflets and latterly engagement with the legislative process
- Key people: Mary Burns Laird, Mary Barbour, Agnes Dollan, Helen Crawfurd, Jessie Ferguson

Glasgow Women's Housing Association (GWHA) was established in Glasgow, Scotland, in mid-1914 by the Independent Labour Party Housing Committee launched by Andrew McBride in 1913 and the Women's Labour League in reaction to the increasing rent prices and overcrowding exacerbated by the advent of the First World War.

The Women's Labour League which included Jessie Ferguson and Mrs Nixon among its members promoted the formation of housing associations in each ward of the city affiliated to the GWHA. GWHA was non-political but campaigned for subsidised housing and criticised profiteering by landlords and the lack of municipal housing provision due to speculative urban development. The GWHA were instrumental in the organisation of the Glasgow Rent Strike of 1915. and were described as a 'major pre-war organisational effort in support of the strikes'. As a result of the rent strikes the Rents and Mortgage Interest Restriction Act 1915 was passed.

Eventually GWHA assisted the improvement of the post war Housing, Town Planning, &c. Act 1919 for municipal social housing.

== Housing issues and rent strike ==
The majority of housing in Glasgow was in private hands, and in tenements: buildings with multiple occupants, a common stair or 'close' and toilet, with no internal sanitary facilities. The industrial growth in shipbuilding and men called to the war effort, as well as a rapid population growth had so increased demands on housing that landlords could raise rents on their tenements' remaining residents. Women who were often the main occupiers in practice, were faced with a rent increase of up to 25% and would be forcibly evicted by bailiffs if they failed to pay. As a result of this rent increase, there was a popular backlash against the landlords and a rent strike was initiated. The GWHA led the Glasgow Rent Strike of 1915 and at its peak the rent strike involved around 20,000 people, with the Glasgow women's influence extending to other working-class communities in the UK.

As a result of the rent strikes in Glasgow and elsewhere in Britain, the Rent Act of 1915 was passed.

Mary Burns Laird was GWHA first President and chaired the first meeting on 16 February 1915 in Govan's Morris Hall. Other key figures in establishing GWHA include Mary Barbour, Agnes Dollan who was the association's Treasurer, Helen Crawfurd, and Jessie Ferguson. Members of the GWHA were responsible for "violent attacks" against House Factors (agents of landlords who collected rent) who were evicting families, and successfully gained support from factory workers to aid Mary Barbour and the GWHA in demanding a return of money from the Factor.

The GWHA had 3,000 members by the end of 1915. The members used banners during their protests, an example of which read:

Our Husbands Sons and Brothers are Fighting the Prussians of Germany.

We are fighting the Prussians of Partick.

Only Alternative: Municipal Housing.

_{Banner at the Great March in St. Enoch's Square, Glasgow 7th Oct, 1915.}

The GWHA were actively involved in protests during the Red Clydeside. On 17 November 1915, a large protest march of women, and male shipbuilders and engineers went through Glasgow to the Glasgow Sherriff Court, which was where landlords were taking individual tenants to court to obtain eviction orders. In May 1917, the GWHA leaders spoke at a rally on Glasgow Green to an audience of over 70,000. One of the speakers, GWHA Treasurer Agnes Dollan was given a short prison sentence in 1917 for her actions in the rent strike. The GWHA methods were copied in cities all over the UK, for example Dundee, Aberdeen, Leeds, Bradford, Edmonton, Barrow, Workington, Coventry and Birmingham.

== Changes to town planning law ==
GWHA were eventually formally engaged directly with changing legislation through membership of the Secretary of State for Scotland's Scottish Women's Committee on House Planning during 1918. Thus GWHA contributed to the passing of the Housing and Town Planning Act of 1919, which mandated local governments to build housing for citizens and allocated the funds to do so.
