= Mary Burns Laird =

Scottish social activist (1864–1944)

- Born: 1864
- Died: 1944 (aged 79–80)
- Organization(s): Women's Labour League; Glasgow Women's Housing Association
- Known for: Social activism, women's housing rights and Glasgow Rent Strikes
- Political party: Labour Party (UK)
- Movement: Red Clydeside; Rent Strikes
- Partner(s): John Laird, shipbuilder's clerk
- Children: Annie, Mary, Robert
- Parent(s): Margaret Walker and Hugh Burns, deputy harbourmaster

Mary Laird (née Burns; died 1944) was a founding member and first President of the Glasgow Women's Housing Association, a President of the Partick Branch of the Women's Labour League, associated with the Red Clydeside movement, and supported the Glasgow Rent Strikes of 1915 alongside Mary Barbour, Agnes Dollan, Mary Jeff and Helen Crawfurd. Laird went on to participate in wider social activism for women and children's rights.

== Biography ==
Mary Burns Laird was born in 1864 to Margaret Walker and Hugh Burns, who were both born in Ireland. In 1884, she married John Laird, who was a ship builder's clerk. The wedding took place in Kinning Park, Glasgow. Laird was a sewing machinist. Her father, Hugh was a Deputy Harbourmaster at the time of her marriage. In the 1891 and 1901 censuses the family lived at Edward Street, Barony and in the 1911 census at Blantyre Road, Anderston. According to the 1911 census entry Laird and her husband, John had had six children, two of whom were still living. In the 1891 and 1901 censuses three children are listed: Annie, Mary and Robert.

== Evidence to the Royal Commission on Housing ==
Laird was a prominent Labour activist and patron of the Women's Labour League. In 1913, as a member of the Women's Labour League, she gave a prepared statement and then was a witness to the Royal Commission on the Housing of the industrial population of Scotland Rural and Urban. Her statement concerned objections to the single-apartment or one-roomed house as a home for married couples. In it she describes how difficult it is to observe the decencies of life in one room, particularly when a child is born or a member of the family dies.

The Royal Commission on Housing originated in 1909, when the Secretary for Scotland, Lord Pentland, directed the Local Government Board for Scotland to seek reports from county medical officers into the living conditions of miners; this being the result of a meeting with a deputation from the Scottish Miners Federation earlier that year. This eventually led to the Commission being established in 1912 by Lord Pentland's successor, the Right Honourable Thomas McKinnon Wood. Evidence was taken by a group of commissioners led by Sir Henry Ballantyne, which included Helen Kerr, from March 1913 until October 1915; the report was published in 1917 and the minutes of evidence not until 1921.

== Women's Housing campaign and rent strikes ==
In 1914, at the age of 50, Laird became one of the founders and first President of the Glasgow Women's Housing Association.

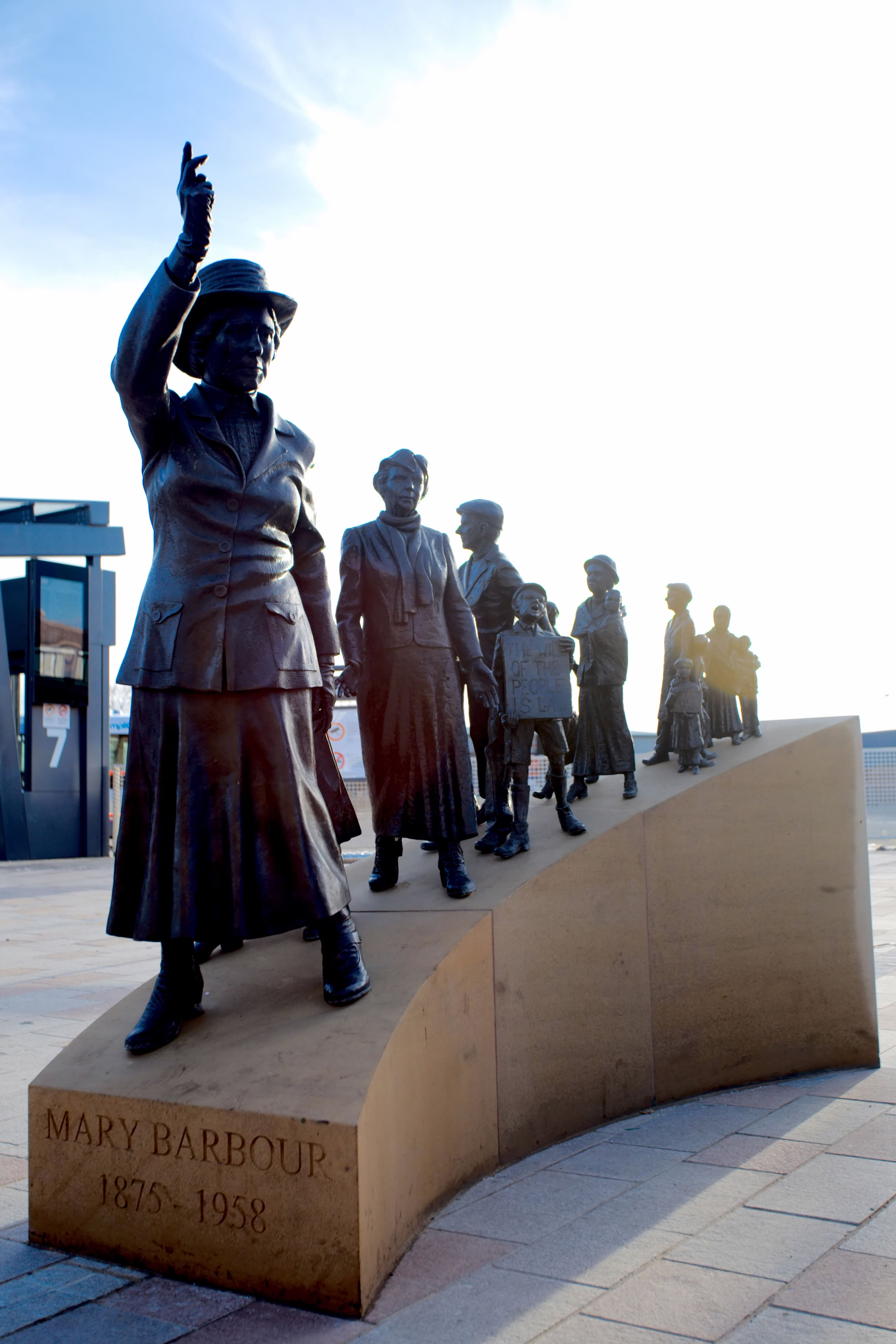
Mary Barbour Statue - Front view

The Glasgow Women's Housing Association was formed on the eve of the First World War in 1914 with support from the Women's Labour League and the Housing Committee of the Glasgow Labour Party, although the organisation was non-political in its membership and commitments. The organisation became a driving force in supporting the 1915 rent strike, and its formation has been described as the major 'pre-war organizational effort' in support of the strikes. In 1915 the Glasgow Women's Housing Association organised a number of meetings in Morris Hall on Shaw Street in Govan to protest rent increases across Glasgow. The first of these meetings, on 16 February, was chaired by Laird and addressed by John S. Taylor, Patrick Dollan and Harry Hopkins. Laird also played a prominent part in another meeting which took place in St Mungo's Halls. In her role as Chair of the Glasgow Women's Housing Association, Laird criticised tenement housing, stating that these were a challenge for housewives, advocating instead the establishment of "cottage homes".

== Social activism ==
A s well as her involvement in the 1915 Glasgow Rent Strikes, Laird spoke on housing issues in various locations-for example, in Milngavie in March of the same year, at the Co-operative Women's Guild on the subject of "the Housing Question". Laird's speech is quoted extensively in the local press, and includes details of the conditions that tenants had to contend with, such as 120,000 families in Glasgow being forced to stay in single-apartment flats due to high rents; also to the diseases such as rickets, measles etc which caused high mortality due to the cramped living conditions., and many of the other daily challenges which were faced. Laird continued by advocating social housing rather than for profit.

Laird became increasingly involved with the Labour Party and wider social activism. In 1915, the radical publication Forward urged that Laird be adopted as a municipal candidate for the Labour Party as a way of linking housing policy with a direct appeal to women voters. In November 1916, as president of the Partick Branch of the Women's Labour League she presided over a meeting protesting the high prices of food, the cause of which she stated was "profiteering organisations".

On May Day 1917, Laird spoke alongside, among others, Mary Barbour and Agnes Dollan, at a rally at Glasgow Green attended by 70,000 people. In April 1919, Laird was elected for Labour in School Board elections. As member for Hillhead and Partick, she served on a number of committees responsible for children's welfare.

Laird was appointed to the Women's Committee on House Planning in Scotland in June 1918. The Committee had been established by the Secretary for Scotland, Robert Munro with the purpose of inspecting houses built by the Local Government Board for Scotland for Ministry of Munitions and the Admiralty, and other housing schemes, and making recommendations from the housewife's point of view; its chair was Helen Kerr. The committee's report was published in October 1918. The women commented on the type and layout of the new houses, many built on Garden City lines, and visits included schemes at Rosyth, Inchinnan, Gourock and Greenock. Mary Laird was one of those who proposed in an addendum to the report that a proper standard of housing should be a duty and obligation of the state.

In 1922 Mary became Treasurer of the Scottish Labour Housing Association. She stood for election to the town council for Partick East in 1924, losing to the moderate candidate, Donald Fletcher then in 1926 she became a member of the Glasgow Trades Council.

== Death and legacy ==
Laird died in Prestwick in 1944, aged 81.
