= Lismer (crater) =

Crater on Mercury

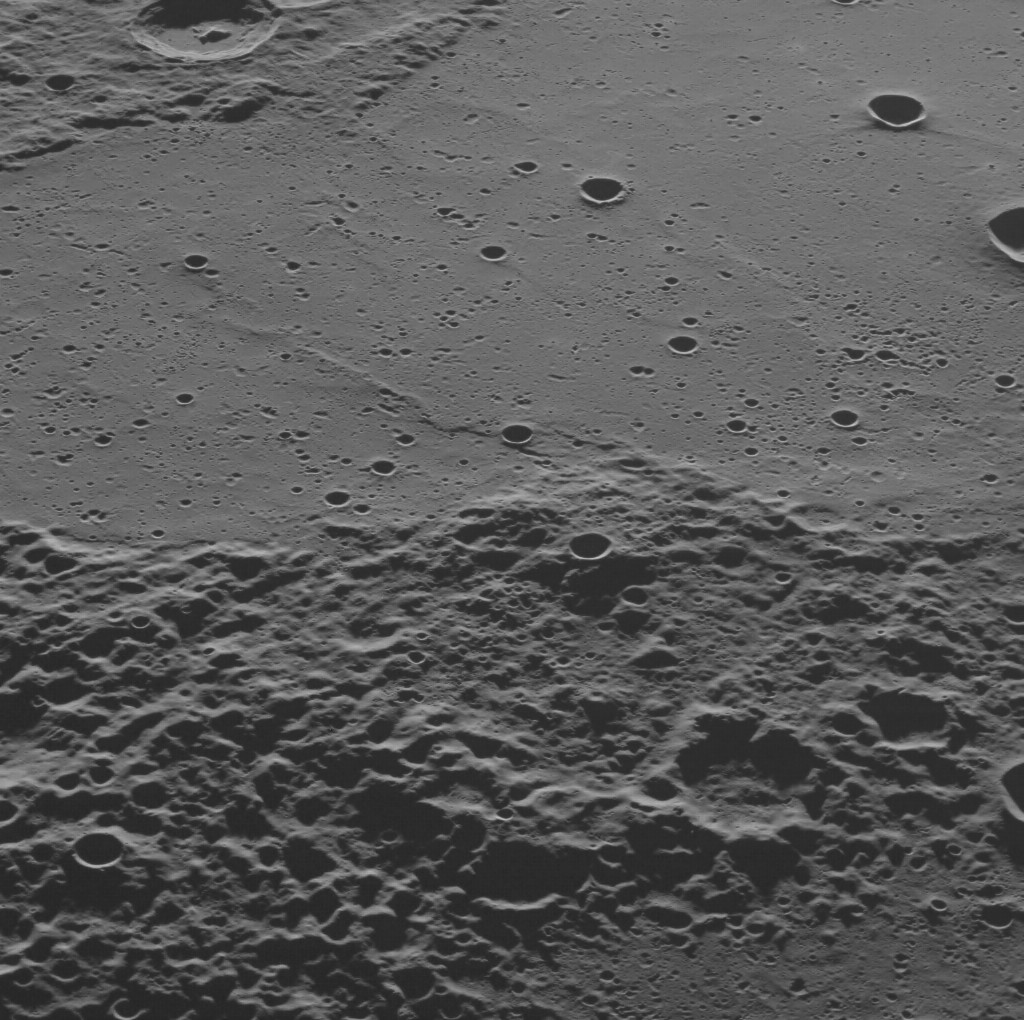
- MESSENGER WAC with Lismer at left and Henri at right
- Planet: Mercury
- Coordinates: 81.51°N 166.37°E
- Quadrangle: Borealis
- Diameter: 139.12 km (86.45 mi)
- Eponym: Arthur Lismer

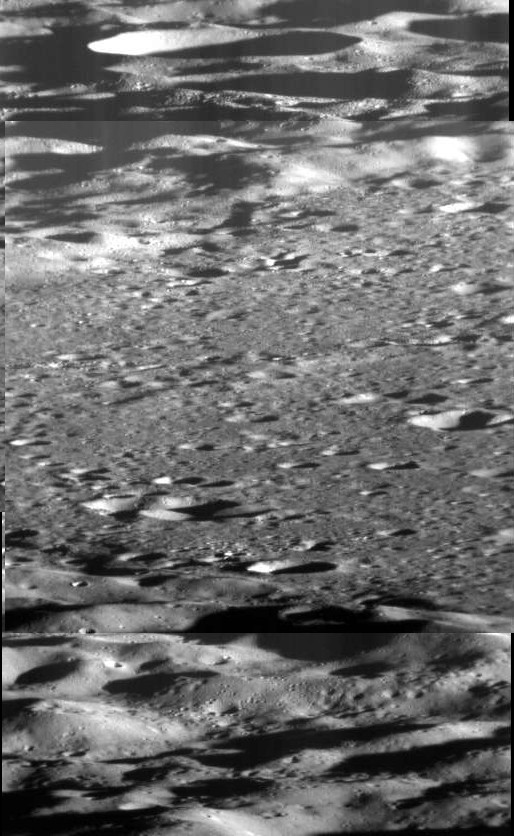
Oblique view of northern Lismer crater

Lismer is a crater on Mercury. It has a diameter of 139.12 kilometres (86.45 miles). Its name was adopted by the International Astronomical Union (IAU) on April 24, 2012. Lismer is named for the English-Canadian painter Arthur Lismer.

Located within Mercury's large volcanic plain, Borealis Planitia, Lismer is joined to the southwest to the larger but similar crater Henri. Both craters were flooded with lava 3.7 billion years ago during the formation of the plain.
