= Hands Off Russia =

International political initiative first launched by British Socialists in 1919

The Hands Off Russia campaign was an international political initiative first launched by British Socialists in 1919 to organise opposition to the British intervention on the side of the White armies against the Bolsheviks in the Russian Civil War, as well as to oppose support for Poland during the Polish-Soviet war. The movement was funded partly with financial support from the Bolsheviks themselves. Their most prominent success was in stopping the sailing of the SS Jolly George with munitions bound for Poland. The movement was encouraged by the fledgling Communist International and ultimately emulated in several other countries, including the United States, Canada, and Australia.

== History ==
=== Founding ===
The National Committee for the Hands off Russia Movement was elected at a conference in London in January 1919. Sylvia Pankhurst obtained funds for the movement from Moscow. Socialists like William Paul, W. P. Coates (national secretary), Harry Pollitt (national organiser), David Ramsay (treasurer) and Alfred Comrie were active in the campaign.

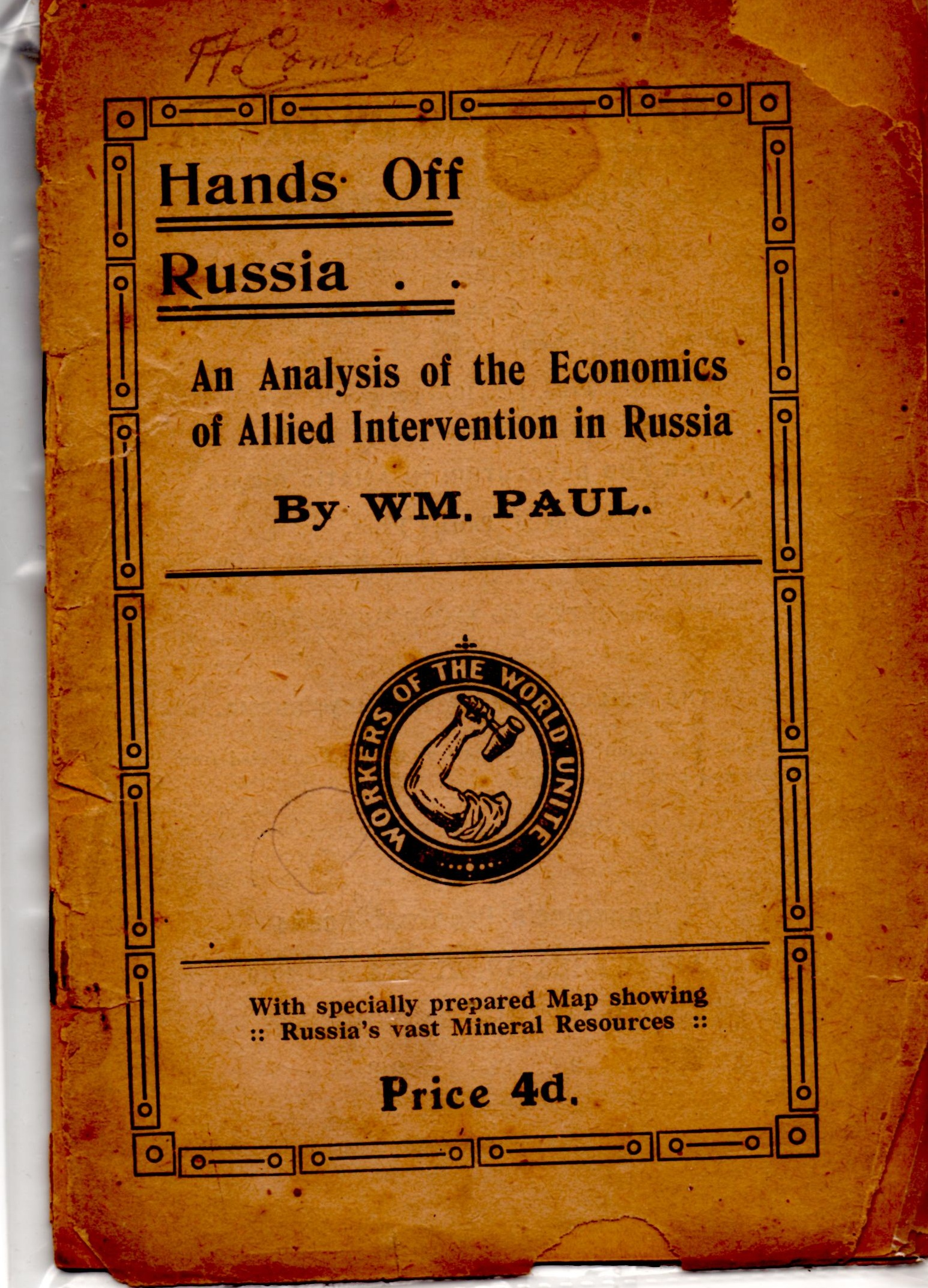
Alfred Comrie's copy of Hands Off Russia by William Paul, 1919

The initial committee members were: Mary Bamber, Isaac Brassington, John Bromley, Alexander Gordon Cameron, Rhys Davies, Robert Dunstan, William Gallacher, W. T. Goode, Alex Gossip, Harold Granville Grenfell, David Kirkwood, George Lansbury, Cecil L'Estrange Malone, Ernest Mander, Tom Mann, John Edmund Mills, Tom Myers, George Peet, Fred Shaw, Robert Smillie, Ben Spoor, and James Winstone. Many of those who were active in the Hands off Russia Campaign would go on to found the Communist Party of Great Britain the following year.

=== SS Jolly George ===
In May 1920 East London dockers refused to load the freighter SS Jolly George with arms headed for Poland, which was then at war with Soviet Russia in the Polish-Soviet War over their disputed border. Partly due to the agitation of Harry Pollitt, future leader of the Communist Party of Great Britain, who had at this point quit his job as national organiser of the movement and returned to working in the dock yards, a deputation of dockers was sent to speak with Ernest Bevin, who was then a senior official of the docker's union. Bevin pledged the full support of the union in their actions, and the owners of the ship, the Walford Line, were made to acquiesce in the unloading of the arms from the ship. The Jolly George sailed on 15 May 1920 without the offending cargo.

The movement failed to prevent the sailing of a number of other ships laden with arms for Poland, including the Danish steamer Neptune on 1 May 1920, and two Belgian barges. The shipment aboard the Jolly George was amongst the last of a consignment of weaponry promised to the Poles during the previous October.

On 5 August 1920, as the Bolshevik armies approached Warsaw, the British Labour Party and Trades Union Congress responded to a proposed Anglo-French intervention in the war by announcing that they would mobilise their movements to oppose any intervention in the war. The subsequent Polish victory in the battle of Warsaw on 16 August rendered the issue moot by making an intervention to save Poland unnecessary.

=== Aftermath ===
In 1924, Ramsay MacDonald's Labour government established diplomatic relations with the Soviet Union, and in light of this the committee was renamed as the Anglo-Russian Parliamentary Committee.

== See also ==
- Hands Off China

== Publications ==
- L. J. Macfarlane (December 1967). "Hands off Russia: Labour and the Russo–Polish War, 1920". Past and Present (38): 126–152. doi:10.1093/past/38.1.126.
- William Paul, Hands Off Russia: An Analysis of the Economics of Allied intervention in Russia. Glasgow: Socialist Labour Press, n.d. [c. 1919].
- n.a. [A. Raphailoff], Hands Off Soviet Russia! New York: Communist Labor Party of America, 1919.
- Israel Zangwill, Hands Off Russia: Speech at the Albert Hall, February 8th, 1919. London: Workers' Socialist Federation, n.d. [1919].

== Ephemera ==
- Circular Letter of Canadian "Hands Off Russia Committee," Toronto, ON, n.d. [September 1920].
