= J. T. Murphy =

British trade union organiser and Communist functionary (1888–1965)

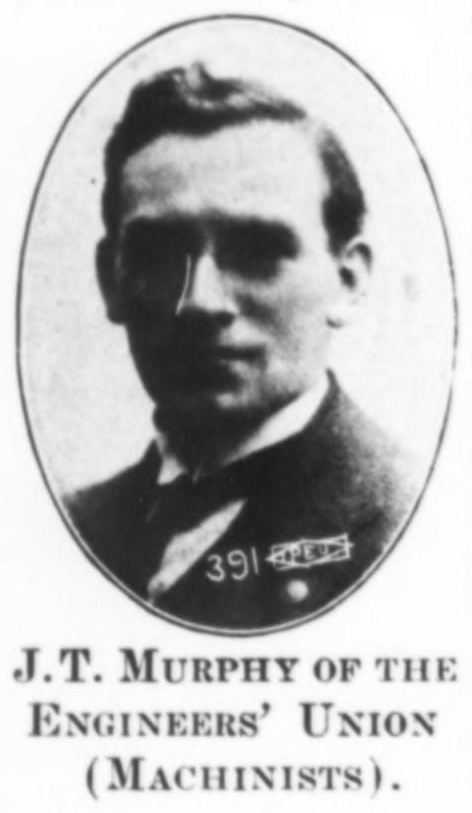
Murphy c. 1925

John Thomas Murphy (9 December 1888 – 13 May 1965) was a British trade union organiser and Communist functionary. Murphy is best remembered as a leader of the communist labour movement in the United Kingdom from the middle 1920s until his resignation from the Communist Party of Great Britain in 1932.

== Biography ==
=== Early years ===
J. T. Murphy, known to his peers as "Jack," was born on 9 December 1888 in Gorton, Manchester. His father, a Roman Catholic, worked as a blacksmith, while his Protestant mother worked as a baker. Murphy helped with the family finances from the age of 7, initially selling his mother's baked goods before taking a job working as an assistant on a milk round.

Murphy began working at an engineering works in an entry-level capacity in 1901, soon moving into a formal engineering apprenticeship, in which he remained until 1908. Thereafter Murphy worked as an engineer in his own right, remaining as a worker at the bench until 1918.

He became active in the Amalgamated Society of Engineers and was active in the Sheffield wing of the Shop Stewards Movement, which emerged in engineering factories during the First World War.

=== Communist functionary ===
Murphy joined the Socialist Labour Party (SLP) in 1916 and stood as a candidate in the 1918 General Election for the Gorton constituency in Manchester. He was elected to the governing Executive Committee of the SLP, in which capacity he participated in unity discussions between the various revolutionary socialist groups which had emerged in the country.

The SLP split at this juncture, with Murphy and others first establishing the Communist Unity Group in January 1919. He joined the Communist Party of Great Britain at its formation in 1920.

In January 1920 Murphy travelled illegally to Soviet Russia, where he attended with John S. Clarke, Helen Crawfurd, Williie Gallacher, William McLaine, Sylvia Pankhurst, Marjory Newbold, Tom Quelch, Dave Ramsay and Jack Tanner at the 2nd World Congress of the Comintern as delegate for the Shop Stewards Movement. Murphy also was a delegate to the First World Congress of the Red International of Labor Unions (RILU) in July 1921, which elected him a member of the organisation's executive committee.

Murphy was also elected as a delegate of the CPGB to the Third and Fourth World Congresses of the Communist International, held in Moscow in 1921 and 1922, respectively.

In 1925 Murphy was one of twelve CPGB officials imprisoned for seditious libel and incitement to mutiny under the Incitement to Mutiny Act 1797. Murphy was sentenced to six months in prison, and released in 1926.

Murphy was active in the National Minority Movement, the British section of RILU, from the time of its formation in 1924. He was also a member of the executive committee of CPGB from its formation in 1920 until his resignation from the party in 1932.

=== Post-communist years ===
Murphy resigned from the CPGB in 1932.

After leaving the communist movement, Murphy joined the Labour Party and was elected to the executive of their branch in Islington. Then in April 1933 he joined the Socialist League, becoming general secretary of that organisation later in the year. He would retain that position until his resignation from the Socialist League in 1936, opposing its call for the CPGB to be permitted to affiliate to the Labour Party.

He became a founder of and full-time organiser for the People's Front Propaganda Committee, which aimed to unite members of all parties against fascism and the British government's indifference to or appeasement of it. He spoke in favour of this policy at Labour's 1939 conference, but was heavily defeated, and the committee soon dissolved. The Second World War broke out shortly afterwards, and Murphy returned to work as a turner, also becoming a shop steward again for the AEU. He argued in favour of the Hitler–Stalin pact on the grounds that, he believed, Stalin had no choice in order to buy time.

Later in the war, he lectured to troops on political matters, and wrote three books supporting Stalin and the Soviet Union.

After the war, Murphy stopped all formal political activity, spending much of his time writing company histories, including one of Marks and Spencer and one of Sainsbury's. Following Stalin's death, he renounced Marxism and, later, wrote an article detailing his thoughts on the subject for the New Reasoner.

=== Death and legacy ===
J. T. Murphy died on 13 May 1965 aged 76. His son, Edward, was a first-class cricketer and doctor.

== Works ==
- The Workers' Committee: An Outline of Its Principles and Structure. (1917)
- First Year of the Lenin School (1927)
- The Labour Government: An Examination of Its Record. (1930)
- Preparing for Power: A Critical Study of the History of the British Working Class Movement. (1934)
- New Horizons. (1941) —Memoir
- Stalin, 1879–1944. (1945)
- Labour's Big Three: A Biographical Study of Clement Attlee, Herbert Morrison and Ernest Bevin. (1948)

Party political offices
| Preceded by F. C. Henry | General Secretary of the Socialist League; 1934–1936 | Succeeded by Margaret McCarthy |
