= Mary Jeff =

Scottish politician (1873–1941)

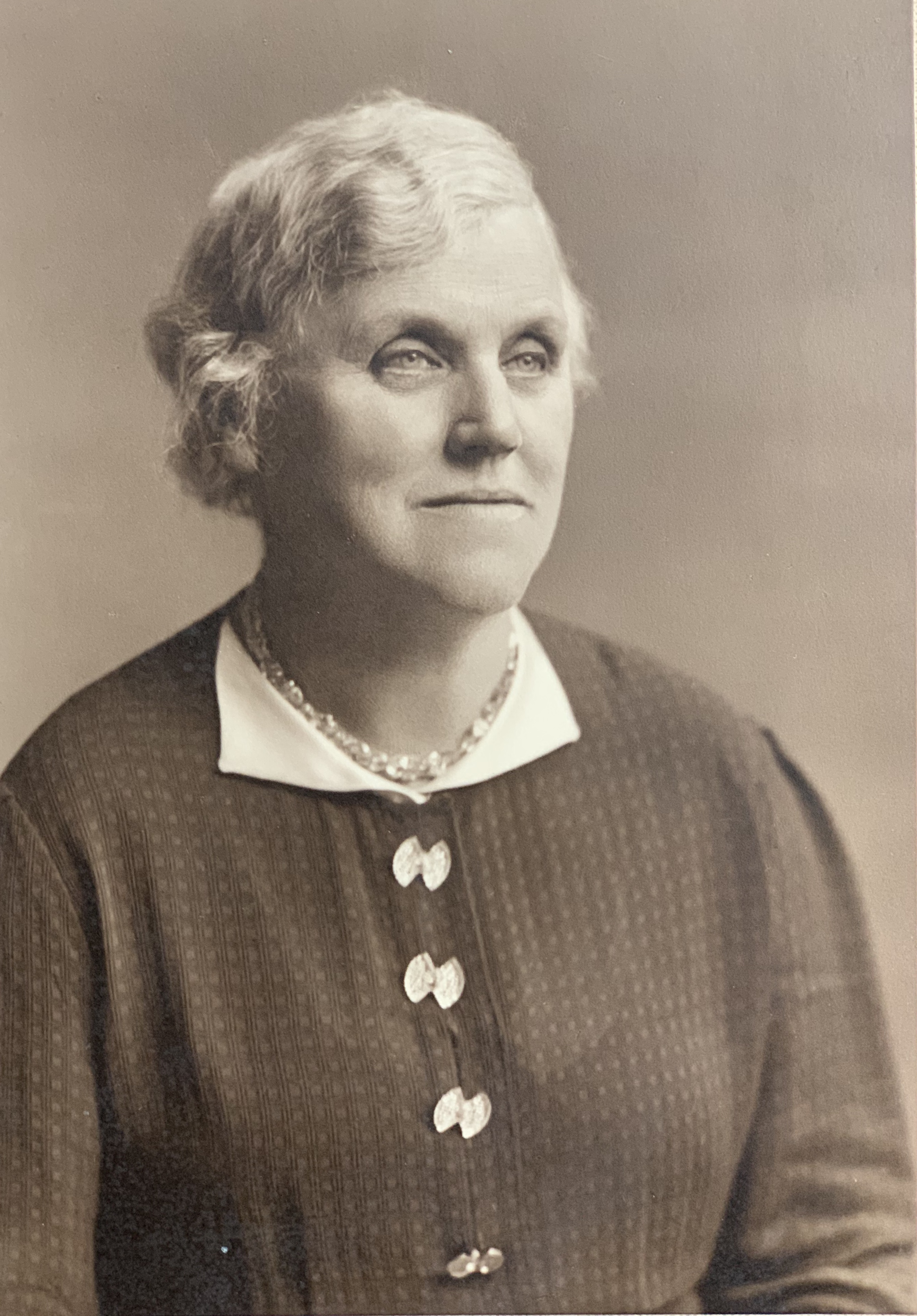
- Born: 1873; Glasgow, Scotland
- Died: 1941 (aged 67–68); Milngavie, Scotland
- Occupation: Politician
- Known for: Local politics

Mary Jeff (1873–1941) was a Scottish activist and politician who was involved in the Glasgow rent strike.

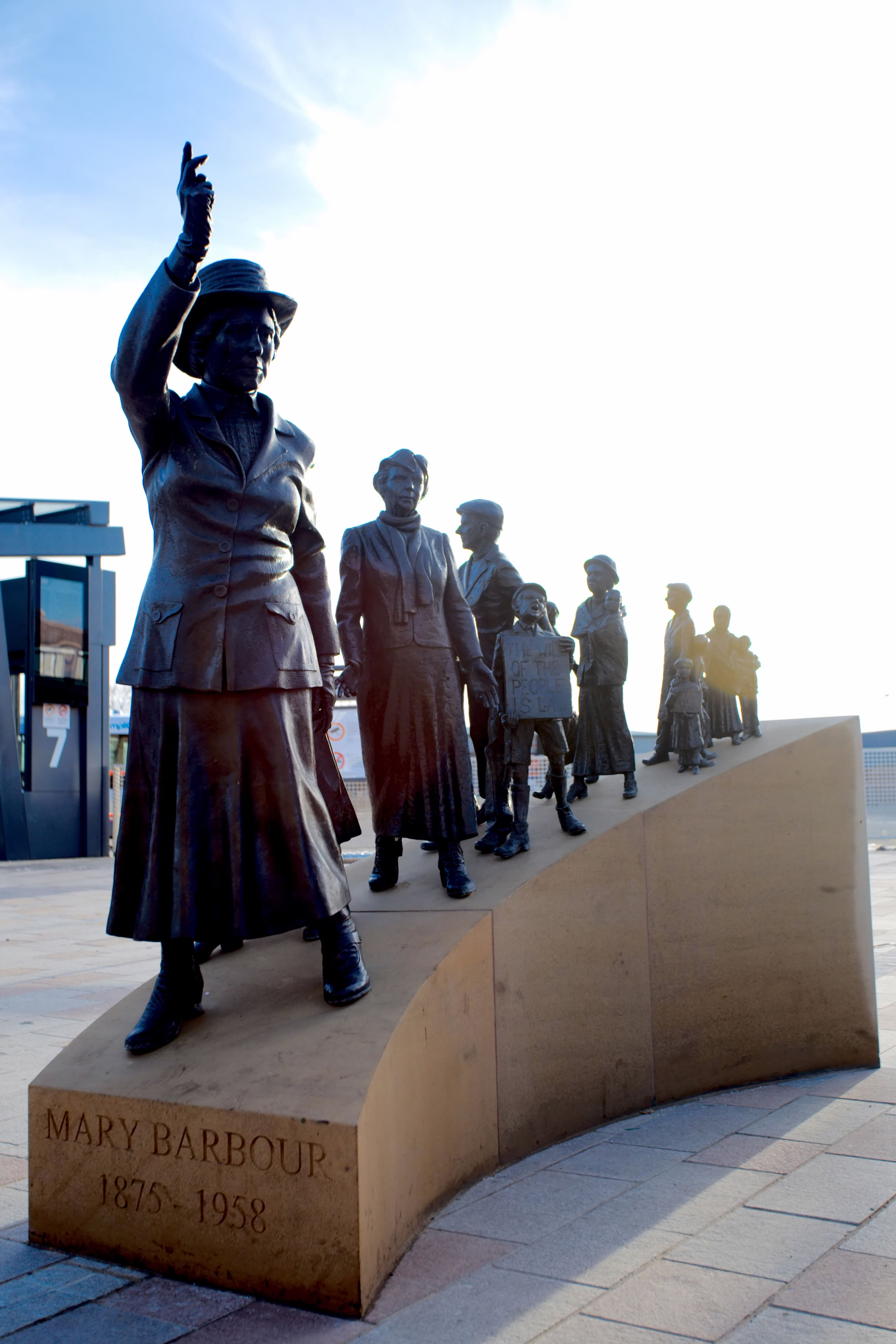
Mary Barbour Statue - Front view

== Early life and education ==
Mary Jeff was born Mary Russell Watson in Coatbridge, Lanarkshire in 1873. She moved to Govan in 1896, and lived there with her husband, printer Andrew Jeff, and their three sons.

== Community Activism and Political career ==
Mary and her husband were active in their community. They both had a key role in the Govan rent strike, Andrew as chair of the South Govan Tenants Committee, and Mary as part of the group of women who campaigned against eviction, and orchestrated the defence against bailiffs. Other women involved in this activity were Mary Barbour, Agnes Dollan, Mary Laird and Helen Crawfurd. She was a member of the Kinning Park Co-operative Women's Guild and the chairwoman of the Ladies section of the Govan War Memorial Committee. Two of her three sons had served in World War I, one of whom died. He was Andrew Russell Jeff, who was only eighteen when he was killed in action. His photograph is on the Govan Reminiscence Group's website, and he is commemorated on the Govan War Memorial. His remains are interred in the Villers-Brettonneux Cemetery on the Somme.

She was elected to Govan Parish Council in 1919, and served until at least 1926, on both the Children's Committee and the Relief Committee.

In later years, she moved to Milngavie, where she was a member of Milngavie Bowling Club and an active member of the Deacon's court of St Luke's Church of Scotland.

She died in 1941 in Milngavie, and was buried in Old Monkland Cemetery.
