= William McLaine =

British trade unionist (1891–1960)

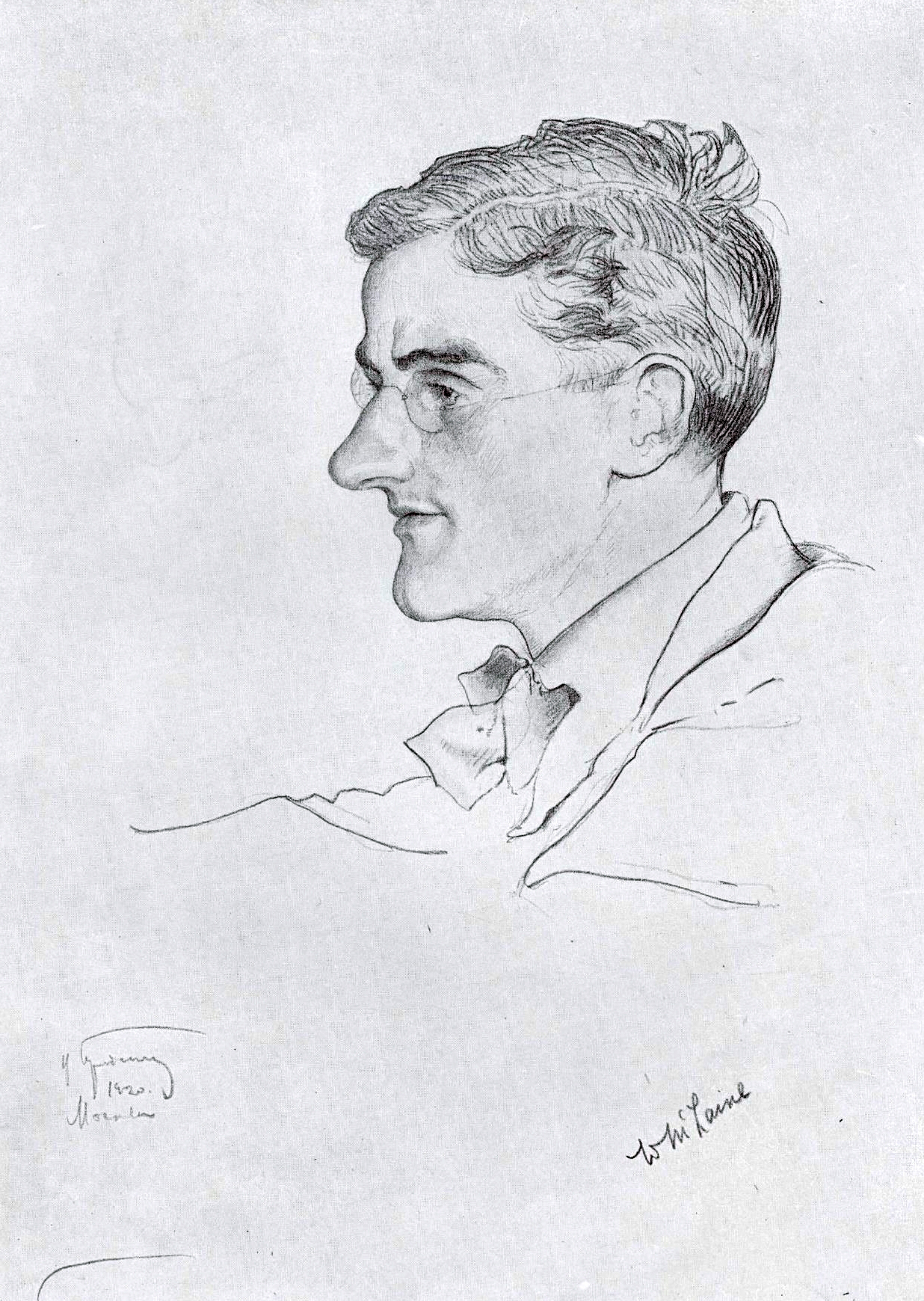
William McLaine (1920) portrait by Isaak Brodsky

William McLaine (1891–1960) was an engineer, Marxist and trade union activist.

McLaine worked as a mechanic and joined the Amalgamated Engineering Union (AEU) in 1912. He became secretary of the Manchester No.2 branch in 1916. Opposed to World War I, he joined the British Socialist Party (BSP) and was elected to its central committee in 1918. During this period, McLaine worked with William Leonard and John Maclean in running classes for the Scottish Labour College.

At the Easter conference of the (BSP), which was held at Bethnal Green Town Hall between 4 April 1920 and 5 April 1920, John MacLean used the occasion to denounce the BSP party leaders as being police spies, an accusation for which there was no evidence. According to MacLean, a private meeting was held at which McLaine was instructed, alongside Willie Gallacher to report to Lenin himself that MacLean was no longer reliable as he was suffering from "hallucinations". McLaine then attended the 2nd World Congress of the Comintern, along with Sylvia Pankhurst, Marjory Newbold, Willie Gallacher and others, McLaine and Tom Quelch representing the BSP which shortly afterwards became part of the Communist Party of Great Britain (CPGB). Whilst in Moscow McLaine was appointed to the Provisional International Bureau and the Executive Committee of Kultintern.

Although McLaine did not return to the Scottish Labour College, he remained active as an educationalist with the Plebs League and later the National Council of Labour Colleges (NCLC) publishing a series of articles called "Economics without Headaches". These articles were subsequently published as a book, An Outline of Economics. However, in time McLaine became unhappy with the new party, and resigned from it in 1929, later becoming actively anti-communist.

McLaine was a Municipal Borough of Acton Councillor from 1926 to 1932, a lecturer in industrial administration at Acton Technical College for about eight years, and Parliamentary Labour Candidate for Acton in 1935.

In 1939 McLaine gained a PhD from the University of London. His thesis was entitled The Early Trade Union Organisation among Engineering Workers.

McLaine was elected an assistant general secretary of the AEU in 1938, responsible for the national health insurance side of the union, and in 1946 he became an assistant secretary at the Ministry of Pensions, retiring in 1956.

During the Second World War the NCLC decided they wanted a postal course to train shop stewards. McLaine drafted the course for them.

In 1950 the AEU approached the NCLC as regards running a course on Industrial Management. James Millar, General Secretary of the NCLC immediately agreed, even though he wasn't sure how the course would be delivered. He contacted Frank Chapple, Nancy Hewitt and Billy Hughes who worked together as a team to deliver the course.

He continued to be active in retirement, as a general trustee of the AEU, a governor of a new girls' secondary school at Peckham, one of the managers of a group of primary schools in Lambeth, and a member of the Central London Valuation Panel, covering Westminster and the City.

== Works ==
- (1917) Trade Unionism at the Cross Roads London: British Socialist Party
- (1920, with Tom Quelch) Report as to the Communist Movement in Britain, The Communist International, June–July 1920, no.11-12, pp. 2241–46
- (1920) "An engineer in Soviet Russia" in A.E.U. Monthly Report and Journal, October 1920.
- (1921) An Outline of Economics London: Plebs League, subsequently revised by Tom Colyer in 1932
- (1939) The Engineers' Union: Book 1 Millwrights and 'Old Mechanics' (PhD Thesis, University of London)
- (1948) New Views on Apprenticeship, London: Staples Press
