= Morris Blythman =

Scottish folk revivalist (1919–1981)

- Born: Robert Morris Blythman; 1919; Inverkeithing, Fife, Scotland
- Died: 6 January 1981 (aged 62); Edinburgh, Scotland
- Occupations: Poet; Schoolteacher
- Spouse: Marion Paterson (m. 1946)
- Children: Joanna Blythman
- Writing career
- Pen name: Thurso Berwick
- Language: Scots; English
- Literary movement: Scottish Renaissance

Morris Blythman (1919–1981), also known by his pen name Thurso Berwick, was a poet, song maker, schoolteacher, folk revivalist, publisher and political activist. He is considered one of the architects of the Scottish Folk Revival alongside his wife Marion Blythman, Hamish Henderson and Norman and Janey Buchan. As an activist he was primarily concerned with Scottish nationalism, republicanism and the broad, unaligned, popular protest to the siting of the Polaris nuclear weapons system in the Holy Loch.

As a poet he published exclusively under his pen name, Thurso Berwick – conceived to represent his ambition for a political solidarity that would span Scotland from Thurso in the north to Berwick in the south. His published poetic output, somewhat in the "Synthetic Scots" style of Hugh MacDiarmid, was initially regarded in the mainstream of Scottish modernism alongside luminaries such as Edwin Morgan. Hamish Henderson considered Blythman a member of 'The Clyde Group' which included MacDiarmid, John Kincaid, George Todd, T. S. Law and Alexander Scott. However, like Henderson, Blythman would latterly be drawn primarily into political song-making seeing himself as participating in a "'sub-literary' tradition of partisan and often scurrilous satirical verse and song, which has enlivened every conflict and controversy in Scottish history".

Morris is the father of journalist and writer Joanna Blythman.

== Early life and work ==
Blythman was born in Inverkeithing. He married his wife Marion in Glasgow in 1946 and soon after while both were working in Aberdeenshire they met Arthur Argo.

Blythman played a role in organising the meeting in Glasgow that commemorated the 25th anniversary of the death of the Scottish Republican leader John Maclean held on Saint Andrew's Day 1948. 'The Clyde Group', Sydney Goodsir Smith, Young Communist League Choir and Glasgow Unity Theatre were all in attendance or performed at the meeting. Blythman described Henderson's John Maclean March performed at the Glasgow meeting as "the first swallow of the [folk] Revival". Henderson would later repay the compliment "".

His involvement in the 1951 Edinburgh People's Festival Ceilidh was seminal in forming the Edinburgh People's Festival.

Blythman was a member of the Bo'ness Rebels Literary Society which operated between 1948 and 1976. It's likely that Blythman, along with Hugh MacDonald was instrumental in the publishing of the Society's Rebels Ceilidh Song Book series (1951–1966) which showcased material sung at the group's renowned Rebel Ceilidhs organised by chairman Willie Kellock.

Blythman's Ballad and Blues folk club begun in 1952 or 53 and held at Allan Glen's School in Glasgow was an early example of the folk club format in Scotland. Around this time, Blythman and his wife Marion – just as Norman and Janey Buchan were doing elsewhere in the city – began hosting influential house ceilidhs.

Blythman provided the seminal setting of the Scots ballad The Twa Corbies by marrying the traditional words to the tune of the Breton song "An Alarc'h". It was Blythman's setting that was recorded by Ray and Archie Fisher, Jean Redpath, Ian Campbell, Nigel Denver, Jack Beck and others.

== Republican activism ==
=== Sangs o’ the Stane ===
In the early 1950s, Blythman created a series of richly sardonic, comic songs to celebrate the 1950 removal of the Stone of Scone. His song-making process involved marrying a newly penned song text to an existing – traditional or popular – tune. In this way he was following in an orthodox, traditional song-making praxis that had defined oral balladry for centuries. This song making method connected his and his friend Hamish Henderson's contemporary songs with those of Robert Burns, Robert Fergusson, Allan Ramsay and the work of the bards and makars that preceded them. Blythman's new sardonic song texts were biting satires, designed to ridicule his political opponents. The songs were well suited to communal protest and Blythman delighted in the "demonstration singing" that the songs enabled. Blythman was to return repeatedly to this creative approach in future. Author Ailie Munro would later categorise the demonstration songs cast in this mould as the "rebel-burlesque genre".

American folklorist Alan Lomax visited Glasgow in June 1951 to record Blythman singing many of these new songs. This visit was one leg of a much wider itinerary co-ordinated by Hamish Henderson that included visits to Sorley MacLean, John D. Burgess and Flora MacNeil.

In 1952, Blythman published his new songs in a collection Sangs o’ the Stane. While the majority of the songs were Blythman's the collections also included contributions by Goodsir Smith, Henderson, MacDiarmid, Norman MacCaig, John McEvoy and T. S. Law.

=== EIIR Songs ===
The coronation of Elizabeth II provided Blythman with his next opportunity for satirical song making. His Coronation Coronach (originally titled Limey Lizzie) took issue with Queen Elizabeth adopting the royal style of Elizabeth the Second – Scotland had not previously had a monarch of that name as Elizabeth I had been Queen of England and Ireland only. The song would later become widely popular as The Scottish Breakaway and be recorded by The Dubliners, Hamish Imlach and Ray Fisher.

Blythman's Sky-High Joe and Sky High Pantomime similarly celebrated the Pillar Box War that occurred when Elizabeth's royal cypher, 'EIIR', appeared on Scottish post boxes.

== Anti-polaris activism ==
Blythman conceived the strongly satirical folk protest against the siting of the Polaris nuclear weapon programme in the Holy Loch. Henderson described him as ‘the unrivalled chief and brigade-major of the anti-Polaris balladeers’. The different aspects of this protest were carried out with a number of coadjutants under a range of campaigning aliases. The Glasgow Song Guild published and printed pamphlets containing the protest songs they had made, while the Anti-polaris Singers would distribute the pamphlets at the numerous protests held at Holy Loch in 1962 and lead the singing on the march. The whole, unaligned protest group would later be dubbed the Glasgow Eskimos by Blythman, reputedly referencing a quote by Captain Richard Boyer Laning (1918–2000) of the USS Proteus, “They’re just a bunch of goddam Eskimos”. However, as no primary source for this quote by Laning can be identified, it is possible that this moniker was also Blythman's invention.

The anthem of this protest was Ding Dong Dollar. Set to the tune of Ye cannae shove yer granny aff a bus with the repeated refrain "O ye canny spend a dollar when ye're deid", the song was a satire on the local community's eagerness to realise the financial benefits of having the American Navy docked nearby.

Blythman's collaborators in the songmaking and on the march included his wife Marion, singer Josh MacRae, Jim McLean, Freddie Anderson, Nigel Denver, Matt McGinn, T. S. Law, Alastair McDonald, Cilla Fisher, Hamish Henderson, Alex Comfort his friends John Mack Smith, Jackie O'Connor, Ian Wade and others.

In 1963, Folkways Records released an LP Ding Dong Dollar: Anti-Polaris and Scottish Republican Songs credited to the Glasgow Song Guild and featuring the Blythmans and many of their collaborators performing the songs. This LP contained the first commercially available recording of Hamish Henderson's seminal Freedom Come-All-Ye sung by Blythman's friend Jackie O'Connor.

== Selected outputs ==
=== Poetry and song ===
As Thurso Berwick:

- Fowrsom Reel with John Kincaid, George Todd and F. J. Anderson, (Glasgow 1949)
- Ballad of the four 'conspirators' (1950s)

As Scottish National Congress:

- Sangs o’ the Stane with Hugh MacDiarmid, Sydney Goodsir Smith and others (1952)

As Glasgow Song Guild with Marion Blythman and others:

- Ding Dong Dollar – Anti‑Polaris Songs pamphlet in 8 editions (1961–1962)
- Ding Dong Dollar: Anti-Polaris and Scottish Republican Songs – Folkways Records (1963)
- Rebel Ceilidh Song Book '67 (1966)

=== Edited books ===
- Homage to John MacLean with T. S. Law (1973), The John MacLean Society
- The Socialist Poems of Hugh MacDiarmid with T.S. Law (1978), London: Routledge & Kegan Paul
