= The John Maclean March =

The John MacLean March is a Scottish song written by Hamish Henderson in 1948. It eulogises the socialist organiser John Maclean, describing his funeral procession through Glasgow in 1923.

== Background ==
John Maclean was a prominent socialist leader in early-20th century Glasgow, a key figure in the Red Clydeside movement, and sometimes described as the "Scottish Lenin". By the time of the First World War, he had moved towards revolutionary socialism, and strongly opposed the war as imperialist. He was imprisoned in 1916, released in 1917, and named as the Scottish consul for the revolutionary Bolshevik government in early 1918. In April 1918 he was arrested for sedition, convicted and imprisoned, then released again after the Armistice following a hunger strike. After the war, he split from the Communist Party of Great Britain to found the Scottish Communist Party, then left this to form the Scottish Workers Republican Party, calling for an independent Communist Scotland.

In 1923, he died aged 44, with his health broken after the long-term effects of imprisonment. His funeral was a mass public event, perhaps the largest ever to be held in Glasgow, with possibly ten thousand people following the funeral procession.

== The song ==
The song covers four verses, with the last line of each verse repeated with emphasis in place of a chorus. Henderson's notes indicate the first verse should then be repeated, starting softly and working up to a crescendo.

The first verse calls to the listener in different areas of Scotland ("Hey, Mac, did ye see him, as ye cam' doon by Gorgie...") - before setting the action firmly in Glasgow, with men leaving their work to greet Maclean ("Turn oot, Jock and Jimmie, leave your crans and your muckle gantries"). In the second, the procession moves through Glasgow, down Argyle Street and London Road, bringing out both Highlanders and Irishmen ("the red and the green, lad, we'll wear side by side").

The third takes the procession to Glasgow Green, home of many past mass demonstrations. It sets Maclean in his position as a leader ("they'll mind what he said here / in Glasgie, oor city - and the haill warld beside") and on a level with his contemporaries overseas ("Lenin's his fiere, lad, an' Liebknecht's his mate"). The fourth moves to a more domestic setting, with the marchers returning to their homes with Maclean's memory ("at hame wi' his Glasgie freens, their fame and their pride"). It closes with a look to the future, when "the red will be worn, my lads, an' Scotland will march again / Noo great John Maclean has come hame tae the Clyde".

As with much of Henderson's writing, the song is written in a broad Scots register, with flashes of humour - the workmen must rush, because Maclean will be "ower thrang tae bide", too busy to wait for them. Timothy Neat identified the use of Scots as helping tighten the link between the singer and the audience, and described the poem as "at once traditional in form and contemporary in content".

It was written by Henderson to be performed to a traditional tune, an adaptation of "Bonny Glenshee", later adapted further as the tune for Scotland the Brave.

== Performance and recordings ==
Henderson wrote the song for a memorial meeting commemorating MacLean in November 1948, the twenty-fifth anniversary of his death. It was sung by William Noble to end the event, following poems by Hugh MacDiarmid, Sydney Goodsir Smith, and Sorley MacLean, and was warmly received, "passing in one singing into the musical consciousness of the nation. Morris Blythman, the organiser, described Noble's performance as "the first swallow of the folk revival".

Henderson later performed it as part of the Edinburgh People's Festival Ceilidh in August 1951, which was recorded by Alan Lomax. It was one of the few overtly political pieces performed at the event. A second recording of Henderson performing the song in London, March 1951, also survives in the Lomax collection.

Later recordings include those by The Clutha (1971), Dick Gaughan (1972), Tonight at Noon (1988), North Sea Gas (2000), and Danny Glover (2008).
