= Bo'ness Branch SNP =

Local political party in Falkirk, Scotland

Bo'ness Branch SNP refers to the branch of the Scottish National Party local to Bo'ness, West Lothian, Scotland. Bo'ness is a site of significance to the cause of Scottish nationalism due to a strong history of various nationalist groups like the Bo'ness Rebels Literary Society, active branches of the Young Scots National League, (a predecessor to today's Young Scots for Independence) its own local Scottish Covenant committee, as well as the foreshore in Bo'ness being the home of an independent nationalist candidates at parliamentary elections as early as the 1950 General Election, decades before the SNP itself stood candidates in every constituency in Scotland.

== Founding ==
The first mention of the Bo'ness Branch SNP can be found in the Bo'ness Journal from Friday 22 November 1946. In the correspondence columns, a letter from a Mr Chas J. Auld of Dean Road, then the Secretary of Bo’ness SNP welcomes "the winter session" on behalf of the Scottish National Party, and states that during this time, "besides the weekly committee meetings, we intend on running a new year dance and burns supper".

This would come to be the first event of the Bo'ness Rebels Literary Society, just over a year later.

The SNP won their first election in Bo'ness on May 3, 1949. William Horn, then 'Branch Chairman' of the Bo'ness Branch was elected for Bo'ness South Ward. The SNP did not stand candidates in any other wards, and Horn's election agent, Charles Auld is the same person who wrote the letter to the journal mentioned above. This suggests the 'Bo'ness Branch SNP' would have been a small organisation, which is of significance when considering the history of the 'branch founding' which follows.

This is comparatively early for electoral success in the history of Scottish Nationalism, but when considering that at this time the Bo'ness Rebels ceilidhs would have been occurring regularly, and there had been a debate on Scottish Independence in Bo'ness Town Hall on 29 March of the same year, this adds a distinctly local dimension to the general post war discontent of British government amongst some Scots reflected in various events around this time, namely the election of the first SNP MP Dr. Robert Macintyre in 1945, the home rule protests against British PM Clement Attlee during his visit to the Cowal Highland Gathering in Dunoon in 1950, and the returning of the stone of scone.

However, the Scots independent newspaper possesses a list of the dates of the founding of SNP branches based on their own archives, which states that the Bo'ness Branch was founded much later in February 1963 - which is at odds from the evidence of the Bo'ness journal from 1946.

The reason for this is not particularly clear - it is possible that the 'Bo'ness Branch SNP' of the 1940s was not formally affiliated with the SNP as a party, or perhaps became an organisation whose purpose in the 1950s became solely to field candidates at election time, while its members were more focussed on the Rebels Society or the Covenant groups etc. in Bo'ness which were focussed on 'home rule' of some kind.

In the late 1950s, however, a meeting was held at the Douglas Hotel in Bo'ness, now demolished, where the town clock is today. This was organised and attended by a few nationalists in the town and surrounding areas, including William Kellock, then secretary of the Bo'ness Rebels Literary Society, Jack Marshall who would later be Billy Wolfe's election agent in the 1962 West Lothian by-election - the constituency of which Bo'ness was then a part - and Angus McGillveray of Whitburn who would later run the SNPs publication department.

This meeting was to be the beginning of a 'West Lothian' branch of The SNP, which over time attracted so many members that they subsequently dissolved into various smaller branches for each individual town, as is the case for SNP branches today.

This fits in with the Scots independents notification that the Bo'ness Branch as it is today was founded in February 1963, so factually this is the founding date of the Bo'ness Branch.
