= James Dunlop MacDougall =

Scottish political activist (1891–1963)

James Dunlop MacDougall (15 January 1891 – 25 December 1963), also known as James McDougall, was a Scottish political activist, best known as John Maclean's leading supporter.

== Early life ==
MacDougall was born in Pollokshaws and was educated at Shawlands Academy. His father, a tailor also named James, served as the provost of Pollokshaws from 1905 until 1911, and held unionist views. However MacDougall was increasingly influenced by his two uncles who lived nearby: John and Daniel, a disabled cobbler, who were active in the Progressive Union, an anarchist group in which John Maclean was involved.

McDougall left school at an early age and found work as a clerk at the Clydesdale Bank.

== Social Democratic Federation ==
In 1906, John Maclean, already a well-known socialist, gave a series of speeches in Pollokshaws, his home town. The speeches inspired the formation of a local branch of the Social Democratic Federation (SDF), and MacDougall became its first secretary, aged only sixteen.

MacDougall soon became a leading supporter of Maclean, working with him in the co-operative movement, in particular campaigning for it to organise classes to teach Marxist economics. He personally taught well-attended classes in locations including Paisley and Lanarkshire.

MacDougall lost his job when a local landlord wrote to the Clydesdale, threatening to withdraw his money unless MacDougall was sacked. MacDougall and Maclean responded by launching a campaign for trade unions to withdraw their money from the bank. The Falkirk branch of the Associated Ironmoulders of Scotland did so, and MacDougall later repaid this by working unpaid for the ironmoulders while they were on strike in 1912.

== British Socialist Party and the Clyde Workers Committee ==
The SDF became the British Socialist Party in 1911, and MacDougall attended its first conference, the following year, at which he was appointed to a committee to investigate grievances in the Aberdeen branch. Around this time, he became interested in syndicalism, a position which Maclean did not share, but this did not produce a lasting rift, and MacDougall was soon back to acting as Maclean's chief supporter.

In 1914, MacDougall was elected to the Eastwood School Board, joining his comrade James Blair, the SDF's greatest success in the area. The following year, he worked with Maclean to relaunch The Vanguard, newspaper of the Glasgow BSP. They used this to make anti-war propaganda, a position they tried to get the Clyde Workers' Committee to adopt. The Socialist Labour Party held a majority on the committee and disagreed, at one point having MacDougall and Peter Petroff removed from a meeting for trying to debate the subject.

Opposing the war often led to trouble from the authorities and confrontations with pro-war groups. In 1916, he and Jimmy Maxton spoke at a meeting on Glasgow Green against the deportation of David Kirkwood, and the two were arrested and charged with inducing workers to obstruct the war effort. They were advised to plead guilty, and were sentenced to twelve months; around the same time, Maclean, Willie Gallacher and many other leaders of the Clyde Workers' Committee were jailed. Kept in Calton Jail in Edinburgh, MacDougall struggled mentally during his time inside.

At the 1918 general election, MacDougall stood for the BSP in Glasgow Tradeston. Unlike some BSP candidates, he did not receive the support of the Labour Party, although its local Glasgow committee gave him its support, so he did not face any Labour opposition. He took 19.4% of the votes cast, the best performance of any BSP candidate who did not have official Labour Party backing.

== Activities in the 1920s ==
Unconvinced about the merits of the new Communist Party of Great Britain (CPGB), Maclean established the Communist Labour Party in 1920, but was not able to attend the founding conference, so MacDougall led support for Maclean's positions at its founding conference. However, Gallacher convinced a majority of delegates that it should instead seek to join the CPGB, barracking the official speakers and nearly starting fights, and he succeeded in defeating MacDougall in the votes. Maclean left the group, joining the Socialist Labour Party, and MacDougall may have followed him.

In 1919, a Scottish Labour College was opened, largely on the initiative of Maclean, MacDougall, Maxton, Gallacher and Helen Crawfurd. Two years later, the offices of the Scottish Labour College were raided by the police, and MacDougall was sentenced to sixty days in prison for incitement and sedition. This second imprisonment led MacDougall to suffer what was described as a "nervous collapse", and kept him out of political activity for some time. As he recovered, he spent time trying to organise unemployed workers as part of Maclean's Tramp Trust Unlimited and did some work at the Scottish Labour College, but became increasingly disillusioned and gave few speeches. The CPGB unsuccessfully attempted to persuade him to resume political activity for them; however, he wrote a number of articles for Communist Review in 1925 and 1926 and appears to have briefly held membership of the party.

MacDougall visited the Soviet Union in 1926, on the invitation of the CPGB. However, he was unhappy with his treatment there, as a privileged guest, while conditions for workers and peasants were poor. On his return to Britain, he disassociated himself from the communist movement and began writing for Nineteenth Century and the New Statesman, and joined the Liberal Party. He stood for the Liberals in Rutherglen at the 1929 general election, but took only 8.8% of the vote and was not elected.

== Later life ==
MacDougall next joined Oswald Mosley's New Party, becoming one of the party's southern organisers, and wrote a pamphlet entitled "Disillusionment" for the group in 1931. He resigned from the group when it adopted fascism, and instead joined the Scottish Socialist Party, an Independent Labour Party split which was close to the Labour Party.

During World War II, MacDougall was isolated from his former comrades and without work, ultimately finding a job as a clerk at a jam factory. In the 1950s, he became known for anti-Catholicism, and supported the Conservative Party.
