= Jack Leckie =

Scottish communist activist

- Born: Jack Villiers Leckie; May 3, 1887; Maybole, Ayrshire, Scotland
- Occupation: Communist activist
- Known for: Founding chairman, Communist Labour Party (1920); Communist Party of Great Britain Comintern representative in Berlin; British secretary, Workers' International Relief (1925–1929)

Jack Villiers Leckie (born 3 May 1887) was a Scottish communist activist.

== Early life ==
Leckie was born in Maybole, Ayrshire, Scotland, into an Irish family. He became interested in anarchism and industrial unionism, and travelled to the United States. He arrived in New York City on 14 October 1914, and proceeded to join the Industrial Workers of the World. He apparently acquired U.S. citizen in Connecticut in 1916, listing himself as a machinist. He then lived for a while in Chicago, before returning to the UK in 1918.

== Political activism ==
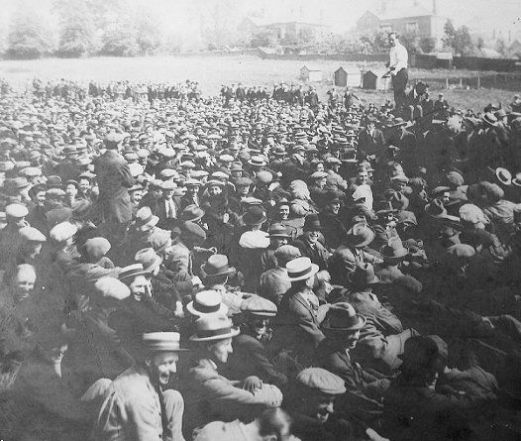
Jack Leckie addressing a rally of engineers at Radford Road, Coventry, during the 1922 Engineers' Lockout.

Leckie returned to Scotland and joined the Socialist Labour Party (SLP), which was central to the Clyde Defence Committee. Leckie was elected the committee's secretary. The Socialist described him at the time as "an ardent antiparliamentarian, who breathes dynamite, and talks red armies". In 1920, Leckie co-founded with other committee leaders, such as John Maclean, the Communist Labour Party (CLP), and was elected party chairman. It was intended to be a Scottish communist party that opposed participation in Parliament or joint work with the Labour Party.

According to Graham Stevenson, Leckie attended the 2nd World Congress of the Comintern, although he does not appear in the official list of delegates. Either way, he became convinced of the need for British communists to unite in a single communist party, to participate in elections, and to seek affiliation to the Labour Party. As a result, he championed the merger of the CLP into the new Communist Party of Great Britain (CPGB), which was completed at a unity conference early in 1921.

Leckie grew interested in the Irish Republican Army (IRA) and the potential of creating a workers' army in Scotland. He brought over a captain from the IRA and began drilling volunteers in eastern Fife, although this project was abandoned when he was called away by the CPGB to organise workers in Coventry. There, he supported engineers during the lock-out, and became the leading figure in the Coventry Unemployed Workers' Movement, which planned to stand him in the 1922 general election. The CPGB initially backed Leckie's candidacy, and he campaigned in the city. In August, however, the CPGB withdrew its support in the interests of unity with the Labour Party, and Leckie stood down.

Leckie attended the 4th World Congress of the Comintern as a member of the Presidium. The Congress deputised him to investigate conditions in the Ruhr under the Franco-Belgian occupation. He served as the CPGB's representative to the Comintern at its headquarters in Berlin. During his time there, he was given permission to attend the Central Committee meetings of the Communist Party of Germany.

In 1925, Leckie was sent back to the UK to become the British secretary of Workers International Relief, a CPGB-led organisation, with a brief to move it from a focus on funding welfare to a more combative role. Leckie hoped to return to Germany, but the run-up to the UK general strike and the imprisonment of much of the party's leadership meant that he could not be spared.

The CPGB considered running Leckie as a candidate in the 1928 Linlithgowshire by-election, but eventually decided against it, due to a lack of funds. However, he did contest Dunfermline Burghs at the 1929 general election, where he took 6.5% of the vote.

He remained active in the CPGB for a few more years, making the news when he was arrested during a textile workers' dispute in West Yorkshire in 1930.

Political offices
Preceded by Helen Crawfurd	British Secretary of Workers International Relief; 1925 – 1929	Succeeded by Isabel Brown
