= Joanna Blythman =

British journalist (born 1956)

- Writing career
- Notable work: Shopped: The Shocking Power Of British Supermarkets
- Notable awards: Glenfiddich Food & Drink Awards; 2005 Best Food Book – Shopped: The Shocking Power of British Supermarkets

Joanna Blythman (born 1956) is a British investigative food journalist and writer and a commentator on the British food chain who has covered subjects including salmon farming, supermarkets, intensive pineapple production, bird flu and the causes of obesity.

Blythman was born in Springburn in Glasgow, the daughter of lecturer in Education, Marion Blythman and socialist campaigner and Scottish republican songwriter Morris Blythman.

As of 2006, Blythman has won five Glenfiddich Awards for her writing, including a Glenfiddich Special Award for her first book, The Food We Eat, and the Glenfiddich Food Book of the Year Award in 2005 for Shopped, as well as a Caroline Walker Media Award for Improving the Nation's Health by Means of Good Food, and a Guild of Food Writers Award for The Food We Eat. In 2004, she won one of BBC Radio 4's Food and Farming Awards, the Derek Cooper Award. In 2007 she was awarded the Good Housekeeping award for Outstanding Contribution to Food. She has also written two other books, How to Avoid GM Food and The Food Our Children Eat. Her other books are What To Eat (2012) and Swallow This (2015).

Blythman broadcasts regularly on issues relating to food (Tonight, BBC Breakfast, GMTV, The Money Programme, Dispatches, Time Shift and on Radio 4 The Food Programme and Woman's Hour). She writes a weekly restaurant review and an opinion column for the Sunday Herald, and has contributed to newspapers and magazines including The Observer Food Monthly, Daily Mail, Guardian, BBC Countryfile magazine, Olive magazine, The Oldie and The Grocer.

== Bibliography ==
- The Food We Eat: The Book You Cannot Afford to Ignore (2nd ed.). London: Penguin Books. 1998. ISBN 978-0-718-13912-4.
- The Food Our Children Eat: How to Get Children to Like Good Food. London: Fourth Estate. 1999. ISBN 978-1-857-02936-9.
- How to Avoid GM Food: Hundreds of Brands, Products and Ingredients to Avoid. London: Fourth Estate. 1999. ISBN 978-1-841-15187-8.
- Shopped: The Shocking Power of British Supermarkets. London: Fourth Estate. 2004. ISBN 978-0-007-15803-4.
- Bad Food Britain: How a Nation Ruined Its Appetite. London: Fourth Estate. 2006. ISBN 978-0-007-21994-0.
- What to Eat: Food That's Good for Your Health, Pocket and Plate. London: Fourth Estate. 2012. ISBN 978-0-007-47646-6.
- Swallow This: Serving Up the Food Industry's Darkest Secrets. London: Fourth Estate. 2015. ISBN 978-0-007-54833-0.
