= Lorne Street Primary School =

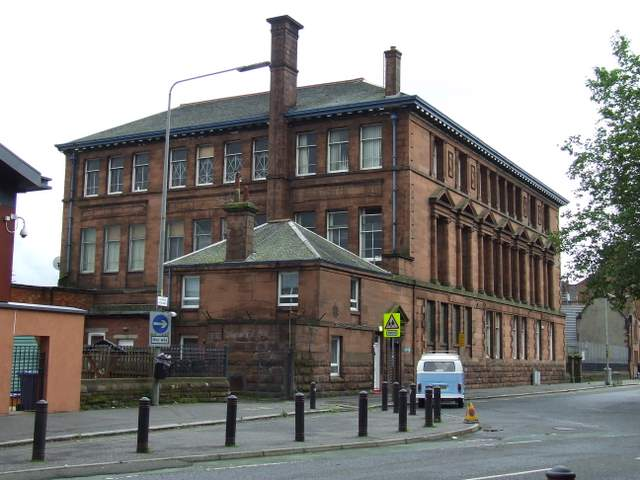

Location
- 28 Lorne Street; Glasgow, G51 1DP; Scotland; 55.854°N 4.287°W

Information
- Type: Primary school
- Established: 1892; 134 years ago
- Local authority: Glasgow City Council
- Head teacher: A. Nicolson
- Gender: Mixed
- Capacity: 328
- Website: www.lornestreet-pri.glasgow.sch.uk

Lorne Street Primary School is a primary school in Glasgow, Scotland. The building was designed by H&D Barclay and opened in 1892. It is now protected as a category B listed building.

== Notable staff ==
- John Maclean, socialist politician and former teacher at the school until his dismissal in 1915 for his political activism
