= An Alarc'h =

Traditional Breton song

"An Alarc'h" ("The Swan") is a Breton traditional song. It is found in the 1839 collection Barzaz Breiz. It tells of the return from exile in England of the Breton prince Jean de Montfort (known as "The Swan of Montfort") and his defeat of the French army under Bertrand du Guesclin in 1379. It has been recorded by, amongst others, Alan Stivell and Gilles Servat.

The Scottish folk song "The Twa Corbies", a variation of the English song "The Three Ravens", was set to the tune of "An Alarc'h" by R. M. Blythman.

== Lyrics ==
(From the Barzaz Breiz of 1839)

Breton original	English translation
Eunn alarc'h, eunn alarc'h tre-mor (×2) War lein tour moal kastell Armor! Dinn, dinn, daon! dann emgann! dann emgann! Oh! Dinn, dinn, daon! d'ann emgann a eann! Neventi vad d'ar Vretoned! Ha malloz-ru d'ar C'hallaoued! Dinn, dinn, daon! d'ann emgann! d'ann emgann! etc. Erru eul lestr, e pleg ar mor, He weliou gwenn gant han digor; Digouet ann otrou Iann endro, Digouet eo da ziwall he vro; D'hon diwall doc'h ar C'hallaoued, A vac'hom war ar Vretoned. Ken e losker eur iouaden, A ra d'an od eur grenaden; Ken a zon ar meneiou Laz; Ha froen, ha drid ar gazek c'hlas; Ken a gan laouen ar c'hleier, Kant leo tro-war-dro, e peb ker. Deut e ann heol, deut e ann han; Deut e endro ann otrou Iann!	A swan, a swan, across the sea (×2) On the height of the bare tower of Castle Armor! Dinn, dinn, daon! to battle! to battle! Oh! Dinn, dinn, daon! I'm on my way to battle! Good tidings to the Bretons! A red curse on the French! Dinn, dinn, daon! to battle! to battle! etc. A ship has come into the gulf, Its white sails are open; The Lord John's come back, Come back to protect his country; To defend us against the French Encroaching on the Bretons. A cry of joy is let out, Making the coast shake; The Laz mountains resound; And the white mare [i.e. the sea] neighs and jumps; The bells sing with joy, A hundred places all around, and every house.. The sun has come, summer has come; Sir John is on his way back!

A less frequently performed (or recorded) version of the song exists, containing a further 23 verses (for a total of 32) which is yet to be translated to English.

== Recordings ==
- À l'Olympia, Alan Stivell (1972, Fontana, 6399 005)
- Musiques Celtiques, An Triskell (1973, Philips, 632145)
- Je Ne Hurlerai Pas Avec Les Loups, Gilles Servat (1983, Kalondour, 814 362-1)
- Tri Yann an Naoned, Tri Yann (1972, Kelenn, 6332 626)
- Hanternoz, (August 2013)
- Molène, Didier Squiban (1997, L'Oz Production – L'OZ 17)
