= T. S. Law =

Scottish poet (1916–1997)

Thomas Sturdy Law (31 October 1916 – 12 May 1997) was a Scottish poet whose work was published throughout the latter half of the 20th century. His poetry is mainly in the Scots language, although he also wrote some poetry and prose in English.

== Biography ==
Law was born into a Lanarkshire mining family. His earliest surviving writings date from World War II, (e.g., Silversmiths in the Gambia, Mocking Birds in Berlin, Good Angel), during which time he was an airframe fitter in the Royal Air Force. While posted to South Africa in 1942, he met Margaret Rose MacPhail (Peggy), who would, six years later, make the trip to Scotland to become his wife. Also in 1948, Law published his first collection of poems, Whit Tyme in the Day, with a foreword written by Hugh MacDiarmid. After the war, Law worked as a miner for a number of years, and later became a technical writer for Rolls-Royce plc at their East Kilbride site. He and Peggy had two sons, John and Andrew.

In the 1960s, Law became politically active in the anti-nuclear movement, co-writing protest songs with Thurso Berwick (Morris Blythman) and other members of the ‘Glasgow Song Guild’ for the Second Rebel Ceilidh Song Book (1965). Also with Berwick, he co-edited the books Homage to John MacLean (1973) and The Socialist Poems of Hugh MacDiarmid (1978). Throughout the 1960s and 1970s Law published over a hundred poems in magazines and journals, and self-published his poetry in a series of pamphlets: Abbey Craig tae Stirling Castle (1974), Aftentymes a Tinkler (1975), Whyles a Targe (1975), A Pryle o Aces (1977), and The N.C.O.’s (1980).

After his retirement in the early 1980s, Law devoted himself full-time to poetry, tackling longer poetical works such as Moses at Mount Sinai, The Magical Well, Freedom at Large and Away, Yeegie Landscapes. He also completed a Scots translation of The Laxdæla Saga, rendered into verse. Three more collections of poetry were published – Referendum (1989), Concerning Lady Nairne and some of her Verses (1989) and The Clearances (1992). On his death in 1997, he left a sizeable body of work, published and unpublished, that is now housed at the National Library of Scotland. A volume of selected poems edited by Professor Tom Hubbard and John Law was published in 2008 (At the Pynt o The Pick and Other Poems).

== List of published works ==
=== Poetry collections ===
- Whit Tyme in the Day and Ither Poems (1948), Glasgow: The Caledonian Press
- Abbey Craig tae Stirling Castle (1974), Larkhall: Fingerpost Publicatiouns
- Aftentymes a Tinkler (1975), Larkhall: Fingerpost Publicatiouns
- Whyles a Targe (1975), Larkhall: Fingerpost Publicatiouns
- A Pryle o Aces (1977), Larkhall: Fingerpost Publicatiouns
- The N.C.O.’s (1980), Larkhall: Fingerpost Publicatiouns
- Referendum (1989), Larkhall: Fingerpost Publicatiouns Ltd
- Concerning Lady Nairne and some of her Verses (1989), Blackford: Fingerpost Publicatiouns Ltd
- The Clearances (1992), Blackford: Fingerpost Publicatiouns Ltd.
- At the Pynt o the Pick and Other Poems (2008), Blackford: Fingerpost Publicatiouns Ltd.

=== Edited books ===
- Homage to John MacLean (1973), The John MacLean Society
- The Socialist Poems of Hugh MacDiarmid (1978), London: Routledge & Kegan Paul

=== Audio recordings ===
- Poems of T.S. Law. [Set of 2 audiocassettes]. Read by Tom Hubbard [et al.]. Glasgow: Scotsoun, 1998: http://www.lallans.co.uk/
