= Scottish Workers' Republican Party =

- Abbreviation: SWRP
- Founder: John Maclean
- Founded: 1923 (first); 1974 (second)
- Dissolved: 1976
- Split from: CLP (first); SRSC (second)
- Merged into: SLP
- Ideology: Communism; Republicanism; Scottish nationalism
- Political position: Far-left

The Scottish Workers Republican Party (SWRP) was formed by the Scottish Marxist activist John Maclean (1879–1923) in 1923. It advocated the political doctrine of communism, whilst also supporting Scottish independence. This dual communist-nationalist doctrine was heavily influenced by the thinking of James Connolly who similarly believed in socialism and independence for Ireland and had set up his Irish Socialist Republican Party in 1896.

MacLean argued that the break-up of the British state and empire would aid the cause of worldwide socialism and thus he supported the idea of an independent Scotland. This inherent nationalism alienated the SWRP from the mainstream British left though. The SWRP carried on its political activity for some time after the death of MacLean in 1923 but never made any real impact politically.

An organisation which resurrected the name Scottish Workers Republican Party was formed in 1974 as a split from the Scottish Republican Socialist Clubs (forerunner of the Scottish Republican Socialist Party). In 1976 most of the members of the SWRP joined Jim Sillars' Scottish Labour Party and this SWRP Mark II party also became defunct.
