= Scottish Labour College =

The Scottish Labour College was founded in 1916, by John Maclean among others. It was modelled on the Central Labour College in London. It ran evening classes in Glasgow, Aberdeen, Dundee, Edinburgh and elsewhere.

Despite difficulties from continuing arrest and imprisonment, Maclean had been running lectures in Bath Street, Glasgow since 1912, and attracting audiences of between 100-200 people. In 1916 was decided to set up the College to organise more regular events. At the founding meeting 471 delegates representing 271 trade unions were present - but Maclean was in jail. However his speech was delivered by James Dunlop MacDougall, and soon published as a pamphlet: A Plea for a Labour College for Scotland: An Address Prepared By John MacLean and Completed By J D MacDougall During the Author's Imprisonment in 1916.

Attendees included Mary Brooksbank.

== See also ==
- Central Labour College
