= Shopped =

2004 book about the supermarket industry

- Front cover of Shopped
- Author: Joanna Blythman
- Language: English
- Genre: Non-fiction
- Publisher: Fourth Estate
- Publication date: 4 May 2004
- Publication place: United Kingdom
- Media type: Print (hardcover & paperback)
- Pages: 384 (first edition)
- ISBN: 978-0-00-715803-4
- OCLC: 56444289
- Followed by: Bad Food Britain

Shopped: The Shocking Power Of British Supermarkets is a book by British author and investigative journalist Joanna Blythman first published by Fourth Estate in 2004. Described by one reviewer as "an emotive and bitter attack on [Britain's] supermarket culture" the book examines the way supermarkets have changed "diets, cities, countryside and economy" in Britain and argues that consumers have unwittingly "surrendered control over what [they] eat to a few powerful chains." Along with Felicity Lawrence's Not On The Label (2004) and Colin Tudge's So Shall We Reap (2003), Shopped was seen by some critics as representing the frontline of the emerging, radical Slow Food movement in Europe. The book helped establish Blythman's reputation as "one of the most influential commentators" on British supermarkets. It was the winner of the Best Food Book prize at the 2005 Glenfiddich Food and Drink Awards and was shortlisted for the 2005 Guild of Food Writers' Awards.

== See also ==
- Consumerism
- Slow Food Nation
- The Wal-Mart Effect
