= Freddie Anderson (writer) =

Irish writer and socialist

Freddie Anderson (11 September 1922 – 10 December 2001) was an Irish writer, playwright, author, poet and socialist, born in Ballybay, County Monaghan, Ireland, who became an influential figure in left wing culture and folk music scene in Glasgow from the 1950s until his death in 2001.

== Biography ==
In 1942, Anderson joined the Royal Air Force (RAF) at a time when some Irishmen signed up out of idealism, but more joined in order to send money home to struggling families. He was posted to a radar station at Crossmaglen, County Armagh, Northern Ireland but also worked in India and Burma. Around this time, he met his wife, Isobel, whom he married in 1951. Upon demobilisation in 1946, he moved to her native Glasgow, Scotland, a city he took to instantly although his work continued to be influenced by his beloved County Monaghan.

In 1947 he joined Glasgow Unity Theatre, effectively launching a career which saw him become a valuable player in Glasgow's left-wing artistic life. He later recalled that an encounter in Sauchiehall Street when he introduced himself to Roddy McMillan set everything in train. McMillan took the young Irishman into Craig's Restaurant and bought him a cup of tea and Anderson found his spiritual home at the Unity Centre. His first play, Thirty Three Years, was produced by the Glasgow Unity Theatre in the late 1940s. His literary work in the Easterhouse community in Glasgow where he lived was recognised by an Irish Post award. As a playwright, his 1979 work Krassivy about Scottish leftist politician John Maclean won a Fringe First award at the Edinburgh Festival Fringe.

Anderson became well known on the Glasgow political/socialist/Scottish/Irish/International Republican scene. His poetry, stories, plays and songs all reflected his Celtic charm, blending Scottish and Irish history and culture in an anti-sectarian manner. As a poet of the oral tradition, his work could sometimes lapse into sentimentality but at his best his lyrics had the same insight as other fellow Monaghan poets such as Patrick Kavanagh.

Late in life he finally produced the book which drew together all his attributes. Oiney Hoy, a tale of the wanderings of a green fool, toys with Ireland's myths, stereotypes, pretensions, and foibles, a gentle but effective satire which also translated with great success on to the Edinburgh Fringe stage. Towards the end of his life, Anderson had been preparing the further adventures of Oiney and was working on an autobiography. But the illness with which he struggled for more than 20 years caught up with him in 2001, two years after he lost his wife and companion, Isobel.

== Works ==
- Fowrsom Reel with John Kincaid, George Todd and Thurso Berwick, (Glasgow 1949)
- The Last of the People's Palaces, in Hearn, Sheila G. (ed.), Cencrastus No. 14, Autumn 1983, pp. 17 - 19, ISSN 0264-0856
- Oiney Hoy, Polygon, Edinburgh, 1989, ISBN 9780748660346

== Research collection ==
Glasgow's Caledonian University Library houses the Freddie Anderson collection.
