= Bo'ness Rebels Literary Society =

Bo'ness Rebels Literary Society (known as Bo'ness Rebels Literary Club until they began to publish songbooks in the early 1950s), was a Scottish nationalist organisation, and song collective, operating in Bo'ness, Scotland, between 1948 and 1976, with close links to the Scottish National Party, and its (now defunct) publications department. It was chaired by Mr William Kellock, who was an officer at the bank of Scotland in the town. Following their inaugural event in January 1948, they held events roughly every fews months, which were frequented by many famous Scots associated with the advancement of Scottish independence, the Scottish Renaissance and the Scottish Folk Revival. Namely Thurso Berwick, Hamish Henderson, Hugh MacDiarmid, Wendy Wood, Hugh MacDonald and Dr. Robert Mcintyre, among others. They continued to publish song books until late 1966.

== History ==
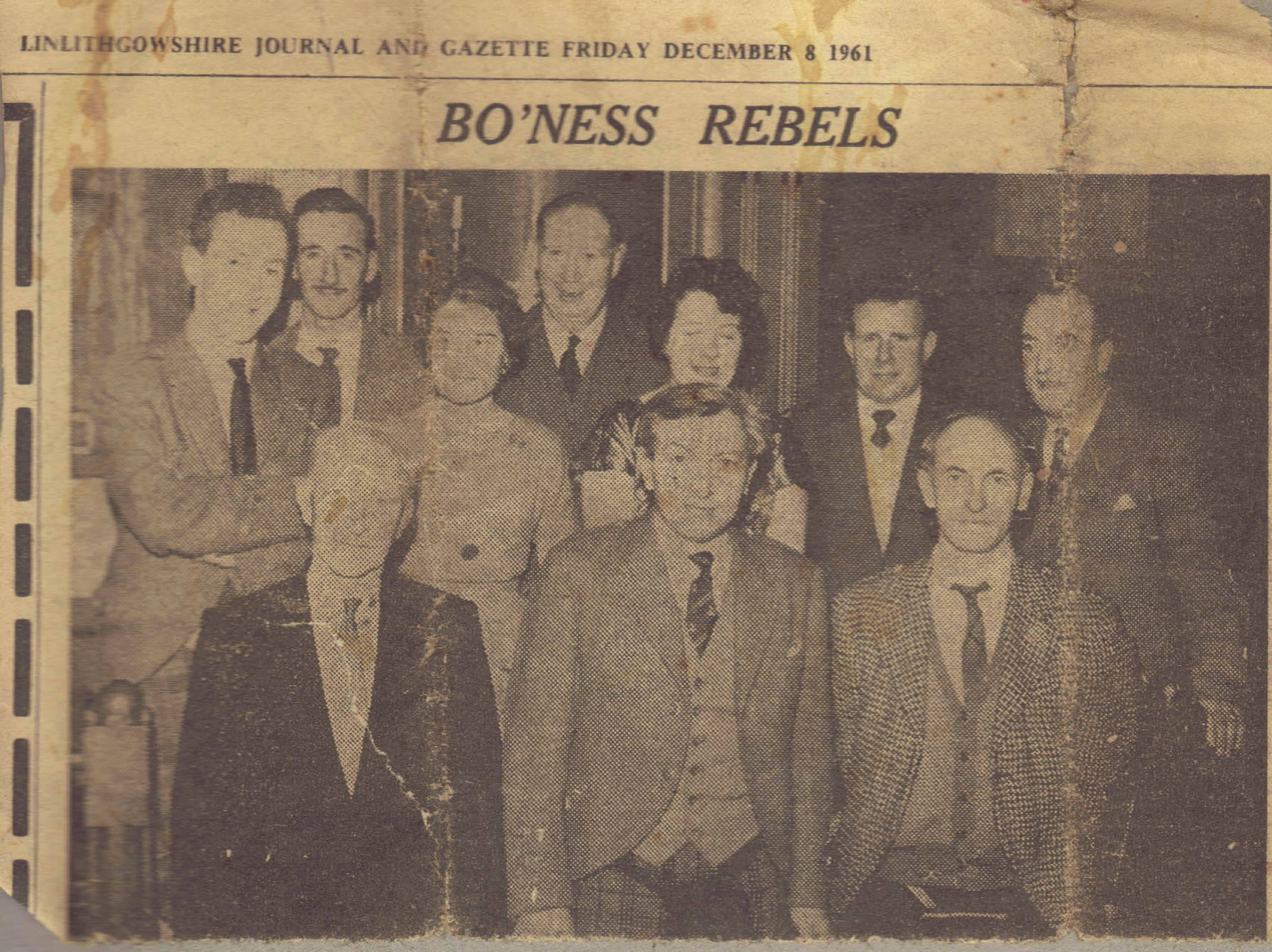
A photo of some of those involved in the Bo'ness Rebels. Featuring Hugh MacDonald (second from left in back row) and chairperson William Kellock (furthest on right, front row)

The earliest record of the society is recorded on the 30 January 1948 in the Bo’ness Journal, which details “Visitors from as far away as Scalpay off Harris, Lochinver and Dornoch were present at the first social function by the newly formed ‘rebels’ Literary club in Bo’ness - a burns supper in the coffee house (a restaurant in the town). William Kellock explained that he had gathered together talent from the four corners of Scotland to honour the national bard and Scotland's cultural heritage before and since his day. The night followed the usual Burns nicht pattern, at the conclusion of which the affiliations of the organisers were made clear. Mr. Clancy, Headmaster at Armadale Academy stated that he had come in loyalty to the Scottish National Party, and had been overwhelmed and delighted with the musical and cultural fare provided." They continued to hold ceilidhs after this, either in the Viewforth hotel on the Wynd, in the Douglas Masonic lodge on Stewart Avenue, or Bo'ness Miners Welfare on Harbour Road, as well as a couple of other places

== Publications ==
- The Rebels Ceilidh Song Book (Early 50s) - Features 35 songs. Including Bo'ness specific ones like 'The ballad o' the Learig', also songs made popular by the Glasgow Song Guild like Coronation Coronach (the Scottish Breakaway), as well as more well known songs traditionally associated with Harry Lauder, Andy Stewart, The Alexander Brothers and the like, for example Nicky Tams, Barnyards O' Delgaty, and Johnnie Lad. There are also three songs in Scottish Gaelic. The first edition of the book was printed at Type Composing Co., 17 Claremont Street, Glasgow, C.3. The Second Edition of the Rebels Ceilidh songbook has the same song collection as the first edition, however with advertisements and noticeable links to the SNP. For example, it was for sale at the party's headquarters, which at that time was at 59 Elmbank Street, Glasgow, C.2. It also features numerous advertisements promoting "Support Scottish Industry, Buy Scottish goods", as well as political advertisements. Even apolitical advertisements in the book are promoted on behalf of businesses by people known to be supporters of the SNP, for example Angus McGillveray Painter and Decorator of Bathgate, has an advertisement placed. McGillveray ran the SNP publications department from 1964 until his retirement in 1995.
- Patriot Songs for Camp and Ceilidh (Mid to late 50s) - 35 different songs. For the first time mentions frequenters of the societies events, and contributions of Morris Blythman, Hamish Henderson, Norman McCaig, and Wendy Wood.
- The Rebels Ceilidh Song Book No. 2 (1965) - 34 different songs, in Welsh, Irish and Scots (No Gaelic - also omission of Uisdean Mac Dhomnaill following the preface as was the case in the other editions - this is Gaelic for Hugh Macdonald. This suggests Hugh's primary contribution in the former books was the Gaelic songs, as there is no Gaelic whatsoever in this, their final publication.) This edition also mentions Angus McGillveray as the primary address for the SNP's publications department. It also advertises single poems for sale by the Rebels Society, including Hugh MacDiarmid's "A drunk man looks at the thistle" and Norman McCaig's works, obtainable from "Shonna" on Dean Road in Bo'ness. (presumably a house name) There are no surviving copies of these.
- Rebel Ceilidh Song Book 67 (1966) - a reprint of the above book with Hugh MacDiarmid's caricature in the shape of a thistle on the front cover.

== Ambiguity around publishing dates ==
The preface to ‘The rebels ceilidh song book No. 2’, states that their first publication, 'The rebels Ceilidh song book' was published in 1951/2, however it includes the song ‘Ballad of the Learig bar’, and the Learig bar did not get its license and thus was unable to open until 9/10/1953. It also features songs referencing the postbox bombings in Inch, ‘The ballad of the inch’, ’Sky-High Joe’ and ‘Sky-High pantomime’, which didn't happen until 1953. So their first book must have been published on or after 1953.

== Links to the organisation from the town ==
There are numerous advertisements in their published works, most of which are related to business' in Bo'ness. Interestingly, it is likely the Bo'ness Rebels Literary Society collected their advertisements from people who were SNP supporters, as is evident through the following examples;

The most apparent of these is the Learig bar of Dean Road to which, a 27 verse poem is dedicated in 'The Rebels Ceilidh Song Book'. By the time of their final publication, the poem had 32 verses.

The Learig bar was owned by Charles Auld, next to his grocers often referred to as "Chairlie P's" in reference to him, on Dean Road in Bo'ness. All of the rebels songbooks were sold there, according to their preface's. Auld was a nationalist, as was his brother, according to the ballad. The "elbow room" is mentioned, a quiet room in the pub. According to Bo'ness SNP councillor Harry Constable in Ewan Macvicor's 'The Eskimo Republic' "It wasn't a concert ceilidh, it was almost like a debating society. We had people from the Labour Party, communists, left wing socialists, nationalists, it was remarkable. But not only left wingers. Discussions took place, and I believe a lot of people learned a lot." However, former Labour MP and teacher at Bo'ness Academy Tam Dalyell, were also welcome, as was former Bo'ness town provost Charlie Sneddon, and both are mentioned in the 32 verse version of the poem in 'The rebels Ceilidh song book No. 2'. Indeed, the opening preface to the first book states "This Book is Labour, it is Nationalist, it is Tory in the original sense of the word" - so perhaps it is not as partisan as it would initially appear.

On page 30 of 'The rebels Ceilidh Song Book' there is an advertisement for Willie Ross Jewellers on north street. Willie Ross was a group scout master in the town, and a jeweller, as well as being known for being in the SNP. He also did Baritone singing at the Rebels Ceilidhs.

On the same page, as well as numerous times throughout the Bo'ness Rebels books, there is an advertisement for the Viewforth hotel. The Viewforth hotel, now shut, was on the Church Wynd. The Bo'ness rebels literary society held ceilidhs there, for example in July 1949, when the Bo'ness Journal states "The Bo'ness Rebels Literary Club held a smokers ceilidh in the Viewforth hotel, in honour of Councillor William Horne, first Bo'ness Councillor to be elected under the banner of Scotland's National Party". This suggests that there were sympathetic individuals working for or in ownership of the Viewforth at this time.

The Lino-Cuts on the front cover of the books were done by Jimmy Dewar who was an art teacher at Linlithgow Academy.

== Links to the organisation from the Scottish National Party ==
The books were published by the SNP's publications department, following the second edition of the first book.

On page one of said book, there is an 'Obtainable from' heading, which mentions all the places the book can be bought from, including the Learig, William Kellock of Bo'ness, Glasgow Song Guild, Angus Mcgillvery of the SNPs publications department, but also the SNP's headquarters on 59 Elmbank Street Glasgow. All their following publications are the same.

An advertisement for Angus Mcgillveray's painting and decorating business' features on page 39 of the first songbook, and again in the following additions.

There are numerous political advertisements in their publications.

== Legacy ==
Simon Mckerrel of Newcastle University argues that Bo'ness is one of the key sites in the history of the folk revival in Scotland. He makes the point that this growth in the 1950s and 1960s may have been instrumental in the upsurge of Scottish nationalism during this time which ultimately led to the 1979 referendum. The Bo'ness Rebels are often cited in books looking at the Scottish folk revival.

On 17 February 2011, the ‘Lets Get Lyrical’ festival in Edinburgh, featured a show called ‘Rebel Shenanigans’, which was an event which would “re-create the sounds of the Bo’ness Rebels Ceilidhs of the 1950s, a movement in favour of a Scottish Republic.”

In 2016, a show called “From Thurso to Berwick” celebrating the songs and poetry of Morris Blythman (aka Thurso Berwick) who wrote many of the songs in the Ceilidh Songbooks was put on at the Scottish Storytelling centre in . He also wrote the ‘Sangs O the Stane’ songbook which as mentioned earlier was available in Bo’ness. Blythman was also behind a lot of the Republican songs associated with the Glesga Song Guild. Alastair McDonald was the main musician involved in this show and in the subsequent year of 2017 released a CD with nineteen of Blythman's tracks on it.

In 2017, Alastair McDonald released the album "The Rebels Ceilidh" which features a nineteen songs which were in the Songbooks, mostly ones contributed by Morris Blythman. The front cover also features Jimmy Dewar's illustration from the front cover of "The Rebels Ceilidh Song Book No.2"

The Original Rebels Ceilidh Song Book and Rebels Ceilidh Song Book No.2 sit in the Library of Congress Washington DC. The first book is also available in the New York Public Library system.
