= Tarujen Saari =

Finnish folk-rock group

Tarujen Saari is a Finnish folk-rock group. They are known for playing songs (for example The Three Ravens) from a variety of European folk traditions (often Celtic, Viking, and associated subgenres), as well as original compositions. Tarujen Saari employs a wide variety of instruments, many of which are traditional or Renaissance-era. Their lyrics are entirely in Finnish, with many songs being translated from the original language. Tarujen Saari's hard rock elements and "heroic" Viking style lyrics lead to them being categorized as playing Viking metal or "Viking rock". The name of the band, Tarujen Saari (The Island of Sagas), refers to Ireland. The band's female vocalist, Kaisa Saari, was featured on Ensiferum's album Iron on the song "Tears."

== Discography ==
=== Albums ===
- Miltähän Tuo Tuntuisi (1997)
- Helmiä ja kuparikolikoita (Pearls and Copper Coins) (1998)
- Hepsankeikka (Flibbertygibbet) (2000)
- Tarujen Saari (The Island of Sagas) (2001)
- Levoton hauta (The Unquiet Grave) (2002)
- Sota kirottu! (Damned War!) (2004)
- Susien yö - Delirium Lupus (Night of the Wolves) (2006)

=== Singles/EPs ===
- "Katariina Karhunhammas" (1999) – EP
- "Rattaanpyörä" (2003) – Single
- "Moonshine" (2022) - EP
