= The Wee German Lairdie =

Scottish Jacobite song

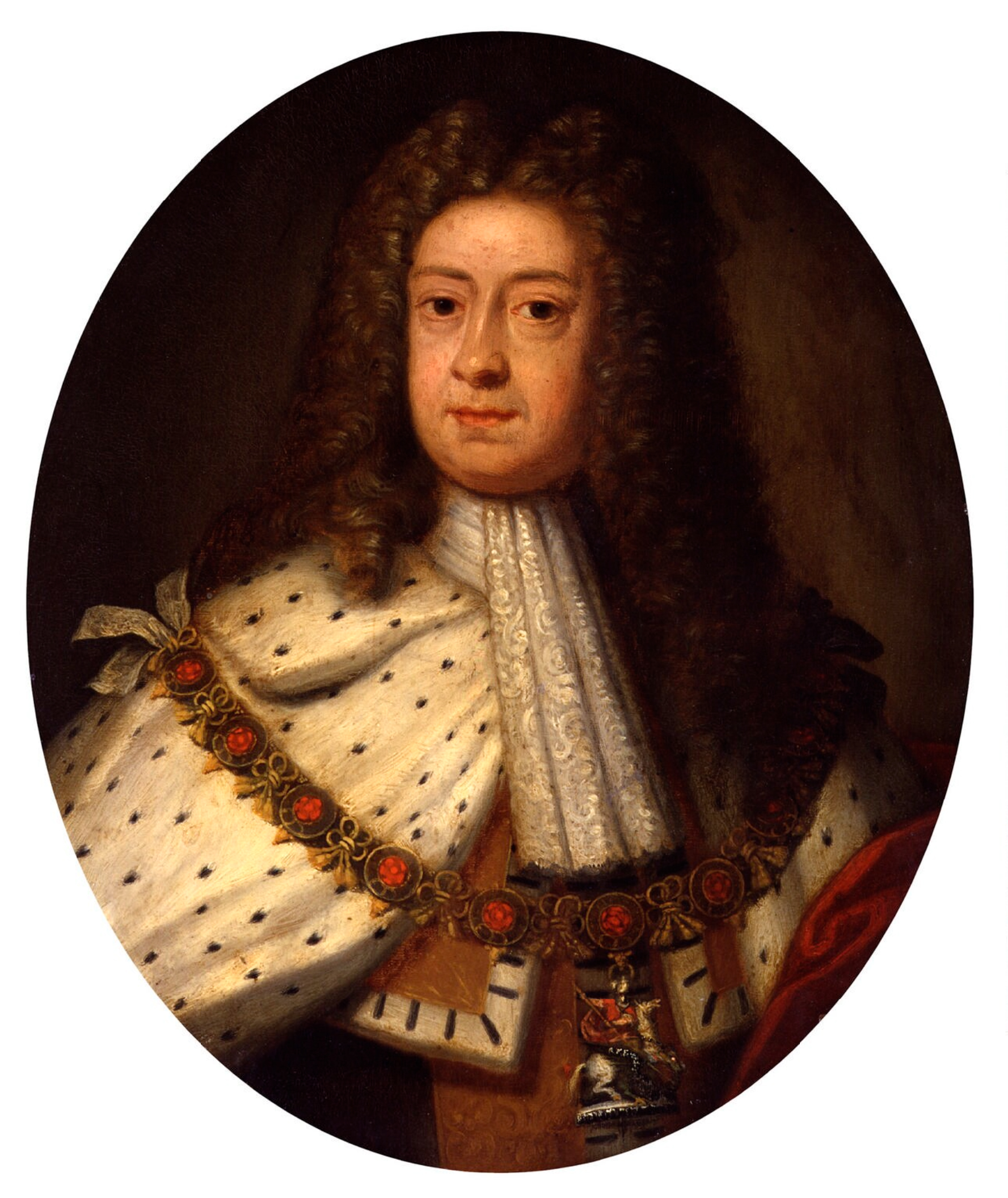
- George I of Great Britain, whom the song most likely mocked. Painted after Sir Godfrey Kneller, based on a work c. 1714.

Song
- Language: Scots
- Written: Late 18th or early 19th century

"The Wee German Lairdie" (Roud 2573) is a Scottish folk song that is probably about George I of Great Britain. The king, ridiculed in this song, assumed power to the discontent of the Jacobite rebels, who instead recognised James Francis Edward Stuart as king, from the formerly ruling House of Stuart. Though taking place around 1715, the song first appears in writing in 1810, in Robert Cromek and Allan Cunningham's Remains of Nithsdale and Galloway Song, recalling a song of several versions that was allegedly sung prior. James Hogg, however, mentions "an older collection" in the first volume of his 1819 compilation The Jacobite Relics of Scotland.

According to The Jacobite Relics, the song was "sung to many different tunes in different districts of the kingdom". Hogg claimed that the most popular tune at the time was the one written by him, but printed alongside it an older tune which he described as "more in character".

== Background ==
The Jacobites had been present in Britain and Ireland since the deposition of James VII & II of Stuart for William III & II of Orange-Nassau, the former being a convert to Catholicism, to the antipathy of ardent protestants in English parliament. Along with Catholics all across the realm, the cause for a continued Stuart monarchy became particularly popular in Scotland, whence that house originated. Recovering from an infamous massacre of dissenters, defeats in battle, and laws put in place to restrict Catholicism in the kingdoms and from the crown, the Jacobite standard was raised once again in 1714 on the ascension of George I to the British and Irish thrones.

The Elector of Hanover, George I came from the Holy Roman Empire to a new land of which he was now king, was alleged to have spoken only a minimal amount of English. The song suggests he was an avid gardener, something that isn't commonly (if at all) attested of him in surviving literature.

The notion of the song ridiculing George I in particular comes from its mid-19th century publications and commentary thereof. Though unlikely, the time between the death of George I in 1727 and the song's first verified written appearance in 1810 suggests the possibility of it actually being about said king's son and successor, George II, involved in the Jacobite Rising of 1745.

== Lyrics ==
The following Scots original is the song as it appears in James Hogg's Jacobite Relics of Scotland.

Wha the deil hae we gotten for a king,
But a wee wee German lairdie?
And when we gade to bring him hame,
He was delving in his kail-yardie;
Sheughing kail, and laying leeks,
Without the hose, and but the breeks;
And up his beggar duds he cleeks,
The wee wee German lairdie.

And he's clappit down in our gudeman's chair,
The wee wee German lairdie,
And he's brought forth o' foreign trash, (Note: Nithsdale and Galloway reads "foreign leeks")
And dibbled them in his yardie.
He's pu'd the rose o' English loons,
And broken the harp o' Irish clowns,
But our Scots thristle will jag his thumbs,
The wee wee German lairdie

Come up amang our Highland hills,
Thou wee wee German lairdie,
And see how the Stuarts' lang-kail thrive,
They dibbled in our yardie;
And if a stock ye dare to pu',
Or haud the yoking o' a plough,
We'll break your sceptre o'er your mou',
Thou wee bit German lairdie!

Our hills are steep, our glens are deep,
Nae fitting for a yardie;
And our norland thristles winna pu',
For a wee bit German lairdie;
And we've the trenching blades o' weir,
Wad glib ye o' your German gear,
And pass ye 'neath the claymore's sheer,
Thou feckless German lairdie!

Auld Scotland, thou'rt o'er cauld a hole
For nursing siccan vermin;
But the very dogs o' England's court,
They bark and howl in German.
Then keep thy dibble i' thy ain hand,
Thy spade but and thy yardie;
For wha the deil now claims your land,
But a wee wee German lairdie?

Translation:

Who the hell do we have for a king,
But a little German lordling?
And when we went to bring him home,
He was delving in his kale-garden;
Planting kale and laying leeks,
Without the stockings, nor the trousers;
And in his beggar rags he thieves,
The little German lordling.

And he's sat down in our good man's chair,
The little German lordling,
And he's brought forth the foreign trash,
And planted them in his garden.
He's pruned the rose of English loons,
And broken the harp of Irish clowns,
But our Scots thistle will prick his thumbs,
The little German lording.

Come upon our Highland hills,
You little German lordling,
And see the Stuart's long kale thrive,
They planted in our garden;
And if you dare to cut a tree,
Or keep yoking a plow,
We'll break your sceptre over your mouth,
You little German lordling!

Our hills are steep, our glens are deep,
Unfit for a garden;
And our northland thistles won't come out,
For a little German lordling;
And we have the trenching blades of war,
Would slip you out of your German gear,
And pass you beneath the claymore's shear,
You feckless German lordling!

Old Scotland, you're too cold a hole
For nursing such vermin;
But the very dogs of England's court,
They bark and howl in German.
So keep your dibble in your own hand,
Your spade out of your garden;
For who the hell now claims your land,
But a little German lordling?

== Recordings ==
- Ewan MacColl – Popular Scottish Songs, 1961
- Nigel Denver – Rebellion!, 1967
- Alastair McDonald – Scottish Battle Ballads, 1973
- Five Hand Reel – Five Hand Reel, 1976
- Jean Redpath – The Songs of Robert Burns, Volumes 5 & 6, 1985
- Old Blind Dogs – New Tricks, 1992
