= Tom Hubbard =

- Born: 1950 (age 75–76); Kirkcaldy, Scotland, United Kingdom
- Education: University of Aberdeen (PhD)

Tom Hubbard FCLIP (born 1950) was the first librarian of the Scottish Poetry Library and is the author, editor or co-editor of over thirty academic and literary works.

== Biography ==
Tom Hubbard was born in Kirkcaldy.

After obtaining first class honours (MA, PhD) from Aberdeen University and a Diploma in Librarianship from Strathclyde University, Hubbard worked at the Scottish Poetry Library (1984–1992) and as a visiting lecturer at the universities of Grenoble, Connecticut, Budapest (Faculty of Sciences of the Eötvös Loránd University), and North Carolina (at Asheville).

From 2000 to 2004, he was editor of BOSLIT (Bibliography of Scottish Literature in Translation), a research project of Edinburgh University, based at the National Library of Scotland. He is also an honorary research fellow in the Department of Scottish Literature, University of Glasgow (2004–2007), an honorary fellow in the School of Literatures, Languages and Cultures, University of Edinburgh (2005–2008), and Fellow of the Chartered Institute of Library and Information Professionals (FCLIP) (elected 2006).

In 2006, Hubbard was visiting professor in Scottish Literature and Culture at the University of Budapest (ELTE). Thereafter, he edited the Online Bibliography of Irish Literary Criticism (BILC) at the National University of Ireland, Maynooth (2006–2010) and in December 2009 he was appointed the Lynn Wood Neag Distinguished Visiting professor of British Literature, University of Connecticut for the Spring Semester of 2011. In 2011/12 Hubbard was Professeur invité at Stendhal University, Grenoble, and a Writer-in-residence at the Château Lavigny in Vaud, Switzerland.

Hubbard is on the editorial board of the journal Scottish Affairs, and an honorary visiting fellow at the University of Edinburgh Institute of Governance, where he is working on a "Scotland and Europe" project with Dr Eberhard Bort.

== Bibliography ==
- Revaluation: R.B. Cunninghame Graham, in Murray, Glen (ed.), Cencrastus No. 8, Spring 1982, pp. 27 – 30, ISSN 0264-0856
- review of The Scottish Sketches of R.B. Cunninghame Graham, edited by John Walker, in Hearn, Sheila G. (ed.), Cencrastus No. 10, Autumn 1982, p. 42, ISSN 0264-0856
- with John Brewster, William Hershaw and Harvey Holton Four Fife Poets: Fower Brigs ti a Kinrik (Aberdeen University Press, 1988) ISBN 0080364179
- The New Makars: Anthology of Contemporary Poetry in Scots (Edinburgh: Mercat Press, 1991) ISBN 090182495X
- Seeking Mr. Hyde: Studies in Robert Louis Stevenson, Symbolism, Myth and the Pre-Modern (Scottish studies) (Peter Lang Publishing, 1995) ISBN 3631491077
- Integrative Vision: Poetry and the Visual Arts in Baudelaire, Rilke and MacDiarmid (Akros Publications, 1997) ISBN 0861420713
- with Thomas Rain Crowe and Gwendal Denez, A Celtic Resurgence: The New Celtic Poetry (Writing the Wind) (New Native Press, 1997) ISBN 1883197120
- Isolde's Luve-daith: Poems in English and Scots (Akros Publications, 1998) ISBN 0861420950
- with William Soutar and Sheila Cant, A Bairn's Sang and Other Poems (Mercat Press, 1999) ISBN 1873644981
- From Soda Fountain to Moonshine Mountain: American Poems (Akros Publications, 2004) ISBN 0861421531
- Scottish Faust: Poems and Ballads of Eldritch Lore (Kettillonia, 2004) ISBN 1902944186
- with Zsuzsanna Varga, Anthology of Scottish poetry translated into Hungarian (2006)
- with RDS Jack, Scotland in Europe (SCROLL: Scottish Cultural Review of Language & Literature) (Editions Rodopi B.V., 2006) ISBN 9042021004
- Michael Scot: Myth and Polymath (Akros Publications, 2006) ISBN 0861421728
- Border Crossings: Twelve Contemporary Writers from Scotland (Scottish PEN, 2007)
- Peacocks and Squirrels: Poems of Fife (Kirkcaldy: Akros Publications, 2007) ISBN 0861421841
- with Duncan Glen, A Fringe of Gold: The Fife Anthology (Edinburgh: Birlinn, 2008) ISBN 1841587044
- with T. S. Law and John Law, At the Pynt o the Pick and Other Poems (Fingerpost Publicatiouns, 2008) ISBN 0950410683
- Marie B: A Biographical Novel (Kirkcaldy: Ravenscraig Press, 2008) ISBN 0-9556559-1-9
- with Ralph Pite, Rikky Rooksby and Edward Wakeling Lives of Victorian Literary Figures: Pt. VI: Lewis Carroll, Robert Louis Stevenson and Algernon Charles Swinburne by Their Contemporaries (Pickering & Chatto, 2008) ISBN 1851969055
- with Ralph Pite, Keith Carabine and Lindy Stiebel, Lives of Victorian Literary Figures: Pt. VII: Joseph Conrad, Henry Rider Haggard and Rudyard Kipling by Their Contemporaries (Pickering & Chatto, 2009) ISBN 1851969632
- The Chagall Winnocks: Wi Ither Scots Poems and Ballants O Europe (Grace Note Publications, 2011) ISBN 1907676201
- The Nyaff and Other Poems (Windfall Books, 2012) ISBN 095572645X
- Parapets and Labyrinths: Poems in English and Scots on European Themes (Grace Note Publications, 2013) ISBN 1907676236
- Poetry of Baudelaire (Critical Insights) (Salem Pr Inc, 2014) ISBN 161925395X
- The Lucky Charm of Major Bessop (Grace Note Publications, 2014) ISBN 1907676481

== Theatre ==
Hubbard read the role of one of the old shepherds in the Merchants o Renoun presentation of Allan Ramsay's The Gentle Shepherd staged at the Netherbow Theatre, Edinburgh, on Thursday 26th and Saturday 28th November 1998.
