= Celtic Communism =

Celtic Communism, also called Gaelic primitive communism, is a form of Marxism developed by John Maclean and James Connolly strongly influenced by Pan-Celticism, Irish nationalism and Scottish nationalism.

== Ideas and Influence ==
Connolly regarded socialism and nationalism to be inextricably linked. He principally argued for socialism to be fought for alongside national liberation, not after. Connolly also believed that anti-imperialist nationalism could be expressed alongside internationalist Marxism. Connolly went as far as to argue that nationalism could not exist in any form unless it was socialist and a criticism of capitalism.

Connolly argued the presence of primitive communism among Gaelic clans, and Celtic society in explaining societal development. Connolly's arguments were said to be derived from The Origin of the Family, Private Property and the State by Friedrich Engels. Connolly argued this to help refute claims that Gaelic society, and by extension contemporary Irish people, were inherently aristocratic. In his analysis he further sees the destruction of Gaelic Ireland and colonialism as directly tied to capitalism arriving in Ireland. Connolly's ideas were also inspired by Vladimir Lenin's critique of colonialism.

On the theoretical basis of Celtic Communism, David Lloyd states that "[James Connolly's] historical work is understood as an intervention designed to rewrite a history of which the Irish people have become ignorant". He also points out how Connolly argued that a memory of a different system exists among the peasantry in Ireland. Lloyd states this as the "more substantial claim" and also gives weight to Connolly's idea that Irish leaders hadn't "ever been able to take from the peasantry the possession of traditions which kept alive in their midst the memory of the common ownership and common control of land by their ancestors".

John Maclean similarly reconciled the ideas of socialism and nationalism but in Scotland, and was stated by Owen Dudley Edwards to be one of the "immediate heirs" of Connolly's ideas. Maclean, however, was personally closer with Jim Larkin.

== Criticism and Legacy ==
The idea of Celtic Communism has been criticised as romanticised, which has reasoned as being because: "'Celtic communism' lends itself potentially to an idealizing nationalism that seeks to trace in the past the contours of a benevolent and undegraded national spirit."

Writers like Hugh MacDiarmid were inspired by James Connolly's work, and writer James Kelman has acknowledged Connolly and John MacLean as being part of a lost history of left-wing nationalism in the 20th century.

Connolly's Re-conquest of Ireland and Maclean's All Hail, the Scottish Workers Republic are seen as important works on Celtic Communism.
