= The Three Ravens =

English folk ballad

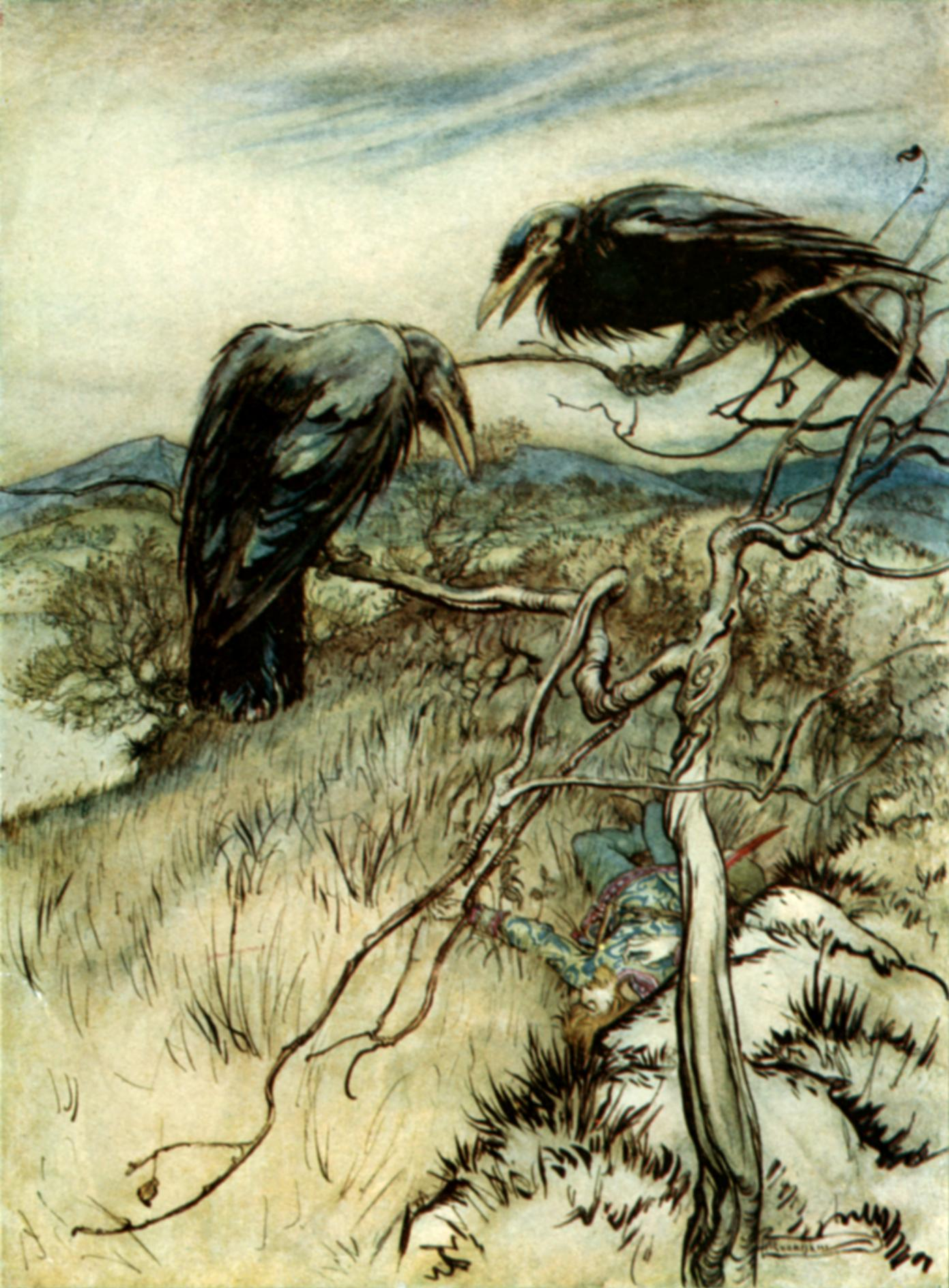
- "The Twa Corbies", illustration by Arthur Rackham for Some British Ballads

Song
- Published: 1611
- Genre: English folk ballad

"The Three Ravens" (Roud 5, Child 26) is an English folk ballad, printed in the songbook Melismata compiled by Thomas Ravenscroft and published in 1611, but the song is possibly older than that. Newer versions (with different music) were recorded up through the 19th century. Francis James Child recorded several versions in his Child Ballads (catalogued as number 26).

The ballad centers three scavenger birds conversing about where and what they should eat. One tells the others of a newly slain knight, but they find he is guarded by his loyal hawks and hounds. Furthermore, a "fallow doe", a metaphor for the knight's pregnant ("as great with young as she might go") lover or mistress (see "leman") comes to his body, kisses his wounds, bears him away, and buries him, leaving the ravens without a meal. The narrative ends with "God send euery gentleman / Such haukes, such hounds, and such a Leman".

== Text of the ballad ==
These lyrics to "The Three Ravens" are transcribed using 1611 orthography. They can be sung either straight through in stanzas of four lines each, or in stanzas of two lines each repeating the first line three times, depending on how long the performer would like the ballad to last. The second method appears to be more canonical, so it is what is illustrated below. The refrains are sung in all stanzas, but they are only shown here for the first.

There were three rauens (Note: In printed text of the time, u and v were often used interchangeably.) sat on a tree,
downe a downe, hay downe, hay downe, (Note: The refrain consists of nonsense words that create a vocal musical interlude between lines of the stanza. See Puirt a beul.)
There were three rauens sat on a tree,
with a downe,
There were three rauens sat on a tree,
They were as blacke as they might be.
With a downe, derrie, derrie, derrie, downe, downe.

The one of them said to his mate,
Where shall we our breakfast take?

Downe in yonder greene field,
There lies a Knight slain under his shield,

His hounds they lie downe at his feete,
So well they can their Master keepe,

His Hawkes they flie so eagerly,
There's no fowle dare him come nie (Note: Nie: Variant of nigh.)

Downe there comes a fallow Doe,
As great with yong as she might goe,

She lift up his bloudy head,
And kist his wounds that were so red,

She got him up upon her backe,
And carried him to earthen lake, (Note: Lake: Pit.)

She buried him before the prime, (Note: Prime, Euen-song: see Canonical hours.)
She was dead her self ere euen-song time.

God send euery gentleman,
Such haukes, such hounds, and such a Leman. (Note: Leman: Sweetheart or mistress)

== The Twa Corbies ==
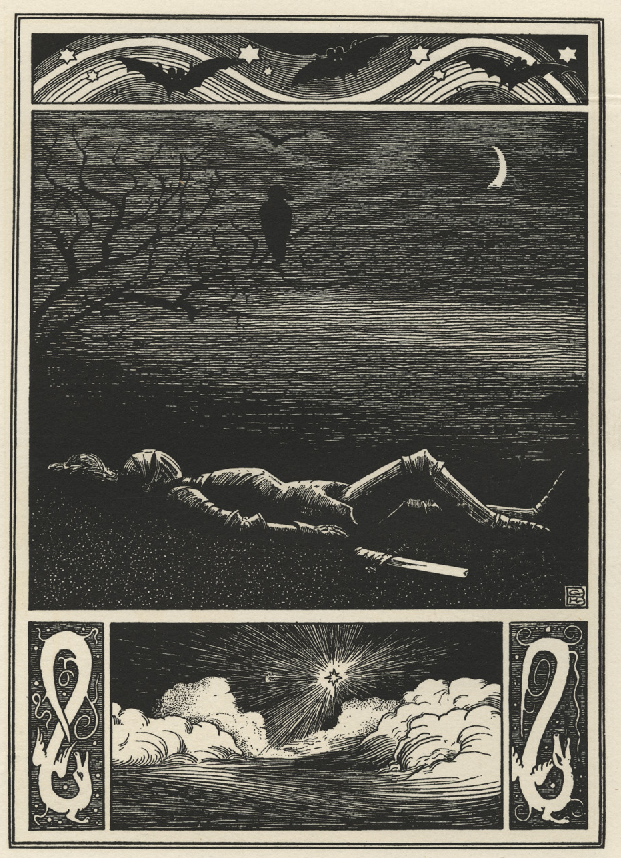
The Twa Corbies, illustration by G. Howell-Baker, from his book Penholm (1901)

It is written in the Scots language, and there is no record of how early "The Twa Corbies" was first performed. Child (I, 253) quotes a letter from Charles Kirkpatrick Sharpe to Walter Scott (August 8, 1802): "The song of 'The Twa Corbies' was given to me by Miss Erskine of Alva (now Mrs Kerr), who, I think, said that she had written it down from the recitation of an old woman at Alva." This indicates that it was already known in Scotland at that date. It was first published in Walter Scott's Minstrelsy of the Scottish Border in 1803.

It has a more dark and cynical tone than the Three Ravens, from which its lyrics were clearly derived. There are only two scavengers in “The Twa Corbies”, but they begin the same way. Rather than commenting on the loyalty of the knight's beasts, the corbies see that the hawk and the hound have forsaken their master, and are off chasing other game, while his mistress has already taken another lover. The ravens are therefore given an undisturbed meal, as nobody else knows where the man lies, or even that he is dead. They talk in gruesome detail about the meal they will make of him, plucking out his eyes and using his hair for their nests. It contains themes of the fragility of life, life going on after death, and a more pessimistic viewpoint on life. The loneliness and despair of the song are summed up in the final couplets;

O'er his banes [bones], when they are bare,
The wind sall [shall] blaw for evermair

There are a few different versions of this anonymously authored poem. The full text of at least one version of the poem is as follows:

As I was walking all alane, (Note: alone)
I heard twa (Note: two) corbies (Note: carrion crows) making a mane; (Note: moan)
The tane (Note: one) unto the t'other say,
‘Where sall we gang and dine to-day?’

‘In behint yon auld fail (Note: turf) dyke,
I wot (Note: know) there lies a new slain knight;
And naebody kens (Note: knows) that he lies there,
But his hawk, his hound, and lady fair.

‘His hound is to the hunting gane, (Note: gone)
His hawk to fetch the wild-fowl hame, (Note: home)
His lady's taen (Note: taken) another mate,
So we may mak our dinner sweet.

‘Ye'll sit on his white hause-bane, (Note: breast bone)
And I'll pike (Note: peck) out his bonny blue een; (Note: eyes)
Wi ae lock o his gowden (Note: with a lock of his golden) hair
We'll theek (Note: feather) our nest when it grows bare.

‘Mony (Note: many) a one for him makes mane, (Note: a moan)
But nane sall ken (Note: none shall know) where he is gane; (Note: gone)
Oer (Note: over) his white banes, (Note: bones) when they are bare,
The wind sall blaw (Note: shall blow) for evermair. (Note: evermore)’

This ballad was one of 25 traditional works included in Ballads Weird and Wonderful (1912), illustrated by Vernon Hill.

== In popular culture ==
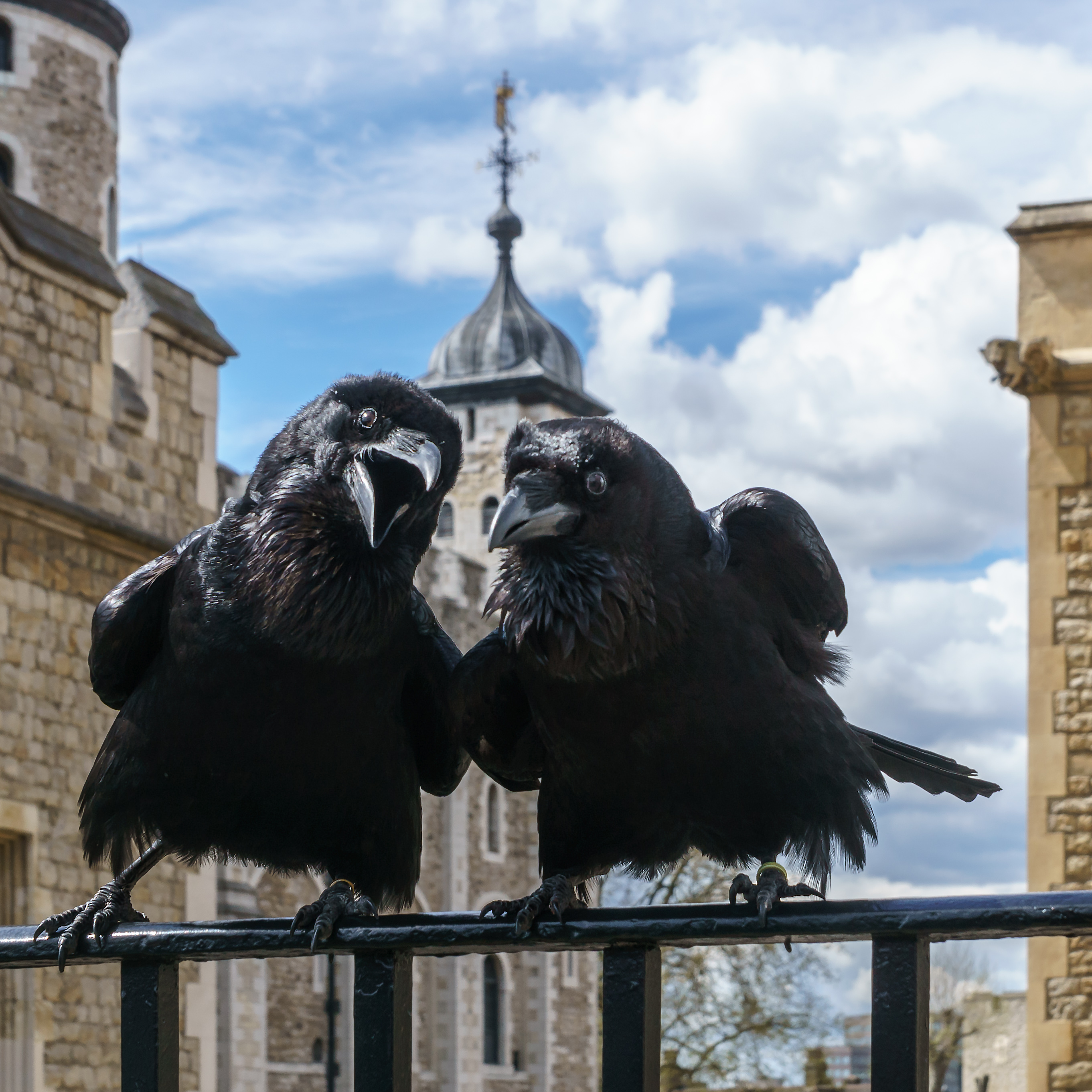
Jubilee and Munin, "Twa Corbies" of the Tower of London.

- The popular American rock band The Horrible Crowes takes its name from "Twa Corbies”.
- The song is featured in The Adventure Company's game Jack the Ripper and plays a major role in the gameplay.
- The song is mentioned in Diana Gabaldon's novel The Fiery Cross, when Roger MacKenzie encounters some crows in the woods.
- Oli Steadman included it on his song collection "365 Days Of Folk". (2026).
- The song appears in the 1922 fantasy novel The Worm Ouroboros by E. R. Eddison, sung by the Lady Mevrian in mourning for her lost brother.
- Dorothy L. Sayers quotes the last two lines of the ballad in her mystery novel Clouds of Witness.
- There is a story, "The Three Ravens", in Jim Henson's HBO special The StoryTeller which, despite its title, is based on the German fairy tale The Six Swans, not this ballad.
- The ballad was selected for use in the 2017 period film My Cousin Rachel, following a commission for a dark English folk tune to be sung in the film at a Christmas feast for an early-1800s farmstead.
- A recording of the song features in the credits for the 2014 Channel 4 period drama New Worlds, which is set in England during the 1680s.
- A version of the song by John Harle features in Simon Schama's A History of Britain, particularly in the episodes "The Body of the Queen", "The British Wars" and "The Two Winstons".
- The song is sung by Henry VIII in the 2023 film Firebrand, which is about his marriage to Katherine Parr.
- The Australian depressive rock band Expurgatory used the words of "Twa Corbies" in their song "Twa" from their compilation album A lustrum in 2018.

== Translations ==
Both "The Three Ravens" and "Twa Corbies" have been translated to other languages, typically sung to the same melody as Twa Corbies or that of the Breton song "An Alarc'h" ("The Swan").

Known versions include:

- Danish: Ravnene (The Ravens), a translation of Twa Corbies by Danish folklorist Svend Grundtvig (1824–1883). The band Svartsot plays a version named "De to Ravne" (2022)
- Hebrew: שלושה בני עורב (Three sons of a raven), translated by Nathan Alterman, and a more popular translation שלושה עורבים (Three ravens) by Yaakov Shabtai.
- Finnish: Kaksi korppia, a translation of "Twa Corbies" by Finnish band Tarujen Saari.
- Frisian: De twa roeken, translated by Klaes Bruinsma, sung by Doede Veeman on his LP Frustraasjebloes.
- German: Die drei Raben, a translation of The Three Ravens, by Theodor Fontane (1819–1898). Die zwei Raben by the same author is the best known German version.
  - The German medieval/rock crossover group Schelmish wrote a German version of The Three Ravens lyrics, also titled Rabenballade (Raven's Ballad).
  - The German group Subway to Sally wrote the song Krähenfraß (Food for the Crows), also based on the Twa Corbies version and using a very similar melody, but with even more sinister lyrics. This version places the story in present day, replaces the knight with a soldier, and adds a new stanza in the end, loosely translating to "the bare bones will be clean / and preserved for a long time / and announce shining from the dirt / what a soldier's purpose is".
  - The German neo-medieval group Die Streuner has their own version titled Rabenballade. In the lyrics. not only do the dogs stop guarding their master, they eat his flesh the next day. The falcons (not mentioned to be his own) are simply "no longer seen" and the maid "already that evening doesn't sleep alone".
- The Czech folk music group Spirituál kvintet adapted the melody of "The Three Ravens" to record a song called Válka růží. However, the theme has been completely changed, as the new lyrics concerned the Wars of the Roses between the Yorks and Lancasters.
  - The Czech folk music group Asonance adopted "Twa Corbies" in a translation similar in tone to original.
  - The Czech folk metal group Hakka Muggies used the tune in their song Havrani (lit. Ravens). The lyrics, however, follow a story of two Scottish outlaw brothers, so the ravens are a metaphor.
  - The Czech group Ječmen used the tune and text by Asonance to make a comedic version about two chickens trying to survive after they've eaten all the barley and their master cannot make whisky.
- Norwegian: Ravnene (The Ravens), a translation very similar to the Danish version. The Norwegian folk rock group Folque performed this song on their debut album, and used a tune similar to Steeleye Span's version.
- Russian: The Russian poet Aleksandr Pushkin published in 1828 a partial translation of the French translation of Walter Scott's Border Poems. It includes the poem "Шотландская песня" (Scottish Song), which has become very well known among Russian-speaking people. Pushkin's translation contains only the first half of the poem, ending with "and the mistress awaits for her lover, not the killed one, but the alive one". Many composers of the time wrote musical interpretations of the poem.
  - The Russian folk band Sherwood recorded a Russian-language version of "Twa Corbies" on their album Sweet Joan (2010) using their own translation.
- Basque: Bi beleak is a translation of "Twa Corbies" from the Basque poet Jon Mirande, sung by the Basque singer Imanol Larzabal.
- The Polish folk band Odpust Zupełny recorded a Polish-language version called Ballada o dwóch krukach (Ballad of two ravens).

== Media ==
- Rabenanwälte und Abmahnkrähen (German) – a parody of “The Three Ravens”.

== See also ==
- List of the Child Ballads
