= Arthur Argo =

- Born: 1935
- Died: 1981 (aged 45–46)
- Known for: Traditional folk musician and collector

Arthur Argo (1935–1981) was a Scottish traditional folk musician, promoter and collector and the great grandson of Gavin Greig.

Argo came from a family with a rich traditional song heritage. Argo worked alongside Hamish Henderson collecting field recordings from the North East of Scotland and beyond. Argo, was a promoter of the work of Scottish folk artists and their music. After working as a journalist in the North East, from 1966 he worked for BBC Scotland, from 1973 as a producer with Radio Scotland. He produced the long-running radio series 'Fit Like Folk?', and 'The Reel Blend', a Scottish music series. He was the founder and president of the Aberdeen Folksong Club and published a series of folk song booklets in the 1960s called 'Chapbook'. Many musicians such as Aly Bain, Barbara Dickson, Jean Redpath and Billy Connolly cite Argo as a major influence and stepping stone in their early careers. Argo visited the United States twice in the early 1960s and met many of the established and rising stars of the American folk scene including Pete Seeger and Bob Dylan.
