= Alastair McDonald (musician) =

Scottish musician (born 1941)

Alastair McDonald (born 28 October 1941) is a Scottish banjo-playing folk and jazz musician.

McDonald has mainly recorded songs written by other songwriters, such as Robert Burns and Jim MacLean, but has also written songs himself (Culloden's Harvest, The Village Green at Gretna, Sam The Skull), and reworked traditional songs (The Bell Rock Light, Mingulay Boat Song). He has toured the United States (every state except Hawaii and Alaska), Canada, Israel, Denmark, and Thailand. Much of his work in recent years has been political songs, usually socialist and/or republican, such as his tribute song to John MacLean and The Wee German Lairdie. He supports Scottish independence. He is also seen regularly performing the honky tonk.

McDonald lives in Netherlee, East Renfrewshire.

== Selected Discography ==
- Scotland First (1970) Nevis (NEV LP108)
- Scottish Battle Ballads (1973)
- Bonnie Prince Charlie with Leo Maguire (1973)
- Scotland in Song Alastair McDonald and Leo Maguire (1993)
- Songs of Scotland (2012)
