= John Maclean (Scottish socialist) =

Scottish schoolteacher and revolutionary socialist (1879–1923)

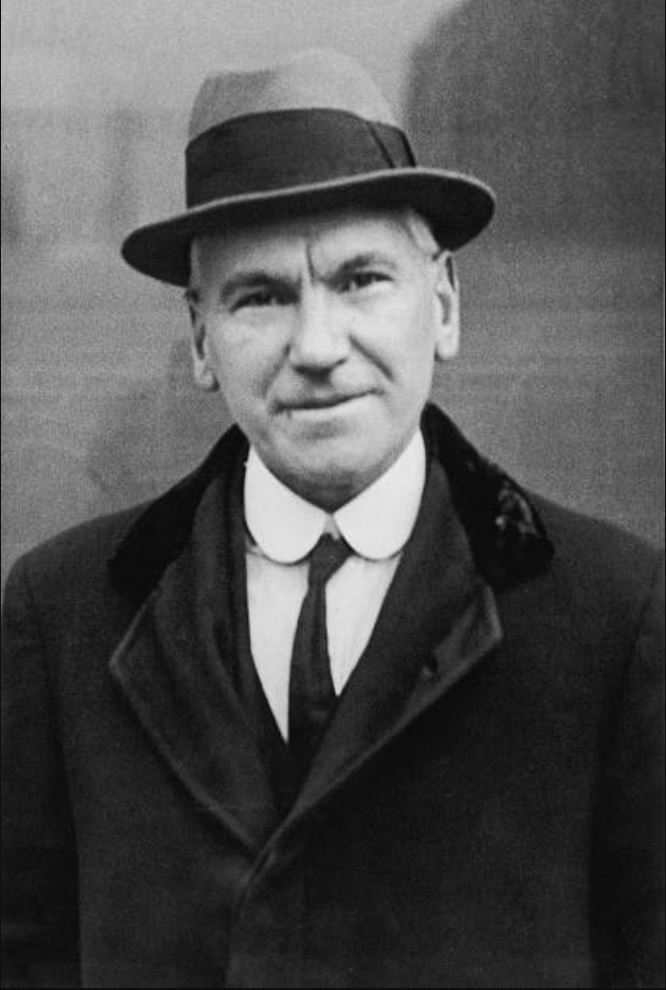
- John Maclean in December of 1918 upon his release from prison

Bolshevik consul in Scotland
- In office February 1918 – Unknown

Vice-President (Honorary) of the Third All-Russian Congress of Soviets
- In office 23 January 1918 – 31 January 1918

Personal details
- Born: 24 August 1879 Pollokshaws, Scotland
- Died: 30 November 1923 (aged 44) Pollokshaws, Glasgow, Scotland
- Resting place: Eastwood New Cemetery
- Citizenship: British
- Party: Scottish Workers Republican Party
- Other political affiliations: Communist Labour Party; Socialist Labour Party; SDF (later BSP); Co-op movement
- Spouse: Agnes Maclean
- Education: University of Glasgow
- Profession: Schoolteacher, Politician

John Maclean (24 August 1879 – 30 November 1923) was a Scottish schoolteacher and revolutionary socialist of the Red Clydeside era. He was notable for his outspoken opposition to World War I, which caused his arrest under the Defence of the Realm Act and loss of his teaching post, after which he became a full-time Marxist lecturer and organiser. In April 1918 he was arrested for sedition, and his 75-minute speech from the dock became a celebrated text for Scottish left-wingers. He was sentenced to five years' penal servitude, but was released after the November armistice.

Maclean believed that Scottish workers were especially fitted to lead the revolution, and talked of "Celtic communism", inspired by clan spirit. But his launch of a Scottish Workers Republican Party and a Scottish Communist Party were largely unsuccessful. Although he had been appointed Bolshevik representative in Scotland, he was not in harmony with the Communist Party of Great Britain, even though it had absorbed the British Socialist Party, to which he had belonged. In captivity, Maclean had been on hunger strike, and prolonged force-feeding had permanently affected his health. He collapsed during a speech and died of pneumonia, aged forty-four.

== Biography ==
=== Early life ===
Maclean was born in Pollokshaws, then on the outskirts of Glasgow, Scotland. His father Daniel (Scottish Gaelic: Dòmhnall MacIllEathain; 1843–1888) was a potter who hailed from the Isle of Mull and his mother Ann (1846–1914) came from Corpach. His parents spoke Gaelic and he was raised in a Calvinist household, Maclean trained as a schoolteacher under the auspices of the Free Church and then attended part-time classes at the University of Glasgow, graduating with a Master of Arts degree in 1904. (Maclean often used the letters M.A. after his name when being published).

=== Political development ===
Maclean first came to politics through the Pollokshaws Progressive Union and Robert Blatchford's Merrie England. He became convinced that the living standards of the working-classes could only be improved by social revolution and it was as a Marxist that he joined the Social Democratic Federation (SDF), and remained in the organisation as it formed the British Socialist Party.

In 1906, Maclean gave a series of speeches in Pollokshaws which led to the formation of an SDF branch there, and through these, he met James D. MacDougall, who became his strongest supporter for the remainder of his life.

Maclean was also an active member of the Co-operative movement and it was his prominent role that led the Renfrewshire Co-operative Societies to pressure local school boards to provide facilities for adult classes in economics.

As a revolutionary enemy of what he saw as an imperialist war, Maclean was fiercely opposed to the stance adopted by the leadership of the BSP around H. M. Hyndman. However he was not to be a part of the new leadership which replaced Hyndman in 1916.

=== Marxist educator ===
By the time of World War I, his socialism was of a revolutionary nature, although he worked with others on the Clyde Workers' Committee who were more reformist in outlook, such as his friend James Maxton. He heavily opposed the war, as he felt it was a war of imperialism which divided workers from one another, as he explained in his letter to Forward (transcript).

His politics made him well known to the authorities of the day, and on 27 October 1915 he was arrested under the Defence of the Realm Act and Govan School Board sacked him from his teaching post at Lorne Street Primary School. As a consequence, he became a full-time Marxist lecturer and organiser, educating workers in Marxist theory. He would later found the Scottish Labour College.

During World War I, he was active in anti-war circles and was imprisoned in 1916 for breaching the Defence of the Realm Act, but was released in 1917 after demonstrations following the February Revolution in Russia.

=== Relationship with Russia ===
In January 1918 Maclean was elected to the chair of the Third All-Russian Congress of Soviets and a month later appointed Bolshevik consul in Scotland. He established a Consulate at 12 South Portland Street in Glasgow but was refused recognition by the British Government.

=== Trial and imprisonment for sedition (1918) ===
On 15 April 1918, Maclean was arrested for sedition. He was refused bail and his trial fixed for 9 May in Edinburgh. He conducted his own defence in a defiant manner, refusing to plead and when asked if he objected to any of the jurors replying, "I object to the whole lot of them." The prosecution case was based on the testimony of witnesses who had attended his meetings, who quoted extracts from his speeches using notes they had written up from memory after the meeting. Maclean objected to his words being taken out of context, saying. "The main parts of my speech, in which my themes are developed are omitted. I want to expose the trickery of the British government and their police and their lawyers."

This speech from the dock has passed into folklore for the Scottish left. Lasting for some 75 minutes, Maclean's speech began:

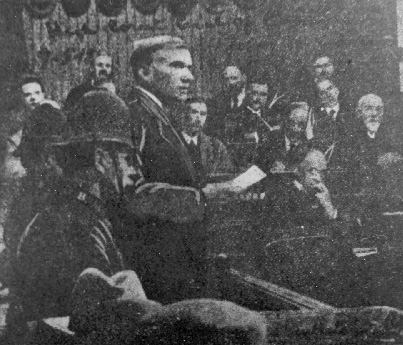
Maclean delivering his famous 'Speech from the Dock'.

It has been said that they cannot fathom my motive. For the full period of my active life I have been a teacher of economics to the working classes, and my contention has always been that capitalism is rotten to its foundations, and must give place to a new society. I had a lecture, the principal heading of which was "Thou shalt not steal; thou shalt not kill", and I pointed out that as a consequence of the robbery that goes on in all civilised countries today, our respective countries have had to keep armies, and that inevitably our armies must clash together. On that and on other grounds, I consider capitalism the most infamous, bloody and evil system that mankind has ever witnessed. My language is regarded as extravagant language, but the events of the past four years have proved my contention.

He went on to say:

I wish no harm to any human being, but I, as one man, am going to exercise my freedom of speech. No human being on the face of the earth, no government is going to take from me my right to speak, my right to protest against wrong, my right to do everything that is for the benefit of mankind. I am not here, then, as the accused; I am here as the accuser of capitalism dripping with blood from head to foot.

His speech concluded:

I have taken up unconstitutional action at this time because of the abnormal circumstances and because precedent has been given by the British government. I am a socialist, and have been fighting and will fight for an absolute reconstruction of society for the benefit of all. I am proud of my conduct. I have squared my conduct with my intellect, and if everyone had done so this war would not have taken place. I act square and clean for my principles. .... No matter what your accusations against me may be, no matter what reservations you keep at the back of your head, my appeal is to the working class. I appeal exclusively to them because they and they only can bring about the time when the whole world will be in one brotherhood, on a sound economic foundation. That, and that alone, can be the means of bringing about a re-organisation of society. That can only be obtained when the people of the world get the world, and retain the world.

He was sentenced to five years' penal servitude, and imprisoned in Peterhead prison near Aberdeen. However, a militant campaign was launched for his release:

The call 'Release John Maclean' was never silent. Every week the socialist papers kept up the barrage and reminded their readers that in Germany Karl Liebknecht was already free, while in 'democratic' Britain John Maclean was lying in a prison cell being forcibly fed twice a day by an India rubber tube forced down his gullet or up his nose. 'Is the Scottish Office' asked Forward 'to be stained with a crime in some respects even more horrible and revolting, more callous and cruel, than that which the Governors of Ireland perpetrated on the shattered body of James Connolly?'

Following the armistice on 11 November, he was released on 3 December 1918, returning to Glasgow to a tumultuous welcome.

Eleven days later, Maclean was the official Labour Party candidate at the general election for the constituency of Glasgow Gorbals, where he failed to unseat the sitting MP, George Barnes, a former Labour MP who had defected to support Lloyd George's coalition government.

=== Ireland ===
Maclean was a supporter of Home Rule for Ireland but originally opposed an independent Ireland because he was afraid that an independent Catholic Ireland would be disastrous. He later became committed to Irish independence as part of a worldwide anti-imperialist struggle. He wrote a pamphlet called 'The Irish Tragedy: Scotland's Disgrace' which sold 20,000 copies. Following the Easter Rising he had contacts with members of the Scottish Divisional Board of the Irish Republican Brotherhood In the summer of 1907 he went on a speaking tour of Ireland, here he made friends with Jim Larkin. When the Easter Rising happened he distanced himself from it because he viewed it to be a bourgeois-democratic revolution and in contradiction with his pacifist principles.

In July 1919 he visited Dublin for the first time and gave speeches. By the end of his life his attitude to Ireland had been radicalised and he gave up his opposition to physical force Irish republicanism. He described the Irish War of Independence as "The Irish fight for freedom", defended killings of "scabs and traitors to their race", and condoned the assassination of a magistrate, Alan Bell, saying "What self-respecting man or woman can blame the Irish for ridding the earth of such a foul skunk?". He saw the war in Ireland as strengthening the Bolshevik revolution in Russia, arguing that "Irish Sinn Féiners, who make no profession of socialism or communism, ... are doing more to help Russia and the revolution than all we professed Marxian Bolsheviks in Britain". He saw Irish independence as being a positive thing for Scotland; in a speech Maclean gave at Motherwell in 1920, he claimed that the British government's foreign policy towards Ireland was intended to "starve [Irish] youths out of their native land" and Ireland's independence would decrease Irish emigration to Scotland, thus allowing for more opportunities for Scottish workers. When the Government of the Irish Free State started executing its opponents during the Irish Civil War Maclean wrote a letter of protest to W. T. Cosgrave expressing his "dismay".

=== Formation of the Communist Party ===
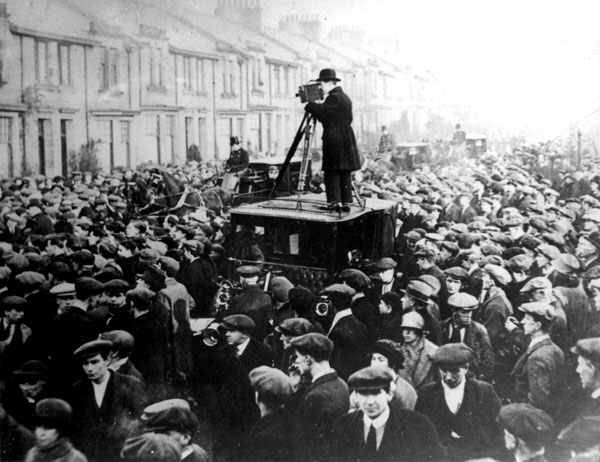
John Maclean's casket being removed from his Pollokshaws home on Auldhouse Road.

As the BSP was the main constituent organisation which merged into the newly formed Communist Party of Great Britain, Maclean was alienated from the new party despite his support for the Communist International. While declaring that he wanted to make Glasgow a Petrograd, he was adamant that Moscow should not dictate to Glasgow and declare himself in favour of a Scottish Workers' Republic, arguing that Lenin's acceptance of a 'British' Communist Party was a mistake based on inadequate information. He believed that workers in Scotland could develop in a revolutionary direction more swiftly than their comrades in England and Wales, and in 1920 he attempted to found a Scottish Communist Party. This group renamed itself the Communist Labour Party and dropped Maclean's distinctive positions, so he left in disgust. He attempted to found a new Scottish Communist Party, without success. It seems that he may have become a member of the Socialist Labour Party at this time.

In November 1922, he wrote in The Vanguard that "the British empire is the greatest menace to the human race... The best interest of humanity can therefore be served by the break-up of the British empire. The Irish, the Indians and others are playing their part. Why ought not the Scottish? The corruption of the English communists and the position of the English governing class, then, amply justify the establishment of a Scottish Communist Republic." In 1923, Maclean founded the Scottish Workers Republican Party, which combined communist ideologies with Scottish nationalism. Maclean's call for a Communist Republic of Scotland was based on the belief that traditional Scottish Gaelic society was structured along the lines of "community". He argued that "the communism of the clans must be re-established on a modern basis" and raised the slogan "back to community and forward to communism".

=== Support for the Unemployed ===
Maclean was a member of the Glasgow Unemployed Provisional Committee. In November 1920, he led a delegation to Glasgow Parish Council to make a proposal that the Barnhill Poorhouse be used to accommodate homeless unemployed people and their families. The Council deferred the proposal and the Poorhouse was closed in 1935.

In the following year Maclean, accompanied by Helen Crawfurd and Patrick Dollan, spoke at a demonstration in the City Hall arranged by the Committee. The Scotsman newspaper reported that "resolutions were passed"

=== Death, legacy, reputation and in popular culture ===
==== Death ====
His stay in Peterhead Prison in 1918 caused a considerable deterioration in his health, being force fed through hunger strikes. Milton quotes a letter that Agnes, his wife, wrote to Edwin C. Fairchild (a leading member of the British Socialist Party):

Well, John has been on hunger strike since July. He resisted the forcible feeding for a good while, but submitted to the inevitable. Now he is being fed by a stomach tube twice daily. He has aged very much and has the look of a man who is going through torture... Seemingly anything is law in regard to John. I hope you will make the atrocity public. We must get him out of their clutches. It is nothing but slow murder...

Maclean died at home in Pollokshaws, Glasgow on 30 November 1923, aged 44. His reputation was such that many thousands of people lined the streets of Glasgow to see his funeral procession pass. In the intervening time Maclean's funeral has become known as the largest Glasgow ever saw. He left a legacy that has subsequently been claimed by both the Scottish Nationalist and Labour movements, making him rare in this respect amongst Scotland's historical figures. The modern Scottish Socialist Party lay claim to Maclean's political legacy, particularly the Scottish Republican Socialist Movement previously a faction (or "platform") within the SSP.

According to a BBC television documentary aired in January 2015, Maclean collapsed while giving an outdoor speech and died of pneumonia. Several days before he had given his only overcoat to a destitute man from Barbados, Neill Johnstone.

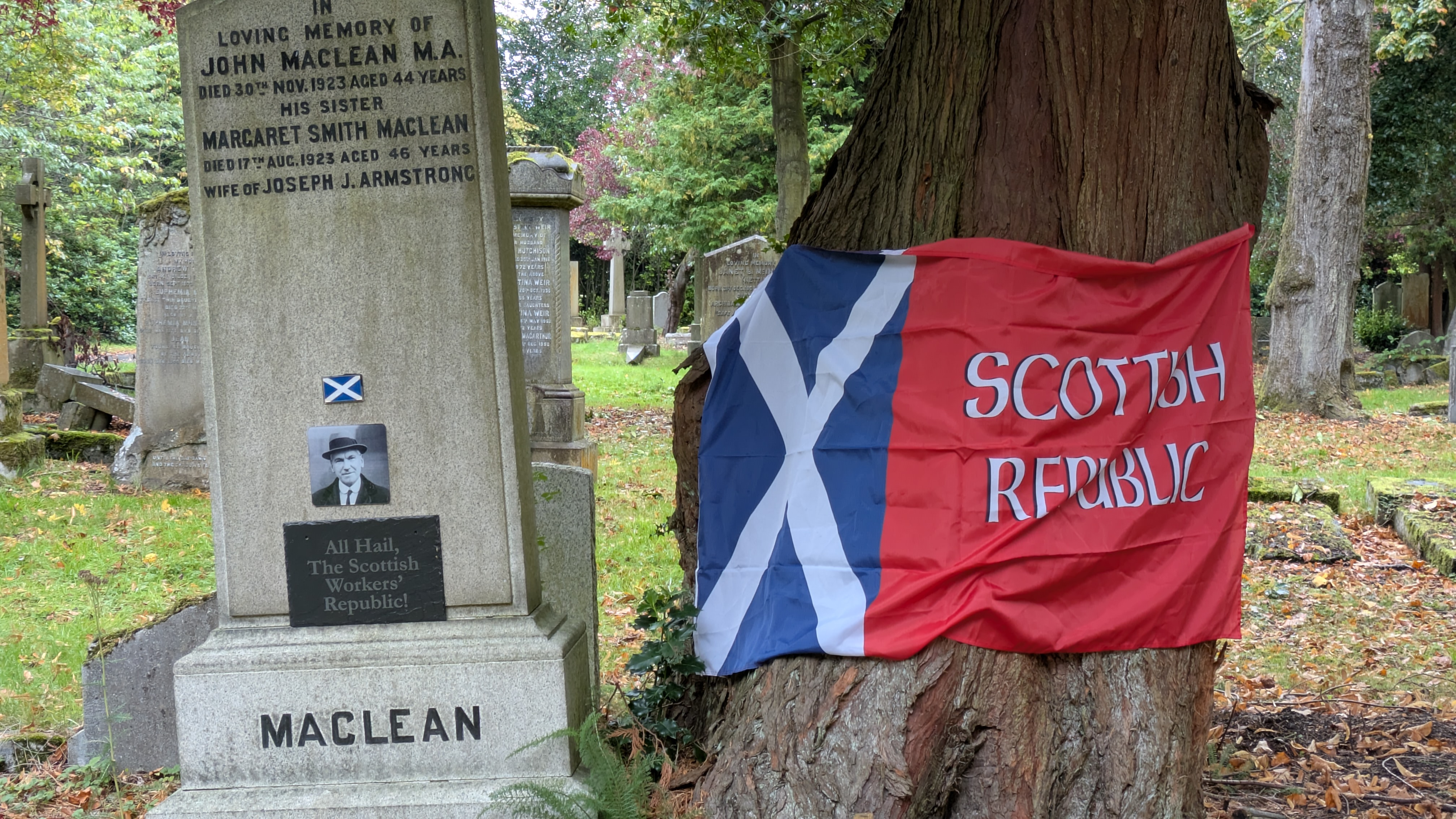
Grave of John Maclean in September 2025.

==== Reputation ====
Vladimir Lenin described him as one of the "best-known names of the isolated heroes who have taken upon themselves the arduous role of forerunners of the world revolution." He has been described by his daughter Nan Milton and by the publication CounterFire as the "Scottish Lenin". The magazine Socialist Appeal has labeled him a "Marxist who played an outstanding role in promoting the ideas and cause of Marxism...[and] worked like a Trojan to promote the principles of Marxism amongst the working class of Scotland" The National describes him as "a man who most knowledgeable Scots would consider a legend, indeed an almost mythical Celtic giant of socialism". David Sherry, author of the book 'John Maclean: Red Clydesider' considers him an "outstanding revolutionary leader".

==== Popular culture ====
In his poem "John Maclean (1879–1923)", written in 1934 but only published later in the 1956 edition of Stony Limits and Other Poems, Hugh MacDiarmid railed that "of all Maclean's foes not one was his peer" and described Maclean as "both beautiful and red" in his 1943 poem "Krassivy, Krassivy" This was the inspiration for the title of Krassivy, a 1979 play by Glasgow writer Freddie Anderson. Maclean was eulogised as "the eagle o' the age" and placed in the Scottish pantheon alongside Thomas Muir and William Wallace by Sydney Goodsir Smith in his "Ballant O John Maclean". In 1948, MacDiarmid and Smith (among others) gave readings at a "huge mass meeting" at St. Andrew's Hall in Glasgow, organised by the Scottish-USSR Society to mark the 25th Anniversary of his death. The Scottish Esperanto poet and novelist John Islay Francis (1924–2012) in his novel La Granda Kaldrono ("The Big Cauldron") published in 1978, describes different attitudes toward the first and the second world wars. Among the characters, John Maclean is the only actual one, and has an important role.

Maclean is the subject of a number of songs. Hamish Henderson makes reference to Maclean in the final verse of his "Freedom Come-All-Ye" and his "John Maclean March" was specifically written for the 25th anniversary memorial meeting. John Maclean was known as "The Fighting Dominie" and this forms the chorus of Matt McGinn's song "The Ballad of John Maclean". He is referenced in several of the tracks on the album Red Clydeside by folk musicians Alistair Hulett and Dave Swarbrick, and also in the song "Rent Strike" by Thee Faction.

The bosses and the judges united as one man,
For Johnny was a menace to their '14 — '18 plan,
They wanted men for slaughter in the fields of Armentières,
John called upon the people to smash the profiteers

They brought him to the courtroom in Edinburgh town,
But still he did not cower, he firmly held his ground,
And stoutly he defended, his every word and deed,
Five years it was his sentence in the jail at Peterhead

— Matt McGinn, Ballad of John Maclean, 1965.

Maclean's life is celebrated in the play The Wrong Side of the Law by Ayrshire writer Norman Deeley, dealing with the political and personal struggles that Maclean faced in his fight to establish socialism in Scotland.

The Soviet Union (USSR) honoured Maclean with an avenue in central Leningrad – Maklin Prospekt, which ran north from the Fontanka towards the Moika. It has now, like Leningrad/St Petersburg itself, reverted to its original name, Angliisky Prospekt (English Avenue).

To mark the 50th anniversary of MacLean's death in 1973 a 6 ft high cairn of Scottish granite was unveiled at Pollokshaws, not far from Maclean's birthplace. Nan and her sister Jean attended the unveiling ceremony. The cairn was inscribed: "In memory of John Maclean, born in Pollokshaws on 24th August 1879, died 30th November 1923. Famous pioneer of working-class education. He forged the Scottish link in the golden chain of world socialism". At the ceremony, Hugh MacDiarmid described Maclean as "Next to Burns, the greatest-ever Scot".

In 1979, on the centenary of his birth, the USSR issued a 4 kopeck commemorative postage stamp depicting Maclean in a portrait by Peter Emilevich Bendel.

==== Nan Milton ====
Maclean's daughter was Nan Milton, who helped found the John MacLean Society and served as its secretary. She copied all of her father's writings from his own and other publications in the National Library and typed them up, these were read by Hugh MacDiarmid who then championed his ideas. Milton wrote a biography of Maclean, which was published in December 1973.

== See also ==
- James Connolly
- Scottish Workers' Republican Party
- Red Clydeside
- Guy Aldred

== Bibliography ==
- Anderson, Tom, John Maclean MA, Proletarian Press, Glasgow, 1930
- Aldred, Guy A., John Maclean: Martyr of the Class Struggle, Bakunin Press, Glasgow, 1932.
- Bell, Henry, John Maclean, Hero of Red Clydeside, Pluto Press, 2018.
- Bell, Tom, John Maclean, Fighter for Freedom, Communist Party Scottish Committee, 1944.
- Broom, John, John Maclean, Loanhead, 1973
- Clunie, James, The Voice of Labour, Autobiography of a House Painter, Dunfermline, 1958
- Knox, William, Scottish Labour Leaders 1918–1939: A Biographical Dictionary (Ed. Dr. William Knox), Edinburgh, 1984, p. 179. ISBN 0-906391-40-7
- Maclean, John, In the Rapids of Revolution: Essays, Articles, and Letters, 1902–23 Ed. Milton, Nan, Allison and Busby, London, 1978. ISBN 0-85031-175-6
- McGuigan, Kenny. John Maclean: A Working Class Hero. Wellred Books, London, 2005.
- McShane, Harry and Smith, Joan, No Mean Fighter, London, 1978. ISBN 0-904383-24-5
- McShane, Harry, "Remembering John Maclean: Portrait of a Scottish Revolutionary", New Edinburgh Review 19, 1972, p4-10
- Milton, Nan, John Maclean, Pluto Press Ltd., 1973. ISBN 0-902818-38-4.
- Raszkowski, Josef, Battlepost of the Poor: The Legend of John Maclean, in Cencrastus No. 1, Autumn 1979, pp. 9 – 12 ISSN 0264-0856.
- Ripley, Brian J.; John McHugh. John Maclean. Lives of the Left Series. Manchester Univ Press. 1 December 1989. ISBN 0-7190-2181-2
- Robertson, Donald; Great John Maclean Has Come Home to the Clyde: The Life and Times of Scotland's Greatest Socialist. Resistance Books, London, 2025. ISBN 978-1-872242-39-2
- Ross, Raymond J., Hugh MacDiarmid and John MacLean, in Hearn, Sheila G. (ed.), Cencrastus No. 11, New Year 1983, pp. 33–36, ISSN 0264-0856
- Sherry, Dave. John Maclean. Bookmarks, London, 1998
- Thatcher, Ian D., "John Maclean: Soviet Versions", in History, Vol. 77, Issue 251, pp. 421–429, October 1992
- Young, James D. John Maclean: Clydeside Socialist, Clydeside Press, Glasgow, 1992. ISBN 1-873586-10-8
