= Communist Labour Party (Scotland) =

- Chairman: Jack Leckie
- National Secretary: John Maclean
- Treasurer: Alec Geddes
- Founded: 1920
- Dissolved: 1921
- Split from: Communist Party (British Section of the Third International)
- Succeeded by: Communist Party of Great Britain
- Ideology: Communism
- Political position: Far-left

The Communist Labour Party was a communist party in Scotland. It was formed in September 1920 by the Scottish Workers' Committee and the Scottish section of the Communist Party (British Section of the Third International) (CP (BSTI)), some members of the Socialist Labour Party (SLP) and various local communist groups. In the same month, the Communist Party of South Wales and the West of England was founded, with a very similar programme.

Under the influence of John Maclean MA, the group was provisionally named the Scottish Communist Party. However, its founding conference, which Maclean did not attend, renamed it the Communist Labour Party. It also decided that it should remain a provisional body with the aim of joining the Communist Party of Great Britain (CPGB), a position championed by Willie Gallacher. His positions defeated, Maclean left the group and instead joined the SLP. The Communist Labour Party then joined the CPGB, along with the remainder of the CP (BSTI) in January 1921.
