= Wheeldon =

Wheeldon is a surname. Notable people with the surname include:

- Alice Wheeldon (1866–1919), British political activist
- Christopher Wheeldon (born 1973), British choreographer
- Dan Wheeldon (born 1989), English cricketer
- David Wheeldon (born 1989), English cricketer
- Gavin Wheeldon (born 1976), British businessman
- Hettie Wheeldon (1891–1920), British socialist, school teacher and antiwar campaigner
- Jay Wheeldon (born 1988), English footballer
- John Wheeldon (1929–2006), Australian politician
- Philip Wheeldon (1913–1992), English Anglican bishop
- Scott Wheeldon (born 1986), British rugby player
- Simon Wheeldon (born 1966), Canadian ice hockey player
- Tommy Wheeldon Jr. (born 1979), English football coach
- William Wheeldon (1898–1960), British co-operator, municipal politician and M.P.

== See also ==
- High Wheeldon, a hill in the Peak District, England
