= Esme Church =

British actress and theatre director (1893–1972)

- Born: 11 February 1893; England
- Died: 31 May 1972 (aged 79); Quenington, Gloucestershire, England, United Kingdom
- Education: Guildhall School of Music and Drama, RADA
- Occupation(s): Actress, theatre director, drama teacher

Esme Church (11 February 1893 – 31 May 1972) was a British actress and theatre director. In a long career she acted with the Old Vic Company, the Royal Shakespeare Company and on Broadway. She directed plays for the Old Vic, became head of the Old Vic Theatre School and then director of the Bradford Civic Playhouse, with its associated Northern Theatre School.

== Early life and education ==
Esmé Church was born on 11 February 1893 in Marylebone, London to Annie and Henry George Church. Her father was a solicitor. Church trained as an actress at the Guildhall School of Music and Drama and RADA.

== Stage career ==
In 1916, at the invitation of Lena Ashwell, Church joined a concert party entertaining troops in France and, at the end of World War I, Germany.

Among Church's earliest London appearances was a series of poetry recitals at the Æolian Hall in 1920. In the following year she was in The Child in Flanders by Cicely Hampton at the Lyric, Hammersmith, the first of several London seasons with the Lena Ashwell Players. In 1926 she took, with "high distinction", the title role of a bored housewife in Jane Clegg by St. John Ervine at the Century Theatre.

In 1927 she joined Lilian Baylis' Old Vic company; for her first season she played in Ibsen, Shakespeare (as Viola in Twelfth Night, Lady Macbeth opposite John Laurie, Mistress Page in The Merry Wives of Windsor and Gertrude in Hamlet) and Sheridan's Mrs Malaprop.

In 1931 she joined the Greyhound Theatre, Croydon, as artistic director, a position she held for two years before returning to the West End in a company headed by Tyrone Guthrie, with a long run in Dorothy Massingham's The Lake. Later in 1933 she again performed Gertrude, in William Bridges-Adams's production of Hamlet at the Shakespeare Memorial Theatre, opposite Anew McMaster.

Regular London acting engagements, including some film work, continued until October 1936 when, at Baylis's invitation, she returned to the Old Vic to direct Michael Redgrave and Edith Evans in a celebrated production of As You Like It. This was followed by Ghosts, an Old Vic production staged at the Vaudeville Theatre, which was presented for television later that year.

== Teaching ==
At same time as directing, both at the Old Vic and in West End theatres, Church organised new ventures: the Old Vic Theatre School and "Young Vic", a touring company aimed at young audiences and forerunner of today's theatre of the same name. In 1944 Church took the position of artistic director at the Bradford Civic Playhouse, a career development which initially caused puzzlement, but the move gave her the opportunity to found her own school, the Northern Theatre School at 26 Chapel Street, using the theatre facilities. The school's reputation grew rapidly and many notable actors trained there.

Her students included Tom Bell, William Gaunt, Dorothy Heathcote, Bernard Hepton, Donald Howarth, Bryan Mosley, Edward Petherbridge, Robert Stephens, Billie Whitelaw and Robert Fyfe.

Church still found time for other work, returning to London to act and direct. In 1955, once again directed by Guthrie, she appeared as Flora Van Husen in a production of The Matchmaker, transferring from the Theatre Royal Haymarket to the Royale, New York. Her last appearance was in 1962 as Madame de Rosemond in The RSC's The Art of Seduction, a version from John Barton of Les Liaisons dangereuses, at the Aldwych Theatre.

== Personal life, death and legacy ==
She retired firstly to Kent and then to Quenington, Gloucestershire, where she died aged 79, on 31 May 1972.

On 5 June 2025, Historic England unveiled a national Blue plaque commemorating Church, at 26 Chapel St, Bradford, where she ran The Northern Theatre School.
