= Massingham =

Massingham may refer to:

- Great Massingham, a village in Norfolk, England
  - RAF Great Massingham
- Little Massingham, a village in Norfolk, England
- Massingham railway station, a former station which served Great Massingham and Little Massingham

== People with the surname ==
- Gertrude Massingham (1887–1963), British suffragette and animal welfare advocate, wife of H. J. Massingham
- H. J. Massingham (1888–1952), British writer
- Henry William Massingham (1860–1924), British journalist, father of H. J. Massingham
- Richard Massingham (1898–1953), British actor
- Harold Massingham (1932-2011), British poet and crossword setter.

== Entertainment ==
- The Massingham Affair a 1962 novel by Edward Grierson
- The Massingham Affair (TV series), a 1964 BBC Television adaptation

== See also ==
- Messingham (disambiguation)
- Missingham, a surname
