= Leonard Cotton =

British socialist activist and journalist

Leonard Cotton (9 October 1875 – 20 June 1958) was a British socialist activist and journalist.

A gardener based in Oxford, Cotton first came to prominence in the Social Democratic Federation (SDF), serving on its executive in 1898, 1901 and 1902. He was imprisoned for a month for breaking by-laws on speaking in Manchester. A leading supporter of James Connolly, in 1901 he was attacked by undergraduates when Connolly came to speak in Oxford and as a result was sacked from his job.

Already known as an "impossibilist" critic of the SDF leadership, Cotton was one of the founders of Connolly's new newspaper, The Socialist, along with some London-based party members. In May 1903, the paper announced that it was founding a new party, the Socialist Labour Party. Although Cotton did not immediately resign from the SDF, he was expelled at its conference later in the year.

A prominent figure in the SLP, Cotton served as its secretary from 1910 until 1919. However, he and Frank Budgen resigned in 1921, concerned that the SLP was dropping its support for De Leonism, and formed the Socialist Propaganda League. This new party became the British affiliate of the Socialist Labor Party of America. In 1925, it was renamed the Socialist Labour League, and in 1929, it merged back into the SLP, with Cotton becoming secretary once more, and remaining its leading figure for many years. In 1945, he faced a challenge from two Scottish branches, which split to form a group named the "Majority SLP", but Cotton remained in post until he was expelled a couple of years before his death in 1958.

Party political offices
Preceded by Frank Budgen	Secretary of the Socialist Labour Party; 1910 – 1918	Succeeded by Tom Bell
Preceded by Tom Mitchell?	Secretary of the Socialist Labour Party; 1929 – c.1956	Succeeded by T. A. Kelly
