= IWGB =

IWGB may refer to:

- Independent Workers' Union of Great Britain
- Industrial Workers of Great Britain
