= Messingham (disambiguation) =

Messingham is a village in Lincolnshire, England.

Messingham may also refer to:

- Richard Massingham (1898–1953), British actor
- Robert Messingham (born 1396), English politician
- Thomas Messingham (17th century), Irish hagiologist

== See also ==
- Massingham (disambiguation)
- Missingham, a surname
