= Seán McLoughlin (communist) =

Irish nationalist and communist activist

- Born: 2 June 1895; Dublin, Ireland
- Died: 13 February 1960 (aged 64)
- Military career
- Branch: Irish Volunteers; Irish Republican Army (1922–1969)
- Rank: Commandant-General
- Unit: Fianna Éireann
- Conflicts: Easter Rising; Irish Civil War

Seán McLoughlin (2 June 1895 – 13 February 1960) was an Irish nationalist and communist activist. When only twenty, he was made a commandant-general during the Easter Rising. He was then prominent in Irish and British socialist parties before fighting with the Irish Republican Army during the Irish Civil War. He was also a leader in Na Fianna Éireann. In 1924, he moved to England, where he was briefly imprisoned during the UK General Strike before moving away from political activity.

== Early life ==
Born as John McLoughlin in north Dublin, McLoughlin was the second child of Patrick McLoughlin, a labourer, and Christina Shea. He lived in the family home on North King Street until he was 20. He became interested in Irish nationalism, and joined both the Gaelic League and Fianna Éireann in 1910, and the Irish Republican Brotherhood soon after. Around this time, his father became an activist in the Irish Transport and General Workers' Union, playing a part in the Dublin lock-out of 1913, which was an important influence on Seán.

== Easter Rising ==
Late in 1913, McLoughlin joined the Irish Volunteers, siding with its anti-World War I faction, and serving in G company under Seán Heuston. Early in 1916, Heuston and McLoughlin both transferred to D company, and took part in the Easter Rising, occupying the Mendicity Institution. Over the next two days, McLoughlin repeatedly travelled between the Institution and General Post Office (GPO), updating the leadership on progress and obtaining supplies. However, on one trip, he was identified by civilians and nearly captured, instead finding refuge in the Four Courts and then finally returning to the GPO. Once there, James Connolly gave him command of thirty volunteers and a mission to occupy the offices of the Irish Independent, to maintain a watch on British troop movements and potentially bombard them, if they began an assault.

The following day, McLoughlin returned to the GPO to check in. His sister, Mary McLoughlin, age 15, was stationed there as well, acting as a courier. He attempted to warn the O'Rahilly against moving out to Parnell Street, as he knew the area was occupied by British troops, but was too late to catch him. The O'Rahilly was killed, and McLoughlin assumed control in the GPO, with the agreement of the injured Connolly. He successfully evacuated 300 men to Moore Street, and this led Connolly and the other headquarters staff to award him the title of commandant-general and overall charge of the Volunteers' military operations, even though he was still only 21 years old.

McLoughlin organised tunnelling through the walls of buildings in Moore Street, allowing the troops to distribute through a larger space and bringing them closer to the British barricades, without the British troops realising. He planned a break-out, hoping to surprise the British and win against them in hand-to-hand combat, but the commander-in-chief, Patrick Pearse decided that the risk of civilian casualties was too high, and instead surrendered. McLoughlin opposed this decision, but nonetheless arranged for the remaining troops to march to the agreed place of surrender in an orderly fashion.

Following the surrender, McLoughlin expected to be sentenced to death, but a British captain removed his insignia, and the British regarded him as a minor figure, and he was simply interned, at Knutsford Gaol and then Frongoch internment camp. He was released in December, and returned to the Volunteers, organising the movement in Tipperary.

== Communism ==
McLoughlin also joined the Socialist Party of Ireland (SPI), a broad labourist group with some sympathy for syndicalism. Within the group, he was a leading supporter of the Bolsheviks in the October Revolution, and formed a communist faction with Roddy Connolly and other supporters, aiming to build links with the Socialist Labour Party (SLP) in Britain. This faction proved popular within the party, and McLoughlin was elected as president of the SPI in September 1919.

In December 1919, McLoughlin resigned his positions in the SPI to travel to Scotland. There, he undertook a speaking tour on behalf of the newly formed "Irish Labour Party (Glasgow)", a group unconnected with the Irish Labour Party based in Ireland. He attracted many new supporters to the party, but fell out with its leadership after they supported John McLaren Biggar, the Labour Party candidate, in the 1920 Paisley by-election. McLoughlin's opposition to Biggar won over the majority of the party's membership, and he was elected as its president in February 1920, but attracted the enmity of party leader William Drew, and instead decided to take his supporters into a new group, the Irish Workers' Republic Party. This soon disappeared, but he began to speak for the SLP, also writing extensively for its newspaper, The Socialist.

McLoughlin returned to Ireland in May 1920, recuperating from breathing problems. In his absence, the SPI had ceased to function, and he founded a new Irish Communist Labour Party, becoming its chairman. He hoped that the new party could affiliate to the Comintern. After a short return to Scotland to complete some planned public speeches, he spent several more months in Dublin, trying to build the Communist Labour Party, while still active in the Volunteers. In November, he began another speaking tour of Britain, starting in Sheffield, where he contacted local Irish emigrants and helped arrange the smuggling of arms to the Volunteers. He then toured around Scotland, speaking again on behalf of the SLP. He remained loyal to the SLP, joining the party even though many of its leading members formed the Communist Unity Group and then joined the Communist Party of Great Britain. However, this came to a sudden end in September, when he was expelled for reasons which were never publicly stated, but are believed to revolve around unfounded suspicions that he was a police agent. He began speaking at unemployed workers' events and associated himself with the newly founded Communist Party of Ireland (CPI), which was led by his old comrade Roddy Connolly.

== Irish Civil War ==
McLoughlin was in Britain during the War of Independence, but returned to Ireland in 1922. In line with the CPI's strategy, he joined the Irish Republican Army (IRA) to fight on the anti-treaty side in the Civil War, and was given command of a column in County Cork. He was captured in December, and sentenced to death, but he was not executed and, indeed, was released in October 1923. He initially returned to work with the CPI, but this soon disbanded. McLoughlin then began working with Jim Larkin, but disapproved of Larkin's handling of an unsuccessful railway strike and decided to relocate to England.

== Later life ==
In 1924, McLoughlin moved to Hartlepool and continued speaking on communist themes, working with other former members of the SLP. He was imprisoned during the UK General Strike, but thereafter seems to have moved away from political activity. He moved to Sheffield, where he raised a family and worked for the city council through increasingly poor health.

== Commemoration ==
On 3 May 2017 a plaque was unveiled at his home in Dublin City.
