= Hettie Wheeldon =

British socialist, school teacher and anti-war campaigner (1891–1920)

- Born: Harriett Wheeldon; 25 February 1891
- Died: 13 November 1920 (aged 29)
- Occupations: Socialist, school teacher and anti-war campaigner
- Parent(s): Alice Wheeldon, mother

Hettie Wheeldon (25 February 1891 – 13 November 1920) was a British socialist, school teacher and antiwar campaigner, the daughter of Alice Wheeldon. In 1917 she was arrested and charged with conspiracy to murder David Lloyd George, the British Prime Minister, and Arthur Henderson, Minister without Portfolio in the British War Cabinet. There were three other codefendants: Hettie's mother, Alice Wheeldon, her sister Winnie, and her brother-in-law Alfred Mason. Hettie was acquitted, while the other three defendants were convicted and imprisoned.

== Life ==
Hettie Wheeldon was one of four children born to Alice Wheeldon and William Augustus Wheeldon. A school teacher in Derby and later in Ilkeston in Derbyshire, Hettie Wheeldon like her mother and siblings opposed the war, World War I and conscription. In 1916 she became Secretary of the Derby branch of the No-Conscription Fellowship, founded to assist conscientious objectors, especially in preparing their case before Military Service Tribunals.

In January 1917 Hettie – together with her mother, her sister Winnie and her brother-in-law Alfred Mason – were arrested and charged with conspiracy to kill the Prime Minister David Lloyd George and Arthur Henderson. She was acquitted.

At the time of the trial Hettie was engaged to Walt Goodman. That year she became pregnant, but had an abortion, "declaring no man was going to tie her down". In 1919 she became the Derby secretary of the Socialist Labour Party. In August 1919, her review of R. M. Fox's Factory Echoes and other Sketches for The Socialist appeared under the name Hettie McManus. She married Arthur McManus in 1920. That year she gave birth to a stillborn child, but later in the year died of peritonitis after appendicitis.
