= Alice Wheeldon =

British anti-war campaigner (1866–1919)

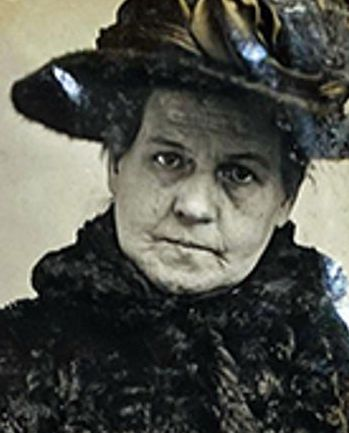
- Official police photo after Wheeldon's arrest in 1917
- Born: Alice Ann Wheeldon; 27 January 1866; Derby, England
- Died: 21 February 1919 (aged 53); Derby, England
- Occupation: Peace activist
- Family: Hettie Wheeldon, daughter

Alice Ann Wheeldon (27 January 1866 – 21 February 1919) was a British supporter of universal and women's suffrage and anti-war campaigner. She was convicted in 1917, along with her daughter, Winnie, and son-in-law, Alfred Mason, of conspiracy to murder the Prime Minister, David Lloyd George. Some of the evidence given in the case against them appears to have been fabricated on behalf of "a government eager to disgrace the anti-war movement".

== Early life and family ==
Alice Ann Marshall was born in Derby, England, the daughter of an engine driver who had worked as a house servant when young. In 1886 she married William Augustus Wheeldon, who was a widowed train driver and later a commercial traveller. They had three daughters, Nellie (born 1888), Harriette Ann (Hettie) (born 1891) and Winnie (born 1893), and a son, William Marshall (Willie, born 1892).

== Political activism ==
Wheeldon was a socialist. She was a friend of members of the Socialist Labour Party, especially John Smith Clarke although a source of membership is not known. On arrest, police reported finding copies of The Socialist and The Tribunal in her house.

She and her children, who shared her feminist political views and were active campaigners until Britain joined in the First World War. Wheeldon disagreed with the Women's Social and Political Union's (WSPU) strong support for the War and conscription. With her family, including her daughters Hettie and Winnie and son Willie, Wheeldon expressed her opposition to the War, joining the No-Conscription Fellowship.

Willie's application for exemption from military service as a conscientious objector was rejected in 1916. In 1917 he went before the Central Military Tribunal and was sentenced to two years hard labour.

The Wheeldon family supported young men opposing conscription in Derby where Alice supported the family by selling secondhand clothes in her shop at 12 Pear Tree Road, where she and her family lived – incorrectly reported as number 29.

== Arrest and trial ==
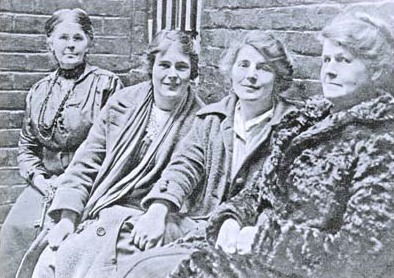
In custody at Derby Police Station, January 1917: a police matron, Hettie Wheeldon, Winnie Mason, and Alice Wheeldon

It was known that the Wheeldon family was sheltering young men "on the run" from conscription. In December 1916 'Alex Gordon', an undercover agent from P.M.S.2, arrived at the Wheeldon home, claiming to be a conscientious objector on the run. Alice Wheeldon took him in for the night and confided in him. He invented the fiction that the work camps for conscientious objectors provided under the Home Office Scheme were guarded by dogs. Gordon called his immediate superior, Herbert Booth, introducing him to Alice as an army deserter. A package containing two vials of curare and two of strychnine was sent to her. The package was intercepted and it was claimed that these chemicals were intended to kill guard dogs at a work camp. This claim formed the basis of the case against the family when the family were arrested on 30 January 1917. Alice, Hettie, Winnie and Winnie's husband, Alfred Mason, were all charged with conspiracy to murder the Liberal Prime Minister David Lloyd George and Labour Party cabinet minister Arthur Henderson.

The Attorney-General, F. E. Smith, himself, led the prosecution held in Derby Guildhall. The trial was moved to the Old Bailey, London, where he prosecuted the case in person. The trial began on 6 March 1917; Smith refused to call Gordon as a witness or divulge his name or whereabouts, thus preventing his being cross-examined.

Alice was sentenced to ten years' penal servitude, Alfred Mason (aged 24) was sentenced to seven years and Winnie (aged 23) to five years, even though the jury recommended mercy on account of their youth. Hettie was acquitted. Alice was sent to Aylesbury Prison, where she went on intermittent hunger strike; she was later moved to Holloway.

At a public meeting in London, the day after conviction 11 March 1917, the Workers Suffrage Federation (WSF) passed a resolution condemning the verdict, as their representative Sylvia Pankhurst wrote, since it was based "on the supposed evidence of an unknown spy who was not put in the witness-box". Three days after the conviction, the Amalgamated Society of Engineers published an open letter to the Home Secretary that included the following; "We demand that the Police Spies, on whose evidence the Wheeldon family is being tried, be put in the Witness Box, believing that in the event of this being done fresh evidence will be forthcoming which will put a different complexion on the case."

In New Witness, on 15 March G. K. Chesterton's editorial skewered the F. E. Smith, the Attorney-General's refusal to produce Alex Gordon for examination in court, presciently with the title 'Vanishing Spy' since the British government in fact whisked him and his wife away to South Africa. For the rest of 1917, New Witness carried more editorials and letters. After the rejected appeal in early April, a letter from Hilaire Belloc raised case law on the failure to produce the witness. Replying in support of Belloc, D. H. Prynne, who as Treasury Counsel had acted for the Director of Public Prosecutions in a 1913 case where the primary witness was also not called, referred to the decision in Wheeldon & Ors as 'A dangerous precedent'.

== Death ==
Wheeldon was released from prison on licence on 31 December 1917 at the request of Lloyd George. Her health permanently weakened, she died of influenza during the pandemic a little over a year later in 1919. At her funeral, Willie (possibly William Land, her nephew also a CO) placed a red flag over his mother's coffin and her friend John Smith Clarke, still evading police as a conscientious objector on the run, was the only speaker. Her daughters, Winnie and Hettie, were too ill to attend the funeral. Wheeldon's grave was not marked as there was concern it would be defaced.

Hettie died in 1920; in that year she had married Arthur MacManus, first chairman of the Communist Party of Great Britain.

In 1921 Willie Wheeldon joined a Friends Emergency Victims of War Relief mission going to Buzuluk, Russia. He married in Russia, took Soviet Union citizenship and became a translator for the Comintern. During the Stalinist purges, he was arrested on 5 October 1937 and shot on Christmas Day of that year.

== Memorial ==
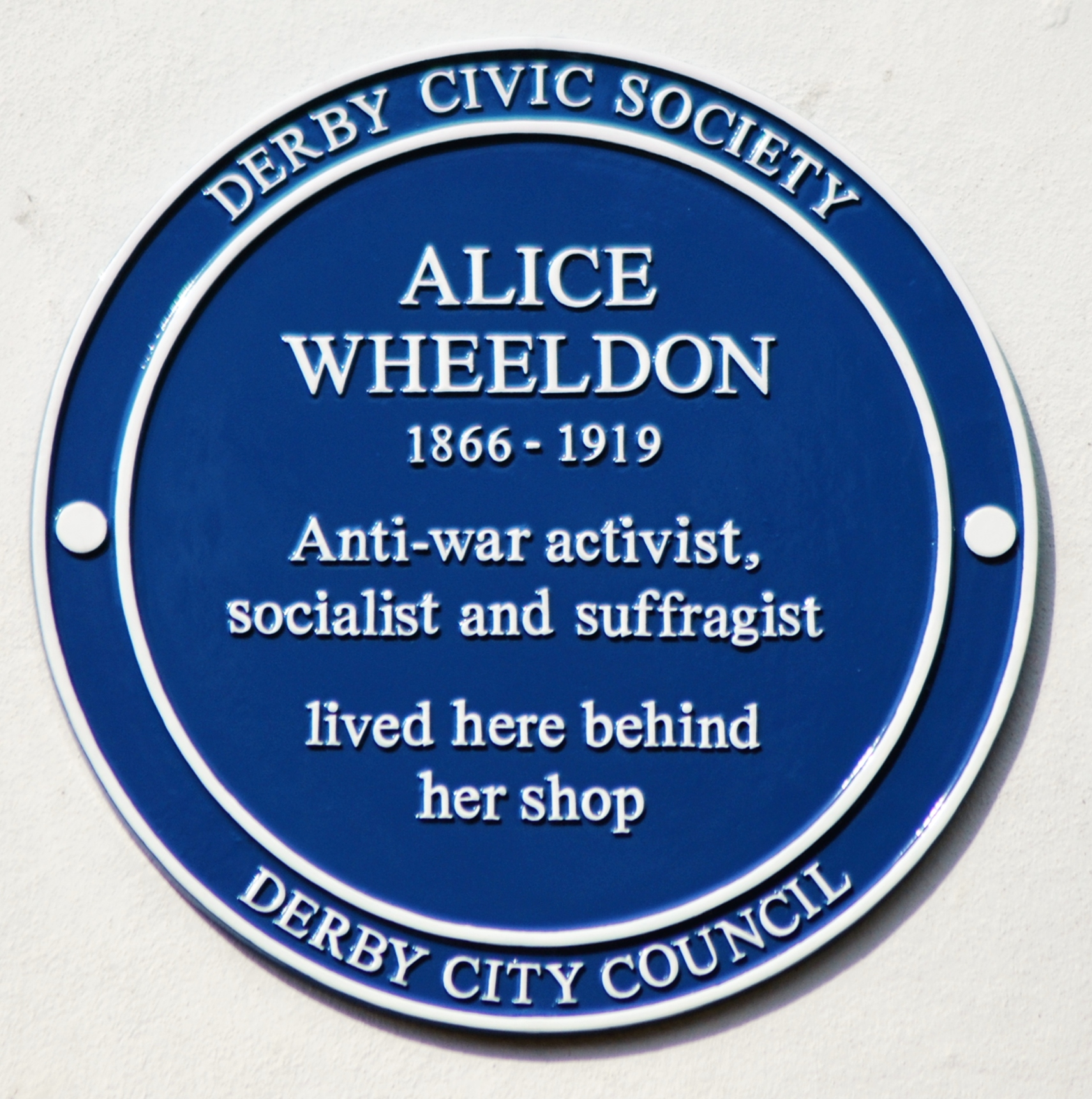
Blue Plaque on the building where Alice Wheeldon lived

In 2013 Derby City Council and Derby Civic Society erected a Blue Plaque as a memorial at 12 Pear Tree Road, Normanton, Derby.

== Legacy ==
In Derby in 2011 the Derby Peoples History Group aimed to highlight injustices in history and began a campaign to clear Alice Wheeldon's name. They also wanted a blue plaque in Derby to be erected and a tour or walk of the sites.

In January 2012 the BBC reported on a campaign to clear Wheeldon's name, quoting Dr Nicholas Hiley of the University of Kent, who said the case against her was "shaky". Hiley said that during the First World War MI5 had become "very fixated on political opposition to the war" and that the Wheeldons' unusual combination of beliefs (Marxists, atheists, vegetarians, supporters of the suffragettes and conscientious objectors), had drawn MI5's attention. Hiley described Alex Gordon (in reality William Rickard) as an "unbalanced fantasist" who was "spectacularly unreliable"; a convicted blackmailer, he had twice been declared criminally insane and was released from the high-security psychiatric Broadmoor Hospital only two years before being employed by MI5. Hiley went on to suggest that Rickard's department of MI5 was facing closure at the time of Wheeldon's arrest and the case against her and her family was fabricated to justify the department being kept open.

In 2019, after a long campaign, an application claiming a miscarriage of justice was lodged with the Criminal Cases Review Commission (CCRC).

On 15 June 2022, the BBC reported that an application for review to clear the name of the three people convicted of conspiring to kill the prime minister had failed. However, the Criminal Cases Review Commission stated that while the arguments of the submission had merit, the case was too old to justify the expense of referral to the Court of Appeal. The commission also said that "The submissions identified in the application may raise a real possibility that these convictions would be overturned." Campaigners are satisfied with the outcome. Downloads of the application, the CCRC's decision, and response to it are online.

== Bibliography ==
- "Wheeldon, Alice Ann", Oxford Dictionary of National Biography
- Jackson, John (2007) "Losing the plot", History Today, May 2007
- Rippon, Nicola, (2009) The Plot to Kill Lloyd George: The Story of Alice Wheeldon and the Peartree Conspiracy, ISBN 978-1-84563-079-9
- Rowbotham, Sheila, Friends of Alice Wheeldon (Pluto Press, 1986) ISBN 0745301568
- Rowbotham, Sheila, Friends of Alice Wheeldon - 2nd Edition, The Anti-War Activist Accused of Plotting to Kill Lloyd George (Pluto Press, 2015) ISBN 9780745335759
- Wood, Val and Whitehead, Bill (2013) "Alice Wheeldon" Derby, UCU

== See also ==
- List of suffragists and suffragettes
- Derby Catacombs - tunnel used for transport of prisoners
