= Arthur MacManus =

Scottish trade unionist and communist politician (1889–1927)

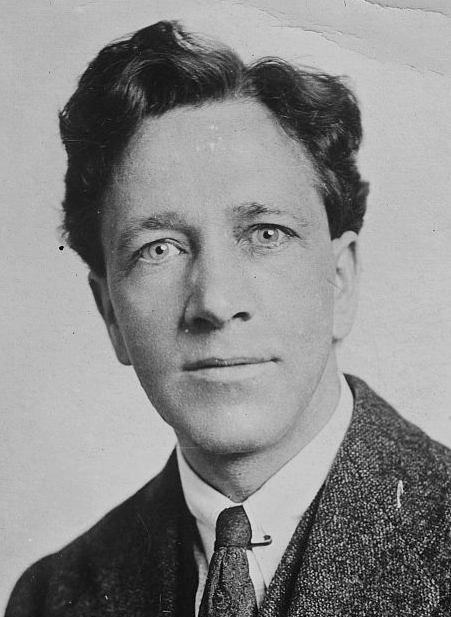
- MacManus c. 1920
- Born: 1889; Belfast, Ireland
- Died: 27 February 1927 (aged 37–38); Hampstead, London
- Resting place: Kremlin Wall Necropolis, Moscow
- Known for: Victim of the Zinoviev letter hoax. Founding member and first chairman of the Communist Party of Great Britain (CPGB)
- Criminal charges: Seditious libel, mutiny

Arthur MacManus (1889 – 27 February 1927) was a Scottish trade unionist and communist politician.

== Biography ==
=== Early years ===
Arthur MacManus was born in Belfast, Ireland, in 1889, later moving to Glasgow, Scotland, with his parents.

=== Political career ===
MacManus joined the De Leonist Socialist Labour Party (SLP) and began work at Singers in Clydebank, then known as part of the Red Clydeside. However, he was sacked in April 1911 following an unsuccessful strike.

Supporting the SLP's opposition to World War I, MacManus was arrested in 1915 at a meeting in George Square, Glasgow, for speaking against the threatened introduction of conscription.

MacManus became a leading member of the Clyde Workers Committee, and for supporting David Kirkwood in the William Beardmore and Company strike of 1916, he was one of five people deported to Edinburgh.

In the 1918 general election, MacManus stood unsuccessfully for the SLP in Halifax. Following the October Revolution, he became a proponent of a united communist party. In January 1919, he was appointed to serve on a Unity Committee, to engage in discussions on uniting with the British Socialist Party, Workers Socialist Federation and various smaller groups.

In an attempt to resolve differences between the various socialist groups, the committee proposed to form a communist party, then hold a vote on Labour Party affiliation one year later. The SLP executive publicly repudiated this proposal and decided to cease unity negotiations. Together with Tom Bell and William Paul, MacManus did not accept this. They continued to attend the negotiations, and in April 1920, formed the Communist Unity Group. In August, this became the second largest group to participate in the formation of the Communist Party of Great Britain (CPGB), and MacManus became the party's first chairman, a post he held until 1922.

In 1920, he attended a special conference of the Executive Committee of the Comintern, at which it was decided to reorganise the party. MacManus became its colonial secretary, and attended the Fourth Congress of the Comintern in September, at which he was elected to its Executive Committee and Praesidium.

In 1924, the Zinoviev letter was circulated, calling for increased communist agitation in Britain. This forgery, intended to damage the Labour Party's chances in the 1924 general election, was purportedly signed both by Grigory Zinoviev and MacManus.

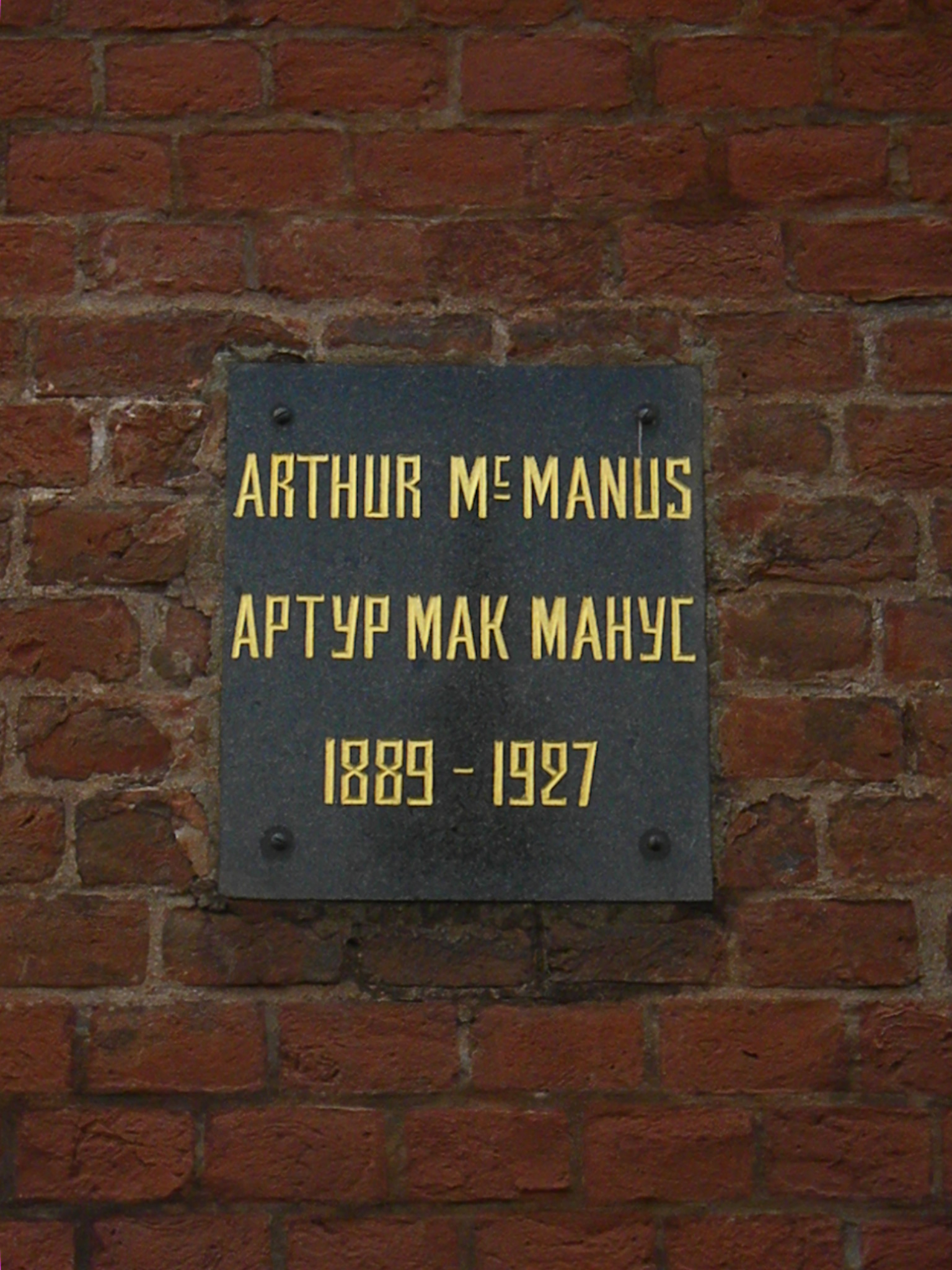
Plaque of Arthur MacManus at the Kremlin Wall

In 1925, MacManus was one of twelve CPGB officials imprisoned for seditious libel and incitement to mutiny.

MacManus was able to attend the founding conference of the League Against Imperialism in 1927, but died later in the year. His ashes were placed within the Kremlin Wall Necropolis.

== Personal life ==
In 1920, MacManus married Harriete "Hettie" Wheeldon (1891–1920), daughter of William Augustus and Alice Wheeldon of Derby, a schoolteacher who was a socialist and had been an anti-war campaigner during World War I. Within the year the couple had a child who was stillborn. Hettie later died of peritonitis following appendicitis.

== See also ==
- Campbell case
