= Missingham =

Missingham is a surname. Notable people with the surname include:

- Hal Missingham (1906–1994), Australian artist, curator and photographer
- Joanne Missingham (born 1994), Australian-born Taiwanese Go player
- William Missingham (1868–1933), Australian politician

== See also ==
- Massingham (disambiguation)
- Messingham (disambiguation)
