= Tom Bell (politician) =

Thomas Hargrave Bell (20 September 1882 – 19 April 1944) was a Scottish socialist politician and trade unionist. He is best remembered as a founding member of both the Socialist Labour Party and the Communist Party of Great Britain and as the editor of Communist Review, the official monthly magazine of the latter.

== Biography ==
=== Early years ===
Thomas Bell was born in Parkhead on the east end of Glasgow, Scotland, which was at that time still a semi-rural village. His father was a stonemason who was frequently unemployed, while his mother came from a family of coal miners and worked at home spinning cotton and silk. Young Tom enrolled in school in the spring of 1889 and left in the spring of 1894, at the age of 11, going to work first as a milk delivery boy and then as an employee at a soft drink bottling plant to help support his impoverished family.

While an employee at the bottling shop, Bell became interested in atheism and labour politics. He read rationalist works by Ernst Haeckel and Thomas Huxley as well as works on evolution by Charles Darwin and gradually became acquainted with socialist ideas. Together with two companions, Bell joined the Independent Labour Party (ILP) in 1900.

The young "socialist idealist and enthusiast" Bell found the rather mild and ameliorative program of the ILP insufficient and in 1902 he began to attend economics classes conducted by the Social Democratic Federation (SDF), headed by Henry Hyndman, which introduced Bell to the literature of Marxism. In February 1903, Bell left the ILP and enrolled as a member of the SDF.

Some of the SDF classes which Bell attended were led by George Yates, an engineer by trade who impressed the young Bell with his skill as an orator and knowledge of economics, history, and politics. In the spring of 1903, Bell would follow Yates and the group of revolutionary socialist impossiblists around him out of the SDF and join in the foundation of the Socialist Labour Party, a rival organization.

Bell began a seven-year apprenticeship as an iron moulder, but left after nine months to another foundry, where he exaggerated the duration of his previous experience and gained a job on somewhat more favourable terms. After two years there, he went to another foundry that made gas engines, completing his seven-year apprenticeship and joining the Associated Ironmoulders of Scotland in August 1904.

Committed to educating himself, he attended Andersonian College and the Academy of Literature, and soon lectured for the Plebs' League.

=== Political career ===
Bell joined the Independent Labour Party in 1900, then moved in 1903 to the Marxist Social Democratic Federation. However, within months, he joined with other dissident members to form the Glasgow Socialist Society, soon renamed the Socialist Labour Party (SLP). He became a leading figure in the party, but was expelled in 1907 for arguing that the SLP should not favour the Industrial Workers of the World. He was able to rejoin the following year, convincing the majority of the party to form the Advocates of Industrial Unionism.

Generally continuing to work in the metal trades, Bell briefly joined the Singer Company to organise for the Industrial Workers of Great Britain, but was sacked following the failure of a strike in 1911.

In 1916, Bell was elected to the Clyde Workers Committee, within which he promoted the SLP's policy of industrial unionism. In 1917, he led a successful national strike of engineers and foundry workers. Again prominent in 1919, he was elected President of the Associated Ironmoulders, Secretary of the SLP and editor of its newspaper, The Socialist. He sat on a unity committee, intending to negotiate for a single communist party with leaders of the British Socialist Party, Workers Socialist Federation and other socialist groups, but their proposals were repudiated by the SLP. Resigning as Secretary, he helped found the Communist Unity Group, which became an original constituent of the Communist Party of Great Britain (CPGB).

Employed by the CPGB, he was initially National Organiser. He then attended the Third World Congress of the Communist International, visiting Moscow for five months, despite the British Government denying him a visa. He was elected as the CPGB's representative to the Comintern's Executive Committee. He returned to Soviet Russia for the 4th World Congress, remaining in the city as a CPGB representative and reporter, until the end of 1922.

Bell held various posts within the party, including the editorship of Communist Review. In 1925, he was one of twelve CPGB leaders gaoled for seditious libel and incitement to mutiny, spending six months inside.

The next few years were spent between Britain and Russia. In 1930, Bell became the Secretary of the Friends of the Soviet Union, and in 1937 he wrote a history of the CPGB.

=== Death and legacy ===
Tom Bell died 19 April 1944 aged 61.

== Sources consulted ==
- Tom Bell: Radical Glasgow
- Encyclopedia of Marxism: Glossary of People

Party political offices
Preceded by Leonard Cotton	Secretary of the Socialist Labour Party; 1918 – 1919	Succeeded by Tom Mitchell
Preceded by New position	National Organiser of the Communist Party of Great Britain; 1920 - 1921	Succeeded by Bob Stewart
