= Alex Gordon (police agent) =

Alex Gordon was a police agent recruited by Herbert Booth, of P.M.S.2. (related to MI5) in 1916 to infiltrate the labour and anti-war movement which was proving more effective after the introduction of conscription in the United Kingdom.

Gordon's first assignment was the infiltration of the Industrial Workers of the World. In 1916, his notorious assignment was the 1917 Wheeldon case. In the House of Commons, William Anderson MP continued asking questions about 'Gordon''s work, finishing with: "whether an assurance will be given that 'Alex Gordon' will not in future be employed in any capacity by the government".

Months after a "most repellent incident" 'Gordon' being "withheld from the witness-box in the Wheeldon trial after being used as an instrument for getting a conviction", The Nation (edited by Henry William Massingham) demanded: "who set this man to work? what is his identity?"

The name Alex Gordon was one of the aliases for William Rickard. In 1915, using another alias, 'Francis Vivian' his poem "When Beauty withers" was published in The Story-Teller, a monthly magazine. Relevantly, this magazine had published a short story "The Invisible Enemy" where the poisoning of the victim was to apply poison to a nail inserted into the victim's boot. For the Wheeldon trial, "Gordon"'s police statement claimed that Alice Wheeldon suggestion for administering poison to David Lloyd George was to use the method of inserting a poisoned nail-in-the-boot.
