= Frank Budgen =

English painter, writer, and socialist activist (1882-1971)

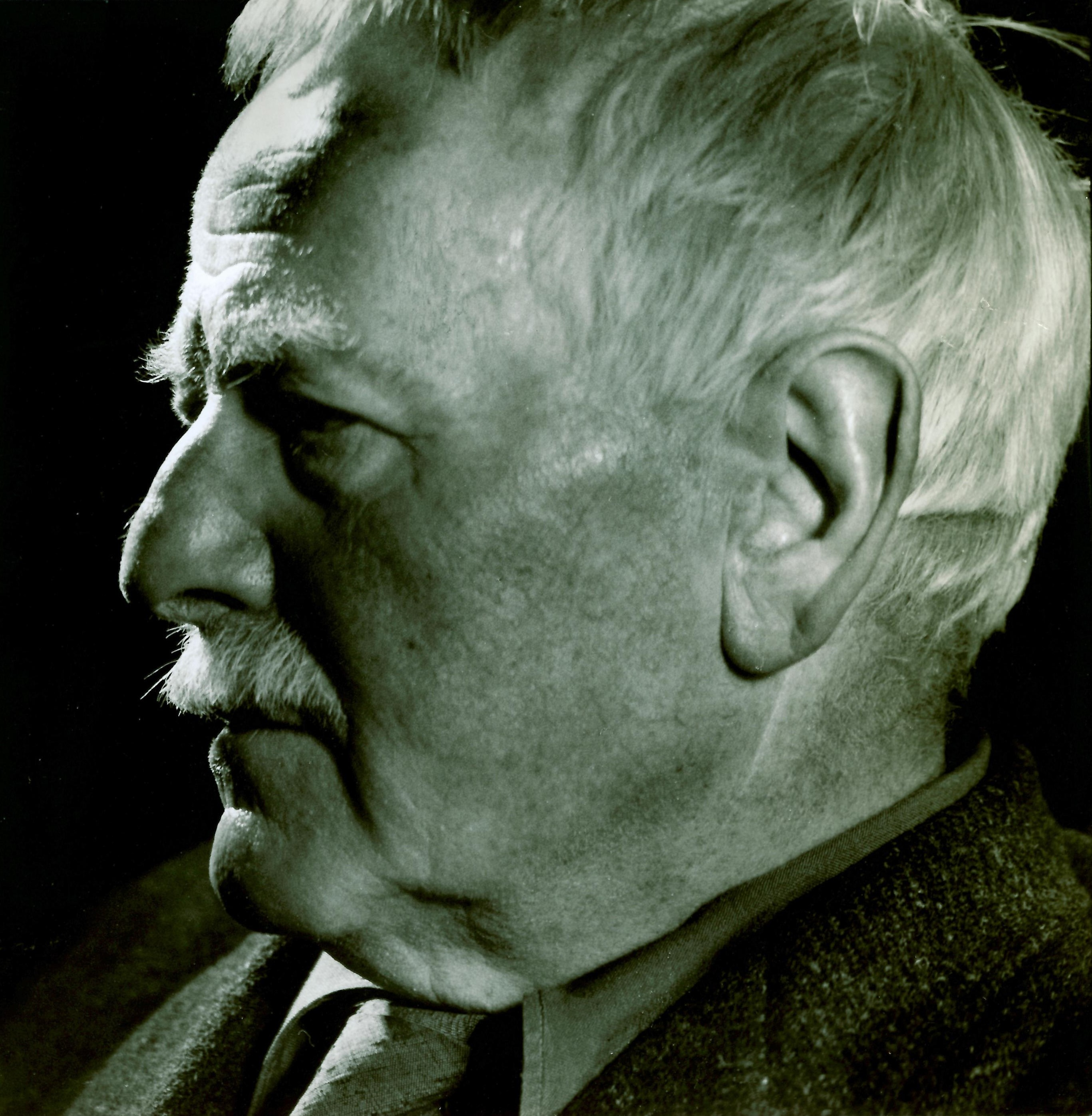
Portrait session of Frank Budgen with Rosemarie Streuli in Zurich 1962

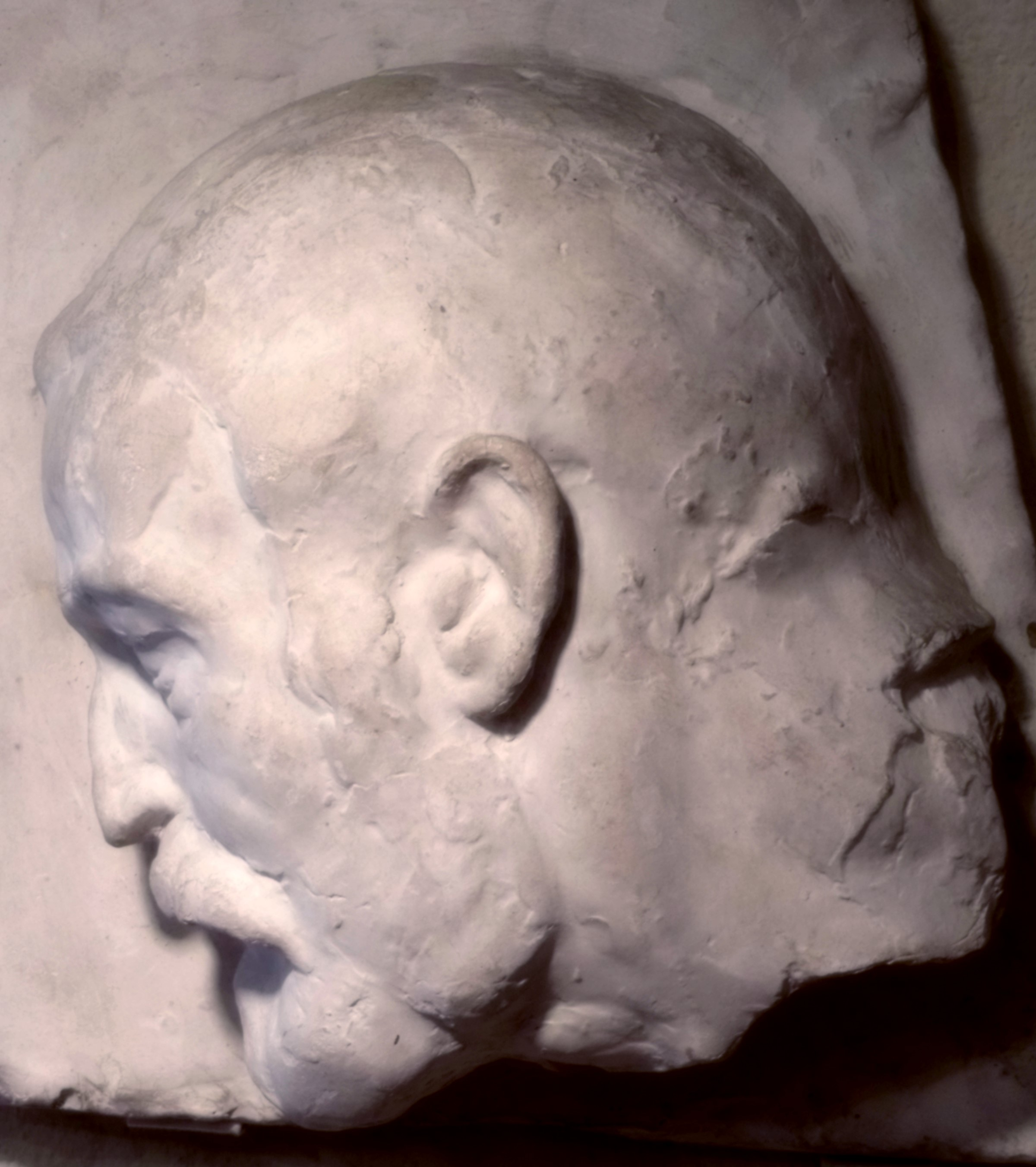
Plaster head by August Suter (1927), August-Suter-Museum, Eptingen

Frank Spencer Curtis Budgen (1 March 1882 – 26 April 1971) was an English painter, writer and socialist activist acquainted with the author James Joyce.

== Life ==
Born in Crowhurst, Surrey, Budgen spent six years at sea before working in London as a postal worker. He changed jobs a number of times before travelling to Paris in 1910 to study painting. He supported himself there by working as a model for the Swiss sculptor August Suter (1887-1965) and became acquainted with the French writer Blaise Cendrars and the Swiss poet and translator Siegfried Lang. At the invitation of August Suter he moved to Switzerland shortly before World War I. Here he was employed by the British government at the Ministry of Information, an institution established in Zürich for "the spread of British propaganda in neutral countries." He returned to London after the war, where he remained until his death. Budgen was a member of the Socialist Labour Party and eventually its general secretary. He translated and published the first cheap edition of The Communist Manifesto with Lily G. Aitken. Budgen never lost contact with his Swiss friends and paid several visits to Switzerland to meet August and Paul Suter as well as Siegfried Lang. He was a guest of honour at the first James-Joyce-Symposium in Dublin in 1967.

Frank Budgen was married to Francine Budgen (11 June 1896 – 16 April 1977), who was Jewish and Belgian, and had shared political interests. They had a daughter called Joan.

Joyce and Budgen spent much of the war in the same city, Zurich, and similar social circles of artists, writers and musicians. According to Budgen's 1934 memoir James Joyce and the Making of Ulysses, Joyce regularly discussed aesthetic matters with him, often referring to the content of Joyce's A Portrait of the Artist as a Young Man, Ulysses and Finnegans Wake. The last of these three, Budgen stated, Joyce referred to at the time as Work in Progress; indeed a number of the conversations he reports as having had with Joyce imply that the author was working out the form and content of this work in part by arguing with Budgen. Budgen produced several portraits of Joyce. One from 1919 is held by the National Gallery of Ireland and was used as the frontispiece of his 1934 memoir.

Joyce scholar Clive Hart wrote about him:

One of Budgen's many fine qualities was a gift for making new friendships with people of all ages. Although he used occasionally to grumble about the unfortunate effects of technological progress on the quality of life in London and elsewhere, he never failed, even in his last years, to welcome new life, new experience. In his thirties, when he and Joyce were closest, Budgen must have been a most stimulating companion. Even in his eighties he was an excellent man at a party, enjoying the company of people of all kinds, being lionized by many of the men and by virtually all of the women, talking with zest, listening (as few people do) with equal zest. It was when he was in the company of a number of his friends that one saw most clearly the vigorous, intelligent, endlessly curious man whom Joyce had known.

Frank and Francine Budgen are buried at the graveyard of St George’s Church, Crowhurst, Surrey.

== Paintings and drawings ==
- St Peter's Church, Belsize Park, (1900) Burgh House and Hampstead Museum
- Finnegans Wake, oil, Fales Library & Special Collections, Bobst Library, New York University
- Selfportrait of Budgen with James Joyce (1918), Zurich James Joyce Foundation
- Portrait of James Joyce, oil on canvas, d. 1919, National Gallery of Ireland.
- Portrait of James Joyce, oil, undated. Lockwood Memorial Library, State University of New York.
- 16 charcoal drawings of human figures, male and female, an oil painting of James Joyce, and a series of three oils of James and Nora Joyce are owned by the Harry Ransom Center at the University of Texas at Austin

== Literary works ==
- James Joyce and the Making of Ulysses with a portrait of James Joyce and four drawings to Ulysses by the author, 1934
- Myselves When Young (London: Oxford UP, 1970)

== Recording ==
- My Friend James Joyce - a spoken appreciation, Decca Record Co., London 1961

Party political offices
| Preceded by Neil Maclean | Secretary of the Socialist Labour Party; 1908–1910 | Succeeded by Leonard Cotton |
