= Mary McLoughlin =

Irish revolutionary (1901–1956)

- Born: 1901
- Died: 1956 (aged 54–55)
- Known for: Participation in Easter Rising

Mary McLoughlin (1901–1956) was one of the women who actively served in the 1916 Easter Rising. The younger sister of the famed "Boy Commandant General" Sean McLoughlin, at fifteen years old, she served as a dispatcher during the uprising, running messages between the various outposts held by the rebels. She is one of about 2000 participants of the Easter Rising who gave witness statements to document the events in the 1950s, after Ireland gained its independence.

== Background ==
McLoughlin was born in a working-class neighborhood of Dublin, one of the six children of Patrick and Christina McLoughlin. Patrick "Ruggie" McLoughlin was a coal laborer and active union organizer. He took part in the Dublin lock-out of 1913, and was one of the founders of the Irish Transport and General Workers' Union (ITGWU). Union work became a family tradition for the following generations as well. Christina was an ardent republican, and imparted her ideology to her family. However, their oldest son, Danny, enlisted in the British military to fight in World War I, possibly as an act of rebellion against his parents. Danny was wounded in action, and lost his eyesight. His younger brother, Sean, however, became an active republican. He started out in the youth movement Fianna Éireann, the scouts movement founded by Constance Markievicz. He later joined the Gaelic League, and the Irish Republican Brotherhood. He was a commander in the Easter Rising, and later became a well-known communist leader in England. McLoughlin's younger brother, Patrick, joined the IRA during the Irish War of Independence (1919–1921); her youngest sister and brother, Christina and Christy, followed their father into union work.

== The Easter Rising ==
McLoughlin, who worked as a shop assistant, was a member of the Clan na Gael the girls' scout group of the Hibernian Rifles, made up of girls too young to join Cumann na mBan. In the days before the Easter Rising, she and her compatriots assisted in the preparations for the fight, moving arms to and from safe houses. On the day itself, the girls went on a marching drill outside of Dublin, but upon their return discovered the fighting had begun. McLoughlin and some fellow scouts reported for duty at St Stephen's Green, which was held by the rebels. There, they met Markievicz, who assigned them tasks. Some of the girls were as young as 12 years old, and elected to go home. McLoughlin was sent to retrieve ammunition from a rebel house, and after that her scout commander, May Kelly, sent her to the rebel headquarters at the General Post Office (GPO).

At the GPO, the Commandant General James Connolly sent her to get situation reports from the other rebel outposts, and also to try and find them food. At each stop, however, she was told that was they needed was more ammunition. She set out with Julia Grenan and Elizabeth O'Farrell to smuggle ammunition to the rebels, which they hid in their undergarments. For the next two days, she went from post to post distributing what food she could find, as the rebels' situation became more dire, as the fighting continued and they ran out of supplies. Together with Hanna Sheehy-Skeffington, she spent an entire day dragging potato sacks from the GPO to the Surgeon's College.

The next day, McLoughlin was taken to Joseph Plunkett, who handed her a missive and warned her not to get caught with it, and swallow it if needed. She then met the high commander of the Rising, Patrick Pearse, who put his hand on her head and blessed her on her way. She was to pass the message to Thomas MacDonagh, but it was John MacBride who took it. On the fourth day, her brother Sean arrived at the GPO and told her that their mother was desperately looking for her, and had no idea what had happened to her since the start of the Rising. McLoughlin, however, continued her work, and took another message to Jacob's. On the way, she found a discarded revolver, and continued along her way armed. She decided to go the long way back, and stop by her mother's on the way to reassure her, but her mother locked her in a room to keep her safe. McLoughlin was determined to bring the gun to the GPO, and escaped through a window.

When she arrived at the GPO, she ran into a boy from Fianna Éireann, and the two joked around with the gun. An adult man reprimanded them, pointing out that he lost use of his arm from such a gun, and she discovered it was the republican leader Tom Clarke speaking to her. She handed the gun over to Connolly, who commended her. The next day, she continued her work as a dispatcher. The downtown area was demolished at this point, and the fighting was almost over. She was given a factory overall to hide her Clan na Gael uniform, in order to avoid arrest by British soldiers. As it happened, she was stopped and taken by soldiers, but they did not realize her role in the Rising. They took her to a house for her protection, but became suspicious when she wouldn't change her clothes. The next day, Saturday, she was taken before a magistrate who questioned her regarding her presence in the area. She said she was on her way home from school. She was given a pass to get through the barricades to her family home, but she went rejoin the rebels. However, before she arrived there, she saw republicans who had evacuated the Four Courts complex, who told her the rebellion was over. When she went home, she found the house occupied by the military, who had evacuated her family to a local school, where she joined them.

== After the Rising ==
Mary McLouchlin was among the approximately 2000 rebels who provided witness statements to the Bureau of Military History regarding their roles in the Easter Rising of 1916. The bureau's archive is the largest collection of images, testimonies, and documents about the Rising. When the time came for McLoughlin to sign her statement, she was on her deathbed, and her account was witnessed by a friend in lieu of her signing it.

McLoughlin died a short while later, in 1956.
