= Henry William Massingham =

British journalist (1860–1924)

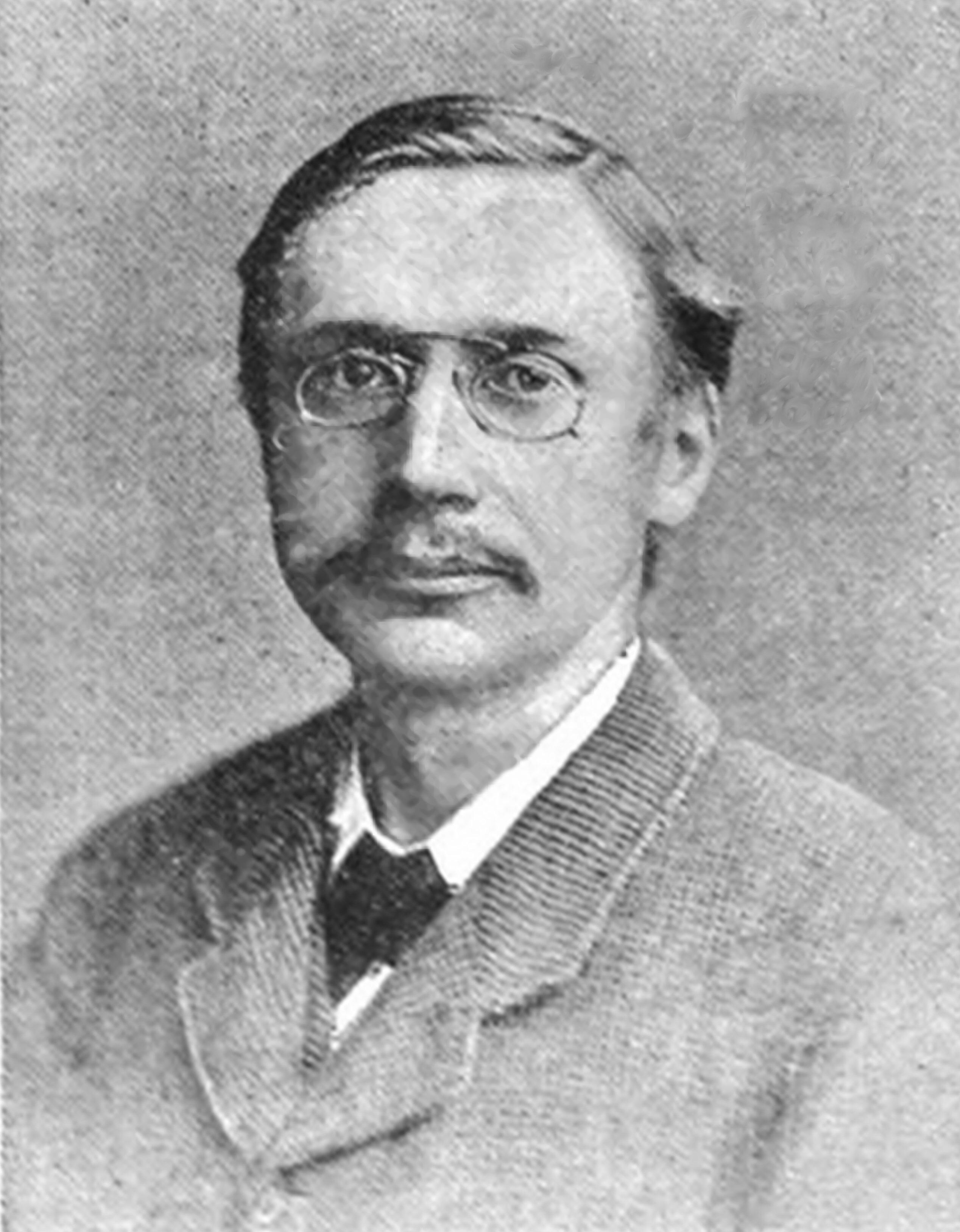
- Born: 25 May 1860
- Died: 27 August 1924 (aged 64)
- Occupation: Journalist
- Political party: Labour (later); Liberal (early)

Henry William Massingham (25 May 1860 – 27 August 1924) was an English journalist, editor of The Nation from 1907 to 1923. In his time it was considered the leading British Radical weekly.

== Life ==
He joined London paper The Star in 1888, and was promoted to editor in 1890. In 1888 as deputy editor to T. P. O'Connor he had given George Bernard Shaw his break in journalism, appointing him deputy drama critic to Belfort Bax.

He edited the Daily Chronicle 1897–1899, but in November 1899 was forced out because his editorial line on the Second Boer War was hostile to the government.

His departure from The Nation was a matter of party politics: he had broken from the Liberals under David Lloyd George, in favour of the Labour Party. A change of ownership was putting control in the hands of John Maynard Keynes, a Liberal. In July 1914, with the threat of war and refusal of the government to deny the possibility of British involvement, Massingham and H. N. Brailsford voiced their opposition to intervention in The Nation as did other Liberals in the Manchester Guardian, The Economist, and Daily News. In 1917, as editor signing himself 'A.Wayfarer' wrote of the use of "Alec Gordon", withheld from the witness box, in the Wheeldon trial after 'being used as an instrument in getting a conviction." Giving an account of questions in the Commons (William Anderson MP for a Sheffield constituency) as to "Gordon" being a 'provoking agent', Massingham details the statements by Labor leaders about similar conspiratorial approaches made by "Gordon" ('to kidnap the Prime Minister'), demanding to know what action is taken, since 'a graver charge has not been made against a British administration since the days of Peterloo.'

Massingham during the short remainder of his life was a columnist, in the Christian Science Monitor and The Spectator.

== Family ==
Massingham married Emma Jane Snowdon by whom he had his family. After her death he married her sister Ellen Snowdon. They were two of the daughters of Henry Snowdon of St. Leonards Priory in Norwich.

Massingham was also the father of Dr. Richard Massingham who became well known for his direction of public information films at about the time of World War II. The writer Harold J. Massingham was another son, and the playwright and actress Dorothy Massingham was his daughter.

Media offices
Preceded by T. P. O'Connor	Editor of The Star; 1890–1891	Succeeded by Ernest Parke
Preceded by Alfred Ewen Fletcher	Editor of the Daily Chronicle; 1895 – 1899	Succeeded by W. J. Fisher
