= Parliamentary Military Secretary Department, No. 2 Section =

Parliamentary Military Secretary Department, No.2 Section (P.M.S.2.), was developed from the Ministry of Munitions Labour Intelligence Division, part of British intelligence unit during World War I to protect British manufacturing industry, especially munitions manufacturing, from sabotage. PMS2 was short lived after a scandal in 1917 involving unprofessional agents.

== Lead up to creation ==
During World War I the money spent on intelligence within Britain rose rapidly. MI5 July 1914 was budgeted £6-7000, and Special Branch had a budget of £19,000. By November 1918 both organisations had an allocated £200,000 between them (equivalent to £9,826,000 in 2025).

There were many intelligence organisations, and the money spent on each somewhat resulted in overlapping of information received by the different investigations, however it was seen as worthwhile practice. With the war by 1915 turned into one of attrition much attention was paid to factories, especially those involved in war munitions, against the threat of German espionage.

The first investigations and fears into industrial sabotage existed around 1915 with the changing nature of the war; the sector was keen to protect the most vital components of the war machine, and with fears of a mass German infiltration of Britain still rife much effort was diverted to protecting munitions manufacturing. Even if by 1914 Special Branch had ruled that there was no evidence to support any mass organised attacks. Money seemed to be spent on prejudice and fear; rather than any substantial evidence.

== Creation ==
A further investigation came with reports of a fire in the Ardeer factory of Nobel’s explosive company; this was blamed on sabotage rather than the poor design, hurried construction, and improvisation of plant equipment that it was later traced back to. However after a second incident at a different plant Woolwich Arsenal in early 1915, David Lloyd George was set on blaming alien actors; this led to the creation of the Ministry of Munitions Labour Intelligence Division (MMLI) on 19 February 1916.

MMLI's function at first was clear; however, later it would develop different roles. At the beginning, MMLI's role was dedicated to the examination of aliens working in factories and munitions plants, effectively becoming a secret part of the employment process for this kind of work. However, by May 1916, there was a radical change in direction for the organisation. After some Labour leaders started to oppose the Munitions of War Act, intelligence shifted from solely finding German agents, to trying to protect against industrial action too, focusing left on the political spectrum.

PMS2 was attached to Colonel Arthur Lee, Parliamentary Military Secretary to the Ministry of Munitions and in practice operated as a branch of MI5.

This new role was a creation of a new strike on 17 March 1916, what would affect the war machine greatly. Although the service still believed German agents were behind the unrest, it began to investigate.

== Reform ==
In June, 1916, MMLI changed its name so P.M.S.2 (parliamentary military security department, No.2) on the grounds of containing as much information about the organisation from the public as possible. There was also subtle transformation in the unit to investigate sabotage, strikes, and labour unrest. Lieutenant Frederick de Valda was quoted with saying ‘The object if P.M.S.2 was political: to keep an eye on foreign agitators and guard munitions and other important establishments against sabotage and other interference agitators or enemy agents’.

== Fall of P.M.S.2 ==
By September 1916, the methods used became undercover and somewhat questionable. An agent would pose as a conscientious objector on the run from the police, with the guise to make contact with left-wing groups in the labour market. By December, the ministry started to have doubts about the effectiveness of this campaign. However, in December 1916 'Alex Gordon' (Rickard), an undercover agent reporting to Herbert Booth, claimed to have discovered ‘A plot to kill David Lloyd George the Prime Minister and Arthur Henderson’ leading to charges against four people, including Alice Wheeldon. Their arrests were widely publicised, the methods used by the undercover agent 'Alex Gordon' was recognised by labour groups and extensively attacked in the House of Commons, for fomenting discontent and suspicion, being agent provocateurs, causing embarrassment to the government. Nonetheless, in March 1917, three of the defendants were convicted and imprisoned.

In April 1917 Rickard was sent to South Africa with his wife. During 1917, the MP for Leicester, Ramsay MacDonald, pursued the government to reveal the identity of 'Alex Gordon'.

On Rickard's departure, the Home Office ordered that Special Branch should have the sole responsibility of all sensitive investigations. By 23 April 1917, P.M.S.2 was shut down and its functions were taken over by the War Office and Scotland Yard.
