= The Lake (play) =

British play written by Dorothy Massingham and Murray MacDonald

The Lake is a British play written by Dorothy Massingham and Murray MacDonald. It was first produced in the West End of London on March 1, 1933; directed by Tyrone Guthrie, it starred Marie Ney and ran successfully through to September 16. The play's chief author, Dorothy Massingham, killed herself in the same month the play opened.

It debuted on Broadway at the Martin Beck Theatre on December 26, 1933 and was one of acting legend Katharine Hepburn's first major Broadway roles. Directed by Jed Harris, the notorious "big bad wolf" of American theater, the play was a critical and popular flop, though it had a respectable run of 55 nights, closing in February 1934. Hepburn in particular drew sharp rebukes in the newspapers, many of which were penned by the same critics who loved her in The Warrior's Husband. Columnist Dorothy Parker famously remarked that Hepburn "ran the gamut of emotions — from A to B." Despite the poor response, Harris decided to take the show to Chicago, saying to Hepburn, "My dear, the only interest I have in you is the money I can make out of you." Hepburn refused, and paid Harris everything she had, $13,675, to close the production instead. Hepburn later referred to Harris as "hands-down the most diabolical person I have ever met", and claimed this experience was important in teaching her to take responsibility for her career.

In 1937, Hepburn included a line from The Lake in the film Stage Door, thus making fun of her biggest failure. The line became one of Hepburn's signature catchphrases: "The calla lilies are in bloom again, such a strange flower, suitable to any occasion..."

== Adaptations ==
In 1933, the play was presented in the Martin Beck Theatre in a version rewritten for American audiences.
