= Richard Massingham =

British actor (1898–1953)

- Screenshot from Coughs and Sneezes, a 1945 PIF directed by, and starring Richard Massingham.
- Born: 31 January 1898; Sleaford, Lincolnshire, England
- Died: 1 April 1953 (aged 55); Biddenden, Kent, England
- Occupations: medical doctor, filmmaker

Richard Massingham (31 January 1898 – 1 April 1953) was a British medical doctor who is principally known for starring in public information films made in the 1940s and early 1950s.

== Life ==
Massingham was born in Sleaford, Lincolnshire. After working in medicine and making amateur films, Massingham set up Public Relationship Films Ltd in 1938 when he noticed that there was no specialist agency making short educational films for the public. In the films he typically played a bumbling character who was slightly more stupid than average, and often explained the message of the film through demonstrating the risks if it was ignored. Films' topics included postal deliveries, how to cross the road, how to prevent the spread of diseases, how to swim and how to drive without causing the road to be unsafe for other users. He died in Biddenden, Kent.

== Family ==
Massingham's father was H.W. Massingham (1860–1924) the journalist, and his siblings included writer Harold John Massingham (1888–1952), writer Hugh Massingham (1905–1971) and playwright and actress Dorothy Massingham (1889–1933). He was the son of Emma Jane née Snowdon, the daughter of Henry Snowdon of St Leonard's Priory, Norwich.

== Selected films ==
- Dr Massingham says... Tell Me If It Hurts (1934)
- And So To Work (1936)
- The Daily Round (1937)
- Surviving the War: The Five Inch Bather (1942)
- In Which We Live: Being the Life Story of a Suit Told by Itself (1943)
- Post Early for Christmas (1943)
- Elopement in France (1944)
- An Englishman's home... Down at the Local (1945)
- Coughs and Sneezes (1945)
- Post-war Blues: The Daily Grind: Pool of Contentment (1946)
- Pedal Cyclists (1947)
- Watch Your Meters (1947)
- Jet-propelled Germs (1948)
- Pedestrian Crossing (1948)
- Post-war Blues: What a Life! (1948)
- 30 Miles an Hour (1949)
- Another Case of Poisoning (1949)
- Handkerchief Drill (1949)
- Warning to Travellers (1949)
- The Cure (1950)
- Help Yourself (1950)
- Moving House (1950)
- Introducing the New Worker (1951)

His short films are collected in the BFI DVD "How to be Eccentric: The Essential Richard Massingham" (2015).

== In popular culture ==
The animator Cyriak Harris created his animation Breakfast using samples of footage from Massingham's Pedestrian Crossing film: mainly, a shot of a seated Massingham eating breakfast in the middle of a pedestrian crossing, just as a passing car slams into his card table, spilling the contents everywhere.
