= George Yates (socialist) =

George S. Yates was a British socialist politician.

== Biography ==
An engineering draughtsperson, Yates became an active trade unionist in Leith, Scotland, and joined the Social Democratic Federation (SDF). By 1898, he was identified as a member of the left wing of the party, and began lecturing alongside James Connolly.

In 1900, he was a delegate to the Congress of the Second International, where he was the only British delegate to vote against a motion supporting Alexandre Millerand's decision to join the French government.

Becoming a convinced supporter of industrial unionism, Yates argued alongside Connolly for the SDF adopting the policies of Daniel De Leon. He supported the SDF's withdrawal from the Labour Representation Committee in 1901.

In 1903, he wrote an article in Connolly's paper, The Socialist entitled "The Official SDF", which was critical of the organisation's Executive. He was promptly expelled. This was the trigger which provoked the a group of impossibilist SDF members, mostly in Scotland, to form the Socialist Labour Party, within which Yates became a leading figure and editor of The Socialist. In September 1904, Yates resigned his position, claiming that he was unable to edit the paper while holding down a full-time job.
