= Industrial Workers of Great Britain =

Former trade union of the United Kingdom

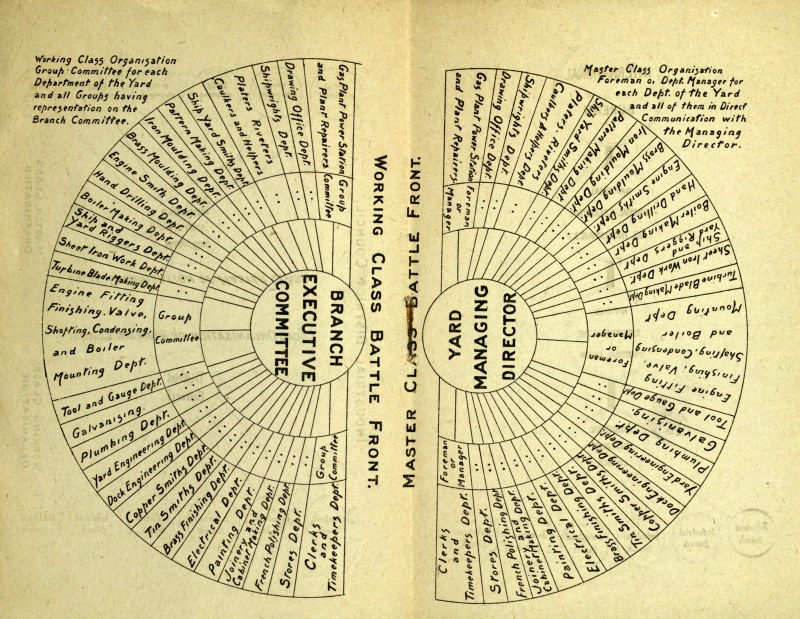
- Diagram published by the Industrial Workers of Great Britain explaining industrial unionism in terms of two opposing battle fronts.
- Abbreviation: IWGB
- Formation: 1906; 120 years ago
- Founder: Socialist Labour Party
- Dissolved: 1924; 102 years ago
- Purpose: Industrial unionism
- General Secretary: Tom Bell
- Affiliations: Workers International Industrial Union
- Formerly called: British Advocates of Industrial Unionism

The Industrial Workers of Great Britain was a group which promoted industrial unionism in the early 20th century.

The Industrial Workers of the World (IWW) was founded in Chicago in 1905. It called for industrial unionism and aimed to organise workers in all industries, and many of its activists were members of the Socialist Labor Party of America. The British Socialist Labour Party had been founded in 1903 by Scottish supporters of Daniel de Leon, a leading figure in the American SLP and the IWW. In 1906, the British party formally adopted a policy of industrial unionism.

In 1906, the British SLP founded the British Advocates of Industrial Unionism (BAIU), a small propaganda organisation which called for the formation of revolutionary unions in the pattern of the IWW. The group was officially launched in August 1907, with Tom Bell as its secretary.

In 1908, the IWW split into Chicago- and Detroit-based organisations. In Britain, E. J. B. Allen and his supporters mirrored the Chicago section's call for the cessation of political activity which was not channelled through trade unions. They founded the Industrialist League and developed links with the Chicago-based IWW.

The BAIU was refounded as the "Industrial Workers of Great Britain" (IWGB) in 1909. The group also changed tactics: instead of campaigning for trade unions to voluntarily dissolve themselves into a new industrial union, it aimed to recruit workers directly into local groups of the organisation until it had sufficient numbers to form genuine industrial unions. Even before the name change, the group had received some support in three large factories: Singer's Sewing Machine Company in Clydebank, the Argyll Motor Works in Alexandria and the Albion Motor Works in Scotstoun, all near Glasgow. By the end of the decade, the group claimed a membership of 4,000 at Singer's alone.

In early 1911, a woman working at Singer's was dismissed. In line with the principle of "an injury to one is an injury to all", the IWGB called a strike which resulted in the factory management locking out all the workers. Faced with militant opposition, Singer's organised a postal vote asking staff whether they wished to return to work. While the IWGB attempted to disrupt the vote, asking workers to instead return voting cards to them, the management claimed that a majority wished to end the strike. Workers began to return, the strike was defeated, and leading members of the IWGB at the factory were sacked.

The IWGB remained close to the Detroit-based IWW of De Leon, and when that group renamed itself the Workers International Industrial Union (WIIU), they became the British affiliate and similarly changed their name. The group regained some influence in Glasgow in the run-up to World War I, now led by T. L. Smith. Tom Bell saw the Red Clydeside movement and the Clyde Workers Committee as its most important continuation.

The British Socialist Labour Party and the WIIU saw their membership shrink dramatically after the war, as many activists joined the newly founded Communist Party of Great Britain. In 1923, the WIIU supported John Maclean's Industrial Unity Committee, which also advocated industrial unionism, but it retained significant doubts about the enterprise and left almost immediately. The American WIIU disbanded in 1924, and the British group appears to have followed suit.
