= Dorothy Massingham =

British actress and playwright

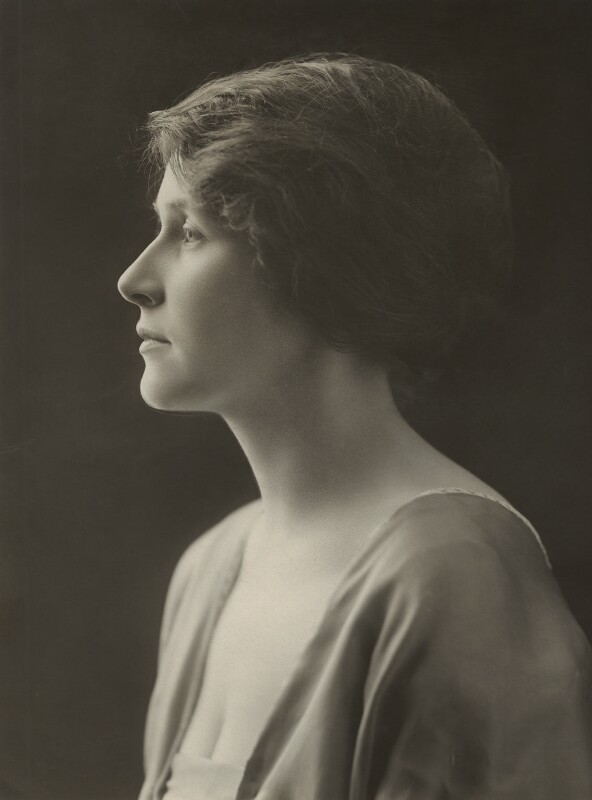
- Born: December 12, 1889; Highgate
- Died: March 30, 1933 (aged 43); Hampstead
- Occupation: Playwright, actor
- Parent(s): Henry William Massingham

Dorothy Massingham (12 December 1889 – 30 March 1933) was a British actress and playwright.

Dorothy Massingham was born on 12 December 1889 in Highgate, daughter of the journalist H. W. Massingham and Emma Snowdon. She was educated at the Graham High Street School and the Academy for Dramatic Art and studied under Rosina Filippi.

Her stage debut was in February 1912 at the Liverpool Reparatory Theatre as Kalleia in Alfred Sutro's The Perplexed Husband. She then appeared as Mrs. Perrin in Charles McEvoy's The Situation at Newbury. Her London debut was in 1913 at the Vaudeville Theatre as Claire in the debut of George Bernard Shaw's Great Catherine: Whom Glory Still Adores.

From 1917 to 1919 she performed with the Birmingham Repertory Theatre. Her roles there included the title character in Lady Windermere's Fan and Gwendoline in The Importance of Being Earnest by Oscar Wilde, Viola in Twelfth Night and Hero in Much Ado About Nothing by Shakespeare, the title character in Everyman, Flora Lloyd in The Honeymoon by Arnold Bennett, Monica Somerset in the premiere of St. George and the Dragons (1918) by Eden Phillpotts, and the second chronicler in the premiere of Abraham Lincoln (1918) by John Drinkwater.

In the early 1920s she appeared in a number of venues. She starred as Margaret Knox in Shaw's Fanny's First Play and as Julia Craven in Shaw's The Philanderer at the Everyman Theatre, as Lady Adela in the premiere of John Galsworthy's Loyalties at St Martins Theatre, as Alcmena in John Dryden's Amphitryon at Daly's Theatre, as Lucretia in Dryden's The Assignation at the Aldwych Theatre, as Lady Medway in Frances Sheridan's The Discovery at the Royal Academy of Dramatic Art, as Gertrude in Shakespeare's Hamlet at the Kingsway Theatre, and as Helena in Anton Chekhov's Uncle Vanya at the Barnes Theatre.

In 1926 she joined the Old Vic Company and performed in a number of leading Shakespearean roles. From 1928 to 1932 she performed many roles with the New Shakespeare Company at Stratford-upon-Avon and accompanied them in touring the US and Canada. Her 1932 performance as Doll Tearsheet in Henry IV Part II was singled out for praise.

Massingham wrote a number of plays, most famously The Lake, which is remembered for starring film actress Katharine Hepburn in an early stage appearance. The Lake was poorly received, prompting Dorothy Parker's infamous quip "Miss Hepburn runs the gamut of emotions from A to B."

Dorothy Massingham committed suicide on 30 March 1933 in Hampstead.

== Bibliography ==
- Glass Houses (1918)
- The Goat (1921)
- Washed Ashore (1922)
- Not in Our Stars (1924), a stage adaptation of the novel by Michael Maurice
- The Haven (1930)
- The Lake (1933) with Murray MacDonald
