= Socialist Labour Party (UK, 1903) =

- Abbreviation: SLP
- Founder: James Connolly; Neil Maclean
- Founded: 7 June 1903
- Dissolved: 1980
- Split from: SDF
- Newspaper: The Socialist
- Membership: 1,000 (1919)
- Ideology: Marxism–De Leonism; Industrial unionism
- Political position: Far-left

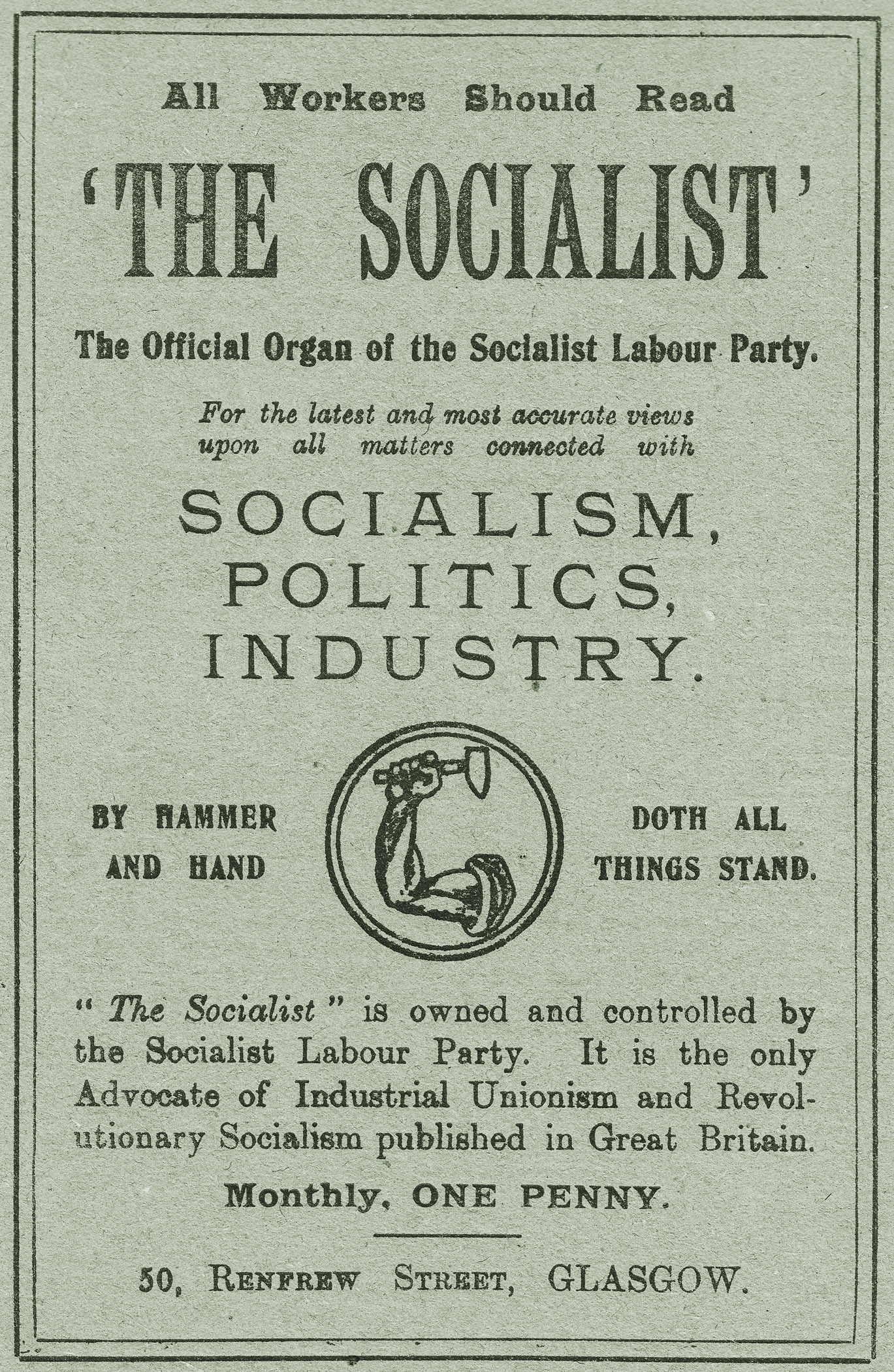
The British SLP adopted the familiar "arm and hammer" of its American namesake as its official logo.

The Socialist Labour Party was a socialist political party in the United Kingdom. It was established in 1903 as a splinter from the Social Democratic Federation (SDF) by James Connolly, Neil Maclean and SDF members impressed with the politics of the American socialist Daniel De Leon, a Marxist theoretician and leading figure of the Socialist Labor Party of America. After decades of existence, the group was finally disbanded in 1980.

== Organisational history ==
=== Formation ===
The British Socialist Labour Party began as a faction of the Social Democratic Federation (SDF) headed nationally by Henry Hyndman. A group of Scottish members of the organisation, led by an engineering worker named George Yates, strongly criticised the party leadership of the SDF for supporting the entry of conservative socialist Alexandre Millerand into the bourgeois French cabinet at the 1900 Congress of the Second International. The group attacked the party leadership as reformist and began to publish their critique abroad in The Weekly People, edited by Daniel DeLeon, official organ of the Socialist Labor Party of America.

The tendency, initially known as the "Glasgow Socialist Society," took over publication of James Connolly's newspaper, The Socialist, in Scotland in 1902. A purge followed in the SDF at its 1903 Annual Conference, with the dissident radicals denounced as "Impossibilists" by the SDF leadership.

On 7 June 1903 the Socialist Labour Party was formally established at a meeting in Edinburgh, with the already extant monthly newspaper The Socialist declared its official organ. The party began with a membership of only about 80 individuals in 4 branches, all in Scotland—two in Edinburgh, one in Glasgow, and one in Falkirk.

Although deeply influenced by the Socialist Labor Party of America, members of the fledgling British organisation sought their intellectual independence from the start. Whereas the American SLP strongly opposed advancing ameliorative "immediate demands," the new British organisation did not follow, instead initially choosing to adopt a programme of immediate demands matching those of the SDF from whence it sprung. Indeed, there was some discussion as to whether the new party should adopt an altogether different name so as to further delineate themselves from their American counterparts. Trade unionist Tom Bell, a delegate to the inaugural conference, later recalled:

"The question of the name of the new party required a little thought. We were anxious not to create the impression which the official SDF was trying to encourage, that we were only the tools of the American SLP. We thought of 'Republican Socialist Party,' etc., etc. It was Connolly who with characteristic directness proposed 'The Socialist Labour Party.' 'It doesn't matter what you call yourself,' he declared, 'you'll be dubbed the SLP anyway.' And the SLP we became."

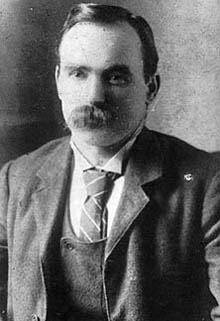
Radical Irish labour leader James Connolly was an important figure in the formation of the British SLP.

Radical Irish republican and trade union leader James Connolly attempted to play a vital role in the British SLP's formative days, energetically traveling back and forth across Scotland, addressing dozens of meetings on behalf of the organisation. His efforts were largely ineffectual, however, as no major influx of Scottish workers into the SLP's ranks was forthcoming. The party's development was further hampered by Connolly's departure to the United States in September 1903, exacerbated by the resignation of the editor of The Socialist, George Yates, that same month. Still, the tiny group managed to persevere, with a young engineer named Neil Maclean serving as National Secretary.

As was the case with the American party of the same name, from which it drew inspiration, the Socialist Labour Party considered itself a highly principled and uncompromising organisation. The group refused to work in tandem with "reformists" such as those populating the SDF or the Independent Labour Party. The SLP instead focused on producing and distributing its own propaganda, leaflets, pamphlets, and papers calling for establishment of a bloc of industrial unions as a necessary first step to socialist revolution. The group insisted that its members should avoid taking part in unemployment demonstrations as these were "sentimental" and built false hopes in the viability of the existing system. Echoing the perspective of the American SLP, the majority of the Scottish SLP argued for the use of political action for propaganda and publicity purposes.

The SLP was a highly disciplined and centralised organization. Following the lead of its American counterpart, it mandated that its central press should be directly owned by the party. The party sought to enforce the ideological purity of its printed propaganda through a strict requirement that no branch be able to distribute any literature not previously approved by the SLP's Executive Committee. The party saw the path to socialist revolution blocked by a conservative bureaucracy at the top of the established trade union movement, committed to a "pure and simple" policy of increasing wages and improving conditions in the shop rather than fighting for socialist organization of industry as a whole. Instead, the party sought to establish a network of explicitly socialist unions which would do battle with the so-called "labour fakirs" of the existing union movement. The organization never had sufficient numbers to carry its professed desires into action, however.

The Socialist Labour Party remained headquartered in Scotland, the location of an overwhelming percentage of its members, although it did establish some individual members and small section in Northern England, especially Yorkshire. The organization was thus well-placed to play a leading role in the Red Clydeside movement. They had a great deal of influence on the Clyde Workers Committee, but failed to win it to socialism. Other members, such as J.T. "Jack" Murphy, were influential in the Sheffield Workers Committee and gradually abandoned the DeLeonist strategy of creating dual unions, coming to adopt the strategy of working within existing unions and "boring from within" in an effort to win them to their ideas.

=== The question of international affiliation ===
The new party determined to send a delegation to the 1904 Amsterdam Congress of the Second International and selected a group of five to represent the organisation there. Upon arriving, the SLP Scots were told by the credentials committee of the congress to submit their credentials for participation to the British delegation, a group which included the rival Social Democratic Federation. The SLP delegation refused and were excluded from the congress for the remainder of the proceedings. This experience served to heighten the suspicion of the party towards the International and the party remained henceforth unaffiliated.

Following the Congress, the leading figure of the American SLP, party editor Daniel DeLeon, paid his Scottish followers a visit en route home to America. A historian later recalled that "DeLeon's visit was no more than a moderate success. His speeches savoured more of the university lecture room than the socialist platform. He had none of the flowering rhetoric at that time deemed essential."

By July 1905 the party had established a total of nine branches, including groups at Oxford, Southampton, Birmingham, and London. The Oxford branch was particularly influential, with the party making inroads with the trade unionists enrolled at Ruskin College and the party's literature playing a role in the local strike movement as well as the establishment of the Central Labour College and Plebs League.

The SLP published a wide array of literature from the Marxist canon and emerged as the single most important distributor of Marxist literature in Great Britain. It has been noted that "there can have been scarcely a single person involved in the foundation of the Communist Party of Great Britain who was not, at some time, influenced by the SLP and its literature."

=== The industrial unionism of the IWW ===
In 1905 in the United States there was established the Industrial Workers of the World (IWW), a revolutionary industrial union which sought to organize workers across all industries as a prelude for the socialist transformation of the economy. American Socialist Labor Party theoretician Daniel DeLeon was among the radical leaders who joined together to establish the new organisation—a group which included Eugene V. Debs of the Socialist Party of America and William "Big Bill" Haywood of the Western Federation of Miners. Parallel attempts to establish the IWW organisation were made in Canada, Australia, Great Britain, and elsewhere.

The leadership of the Glasgow-based Socialist Labour Party was quick to follow the lead of DeLeon and the American SLP, giving hearty endorsement of the new IWW organisation. This decision came at the cost of nearly tearing the British SLP asunder, however. Socialist Labour Party activist Tom Bell, then a 24-year-old in charge of the party's literature department remembered in his autobiography about the 1905 decision to endorse the IWW:

"[The decision] was so sharp and radical, and so opposed to our traditional attitude towards the leaders of the trade unions and Socialist Party, as to cause a certain confusion in our midst.... There was resentment at...committing the party to such a change of policy without discussion.... We had fierce discussions in Glasgow on the question of policy and finally, with a majority group in our branch, I resigned from the party. We remained outside for nearly a year."

Despite its espousal of revolutionary industrial unionism, the SLP still believed in use of the ballot box for educational purposes in the short term and as a transformative tool in the future, when the working class had come over to its ideas. It maintained its party organisation but established a propaganda group, the British Advocates of Industrial Unionism. Some party members took the ideas of the bitterly anti-political IWW to heart with fervour. In 1908 a syndicalist minority tendency, the Industrialist Union, headed by E. J. B. Allen, organised itself and exited the SLP, disclaiming all political work.

With eyes to America, the SLP started its own federation of industrial unions, akin to the Industrial Workers of the World. The British incarnation, established in February 1906, was known as the British Advocates of Industrial Unionism (BAIU). This group was essentially a propaganda society at its inception, attempting to disseminate the ideas of Daniel DeLeon about revolutionary industrial unionism. This group was reorganized in 1909 as the Industrial Workers of Great Britain, with a move made to actually recruit industrial unionists in opposition to the established trade union officialdom, regarded by the SLP as among the most bitter and incorrigible enemies of the radical working class. Goals and desires notwithstanding, the tiny SLP was singularly unsuccessful in its efforts to challenge the established unions of the TUC.

Purity had come at a price. The staunchly anti-reformist, anti-compromise, impossibilist SLP found itself largely isolated from the British working class, a small sect in a big working class ocean. The party's agitation for industrial unionism did have appeal to others in the radical political sphere, however. The idea of industrial unionism permeated the left wing of the Social Democratic Federation, becoming more or less a permanent ideological feature of that organization and its successor after 1911, the British Socialist Party. This common orientation, a rejection of traditional craft-based trade unionism and towards industrial unionism including unskilled workers, was to make the call for a new Communist Party an appeal which many SLP activists found impossible to resist.

=== The SLP and the emerging communist movement ===
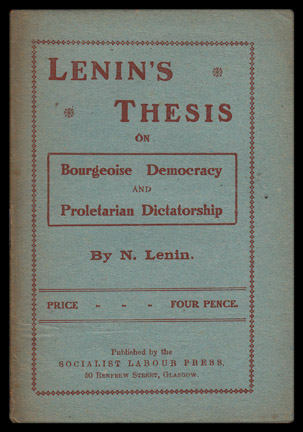
The SLP was inspired by the Bolshevik Revolution and lost a group of its members to the new Communist Party of Great Britain in 1920.

As a result of their work in the industrial field and their relentless focus on educational work, something they had in common with Scottish radical John MacLean of the BSP, the SLP had grown to the point at which it could claim over 1,000 members in 1919. Their official organ, The Socialist, boasted a circulation of 8,000 by the start of the next year.

The Socialist Labour Party was also extremely active in publicizing the struggle for national self-determination then taking place in Ireland. That one of the leaders of the Irish national liberation struggle, James Connolly, had also been a founder of the SLP being noted proudly by writers in the SLP press in this period.

From 1918, excited by the Bolshevik success in the Russian Revolution, the SLP opened talks with the British Socialist Party with the aim of forming a British Communist Party. The leadership could not agree with the BSP's plan to affiliate the new party to the Labour Party, however, and refused to join in the foundation of the Communist Party of Great Britain.

This decision by the party leadership incensed many rank and file members of the organization. A section of the organization, including key figures such as Shop Stewards Movement activist Jack Murphy formed an organised faction called the Communist Unity Group, which ultimately left the SLP to join the CPGB at its founding conference in the summer of 1920. Other leading members of the SLP such as Arthur MacManus and William Paul also joined. The loss of such key activists was a great blow to the SLP.

=== Decline and final disbanding ===
A small remnant of the SLP was reorganised by Leonard Cotton and survived for many years. Although the party seems to have been moribund by the 1960s it was revived by younger people and only finally dissolved in 1980.

One splinter group in Edinburgh, the British Section of the International Socialist Labour Party, turned towards Trotskyism and became the Revolutionary Socialist Party, fusing with the Revolutionary Socialist League in 1938.

== Conferences ==
Year	Name	Location	Dates	Delegates
1903	Inaugural Conference	Edinburgh	7 June	
1904				
1905				
1906				
1907				
1908				
Source: Raymond Challinor, The Origins of British Bolshevism, passim.

== General Secretaries ==
- 1903: Neil Maclean
- 1907: Frank Budgen
- 1910: Leonard Cotton
- 1918: Tom Bell
- 1919: Tom Mitchell
- 1929: Leonard Cotton
- 1956: T. A. Kelly

== Prominent members ==
- E.J.B. Allen
- Tom Bell
- John S. Clarke
- James Connolly
- David Kirkwood
- Arthur MacManus
- Neil Maclean
- Seán McLoughlin
- John William Muir
- J.T. "Jack" Murphy
- William "Bill" Paul
- George S. Yates
