= The Socialist (SLP newspaper) =

Front page of The Socialist for May 1904.

The Socialist was the newspaper of the Socialist Labour Party (SLP), a De Leonist organisation in Britain founded in 1903.

== Publication history ==
=== Establishment ===
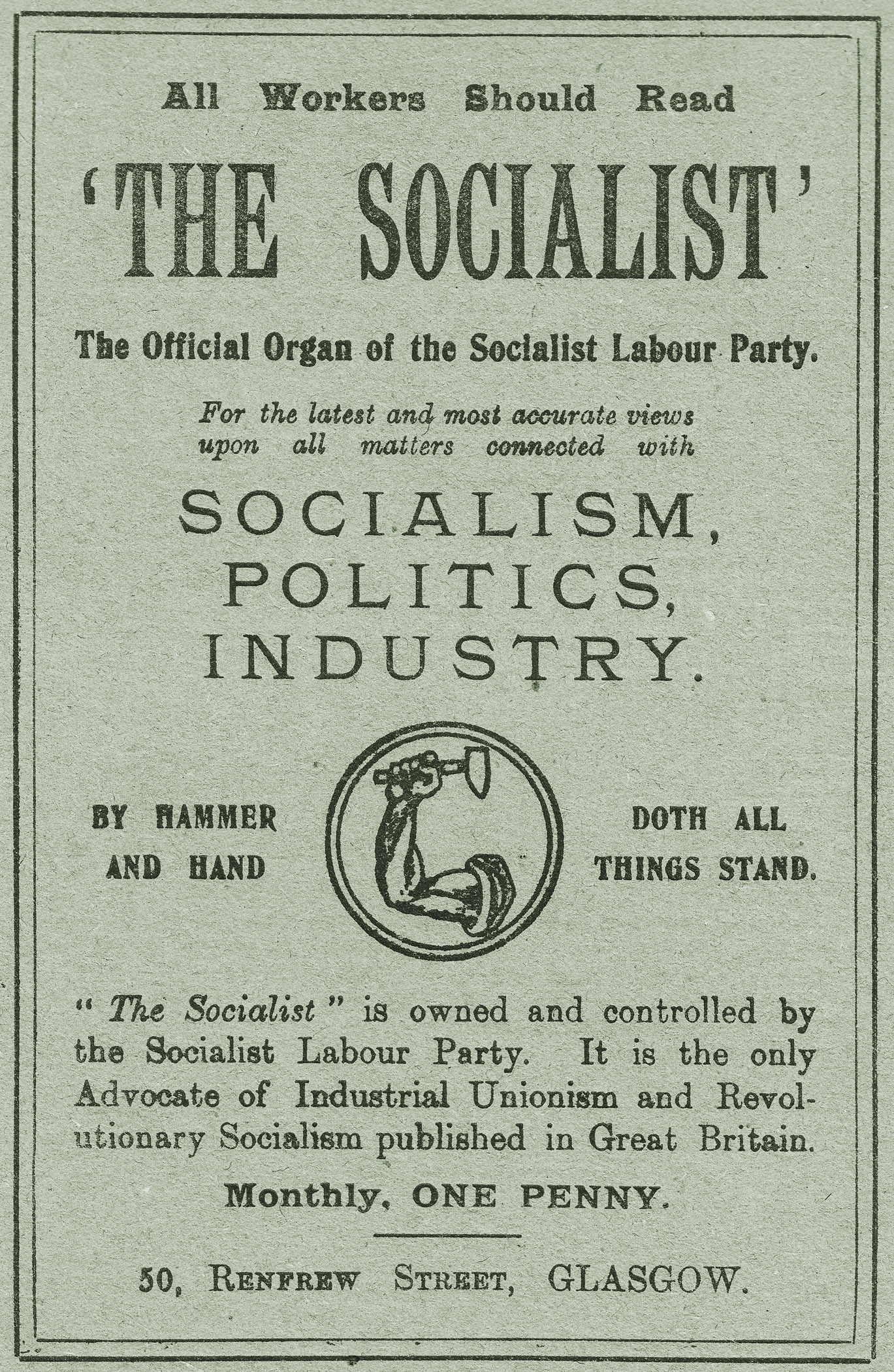
Advert for The Socialist from 1920. The ad notes that the publication was priced at 1 penny per copy.

The Socialist was set up by James Connolly in 1901. He was its first editor, after which George Yates took over. During Yates' editorship, it was the focus of the De Leonists within the Social Democratic Federation (SDF). After writing an article critical of the SDF Executive in 1903, Yates was expelled, and the supporters of The Socialist founded the SLP.

In 1904, Yates resigned, and the paper was edited until 1910 by Connolly close friend (a school teacher from Falkirk, and Gaelic speaker) John Carstairs Matheson. By the early 1910s, it was edited by John William Muir; John Smith Clarke was editor for a time, while this role was later taken on by Arthur MacManus, who from 1919 to 1920 was joint editor with Tom Bell. Publication was sporadic after 1922, but it continued on occasion as a duplicated journal.

=== Later years ===
The publication continued to be published as the organ of the Socialist Labour Party of Great Britain throughout the 1920s and 1930s, briefly lapsing from publication during the second half of the latter decade. Publication of the monthly was resumed in January 1939.

== Editors ==
- James Connolly (1901)
- George Yates (1903)
- John Carstairs Matheson (1904)
- John William Muir (c. 1910)
- John S. Clarke (1913)
- Arthur MacManus (1914)
- Arthur MacManus and Tom Bell (1919)
- James Clunie (1920)
